= State Level Committee for declaration of Manipuri Language as Classical Language of India =

Government body for Meitei language

State Level Committee for Declaration of Manipuri Language as Classical Language of India
- ꯁ꯭ꯇꯦꯠ ꯂꯦꯚꯦꯜ ꯀꯝꯃꯤꯇꯤ ꯐꯣꯔ ꯗꯤꯀ꯭ꯂꯦꯔꯦꯁꯟ ꯑꯣꯐ ꯃꯅꯤꯄꯨꯔꯤ ꯂꯦꯡꯒ꯭ꯋꯦꯖ ꯑꯦꯁ ꯀ꯭ꯂꯥꯁꯤꯀꯦꯜ ꯂꯦꯡꯒ꯭ꯋꯦꯖ ꯑꯣꯐ ꯏꯟꯗꯤꯌꯥ
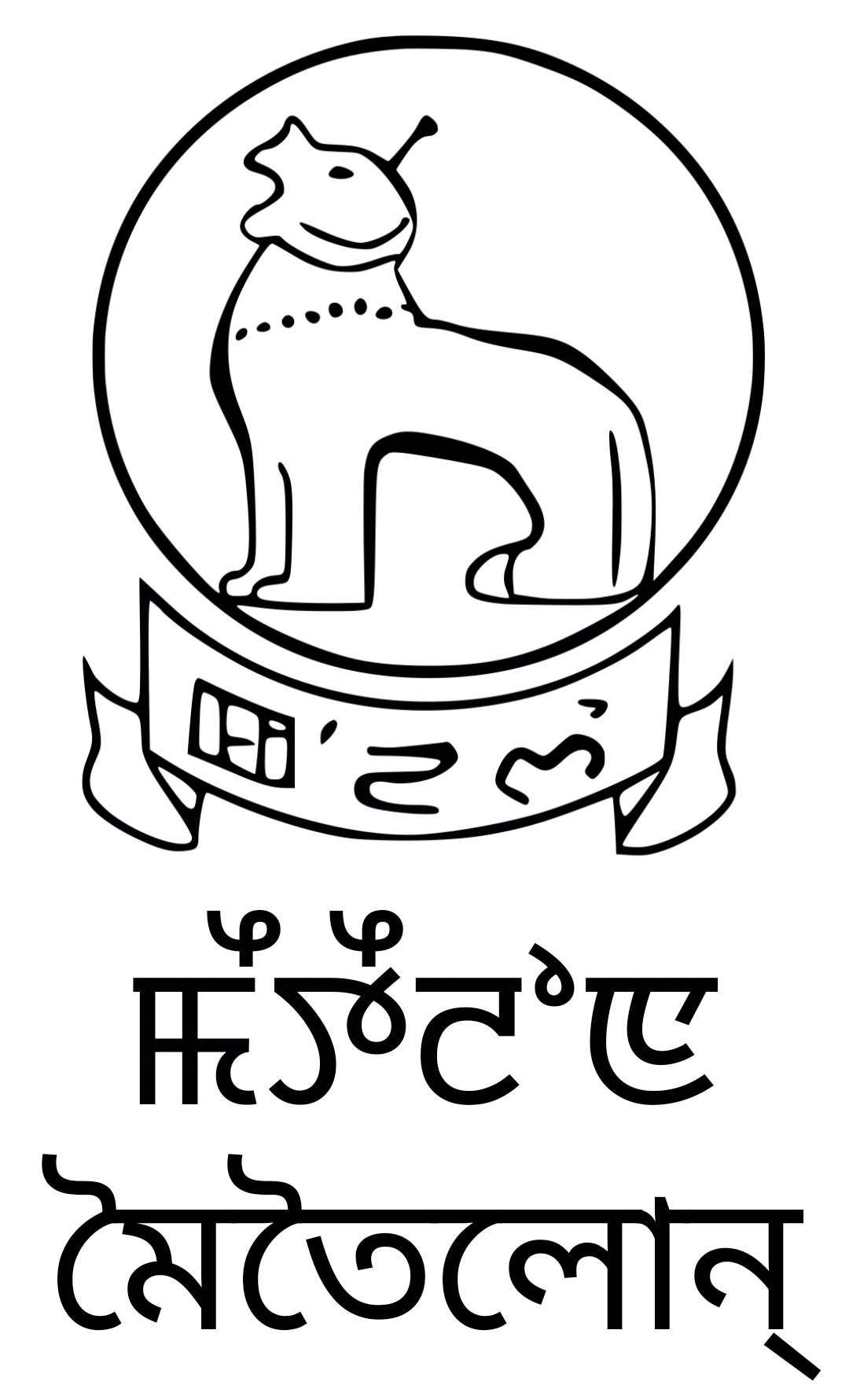
- State Level Committee for Declaration of Manipuri Language as Classical Language of India is constituted by the Government of Manipur
- Nickname: State Level Committee for Classical Language
- Named after: Manipuri language
- Formation: December 17, 2025; 10 months ago
- Established: 2025
- Founder: Government of Manipur
- Founded at: Imphal, Manipur
- Type: governmental
- Legal status: committee
- Purpose: preparing documents on Meitei language and literature which fulfill the criteria for official classical language status
- Headquarters: Imphal
- Location: Imphal
- Region served: Manipur state
- Fields: research
- Official language: Meitei language (officially known as Manipuri)
- Owner: Department of Art and Culture, Government of Manipur
- Chairman: Ajay Kumar Bhalla (Governor of Manipur)
- Convener: H. Gyan Prakash (Commissioner of Arts and Culture, Manipur)
- Key people: Chief Secretary of Manipur; Commissioner (Education-School), Manipur; Vice-Chancellor of Manipur University of Culture; Director of Arts and Culture, Manipur; Director of Language Planning and Implementation, Manipur; Representative from the Department of Linguistics, Manipur University; Representative from the Department of Manipuri, Manipur University; Representative of the Manipuri Sahitya Parishad
- Publication: Directorate of Information & Public Relations (Manipur)
- Parent organization: Department of Art and Culture, Government of Manipur
- Affiliations: Department of Art and Culture, Government of Manipur
- Funding: Government of Manipur

The State Level Committee for Declaration of Manipuri Language as Classical Language of India (Note: written in Meetei Mayek script (official script of the administration of the state) as ꯁ꯭ꯇꯦꯠ ꯂꯦꯚꯦꯜ ꯀꯝꯃꯤꯇꯤ ꯐꯣꯔ ꯗꯤꯀ꯭ꯂꯦꯔꯦꯁꯟ ꯑꯣꯐ ꯃꯅꯤꯄꯨꯔꯤ ꯂꯦꯡꯒ꯭ꯋꯦꯖ ꯑꯦꯁ ꯀ꯭ꯂꯥꯁꯤꯀꯦꯜ ꯂꯦꯡꯒ꯭ꯋꯦꯖ ꯑꯣꯐ ꯏꯟꯗꯤꯌꯥ.) is a committee of the Government of Manipur. It is responsible for pursuing the recognition of Manipuri (Meiteilon) as a Classical Language of India. On 17 December 2025, the Government of Manipur reconstituted the committee to strengthen the state's efforts to obtain this recognition.

== Background ==
The Government of India created the category of Classical Languages in 2004. Tamil was the first language to receive this status.

Since then, 11 languages have been recognized as Classical Languages. These are Sanskrit, Telugu, Kannada, Malayalam, Odia, Marathi, Pali, Prakrit, Assamese, and Bengali. The last five were granted the status in October 2024.

=== Efforts for recognition ===
The Government of Manipur has long sought the inclusion of Manipuri in the list of Classical Languages. It has cited the language's unique script and more than two thousand years of recorded history and literature in support of its request.

However, Manipuri was not included when five other languages received classical language status in October 2024.

Scholars and politicians, including Rajya Sabha Member of Parliament Leishemba Sanajaoba, and former Union Minister Dr. R. K. Ranjan, have stated that Manipuri meets all the required criteria for recognition.

=== Proposal to the Government of India ===
Two months before the October 2024 declaration, the then Minister of Education of Manipur, Th. Basanta Kumar, announced that a draft proposal was ready to be submitted to the Government of India.

Later, Union Minister of Culture and Tourism Gajendra Singh Shekhawat informed Parliament that no proposal had been received from the Government of Manipur for the consideration of Manipuri as a Classical Language.

== Committee members ==
Committee Composition
| Designation in Committee | Name | Primary Position / Affiliation |
|---|---|---|
| Chairman | Ajay Kumar Bhalla | Governor of Manipur |
| Convener | H. Gyan Prakash | Commissioner of Arts and Culture, Manipur |
| Member | Chief Secretary of Manipur | |
| Member | Commissioner (Education-School), Manipur | |
| Member | Prof. P. Gunindro | Vice-Chancellor of Manipur University of Culture |
| Member | Director of Arts and Culture, Manipur | |
| Member | Director of Language Planning and Implementation, Manipur | |
| Member | Representative from the Department of Linguistics, Manipur University | |
| Member | Representative from the Department of Manipuri, Manipur University | |
| Member | Representative of the Manipuri Sahitya Parishad | |
| Member | Prof. W. Nabakumar | Academician |
| Member | Prof. P. Nabachandra Singh | Academician |
| Member | Prof. Ch. Yaswanta Singh | Academician |
| Member | Maisnam Shivadutta Luwang | Cultural activist |

The Governor of Manipur, Ajay Kumar Bhalla, serves as the chairman of the committee. The Commissioner of Arts and Culture, H. Gyan Prakash, serves as the convener.

The committee also includes the Chief Secretary of Manipur, the Commissioner (Education-School), the Vice-Chancellor of Manipur University of Culture, the Director of Arts and Culture, the Director of Language Planning and Implementation, representatives from the Departments of Linguistics and Manipuri at Manipur University, a representative of the Manipuri Sahitya Parishad, academicians and cultural activists.

== See also ==
- Standard Manipuri
- Ancient Meitei language
- Medieval Meitei language
- Modern Meitei language
- Manipuri (Modern Indian Language)
- Manipuri Language Day
- Manipuri Poetry Day
- Manipuri Language Festival
- Meitei language movement
- Meitei linguistic purism movement
- Meitei classical language movement
- Meitei associate official language movement
- Meitei script movement
- Meetei Erol Eyek Loinasillol Apunba Lup
- Manipur Official Language Act, 1979
- Manipur State Literature Awards
- Manipur State Kala Akademi
- Manipuri Literary and Cultural Forum, Tripura
- Bangladesh Manipuri Sahitya Sangsad
