= Manipur Official Language Act, 1979 =

Act of making Meitei as an official language

Manipur Official Language Act, 1979 (Meitei: ꯃꯅꯤꯄꯨꯔ ꯑꯣꯐꯤꯁꯤꯌꯦꯜ ꯂꯦꯡꯒ꯭ꯋꯦꯖ ꯑꯦꯛ꯭ꯠ)
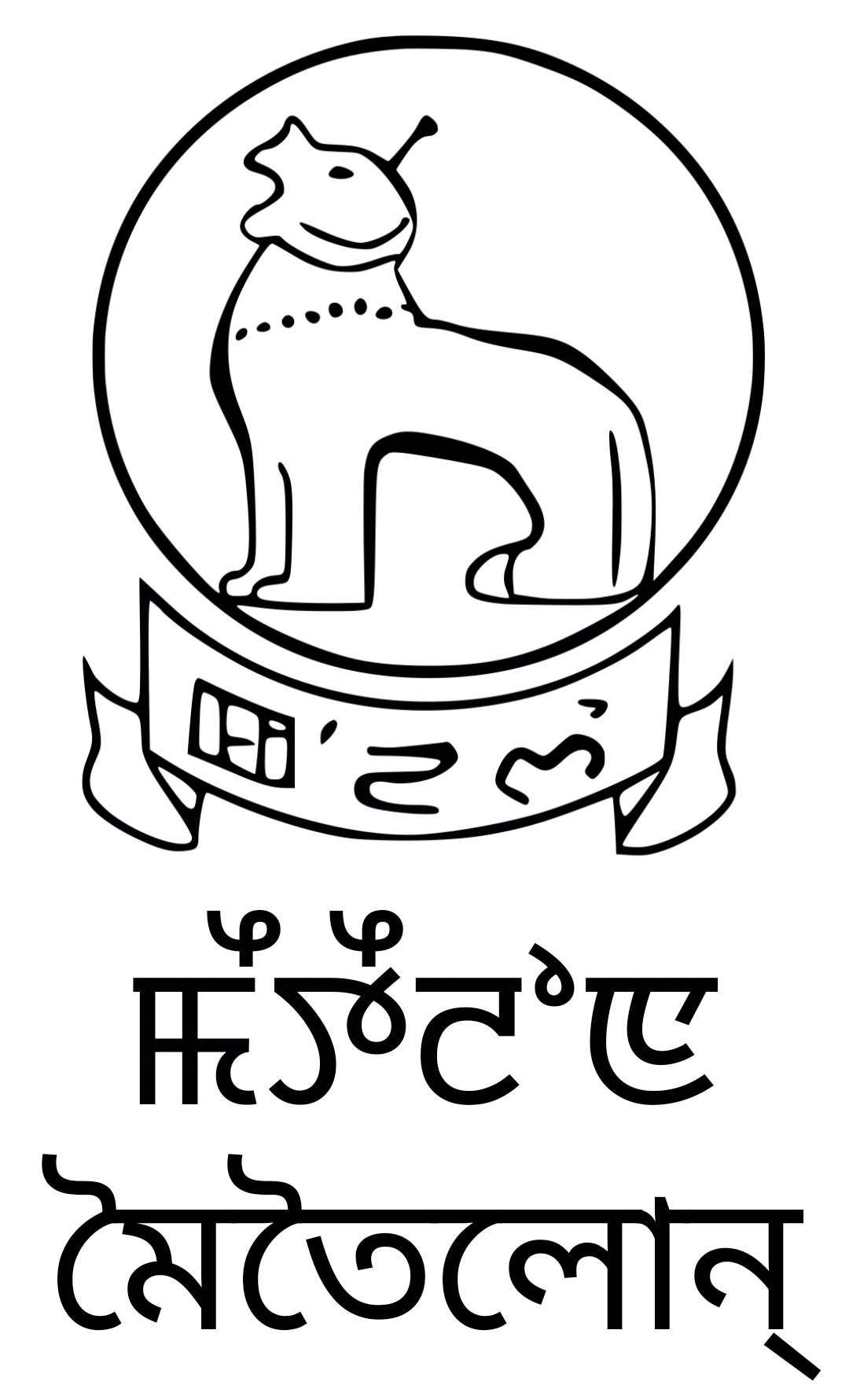
- Emblem of Manipur and the endonym of Meiteilon, an official language of the state, written in Meetei Mayek script and Bengali script, the official concurrent writing systems of the Government of Manipur

Manipur Legislative Assembly
- Long title: Manipur Official Language Act, 1979
- Territorial extent: Manipur
- Considered by: Government of Manipur
- Passed by: Manipur Legislative Assembly
- Passed: 27 October 1979
- Enacted: 27 October 1979
- Considered by: Manipur Legislative Assembly

Final stages
- Manipur Legislative Assembly amendments considered by the Manipur Legislative Assembly: 10 March 2021

Amended by
- Manipur Official Language (Amendment) Act, 2021

Summary
- an act to declare the official language of the State of Manipur
- Status: Current legislation

The Manipur Official Language Act, 1979 (Act 14 of 1979) (Meitei: ꯃꯅꯤꯄꯨꯔ ꯑꯣꯐꯤꯁꯤꯌꯦꯜ ꯂꯦꯡꯒ꯭ꯋꯦꯖ ꯑꯦꯛ꯭ꯠ) is an act (document) that declares the official language of the State of Manipur. It was passed by the Manipur Legislative Assembly, approved by the Governor of Manipur. It makes Meitei language (officially known as Manipuri language) as the official language of the Government of Manipur. It was initially enacted in 1979 but later amended in 2021, to replace Bengali script's sole usage by the concurrent usage of both Meitei script (officially known as Meetei Mayek) and Bengali script, for writing the Meitei language.

== Act enabled in 1979 ==
The Manipur Official Language Act, 1979 (Manipur Act 14 of 1979) was enabled by the Government of Manipur on 27 October 1979. It stated the following:

WHEREAS it is expedient to provide for the adoption of

Manipuri as the language to be used for the official purposes of the State of Manipur.

BE it enacted by the Legislature of Manipur in the Thirtieth Year of the Republic of India as follows:

1. (1) This Act may be called the Manipur Official Language 1979.

(2) It extends to the whole of Manipur.

(3) It shall come into force on such date as the State Government may, by notification appoint and different dates may be appointed for different official purposes of Manipur.

=== Official definition of "Manipuri" ===
The clause (f) of the section 2 of the Manipur Official Language Act, 1979 (Manipur Act 14 Of 1979) defines the meaning of Manipuri language as follows:

“Manipuri Language” means Meiteilon written in Bengali Script and spoken by the majority of Manipur population.

=== Official language of the state ===
The section 3 of The Manipur Official Language Act, 1979 (Manipur Act 14 Of 1979) explains the official language status of the state as follows:

3. (1) Subject to the provision of section 7, Manipuri language shall, on and from the commencement of this Act, be the language used in respect of all or any of the official purposes of the State.

(2) The form of numerals to be used for the official purposes of the State shall be the international form of Indian numerals.

(3) Notwithstanding anything in sub-section (1) for a period of fifteen years from the commencement of this Act the English Language shall continue to be used, for all the official purposes of the State Government, at the level of the Secretariat and such other Offices as may be specified from time to time in the official gazette, for which it was being used immediately before such commencement:

Provided that the Governor may, during the said period, by, order authorise the use of the Manipuri language in addition to the English language.

== Amendment in 2021 ==
The Manipur Official Language (Amendment) Act, 2021 (Manipur Act No. 7 of 2021) received permission from the Governor of Manipur on 25 February 2021. Afterwards, it was published in the Official Gazette of the Government of Manipur on 10 March 2021.

The act states the following:

BE it enacted by the Legislature of Manipur in the Seventy-second Year of the Republic of India as follows:-

1. (1) This Act may be called the Manipur Official Language (Amendment) Act, 2021.

(2) It shall come into force with effect from the date of its publication in the Official Gazette of Manipur.

2. In section 2 of the Manipur Official Language Act, 1979, for clause (f), the following shall be substituted, namely,-

"Manipuri Language" means Meeteilon written in Meetei Mayek and spoken by the majority of Manipur population:

Provided that the concurrent use of Bengali Script and Meetei Mayek shall be allowed in addition to English language, for a period upto 10(ten) years from the date of commencement of this Act.

== Causes of amendment ==
As a part of the Meitei script movement, a group named Meetei Erol Eyek Loinasillol Apunba Lup (MEELAL) pressurized the government of Manipur to make Meitei script an official writing system for the state's official language, Meitei language, in place of the Bengali script, demanding that the legal wording, "written in Bengali Script" in the Manipur Official Language Act, 1979, should be corrected and replaced with "written in Meetei Mayek script".

== Related pages ==
- Languages with legal status in India
- Directorate of Language Planning and Implementation
- Meitei language movement
  - Meitei linguistic purism movement
  - Meitei classical language movement
  - Meitei associate official language movement
- Meitei language festival
- Meitei language day
- Meitei poetry day
- Meitei script movement
  - Meetei Erol Eyek Loinasillol Apunba Lup
