= Meitei script movement =

Movement to revive Meitei script from extinction

Meitei script movement (Revivalism of Meitei script)
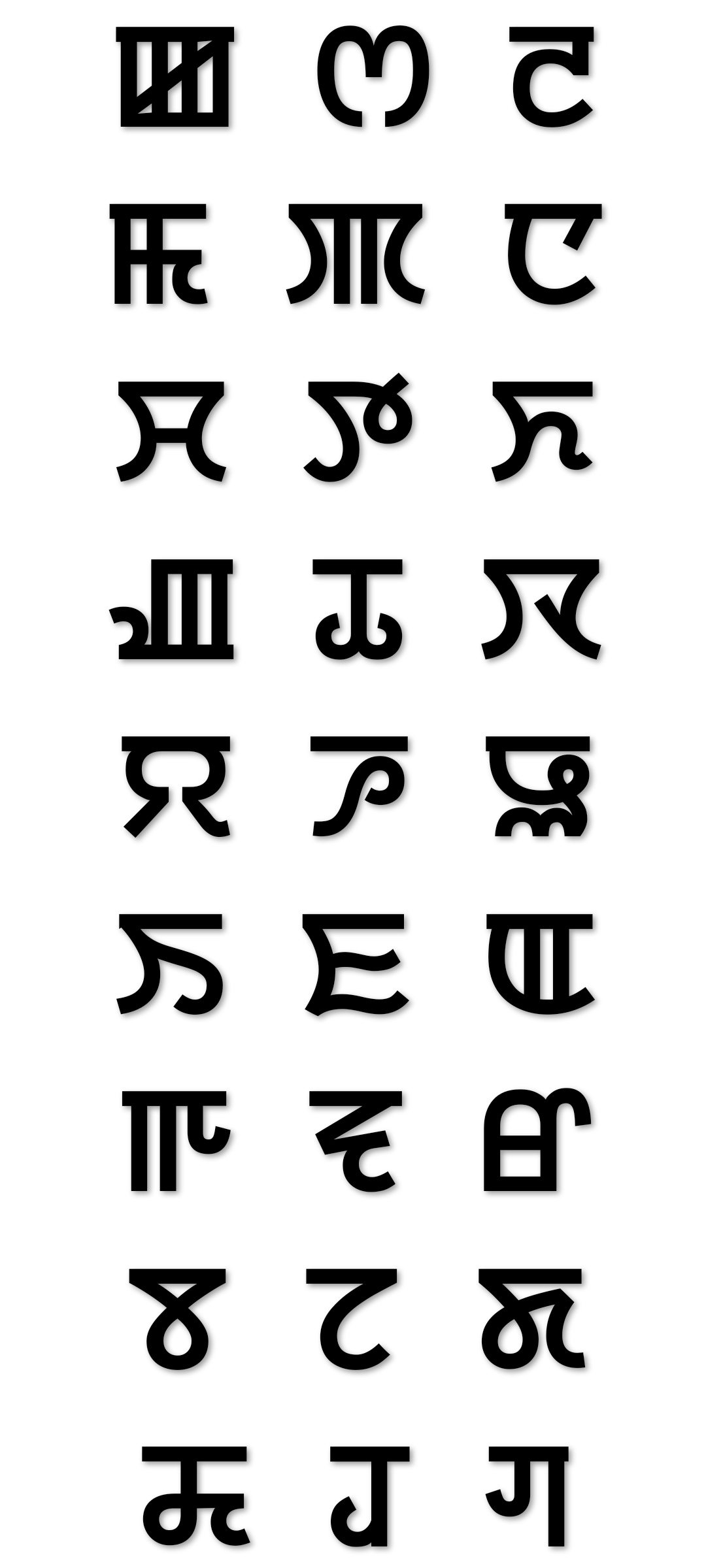
- The twenty seven prime letters of the modern Meitei writing system, consisting of 18 ancient letters and 9 evolved modern letters, approved by the Government of Manipur, for official usages
- English name: Meitei Script Movement; Meitei Script Revivalism
- Venue: Northeast India (Manipur, Assam and Tripura)
- Location: Northeast India (Manipur, Assam and Tripura)
- Also known as: Meetei script movement; Meitei Mayek movement; Meetei Mayek movement; Manipuri script movement; De-extinction of Meitei script; Resurrection of Meitei script; Revival of Meitei script
- Type: culture conflict; culture war; cultural renaissance; social movement
- Cause: Puya Meithaba (Book burning); Cultural assimilation; Cultural cringe; Cultural imperialism; Forced assimilation; Immigration and crime
- Motive: Fundamental rights in India; Right to equality; Right to freedom; Right against exploitation; Cultural and educational rights; Right to constitutional remedies; Indigenization; Right to exist; Universal Declaration of Human Rights (UDHR)
- Target: Revival and development of Meitei script
- Organised by: Apunba Meetei Mayek Sandokpa and Hinghanba Lup; Kangleipak Communist Party (KCP); Kangleipak Students' Association (KSA); Manipur Democratic Alliance (MDA); Meetei Erol Eyek Loinasillon Apunba Lup (MEELAL) (transl. United Forum for Safeguarding Manipuri Script and Language); Meitei Marup; Meitei National Front; and many others
- Participants: Chingsubam Akaba; Leishemba Sanajaoba; and many others
- Deaths: Chingsubam Akaba
- Accused: Gharib Nawaz (Meitei: Pamheiba)
- Charges: Puya Meithaba (Book burning); Cultural imperialism; Cultural cringe

Meitei script movement, also called Meetei script movement (sometimes also referred to as Manipuri script movement), is a series of cultural wars and campaigns, undertaken by various cultural and sociopolitical associations and organisations as well as notable individual personalities, against the Government of Manipur and other authorities concerned, regarding the revivalism and the development of the Meitei script.

== Background ==
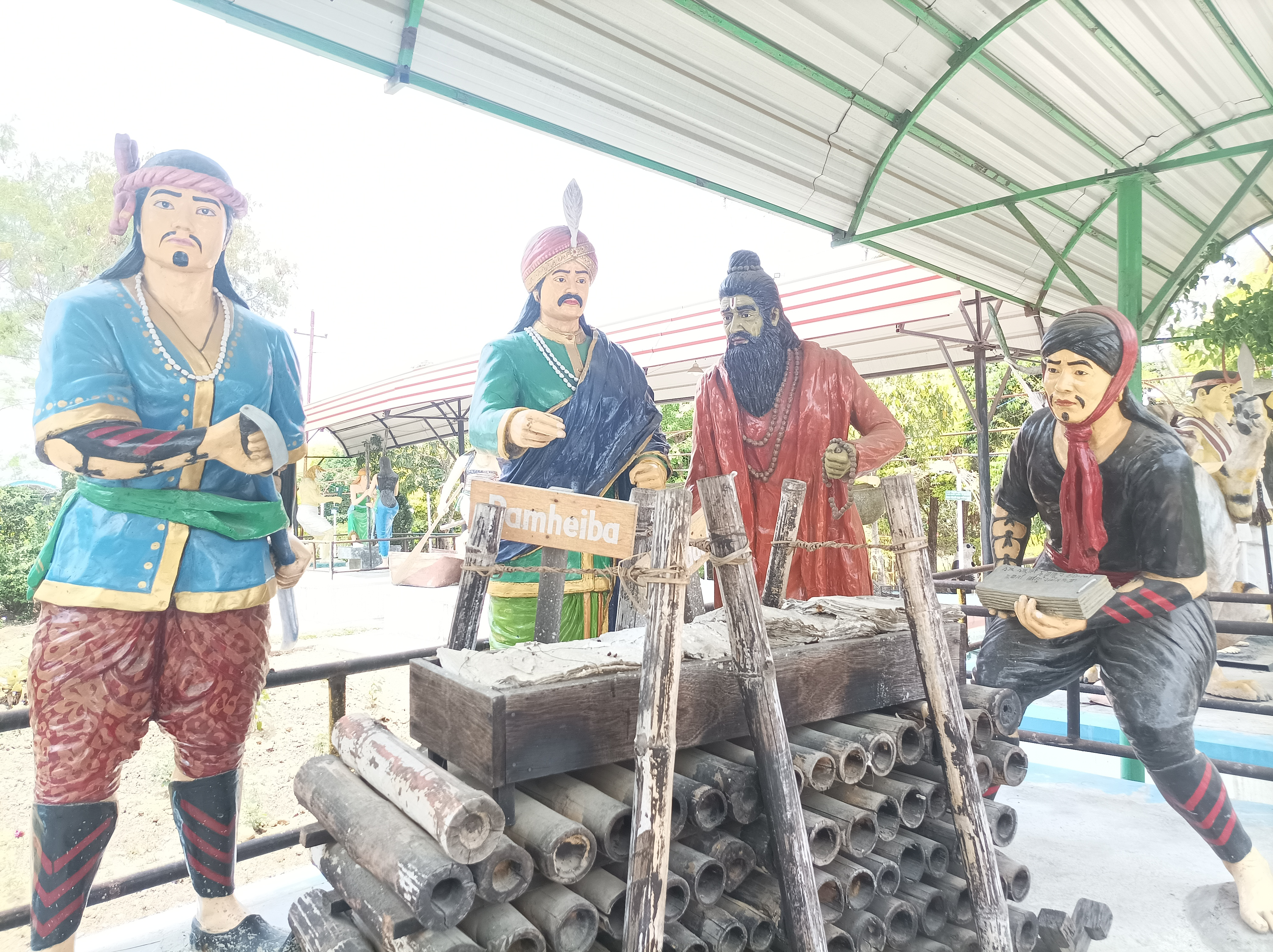
Depiction of Meitei King Pamheiba (AKA Garib Niwaj) & Hindu missionary Shantidas Gosai (during the libricide of Meitei scriptures) in the MMRC & Unity Park, Khangabok

In 1709, Hinduised Meitei King Garib Niwaz (Meitei: Pamheiba), after an inspiration from a Hindu missionary, Shantidas Gosai of Sylhet, Bengal, massively converted the religion of Meitei people from Sanamahism (aka Meiteism) into Hinduism in the then Kangleipak kingdom (renamed as "Manipur" kingdom, drawing mythical connection with Mahabharata's coastal Manipur kingdom). Simultaneously, the king banned the usage of Meitei script and decreed its replacement with Bengali script for the writings of Meitei language, which is extensively followed still today. The books written in Meitei script were burnt inside the Kangla Fort (Kangla Palace) in Imphal. Anyone who opposed him (the king) were either executed or exiled. This unfortunate incident of libricide is known as the Puya Meithaba (transl. burning of the puyas) in present times.

== Early stages of the movement ==
=== 20th century ===
Starting from the early 1930s, a socio-religious organisation named "Meitei Marup" (Meitei: ꯃꯩꯇꯩ ꯃꯔꯨꯞ) started the revivalism movement of the traditional Meitei culture, religion and script. Soon afterwards, many educated elite groups and youths joined the movement of revivalism and development of Meitei script.

In the year 1934, during the reign of Meitei King Churachand Singh (Meitei: ꯅꯤꯡꯊꯧ ꯆꯨꯔꯆꯥꯟ꯭ꯗ ꯁꯤꯡꯍ), the then Maharajah of Manipur kingdom, a group named "Beebodh Janani Shabha" published a book titled "Meetei Yelhou Lairik" (Meitei: ꯃꯤꯇꯩ ꯌꯦꯜꯍꯧ ꯂꯥꯏꯔꯤꯛ) and urged the then Royal Court to implement the Meitei script. Subsequently, in the year 1946, another group named "Meetei Mayek Thougal Marup" (Meitei: ꯃꯤꯇꯩ ꯃꯌꯦꯛ ꯊꯧꯒꯜ ꯃꯔꯨꯞ) published a book titled "Meetei Mayek Ahanba" (Meitei: ꯃꯤꯇꯩ ꯃꯌꯦꯛ ꯑꯍꯥꯟꯕ) and urged the then Manipur State Council to accept it. Afterwards, on 13 March 1958, many Meitei script scholars and enthusiasts organised a grand meeting, at the office of "Manipur Motor Association", thereby creating the "Meetei Mayek Luptin Committee" (Meitei: ꯃꯤꯇꯩ ꯃꯌꯦꯛ ꯂꯨꯞꯇꯤꯟ ꯀꯝꯃꯤꯇꯤ), which spearheaded the Meitei script movement massively in the later years.

In a period between March 1958 to February 1959, multiple symposia were organised and in a certain meeting, the Meetei Mayek sub-committee passed a resolution to accept the use of 27 letter system of the Meitei script, including 18 ancient alphabets that read the letters as "Kok, Sam, Lai, Mit, Pa, ..." and 9 derivative alphabets.

Many associations and organizations including but not limited to "Kangleipak Eyek Kanba Phamthon Lup" (Meitei: ꯀꯪꯂꯩꯄꯥꯛ ꯏꯌꯦꯛ ꯀꯟꯕ ꯐꯝꯊꯣꯟ ꯂꯨꯞ) (1958), "Mayek Luptin Committee" (Meitei: ꯃꯌꯦꯛ ꯂꯨꯞꯇꯤꯟ ꯀꯝꯃꯤꯇꯤ) (1958), "Lon Amasung Mayek Neinaba Apunba Marup" (Meitei: ꯂꯣꯟ ꯑꯃꯁꯨꯡ ꯃꯌꯦꯛ ꯅꯩꯅꯕ ꯑꯄꯨꯟꯕ ꯃꯔꯨꯞ) (1968), etc. were formed to assist the movement.

A decade after the birth of "Mayek Luptin Committee" (Meitei: ꯃꯌꯦꯛ ꯂꯨꯞꯇꯤꯟ ꯀꯝꯃꯤꯇꯤ), an organisation named "Lol Amasung Mayek Neinaba Apun Lup" (Meitei: ꯂꯣꯜ ꯑꯃꯁꯨꯡ ꯃꯌꯦꯛ ꯅꯩꯅꯕ ꯑꯄꯨꯟ ꯂꯨꯞ) organised a symposium about Meitei script during February 1969 and another symposium on 9 November 1969. The symposia accepted the 18 letter system of the Meitei script, found in the PuYas (Meitei: ꯄꯨꯌꯥ) as the genuine writing system and urged the Manipur Government to recognise it as the "Meetei national alphabet".

Afterwards, most of the experts had the consensus on the 27 letter system. The symposium organised by the Progressive Writers Association, from 11 to 12 September 1976 at GM Hall, followed by multiple academic meetings for more than two months, accepted the 27 letter system. The 27 letter system was also accepted by the meeting held on 13 November 1976, the state level meeting held at TG Higher Secondary School during May 1978, the meeting of the Meetei Mayek Expert Committee (Meitei: ꯃꯤꯇꯩ ꯃꯌꯦꯛ ꯑꯈꯪ ꯑꯍꯩ ꯂꯨꯞ) on 16 November 1978 and many others. Soon, the Government of Manipur published the Gazette (Extra ordinary) no. 13 recognising the 27 letter system.

On 16 November 1978, the "Kangleipak Eyek Kanba Phamthon Lup" (Meitei: ꯀꯪꯂꯩꯄꯥꯛ ꯏꯌꯦꯛ ꯀꯟꯕ ꯐꯝꯊꯣꯟ ꯂꯨꯞ) and the "All Manipur Students' Union" jointly formed the "Meitei Mayek Expert Committee" (MMEC). After researching the PuYas (old Meitei texts), the committee approved the 27 alphabet letters, consisting of 18 major letters and 9 derivative letters. The 27 letter system was also approved by the Government of Manipur and included in the Manipur Gazette on 22 April 1980. (Note: The approval of the 27 letter system of the Meitei script by the Government of Manipur & publishing it in the Manipur Gazette on 22 April 1980 does not mean that Meitei script is approved by the government for official usage. In the later years, several associations and organisations still continued their script movement to achieve the official recognition of Meitei script.)

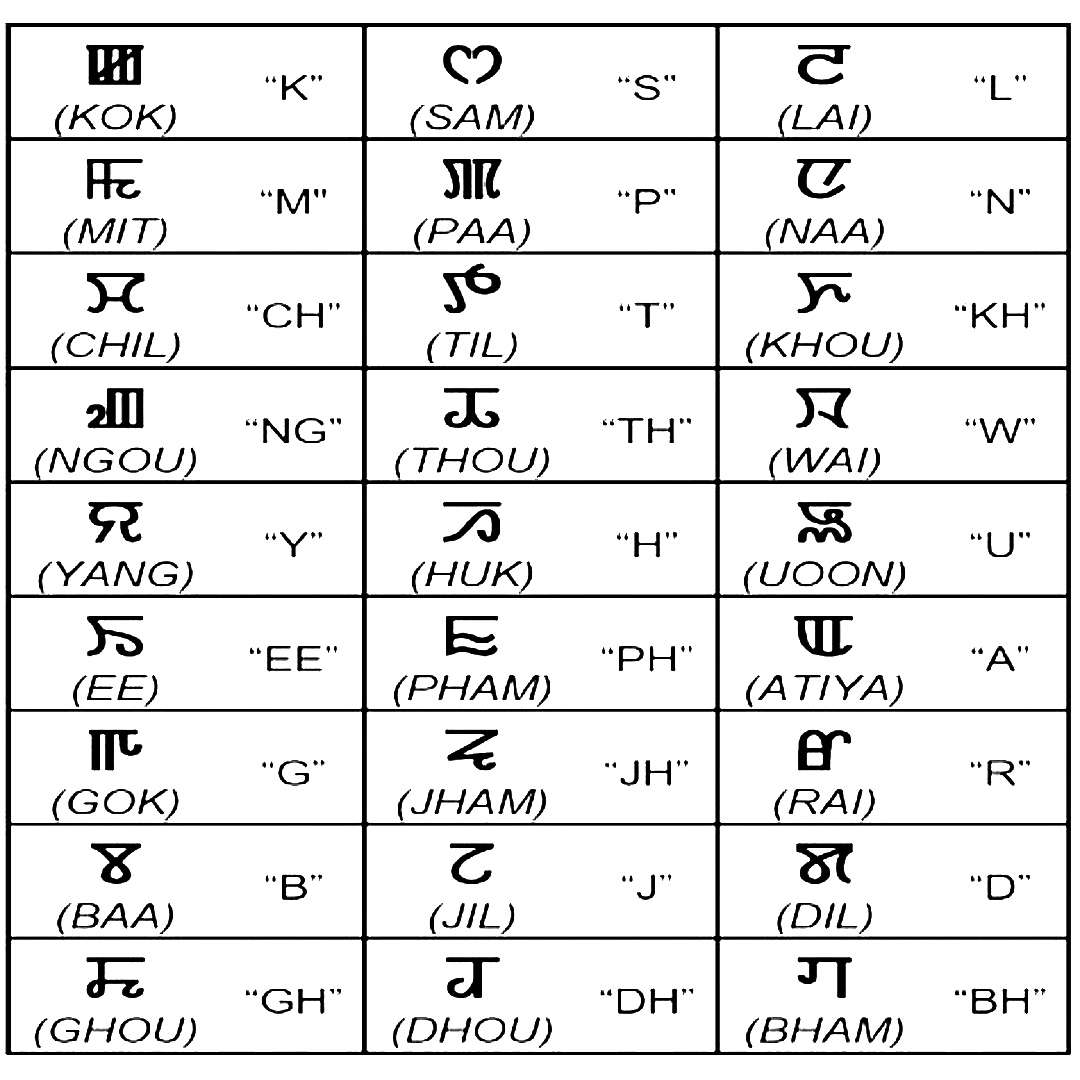
The officially recognized twenty seven letters of the Meitei script which are supported by the numerous script activist associations and organizations, including the Meetei Erol Eyek Loinasillol Apunba Lup (MEELAL)

=== 21st century ===
On 18 August 2003, a registered body of 24 social associations and organisations named "MEELAL" (Meitei: ꯃꯤꯇꯩ ꯏꯔꯣꯜ ꯏꯌꯦꯛ ꯂꯣꯏꯅꯁꯤꯜꯂꯣꯜ ꯑꯄꯨꯟꯕ ꯂꯨꯞ) started to spearhead the movement. Since then, it has been keeping a keen observation on the usages of non-Meitei language words in public. MEELAL organised campaigns for teaching of the Meitei script in educational institutions, to replace the usage of Bengali script in academic textbooks. Besides, it also organises free classes teaching how to write and read Meitei script for both young and old people in every possible way.

In the year 2005, a non political organization named "Meitei National Front", which observes the anniversary of Puya Meithaba (Meitei: ꯄꯨꯌꯥ ꯃꯩ ꯊꯥꯕ) every year, aimed to re-introduce the Meitei script once again and to replace the Bengali script. It was coordinated by another organization named "Apunba Meetei Mayek Sandokpa and Hinghanba Lup" (Meitei: ꯑꯄꯨꯟꯕ ꯃꯤꯇꯩ ꯃꯌꯦꯛ ꯁꯟꯗꯣꯛꯄ & ꯍꯤꯡꯍꯟꯕ ꯂꯨꯞ). This movement was led by Chingsubam Akaba (Meitei: ꯆꯤꯡꯁꯨꯕꯝ ꯑꯀꯥꯕ).

== Events of 2005 ==
When the Government of Manipur didn't take up any progressive actions for Meitei script, some script revival activists used extreme methods to draw attention to the government and to accelerate the process of the revivalism of the Meitei script. Public signboards lacking any writings of Meitei script were often smeared with tar. In another instance, a plaque at a city flyover was once broken by the script activists. A state government library in Imphal, housing a significant number of Meitei language books written in Bengali script, was incinerated in one night by some unknown protesters.

=== Burning of academic textbooks ===
MEELAL script activists visited different educational institutions, collected and burned Manipuri textbooks written in Bengali script for almost 2 months, during the Indian National Congress government led by Okram Ibobi Singh, that was merely waiting and watching the chaos and the turmoil.

=== Economic blockade and burning of vehicles ===
MEELAL made its script revival movement stronger in pace by enforcing an economic blockade in Manipur, besides the libricide. Many vehicles entering Imphal against the blockade were burned down in public, attracting the attention of Manipur Government.

=== Banning of newspapers and subsequent negotiations ===
MEELAL issued a decree that all the Meitei language newspaper dailies should use Meitei script. At first, the newspaper publishers refused to accept the decree. As a result, MEELAL raided newspaper distribution centres and threatened hawkers not to distribute any newspapers, till the publishers accept their decree. In response to MEELAL's actions, Meitei language newspaper dailies of Manipur stopped their publications for 3 consecutive days, protesting against the intrusion of their freedom of rights, until there was a negotiation under which they were allowed to distribute their newspapers if they reserved some space on the front page for news in Meitei script.

=== Burning of Manipur State Central Library ===
When the Government of Manipur didn't take up any progressive actions for Meitei script, on 13 April 2005, MEELAL (Meetei Erol Eyek Loinshillon Apunba Lup), burned down the Manipur State Central Library that stored more than 1,45,000 books, in the aim to immediately replace the Bengali script by the Meitei Mayek for writing Meitei language (officially called Manipuri language) in all the academic text books for students. Almost all the Meitei language books kept in the library were written (or printed) in Bengali script.

=== Governmental implementation of Meitei script under pressure ===
On 18 May 2005, under the pressure of MEELAL, Manipur Government issued an order for implementation of the 27 letter system of the Meitei script, thereby allowing the teachings of the script in the educational institutions from Class 1 and Class 2 from the year 2006.

== Script revival activists vs Manipur Police ==
In the year 2007, Meetei Erol Eyek Loinasillon Apunba Lup (MEELAL) (Meitei: ꯃꯤꯇꯩ ꯏꯔꯣꯜ ꯏꯌꯦꯛ ꯂꯣꯏꯅꯁꯤꯜꯂꯣꯟ ꯑꯄꯨꯟꯕ ꯂꯨꯞ) warned all vehicle owners in Manipur to change their vehicle number plates from English (Hindu-Arabic numerals) or Bengali numerals to Meitei numerals. MEELAL said "The indigenous script is an important part of the identity of the people." The Manipur Police arrested several MEELAL script revival activists as well as many artists and number plate dealers. They also cautioned the vehicle owners. As a reason for the arrests, Y Joykumar, Manipur Police Chief, said:

“Vehicles that sport Meetei Mayek on their number plates will be violating the Motor Vehicles Act and as such, will be liable for prosecution. The majority of people here are yet to read and write Meetei Mayek, and if any such vehicle is involved in an accident or a criminal case, no witness will be able to give the registration number.”

Manipur State Motor Vehicle Authority preferred Bengali script over Meitei script, regarding usages in vehicle number plates. Despite the obstacles, MEELAL didn't give up by saying that they are not against the law of the land as Meitei script is already included in the Government Gazette besides being used in educational institutions of Manipur.

== Revival as the effects of the movement ==
Getting the fruits of the movement, the usage of Meitei script is being improved.

- Due to the efforts of the revivalist activists, newspapers in Meitei language are mandated to publish at least one news item in Meitei script on the front pages.
- Billboards and other public displays are mandated to use the script.
- The registration numbers of the vehicles are also mandated to use the script.
- Since the year 2006, students have been taught in the Meitei script in educational institutions of Manipur, thereby the subsequent generations are freed from the previous patterns of enforcing the usage of the Bengali script. As a result, Meitei language newspapers, printing in Bengali script, started losing young readers, who were educated in Meitei script. Publishers, with a long-term vision for commerce, started publishing Meitei language publications in the Meitei script.
- Many associations and organizations started transliterations of writings (or printings), especially books, from Bengali script to Meitei script.
- Yumnam Khemchand Singh, the Speaker of Manipur Legislative Assembly, declared an announcement that a copy of the proceedings of the State Assembly would be recorded in the Meitei script.

Currently, the Meitei script is taught up to Master's degree in the Manipur University and other equivalent educational institutions. However, during the movement to achieve this current status, around five hundred MEELAL script activists were arrested and 20 were detained under the National Security Act (NSA).

== Achieving official script status ==
The Manipur Official Language (Amendment) Act, 2021 (Manipur Act No. 7 of 2021) was declared, in which Meitei script was given the official script status by the Government of Manipur. The act states the following:

"Manipuri Language" means Meeteilon written in Meetei Mayek and spoken by the majority of Manipur population: Provided that the concurrent use of Bengali Script and Meetei Mayek shall be allowed in addition to English language. for a period upto 10(ten) years from the date of commencement of this Act.".

== 2022 resolutions ==
During July 2022, MEELAL held a convention and adopted 3 resolutions, which are: (1) to ban all the obstructions to the use of 27 letter system of the Meitei script, (2) to consider any association or organisation violating the resolutions as public enemy and (3) to induce the government to consult experts and take up necessary steps to promote the 27 letter system of the Meitei script.

== Participating associations and organizations ==
- All Manipur Students' Union
- Meetei Mayek Expert Committee
- Lol Amasung Mayek Neinaba Apun Lup
- Lon Amasung Mayek Neinaba Apunba Marup
- Kangleipak Eyek Kanba Phamthon Lup
- Meetei Mayek Luptin Committee
- Meetei Mayek Thougal Marup
- Apunba Meetei Mayek Sandokpa and Hinghanba Lup
- Kangleipak Communist Party (KCP)
- Kangleipak Students' Association (KSA)
- Manipur Democratic Alliance (MDA)
- Meetei Erol Eyek Loinasillon Apunba Lup (MEELAL) (transl. United Forum for Safeguarding Manipuri Script and Language)
- Meitei Marup
- Meitei National Front

== See also ==
- Meitei language movement
  - Meitei linguistic purism movement
  - Meitei classical language movement
  - Meitei associate official language movement
- Meitei language festival
- Meitei language day
- Meitei poetry day

== Bibliography ==
- "The_evolution_and_recent_development_of_the_Meitei_Mayek_script".
- "Writing_off_domination_the_Chakma_and_Meitei_script_movements".
- Brandt, Carmen (2 January 2018). "Writing off domination: the Chakma and Meitei script movements". South Asian History and Culture. 9 (1): 116–140. doi:10.1080/19472498.2017.1411050. ISSN 1947-2498.
- "Introducing the Manipuri Script". e-pao.net.
- "MEELAL hails". www.thesangaiexpress.com.
