= Manipur State Literature Awards =

Literary awards for Meitei literature

The Government of Manipur is the patron of the Manipur State Literature Awards.

The Manipur State Literature Awards (Note: written in Meetei Mayek script (official script of the state's administration) as "ꯃꯅꯤꯄꯨꯔ ꯁ꯭ꯇꯦꯠ ꯂꯤꯇꯔꯦꯆꯔ ꯑꯦꯋꯥꯔ꯭ꯗꯁ".) are presented annually by the Government of Manipur to honor writers making distinguished contributions to the Meitei language (officially known as Manipuri language) and literature. These honors are organized by the Directorate of Language Planning and Implementation. It is the highest official state recognition in Manipuri literature. There are three categories: Lifetime Achievement, State Award for Literature, and Young Writer's Award.

== Manipur State Lifetime Achievement Award in Literature ==
Manipur State Lifetime Achievement Award in Literature Winners
Year	Writer	Literary Work
2024	Kangjam Ibohal Singh (I.S. Kangjam)	N/A (Awarded for overall contribution)

== Manipur State Young Writer's Award for Literature ==
Manipur State Young Writer's Award for Literature Winners
Year	Writer	Literary Work
2024	Akoijam Jiten	Khoyum Nongdam Kao (Epic Poetry)

== Manipur State Award for Literature ==
Manipur State Award for Literature Winners (Chronological List)
Award Year	Writer	Winning Literary Work	Genre / Notes
2008	BM Maisnamba	Ningthemnubi	Novel (First-ever recipient, awarded in July 2009)
2009	Thangjam Ibopishak	Shrimati Tomchababu	Poetry
2010	Moirangthem Borkanya	Yeningtha Nangna Khongdoi Hullakpasida	Poetry
2011	Shree Biren	Chatloiko Ei Mafam Kadaidasu	Poetry
2012	Kshetri Bira	Nangbu Ngaibada	Novel
2013	Birendrajit Naorem	Turel Nangdi	Poetry (Prize money raised to ₹3 Lakh this year)
2014	Keisham Priyokumar	Nongkhong Tamna	Short Stories
2017	Aribam Chitreshwar Sharma	Apaiba Leichil (Floating Clouds)	Novel
2018	Rajkumar Bhubonsana	Kellaba Unasing	Poetry (Awarded at the July 2019 ceremony)
2019	Sudhir Naoroibam	Asengba Yum	Short Stories (Awarded in February 2020)
2020	Beryl Thanga (Laishram Biramangol Singh)	Ei Amadi Adungeigi Ithat	Novel (Awarded in November 2021)
2021	Irungbam Deven Singh	Malangbana Kari Hairi	Poetry
2022	Maibam Nabakishore Singh	Thamoigi Mari	Short Stories (Awarded in 2023)
2023	Nahakpam Aruna	Ahingba Upanyas	Literary Criticism / Essays
2024	Arambam Ongbi Memchoubi	Thamamba Ahing	Poetry (Conferred at the May 2026 ceremony)

== See also ==
- State Level Committee for declaration of Manipuri Language as Classical Language of India
- Modern Meitei language
- Standard Meitei
- Meitei alphabet
- Meitei language day awards
- List of Yuva Puraskar winners for Meitei
- List of Sahitya Akademi Translation Prize winners for Meitei
- List of Sahitya Akademi Award winners for Meitei
- List of Bal Sahitya Puraskar winners for Meitei
- Manipuri Sahitya Parishad
- Bangladesh Manipuri Sahitya Sangsad
- Manipuri Literary and Cultural Forum, Tripura
