= Haobam Nalini =

- Born: Haobam Nalini Devi; March 1, 1957 (age 69); Kangabam Leikai, Imphal, Manipur, India
- Education: MA, PhD (Manipuri), BEd
- Occupations: Writer, academic
- Writing career
- Genres: Short stories, poetry, drama, essays
- Notable work: Kanglamdriba Eephut
- Notable awards: Sahitya Akademi Award (2025)

Haobam Nalini (also known as Haobam Nalini Devi) is an Indian writer and academic from Manipur, known for her contributions to Manipuri literature. In 2026, she was conferred the Sahitya Akademi Award for the year 2025 for her short story collection, Kanglamdriba Eephut.

== Early life and education ==
Nalini was born on March 1, 1957, in Kangabam Leikai, Imphal. She is the daughter of Haobam Ibungotombi Singh and Haobam Ongbi Sakhitombi Devi. She pursued her higher education in Manipuri literature, earning a Master of Arts (MA) and a Doctor of Philosophy (PhD) from Manipur University. She also holds a Bachelor of Education (BEd) and the Kaba Shastri title.

== Personal life ==
Haobam Nalini is married to Khaidem Jaichandra. The couple has one son and one daughter. She resides with her family at Thongju Part II, Imphal, near the IPS School.

== Career ==
Nalini had a long career in academia, serving as a teacher at several institutions including Kha Manipur College in Kakching and Thoubal College. She was an associate professor at the D.M. College of Teacher Education in Imphal, from which she retired. She is an active life member of several prominent literary organizations, including:

- Manipuri Sahitya Parishad
- Leikol (a women's literary body)
- Manipuri Sanskrit Parishad
- Naharol Sahitya Samiti

== Literary career ==
Nalini has published ten books across various genres, including poetry, short stories, and drama. Her writings are noted for their cultural depth, exploration of human emotions, and nuanced portrayal of contemporary Manipuri society. Her most acclaimed work, Kanglamdriba Eephut is a collection of short stories published in 2019. In 2025, she published a poetry collection titled Nungsi Thoiba, which was released in English, and Meitei language, in Bengali script, and Meitei script.

== Awards and recognition ==
- Sahitya Akademi Award (2025): Awarded for her book Kanglamdriba Eephut.
- Yendrembam Surlata Puraskar (2020): Awarded by Sahitya Seva Samiti, Kakching, for Kanglamdriba Eephut
- Dr. Jamini Devi Award (2022): Presented by the Manipuri Sahitya Parishad.
