= Puya Meithaba =

Legend about the burning of ancient writings in Manipur

Puya Meithaba (Burning of the puya), or Lairik Meithaba, (Note: A 1996 publication on the history of Manipuri literature by the Sahitya Akademi mentions the "historical bonfire" as Lairik Meithaba, where old Meitei manuscripts were set to fire at the behest of Shantidas Goswami!) refers to the annual commemoration of a legendary 18th-century scripture burning in Manipur by a neo-convert Vaishnavite King, or to the original libricide itself. There is no historical evidence that the libricide happened. Nonetheless, the commemoration, organised by the Meitei National Front and others since 1979, has been a critical tool in the spread of Meitei nationalism and has mainstreamed a particular reconstruction of premodern Manipur, which has come to be uncritically reproduced even in academic publications.

== Background ==
The Meiteis—including the royal house— traditionally followed an indigenous faith of worship that revered nature, ancestors, and fertility gods and goddesses, called lais. Situated far outside Aryavarta, the region was immune from Vedic and Hindu influences; until at least the sixteenth century, the royal culture did not bear any signs of Hindu influence. (Note: In the absence of any primary source other than the royal chronicle, it is difficult to sketch a cultural history of premodern Manipur.) In 1704, Charairongba, the incumbent King became the first royal figure to be initiated into Vaishnavism; coins inscribing "Sri Krishna" were minted and Hindu temples were constructed but there is no evidence that the public sphere was affected to any significant degree. Five years later, his son Pamheiba ascended to the throne; he followed Meitei funerary rituals upon Charairongba's death and initially showed no inclination towards Vaishnavism, providing selective patronage to the shrines for lais. However, in 1715, he adopted the Sakta tradition under one Bengali Brahmin and two years later, followed his father into being initiated as a Gaudiya Vaishnava. Nevertheless, while Hindu temples were increasingly commissioned, the patronage of Meitei sites continued as before.

C. 1720, Santa Das Goswami, a missionary from Sylhet arrived in his court, preaching Ramanandi Vaishnavism and upholding it as the most appropriate sect for warrior-kings. Facing an increasingly recalcitrant Cachar and Tripura—and Burma, their traditional enemy—the martial ethos of the sect suited Pamheiba’s expansionist ambitions. He converted in 1728 and, in the words of Rodney Sebastian, "re-grammared the very concepts of kingship and the sovereign from within the religio-political authority of Ramanandi Vaishnavism," adopting the title of Maharaja and identifying his realm as the "Manipur" of Indian epic literature. Pamheiba, unlike his predecessor, tried to unify the masses under a single religio-cultural authority, extensively Hindu-ising the cultural milieu in the process—mass-conversion rites were frequently held, translation of Puranas and Ramayana were commissioned, (Note: A copy of Bhagavata Purana was supposedly stolen off from a convoy of the Tripura Raj who were bringing it from Assam! See Dutta, Deepashree (5 June 2025). "From Bandit Raja to Exemplary Devotee: Vaishnav Accounts of the Kingdom of Bishnupur". Religions of South Asia. 19 (1): 58–81. doi:10.1558/rosa.26038. for a similar case in contemporary Bengal.) Hindu cultural norms like prohibition on beef were legalized, Meitei festivals were hybridized with Hindu ones while lai shrines were destroyed, images of Meitei deities dismantled and recast into coins, and worship of some lais consigned only to the (Hindu) Brahmins.

== Contemporary Narrative ==
In contemporary Meitei culture, which bears a deep ambivalence towards mainland India (and Hindu ethos), Pamheiba's reign serves as a moment of rupture in their transcendental history. He is alleged to have violently suppressed Sanamahism, the local religion as referred to today, and imposed Vaishnavism on his subjects via oppressive means. (Note: For an assessment of Garib Nawaz's religious policy, see Parratt, Saroj Nalini (1989). "Garib Niwaz Wars and Religious Policy in 18th Century Manipur". Intemationales Asienforum. 20 (3–4): 298–302.) In furtherance, many local scholars hold that Puyas—the ancient traditional texts of Meiteis—were destroyed at his orders with an explicit aim of purging the traditional episteme; this narrative of libricide has gained immense popularity among Meiteis, notwithstanding the presence of hundreds of extant Puyas.

The precise date of the event is disputed. The details vary with authors and are often legendary in nature since they need to account for the sheer number of extant Puyas—some mention that the Puyas were scheduled to be incinerated but flew away from the fire; another version mentions that they were burnt but copies were already made of them in secret; yet another mentions that they were transported out of the valley using secret messengers. A few scholars have even produced lists of the burnt Puyas. It has also been propounded that the usage of Bengali script in place of Meitei Mayek began after this purge.

== Historicity ==
No contemporaneous source exists for the libricide. Some scholars claim the event to have been chronicled in the Cheitharol Kumbaba but such claims do not withstand scrutiny. Neither the manuscript in Meitei, preserved by the royal palace, nor the Bengali transliteration by Thongam Madhab, a royal scribe (c. 1925) mentions any such event. (Note: A superficially edited version of Madhab's transliteration was published by Lairenmayum Ibungohal Singh and Ningthoukhongjam Khelachandra in 1967 from under the banner of Manipuri Sahitya Parishad, which did not mention the events either.) Some late apocryphal manuscripts do assert that Meitei texts were destroyed by the incumbent king Garib Nawaz on the 17th of Mera (?) in Sakabda 1654 (1732 CE) but these were likely forged to support the then-dominant collective memory of a libricide; all of them emend a word from Leima to Lairik. (Note: The actual line is Meetei Leima manghanye (lit. The Meitei Queen was destroyed; mean. The Queen was declared to be ritually unclean and/or excommunicated). Leima means queen whereas Lairik means books.) (Note: The first manuscript to carry this emendation was copied by one Kharaibam Deva in Bengali script, which Parratt found to be incomplete and in places, badly copied. In 1987, a second "critical" edition of Madhab's manuscript (see endnote e) was published by Khelachandra by extrapolating details from three other extant manuscripts — the one by Deva, and another two kept by Nameirakpam Dinachandra and Moirangthem Chandra — and even other Puyas; this mentioned the libricide and even provided a short account of the event but Paratt notes the descriptions to be unreferenced and mostly from sources, which had little historical worth, having never been subject to textual-historical criticism. For what it is worth, Dinachandra's manuscript did not mention the event and Manipur Sahitya Parishad's latest edition of the Kumbaba has since silently reverted to the 1967 version.)

Gangmumei Kamei notes the libricide to have been referenced for the first time in the works of Khumanthem Kaomacha, a Brahmin balladist-turned-historian in his 1934 publication, Manipur Itibritti. (Note: Kaomacha even listed the names of the 123 puyas, which were burnt. See Kaomacha, Khumanthem (1980) [1934]. Manipur Itibrita. Vol. 1 (1 ed.). pp. 68–70.) Pandita-Raja Atombapu Sharma reiterated these claims in his 1952 work Pakhangba and the claim soon made into every local publication. Carmen Brandt, Jyotirmoy Ray, and others have doubted the historicity of the libricide and criticized scholars who had uncritically accepted the popular narratives; they note that local sources give low and contradictory values about the number of burnt scripts, highlight the numerous documents that were written in Meitei during and well after the reign of Pamheiba including the very Cheitharol Kumbaba, and interpret Nawaz's attitude towards religion as one of strategic ambivalence than as one of missionary zeal.

== Commemoration ==
The narrative about the intentional arsoning of the Puyas alongside a forced change of script occupies a prominent place in the collective memory of the Meiteis. It has become increasingly popular in Manipur since 1979 (Note: Other Meitei organisations have argued that this was not the first commemoration of the event.) when the nationalist-revivalists—under the banner of Meitei National Front—decided to commemorate the libricide in a heavily publicized event on 23 January, every year, and evoke nostalgia for the Meitei script which had gone into increasing disuse. (Note: Metei National Front asserts the original event to have occurred on the 23rd of Wakching, a Thursday, in Sakabda 1651 (1729 CE). This date is disputed by other factions, who choose to commemorate the event on a different day. Even assuming the date to be true, the day would have been a Saturday.)

The main function remains restricted to the Sanamahi Temple at Imphal. The attendees have grown in number over the years but of late, the event has taken on more peaceful forms—for example, books are no more being burnt for portraying Meiteis as Hindus. Brandt notes these commemorations to "serve the construction of a history of oppression" and thus, strengthen Meitei nationalism.

== Bibliography ==
- Aggarwal, Kailash S. (1992-01-01). "To Include or Not to Include: An Attempt to Study the Language Conflict in Manipur". Language Problems and Language Planning. 16 (1): 31. doi:10.1075/lplp.16.1.02agg. ISSN 0272-2690.
- Brandt, Carmen (2018-01-02). "Writing off domination: the Chakma and Meitei script movements". South Asian History and Culture. 9 (1): 116–140. doi:10.1080/19472498.2017.1411050. ISSN 1947-2498. S2CID 148911026.
- Chelliah, Shobhana L. (2005). "Asserting Nationhood through Personal Name Choice: The Case of the Meithei of Northeast India". Anthropological Linguistics. 47 (2): 169–216. ISSN 0003-5483. JSTOR 25132326.
- Gurumayum, Maheshwar (12 January 2015). "Panthoibi Sindam Sanglen appeals not to differ the date of Puya Mei Thaba". Imphal Times.
- Kabui, Gangmumei (1991). "The Zenith and Decline". History of Manipur: Pre-colonial period. National Publishing House. ISBN 978-81-214-0362-7.
- Parratt, Saroj Nalini Arambam (2005). The Court Chronicle of the Kings of Manipur : the Cheitharon Kumpapa : Original Text, Translation, and Notes. London: Routledge. ISBN 0-415-34430-1.
- Ray, Sohini (2000). The sacred alphabet and the divine body: The case of Meitei mayek in north-eastern India (Thesis). University of California, Los Angeles.
- Ray, Sohini (2009). "Writing the Body: Cosmology, Orthography, and Fragments of Modernity in Northeastern India". Anthropological Quarterly. 82 (1): 132. ISSN 0003-5491. JSTOR 25488260.
- Ray, Sohini (2015). "Boundaries Blurred? Folklore, Mythology, History and the Quest for an Alternative Genealogy in North-east India". Journal of the Royal Asiatic Society. 25 (2): 247–267. ISSN 1356-1863. JSTOR 43307692.
- Roy, Jyotirmoy (1973). History of Manipur (2 ed.). Eastlight Book House.
- Sebastian, Rodney (2019). Cultural Fusion in a Religious Dance Drama: Building the Sacred Body in the Manipuri Rāslīlās (Thesis). University of Florida. ProQuest 2464172212.
- Sebastian, Rodney (December 2021). "Refashioning Kingship in Manipur in the 18th Century: The Politico-Religious Projects of Garibniwaz and Bhagyacandra". Religions. 12 (12): 1041. doi:10.3390/rel12121041. ISSN 2077-1444.
- Singh, Aheibam Koireng; Singh, Sanasam Amal (2014). Bonfire of Books: Cataclysmic Rupture in the Early 18th Century Manipur. Centre for Manipur Studies, Manipur University. ISBN 978-81-8334-057-1.
- Singh, Chabungbam Amuba (3 March 2014). "Puya Meithaba: The Date Controversy". The Sangai Express.
- Singh, Ch. Manihar (1996). A History of Manipuri Literature. Sahitya Akademi. ISBN 978-81-260-1586-3.
