= Writers' Rescue Centre =

The Writers' Rescue Centre is an Indian not-for-profit organisation that assists people who are experiencing mental health problems. It encourages and assists such people to write down their thoughts as a form of therapy. The center was founded by social entrepreneur and author, Nikhil Chandwani, and is active in Nagpur, Visakhapatnam, Hyderabad, Georgia, and Singapore. It provides individual mentors who work on a one-on-one basis with the center's clients. It also works with novice writers to provide them with practical assistance and mentors in completing and publishing their work and subsequently marketing it and finding further writing and speaking opportunities. Writers' Rescue Center has assisted in the publication of more than 70 books to date.

== See also ==
- Manipuri Sahitya Parishad
- Sahitya Akademi
