= Meitei classical language movement =

Social movement in India

Movement of Meitei language to achieve classical language status
- "Meitei Lon" (literally meaning "Meitei language"), written in Meitei script
- English name: Movement of Meitei language to achieve classical language status
- Time: 2013 - present
- Duration: 2013 - present
- Location: Bangladesh, Myanmar, Northeast India (Assam, Manipur and Tripura)
- Type: Social movement
- Theme: Language movement
- Cause: Inclusion of the Meitei (Manipuri) language in the list of Classical Languages of India
- Motive: Prestige and Honours of the Classical languages of India
- Patrons: Government of Manipur; Directorate of Language Planning and Implementation
- Organised by: Government of Manipur; Manipuri Sahitya Parishad; Meetei Erol Eyek Loinasillol Apunba Lup; Sathoulup (Sahitya Thoupang Lup); Wakhallon Mannaba Apunba, Kangleipak
- Participants: Leishemba Sanajaoba, Rajya Sabha Member of Parliament; Chungkham Yashobanta Professor of the Department of Linguistics], Manipur University; Langpoklakpam Jayantakumar Singh, former Minister of Art & Culture Department of the government of Manipur; Moirangthem Nara, member of Manipur Legislative Assembly; Nongthombam Biren Singh, Chief Minister of Manipur; Okram Ibobi Singh, former Chief Minister of Manipur; Paonam Gunindro, Professor of the Department of Manipuri, Manipur University; Thongam Biswajit Singh, member of Manipur Legislative Assembly; Thounaojam Basanta Kumar, Education Minister of Manipur; Vinod Kumar Duggal, 14th Governor of Manipur; and others

The Meitei language (officially known as Manipuri) movement seeks to achieve recognition of Meitei as a Classical language of India. It was supported by various literary, political, social associations and organisations as well as notable individual personalities of Bangladesh, Myanmar, Northeast India (prominently Assam, Manipur and Tripura).

Chungkham Yashawanta, professor of the Department of Linguistics at Manipur University, is of the opinion that the very social movement is not an easy task, having no room for agitation, and is of purely academic work, needing linguists, historians, archeologists, anthropologists and literary persons. However, Dr. Moirangthem Nara, a former cabinet minister for Arts and Culture and Sericulture of the government of Manipur and a member of Manipur Legislative Assembly, is of the opinion that no demands could be met in India and Manipur without agitation.

== Background ==
=== 2004 – 2012 ===
In the year 2004, the government of India set up an official category of Classical languages of India. An expert committee had suggested strict criteria for languages to qualify, for example, that the language should have been in existence for 1,000 years.

The government of India announced some requiremfor a language to ge considered Classical.

- High antiquity of its early texts/recorded history over a period of 1500–2000 years;
- A body of ancient literature/texts, which is considered a valuable heritage by generations of speakers;
- The literary tradition be original and not borrowed from another speech community;
- The classical language and literature being distinct from modern, there may also be a discontinuity between the classical language and its later forms or its offshoots.

For the languages which are declared as classical languages, three benefits are granted by the government of India.

- Two major annual international awards for scholars of eminence in the concerned language.
- 'Centre of Excellence for Studies in Classical Languages' can be set up.
- The University Grants Commission can be requested to create, to start with at least in Central Universities, a certain number of professional chairs for classical languages, for scholars of eminence in the concerned language.

=== 2013-2014 ===
In 2013, after learning, the possibility of classical language status for Meitei began to be discussed at various book released and cultural events.

July 2013, A. Balkrishna Sharma, the then vice-president of Naharol Sahitya Premee Samiti, said "We are also proud to claim Manipuri as a classical language because of the rich tradition of writing maintained by our forefathers".

Chungkham Yashawanta, a professor of the Department of Linguistics, Manipur University wrote that to fulfill the four criteria for a classical language, there is a need for the scientific analysis of Meitei language and Meitei script, the prehistory and the unbroken history of Manipur, Meitei culture (including religious, philosophical, ideological and artistic traditions), origin and development of Meitei literature, and others.

== Fulfilling the criteria and subsequent social efforts ==
=== 2014 ===
During June 2014, Vinod Kumar Duggal, the then Governor of Manipur, announced that he had already taken initial steps to have Meitei declared a Classical Language of India. He requested that Manipur Minister of Education M Okendrajit and the governof Manipur accelerate the process and to provide funds to scholars who could contribute.

In August 2014, Chungkham Yashawanta, a gave a public lecture on the Essential ingredients needed to transform Meitei into a classical language, as part of Manipuri Language Day. On the same day, Moirangthem Nara, a Member of Manipur Legislative Assembly, publicly stated that no demand could be met in India and Manipur without agitation, so to advance the cause, ongoing agitation needed to continue.

=== 2015 ===
During May 2015, at its 80th annual meeting, the functionaries of the Manipuri Sahitya Parishad urged the state government of Manipur to put in the necessary effort to have Meitei language recognised as a classical language. Gaikhangam Gangmei, the then deputy chief minister of Manipur a guest at the event, promised that he would do so.

=== 2016 ===
In May 2016, the Manipuri Sahitya Parishad resolved to exert pressure on the central government of India for the recognition of Meitei language as a classical language. The resolution was supported by Okram Ibobi Singh, the then Chief Minister of Manipur.

On Manupuri Language Day in August 2016, Meitei speakers in Bangladesh, Myanmar and North Eastern India (mostly from Assam, Tripura and Manipur), demanded that Meitei be named a classical language. The Sahitya Seva Samiti, Manipur-Kakching celebrated the event with the theme Manipuri Language should be enlisted in classical language category. The Manipur Language Day Celebration Committee organised a similar event at Lamyanba Shanglen, Palace Compound, Imphal, in which Paonam Gunindro, a professor at Manipur University, gave a public lecture, Let's make Manipuri language an Indian classical language Meitei: Manipuri Lol Bharatki Classical Lol Oihansi.

=== 2017 ===
Throughout 2017 and 2018, scholars argued that the Meitei language fulfilled the criteria laid down by the government of India for a Classical language.

During August 2017, Thongam Biswajit Singh, then Manipur Minister of Works, Rural Development and Panchayati Raj, Commerce and Industries and Information and Public Relations Minister urged the people for a collective effort for the recognition of Meitei language.

=== 2018 ===
Notably, on 21 February 2018, at an event of the International Mother Language Day in Imphal, Paonam Gunindro, a professor of the "Department of Manipuri" of Manipur University, while delivering a lecture on "Manipuri Lol and Classical language", said that all the four criteria for the declaration of a language as a "classical language" is touched by Meitei language.

During April 2018, the Directorate of Language Planning and Implementation of the government of Manipur organized a three-day conference on the topic "Classical Language Status in respect of Manipuri Language" at the conference hall of Manipur State Guest House, Sanjenthong, Imphal. Langpoklakpam Jayantakumar Singh, the then minister of Art & Culture Department of the government of Manipur, as a chief guest of the event, assured that he will take a leading role in the efforts of attaining classical language status for Meitei language for the sake of future generations. Thokchom Radheshyam Singh, the then minister of the Education Department of the government of Manipur, as a president of the event, while calling upon the people to involve in the movement for inclusion of Meitei language in the classical language list.

During June 2018, on the occasion of World Music Day held at Shri Shri Bal Mukunda Dev Music College, Palace Compound, Imphal, Langpoklakpam Jayantakumar Singh, the then minister of Art & Culture Department of the government of Manipur, as a chief guest of the event, while delivering a speech on music, took the opportunity to announce that steps to include Meitei language in the list of Indian classical languages had already been taken up.

During July 2018, on the occasion of the 30th annual meeting of "Writers Forum Manipur", a meeting resolved to urge the central government of India to recognise Meitei language as a "classical language". The event was held at the Manipur Hindi Parishad, Imphal.

During August 2018, Dr. Laishram Mahabir Singh, the director of the Directorate of Language Planning and Implementation, announced that a comprehensively planned proposal was set up to urge the authority concerned to include Meitei language in the classical language of India, for which a high level committee would be formed for the very purpose and a proposal would be sent to the Ministry of Culture, India within that year.

=== 2019 ===
During August 2019, on the Meitei Language Day (Manipuri language day), Thongam Biswajit Singh, the then works minister of the government of Manipur, proposed a temporary or ad hoc committee as there was no language commission to spearhead the effort for inclusion of Meitei language as a "classical language" of India. He also said that the matter could be discussed in the Cabinet in the appropriate time.

== King's leading efforts ==
=== 2020 ===
In the year 2020, Leishemba Sanajaoba, the present King of Manipur, was elected as a member of parliament of the Rajya Sabha from the Bharatiya Janata Party (BJP). As soon as he joined politics, he sought attention of the central government of India to recognise Meitei language as a "classical language". In the Rajya Sabha, during September 2020, he asserted that Meitei language has all the elements needed for alleviation to the status of a classical language. The proposal was made during one parliament session held during the COVID-19 pandemic. The government of India had responded to him asking for the submission of necessary documents to prove that it fulfils the essential criteria to get the status of "classical language".

Sanajaoba informed Manipur's chief minister regarding the central government's response and a committee comprising officials from the Directorate of Language Planning and Implementation and also Directorate of Art and Culture was formed in the very year. In the later years, he was the spearheading leader of the classical language movement.

=== 2021 ===
During August 2021, on the Meitei Language Day, Leishemba Sanajaoba released a video clip message from his office in New Delhi, announcing that the central government of India led by Prime Minister Narendra Modi was considering the proposal and was ready to take up necessary steps in recognition of Meitei language as a "classical language". In the same video, he further stated that it is up to the state government of Manipur to submit relevant recommendations without which the central government could not do much.

=== 2022 ===
==== June 2022 ====
During June 2022, at the opening session of two-day 88th foundation celebration of Manipuri Sahitya Parishad, Imphal cum 87th annual meet of the Parishad at JN Manipur Dance Academy auditorium, Leisemba Sanajaoba confidently announced that 70 percent of the process for enlisting Meitei language as the 7th classical language of India have already been completed and the language will surely get the "classical language" status. He also announced that an empowered committee, constituted by the state government of Manipur, along with experts, would be forwarded to the central government of India and the very committee would be formed soon to send the recommendation.

==== July 2022 ====
During July 2022, while talking to the Imphal Free Press during a programme held at Babupara in Imphal, Th Basantakumar, minister of Education Department of the government of Manipur, said that the government had planned a roadmap to collect and prepare all necessary documents and submit them to the Ministry of Culture by September of the very year.

==== September 2022 ====
During the first week of September 2022, the annual general body meeting of the "Writer's Forum, Manipur", organised at Manipur Hindi Parishad, Imphal, issued a statement appealing to the central government of India, to take up the essential steps to include Meitei language as an Indian classical language.

During the second week of September 2022, the Directorate of Language Planning and Implementation finalised the documents required for recognition of Meitei as an Indian classical language. The documents were then submitted to Leishemba Sanajaoba. The efforts of the preparation of the documents were helped by DLPI director Th. Chitra, Manipur's chief minister N Biren Singh, besides the scholars and the members of language committee.

== Negligences and grievances ==
During a January 2022 meeting with the Wakhallon Mannaba Apunba (WAMA), Leishemba Sanajaoba expressed that he was deeply unsatisfied with the Department of Language Planning and Implementation's negligence in the documentation works for inclusion of Meitei language among the classical languages. The WAMA expressed that these negligences of the Language Department will make the efforts of Sanajaoba, of raising his voice in the Rajya Sabha, go unsuccessful. The WAMA asked the state government of Manipur for the change of the present director of the Department of Language Planning and Implementation. According to the WAMA, Chitra, the present director, is unfit to hold her official position due to her neglecting and irresponsible acts. The WAMA demanded the DLPI director either to resign the official position or to show the proofs of the progress regarding the efforts to include Meitei language as an Indian classical language. They stated that they would launch an agitation to appoint another director of the committee if the present director failed to show proofs of progress within seven days.

== See also ==
- Language Movement Day
- Language revitalization
- Meitei associate official language movement
