= Puya (Meitei texts) =

Collection of Meitei written records, Meetei

Puyas
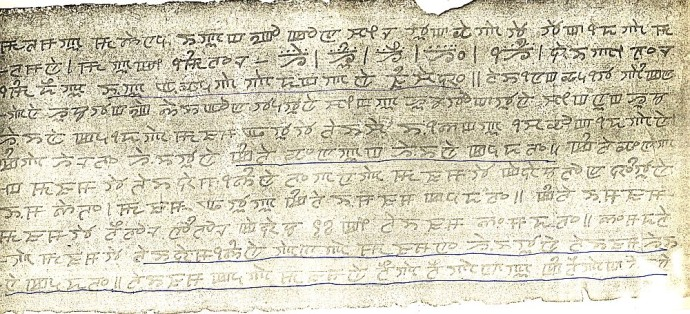
- (Meitei: ꯄꯨꯌꯥ ꯂꯥꯢꯔꯤꯛ, romanized: pooyaa laaireek)
- Language: Meitei language
- No. of books: more than 120

The Puyas (Meitei: ꯄꯨꯌꯥ) are archaic Manipuri manuscripts. They encompass a wide spectrum of themes including genealogy, literature, history, royalties, administration, creation and cosmology, philosophy, poetry, religious beliefs, etc.

Saroj Parratt noted in 2005 that none of these Puyas were yet to be dated by professional historians or subject to serious textual-critical scrutiny. Consequently, she criticized the tendency of local authors to treat puyas as reliable sources in their reconstruction of Manipuri history. Scholars have noted that puyas had been forged by Meitei nationalists to support their reinvention of history and tradition.

== See also ==
- Meitei literature
- Sanamahism
- Puya Meithaba

== Bibliography ==
- Brandt, Carmen (5 December 2017). "Writing off domination: the Chakma and Meitei script movements". South Asian History and Culture. doi:10.1080/19472498.2017.1411050. ISSN 1947-2498.
- Laishram, Sadhana. "Conservation and preservation of Manuscripts in Manipur" (PDF).
- Naorem, Naorem Malemsanba (2015). "Centrality of body politics in Thokachanba's script and cultural revivalism in Manipur". Colonialism and Resistance: Society and State in Manipur. London: Routledge. ISBN 9781315638317.
- Rajshekhar, M. "In violence-scarred Manipur, ancient scrolls show why AFSPA will not work". Scroll.in.
- Parratt, Saroj Nalini Arambam (2005). The Court Chronicle of the Kings of Manipur: The Cheitharon Kumpapa : Original Text, Translation, and Notes. London: Routledge. ISBN 0-415-34430-1.
- Naorem, Deepak (October 2022). "Taming the 'rude' and 'barbarous' tongues of the frontier: Bor Saheps, Sutu Saheps and their encounters with languages, scripts, and texts (1835–1904)". The Indian Economic & Social History Review. 59 (4): 471–506. doi:10.1177/00194646221130814. ISSN 0019-4646.

history
