= Meitei linguistic purism movement =

Meitei linguistic event

Movement to attain linguistic purity in the Meitei language
- "Meitei Lon" (literally meaning "Meitei language"), written in Meitei script
- Type: Linguistic purism
- Cause: Foreign language anxiety; Linguistic insecurity
- Target: Linguistically pure Meitei language
- Organised by: Indigenous People's Association of Kangleipak; Meetei Erol Eyek Loinasillol Apunba Lup; South East Asia Cultural Organisation
- Participants: Chingsubam Akaba

The Meitei linguistic purity movement is a political and social language reform movement that aims to purge the Meitei language of foreign elements (such as loanwords from Hindi, Sanskrit, and English) and promote a supposedly purer form of Meitei. The movement includes literary, political, and social organisations as well as notable members of government.

The movement has sometimes veered into censorship.

== Manipuri Lexicon Committee ==
During August 2014, Meetei Erol Eyek Loinasillol Apunba Lup, 'United Forum for Safeguarding Manipuri Script and Language' (MEELAL) appealed to Meitei-language writers to avoid the use of loanwords from other languages. The Manipuri Lexicon Committee convened to investigate the use of loan words in Meitei works. In September 2014, the Committee approved Meitei literature textbooks for secondary school classes 9 and 10. During December 2014, MEELAL investigated books published by the Manipur Board of Secondary Education for classes 1-10.

MEELAL also announced that schools should not keep any books that don't abide by its rules. In December 2014, at MEELAL's head office in Imphal, volunteers tore up and banned three books that were found to contain non-native words. Earlier, the authors had ignored the Lexicon Committee's demands for "correction" of the language. The books were Kainya, a book of poetry by Punshiba Soibam, Sahitya Neinarol Anouba, by Bhorot Sanasam, and Manglan Khara Saktam Khara a book of short stories by Khundongbam Gokulchandra.

During December 2014, the Meitei-language film Court Marriage was banned by MEELAL for containing foreign language words. Its director, Bimol Phibou, was banned from filmmaking for not responding to the organization's summons.

In February 2015, MEELAL sought to ban songs in "fusional" forms of Meitei from All India Radio and Doordarshan.

== Native language naming ==
In August 2019, the Manipur Legislative Assembly renamed the former Tulihal International Airport (also known as Imphal International Airport) to Bir Tikendrajit International Airport. The change was strongly opposed by the South East Asia Cultural Organisation on the grounds that the government should have chosen an indigenous name, and due to the lack of consultation. The Indigenous People's Association of Kangleipak also urged the government to reconsider its decision and give the airport an indigenous name, suggesting Athouba Koirengsana, which is a Meitei-language name of Bir Tikendrajit. The former official name, Tulihal International Airport referred to Ebudhou Tulihal, a local guardian deity. The Khongjom War Memorial Trust also opposed the government's decision.

In December 2021, MEELAL opposed the Manipri Education Minister's proposal rename the Meitei script, replacing the wholly indigenous Meitei mayek, 'Meitei script' with the Sanskritized Manipuri eyek. MEELAL warned the minister that they and the general public would agitate if he pursued the idea.

== See also ==
- Foreign language anxiety
- Language shift
- Linguistic insecurity
- Schizoglossia
- Hindi imposition
- Sanskritisation
- Pure Tamil movement
