= Chingsubam Akaba =

Indian Sanamahist cultural revivalist (b. 1944 - d. 2007)

Personal life
- Born: Chingsubam Akaba; 9 November 1944; Soibam Leikai, Imphal, India
- Died: 1 January 2007; Soibam Leikai
- Spouse: Chingsubam Wangambi
- Known for: Luchingpurel Oja Akaba

Religious life
- Religion: Sanamahism
- Founder of: Meetei National Front
- Sect: Sanamahi laining

Chingsubam Akaba (9 November 1944 – 1 January 2007) was an Indian Sanamahist revivalist.

== Social activities ==
Akaba was the founding president of MEELAL. He established MEELAL on 18 August 2003 in order to aid the Meetei Mayek movement. MEELAL observes 18 May every year as the Mayek Chatpa Numit to mark the publication of a white paper on the issue of scripts by the State Government on 18 May 2005, which led to introduction of Meetei Mayek in the school syllabus from class I to X in 2006.

== Politics ==
He founded Meetei National Front in 1979 on the 23rd Day of Wakching (December). Oja Akaba joined the Manipur People's Party (MPP) for the 2007 general election in the state of Manipur.

== Death ==
Oja Akaba was shot at point blank range near the gate of his house at the midnight of 31 December 2006.The incident happened when he went out to see off his driver after attending a musical concert at Palace Compound on 31 December night 2006. He was dropped at his residence at Soibam Leikai by his driver at 12:10 am. The driver saw two unidentified people shoot him twice.
