= Manipuri Language Day =

Annual event dedicated to Meitei language

- Official name: Manipuri Language Day
- Also called: "Imalongi Numit" (transl. The Day of Our Mother Language)
- Observed by: Manipur (Meitei: Kangleipak): Government of Manipur; Department of Art and Culture; Directorate of Language Planning and Implementation (DLPI); Manipuri Sahitya Parishad; Patriotic Writers' Forum (PAWF), Manipur and Tripura; All Manipur Students' Union (AMSU); Marup Organisation Lalshingmura, Tripura; and many others
- Significance: the day on which Meitei language (officially known as Manipuri language) was included in the Eighth Schedule to the Constitution of India and made one of the languages with official status in India on 20 August 1992
- Date: 20 August
- Next time: 20 August 2027
- Frequency: Annual
- Related to: Meitei language (officially known as Manipuri language) being included in the Eighth Schedule to the Constitution of India

Manipuri Language Day (Meitei: Manipuri Longi Numit; /ma-nee-poo-ree lon-gee noo-meet/), is an annual celebration of the Manipuri (Meitei) language in India and Bangladesh on 20 August. It is the day in 1992 on which Manipuri was added to the Eighth Schedule to the Constitution of India, making it one of the official languages of India.

== Annual events in India ==
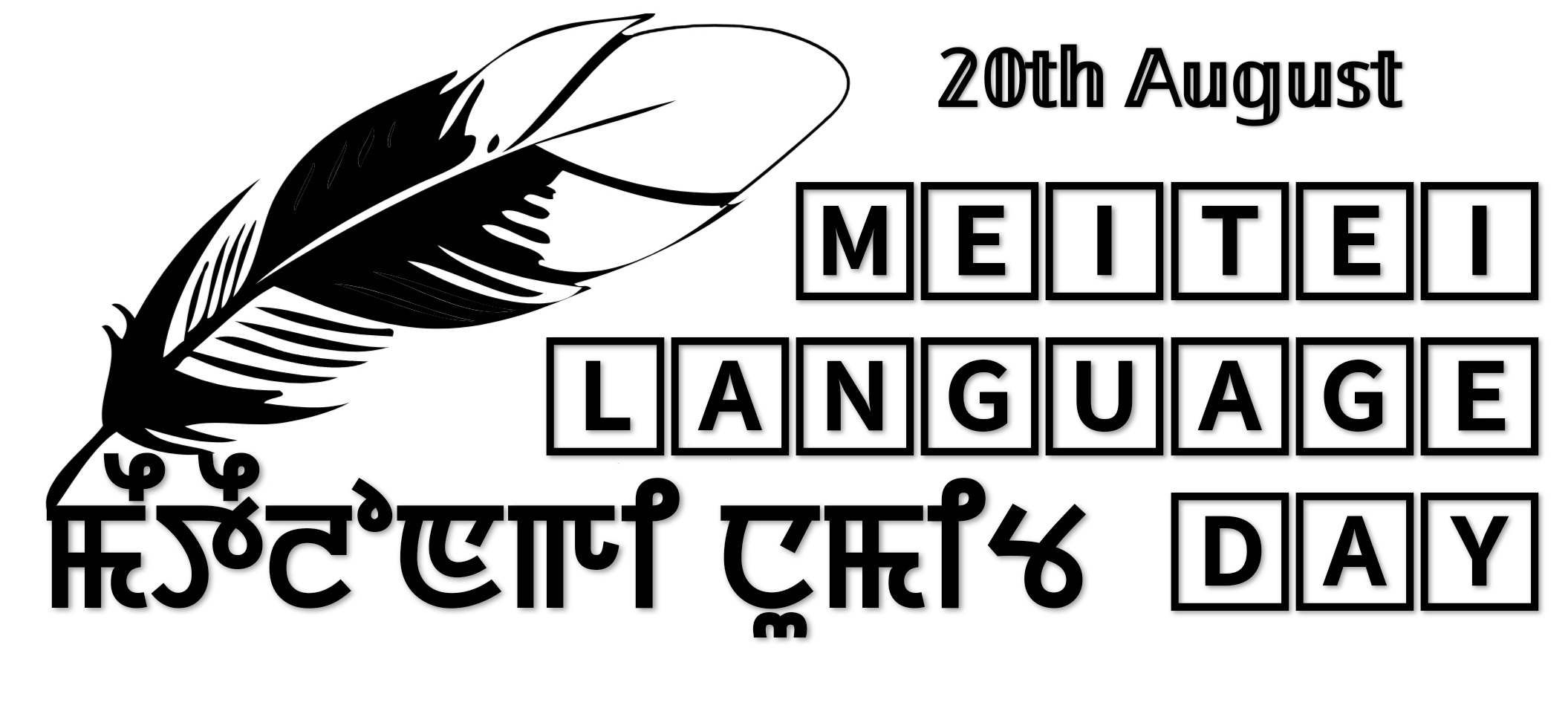
Meitei language day

=== 2023 - 32nd event ===
In the year 2023, the 32nd Meitei language day was celebrated by different groups in different places. Rajkumar Ranjan, the then Minister of State (MoS) of Ministry of External Affairs and Ministry of Education of the Union Government of India, extended his wishes to the people of Manipur and gave salute to the language activists who had worked hard to include the language in the Eighth Schedule to the Constitution of India. He announced that the Ministry of Education of the Union Government of India gave directives to the Indira Gandhi National Open University (IGNOU) for the commencement of different courses in Meitei language. (Note: Meitei language (officially called Manipuri language) is already in the syllabus of the Indira Gandhi National Open University (IGNOU) even before the minister announces for the commencement of different courses in the very language.)

In one celebration by the Manipuri Language Day State Level Celebration Committee at the Iboyaima Shumang Leela Shanglen in Palace Compound, the event was attended by the members of Manipuri Sahitya Parishad, Manipur State Shumang Leela Council, Film Forum Manipur and Writers' Union Imphal. In the event, Leihaothabam Sharatchandra, the convenor of Manipuri Language Day State Level Celebration Committee, told to the public:

"We cannot preserve and promote Manipuri language, if we are not proud of having our own language and script".

The event showed that the knowledge of one's mother language is of the top importance in comparison to others, even though knowing different languages is good.

The event was also celebrated by the Naharol Sahitya Premee Samiti and the Cultural Forum Manipur.

The event was also celebrated by the Directorate of Regional Indian Languages & Research (DRILR) and the Manipur International University (MIU) at the Conference Hall of MIU in Ghari, Imphal West district. Harikumar Pallathadka, the Chancellor of Manipur International University (MIU), stressed the essentialism of the "Manipur State Language Commission & State Language Policy" in order to preserve and promote both Meitei language, which is already tabled for the official recognition of classical language status, as well as the vernaculars of Manipur. The event was attended by members of the Ministry of Home Affairs (India), UNESCO Club Manipur, AIR Imphal, people from Montreal, Mysore, and the officials of CIIL, Government of India. In the event, Yumnam Nouba Meetei was bestowed with the prestigious "Prof Dr R Subbakrishna Memorial Community Linguist Award 2023", for his selfless dedication and contribution to the revitalization of Meitei language and script. A symposium was also organised on the topic, "Mother tongue from indigenous perspective, our language, our pride".

The event was also separately celebrated by the Manipur People's Party (MPP), the Manipuri Department of Manipur University (MU), as well as the Wakhallon Mannaba Apunba (WAMA), Kangleipak.

=== 2022 - 31st event ===
In the year 2022, Manipur's Chief Minister Nongthombam Biren Singh, while giving a speech at a function in the event, compared Meitei speaking community with the endangered Sangai deer. Leisemba Sanajaoba, the Rajya Sabha Member of Parliament, attended the state level event, as the guest of honor. In the event, he said that the Central Government of India has given positive response to him regarding the inclusion of Meitei language as the Classical language of India. He further added that he had urged the Indian government officials to include Meitei script alongside the Bengali script for Meitei language in the civil service examinations (including but not limited to the Union Public Service Commission and the Manipur Public Service Commission exams), to end the problems faced by the students. The state level celebration of the event was collectively organised by the team works of 17 different organisations which are: (1) Manipuri Sahitya Parishad; (2) The Cultural Forum Manipur; (3) Naharol Sahitya Premee Samiti; (4) Manipuri Language Development Committee; (5) EPATHOUKOK; (6) LEIKOL; (7) SATHOULUP; (8) IMAKHOL; (9) Manipur State Sumang Leela Council; (10) Writers' Forum Manipur; (11) Manipuri Literary Society; (12) AMMIK; (13) Film Forum Manipur; (14) Arts Society Manipur; (15) Theatre Centre Manipur; (16) Patriotic Writers' Forum and (17) Writers' Union.

The "Wakhallon Mannaba Apunba" (WAMA), Kangleipak, declared the winners of the poetry competition held on the topic 'Maton Chongkhatlakliba Meetei Lon' (Meitei: ꯃꯇꯣꯟ ꯆꯣꯡꯈꯠꯂꯛꯂꯤꯕ ꯃꯤꯇꯩꯂꯣꯟ lit. Meiteilon in the budding stage).

=== 2021 - 30th event ===
In the year 2021, due to COVID-19 pandemic, the District Magistrate of Imphal East temporarily permitted for three hours on 20 August for the observation of the 30th edition of Meitei Language Day (Manipuri Language Day) in Imphal, Manipur. The permit was given to L. Sharatchandra, Convener of the State-level Manipuri Language Celebration Committee, on the 17 August. The three hours permit was valid from 1 p.m. to 4 p.m. on 20 August. Manipuri diasporas in other states of Northeast India, Bangladesh and Myanmar, who had contributed to Meitei literature (Manipuri literature), also participated in the event.

=== 2020 - 29th event ===
In the year 2021, as a part of the event on the day, the Manipur University Student's Union (MUSU) organized symposium on the theme "Preservation and prospect of Manipuri Language for the future generation" in the Manipur University, Imphal. The students' union unanimously resolved to demand the Government of Manipur for the amendment to the 1979 Official Language Act as "Manipuri written in Meetei Mayek" instead of "Manipuri written in Bengali" and for the introduction of a policy for the promotion of Meitei language and Meitei script (Meitei: Meitei Mayek) in Assam, Meghalaya and Tripura as well as in Bangladesh and Myanmar. The Students' Union also asked the Manipur Government to give pressure to the Assam Government to recognise Meitei language as one of the associate official languages of Assam. Besides, other demands from the same organization include the reformation of Manipur Language Directorate, the reinstating of the Manipur Language Training Academy, the establishment of one exclusive repository institution for studying and researching the PuYas among others.

Other than the observation in Imphal Valley of Manipur, the event was observed in Jiribam by the Manipuri Sahitya Parishad Jiribam (MSPJ) as well as in Tripura and Hailakandi, Assam.

=== 2019 - 28th event ===
In the year 2019, the event was organised under the theme "ꯃꯅꯤꯄꯨꯔꯤ ꯂꯣꯟ ꯆꯥꯎꯈꯠꯍꯟꯕꯗ ꯂꯝꯗꯝꯁꯤꯒꯤ ꯌꯦꯜꯍꯧ ꯂꯣꯟꯁꯤꯡꯁꯨ ꯆꯥꯎꯈꯠꯍꯟꯕ ꯇꯉꯥꯏꯐꯗꯦ ꯫" ("Manipuri Lon Chaokhat Hanbada Lamdam Sigi Yelhou Lonsingsu Chaokhat Hanba Tangaiphade"). BJP Minister Thongam Biswajit Singh gave a speech in promoting the efforts of the inclusion of the Manipuri language in the Classical languages of India. He proposed a temporary committee to spearhead the efforts to the inclusion of Manipuri in the Classical Languages of India if there was no Language Commission available by that time. Manipur Government's Health and Family Welfare Minister Langpoklakpam Jayantakumar Singh said that instead of saying just "Meitei language", if everyone could say "Manipuri language", then it would have a wider connotation and accommodation in all the languages of Manipur. On the day at a separate venue, DM College of Arts of the Dhanamanjuri University collaborating with YK College of Wangjing, Manipur organised a one-day seminar on "Manipuri language in the global context". Besides, the event was organised by various associations including Patriotic Writers Forum (PAWF) at Manipur Press Club, Manipur Language Development Society (MALADES) in Imphal and District Institute of Education & Training (DIET) in Koirengei.

=== 2018 - 27th event ===
In the year 2018, the event was organised in the state level by the 13 committees working together under a single roof which are (1) Manipuri Sahitya Parishad, (2) Naharol Sahitya Premee Samiti, (3) Manipuri Language Development Committee, (4) Epathoukok, (5) Manipuri Literary Society, (6) Writers Forum Imphal, (7) Leimarol Khorjeikhol (LEIKOL), (8) Sathoulup, (9) Patriotic Writers Forum Manipur, (10) Imakhol, (11) Manipur State Shumang Leela Council, (12) Apunba Manipur Matam Ishei Kanglup (AMMIK) and (13) Film Forum Manipur at the Maharaj Chandrakirti Auditorium in Imphal. Other than the state level celebration, the event was also observed by the All Manipur Students' Union (AMSU).

=== 2017 - 26th event ===
In the year 2017, the event was celebrated at state level organised by the 14 organisations. During a function, a Meetei Mayek training course was inaugurated at the Manipuri Basti ME School in Guwahati, Assam. The event was organised by Patriotic Writers Forum in Manipur and Marup Organisation Lalshingmura, Tripura. In Assam, the event was organised by Aieba Lup Assam, Hojai. "Sahitya Sevak", an award instituted by the organisation was given to Binoychand Koijam from Guwahati, Thangjam Amar, Diphu and Gopi Meitram from Lanka, Assam.

=== 2016 - 25th event ===
In the year 2016, on the day of the event, the "Classical Language" status was demanded by the Manipuri speaking people in Bangladesh, Myanmar and the North East India, especially Assam, Tripura and Manipur. They said the language meets all the criteria for the "Classical Language" status. One day before the commemoration day, a 48-hour general strike was called by the followers of the Inner Line Permit (ILP) movement on account of the arrest of their leader Khomdram Ratan. The strike had drastically affected the normal life in Manipur during that time but they ended the strike at midnight that very day just for the sake of the celebration of Manipuri Language Day on the next day.

=== 2015 - 24th event ===
In the year 2015, "ꯃꯅꯤꯄꯨꯔ ꯀꯟꯁꯤ, ꯃꯅꯤꯄꯨꯔꯤ ꯂꯣꯟ ꯍꯤꯡꯍꯟꯁꯤ" ("Manipur Kansi, Manipuri Lon Hinghansi") was the main theme for the organisation of the event. Sahitya Academy Awardee and columnist OC Meira gave a speech about the role of print media in developing Meitei language while Professor Chirom Rajketan talked on the role of the language in developing the society of Manipur. All Manipur Students' Union (AMSU) also organised the event in the Dhanamanjuri University. In Khangabok, Manipur, the Patriotic Writers' Forum, Manipur and KM Blooming Higher Secondary School organised the event in which poetry recitation and poetry writing competition on the theme "Imarol" (literally, mother tongue in Meitei language) and "Indigenous people" was held. In Tripura, the event was organised by the Patriotic Writers' Forum, Tripura. In the event, politician Ramendra Narayan Debbarma praised the language by saying that Manipuri writers of Tripura have put more efforts to promote Manipuri language than the writers of Kokborok language did for their respective language.

=== 2014 - 23rd event ===
In the year 2014, the event coincided with the 1st anniversary of Directorate of Language Planning & Implementation. A speech about "ꯃꯅꯤꯄꯨꯔꯤ ꯂꯣꯜꯅ ꯀ꯭ꯂꯥꯁꯤꯀꯦꯜ ꯂꯦꯡꯒ꯭ꯋꯦꯖ ꯑꯣꯏꯅꯕꯒꯤ ꯄꯣꯠꯆꯪ" ("Manipuri Lol Na Classical Language Oinabagi Potchang") (essential ingredients of transforming Manipuri into a classical language) was given by Chungkham Yashobanta Singh of Department of Linguistics, Manipur University in the commemoration event. The celebration was jointly organised by (1) Cultural Forum Manipur, (2) Naharol Sahitya Premee Samiti, (3) Manipuri Literary Society, (4) Manipuri Lingual Development Committee, (5) Leimarol Khorjeikhol (LEIKOL) and (6) Manipur State Shumang Leela Council at the Dave Literature Centre, DM College campus of the Dhanamanjuri University. The Manipuri Sahitya Parishad and the All Manipur Students' Union (AMSU) also organised their respective functions separately at different places on the very day. The Patriotic Writers' Forum also organised the event at the Manipur Press Club.

=== 2013 - 22nd event ===
In the year 2013, the event was organised under the joint aegis of three organisations which are (1) Manipuri Language Development Committee, (2) Manipur State Shumang Leela Council and (3) Manipuri Naat Kanba Lup. In another function organised by the All Manipur Students' Association (AMSU), the Chief Guest was Sagolshem Saratchandra, who was the then President of AMSU in 1992 when the students' union was spearheading the pressure on the government to include Meitei language in the Eighth Schedule to the Indian Constitution. Saratchandra said that if the present day students did not willingly take up Manipuri as their main subject, the fate of the language would be very grim. He appealed to the students to consider the significance of taking Manipuri as the main subject instead of going crazy after English subject. Besides these, the event was also celebrated in other places including in Hojai, Assam.

=== 2012 - 21st event ===
In the year 2012, the event was organised in various locations by different associations, like the Manipuri Sahitya Parishad, Imphal in the Auditorium of Manipur Hindi Parishad, the All Manipur Students Union (AMSU) in DM College of the Dhanamanjuri University, the Patriotic Writers Forum, Manipur in New Checkon, the Manipuri Language Development Society (MALADES) at Ibudhou Thongju Lakpa Laibung in Thongju Part II of Thongju Assembly constituency, the Manipuri Literary Society and many others. A biannual edition of "Ngaklou" publication was released on the function organised by the Patriotic Writers Forum, Manipur.

== Annual events in Bangladesh ==
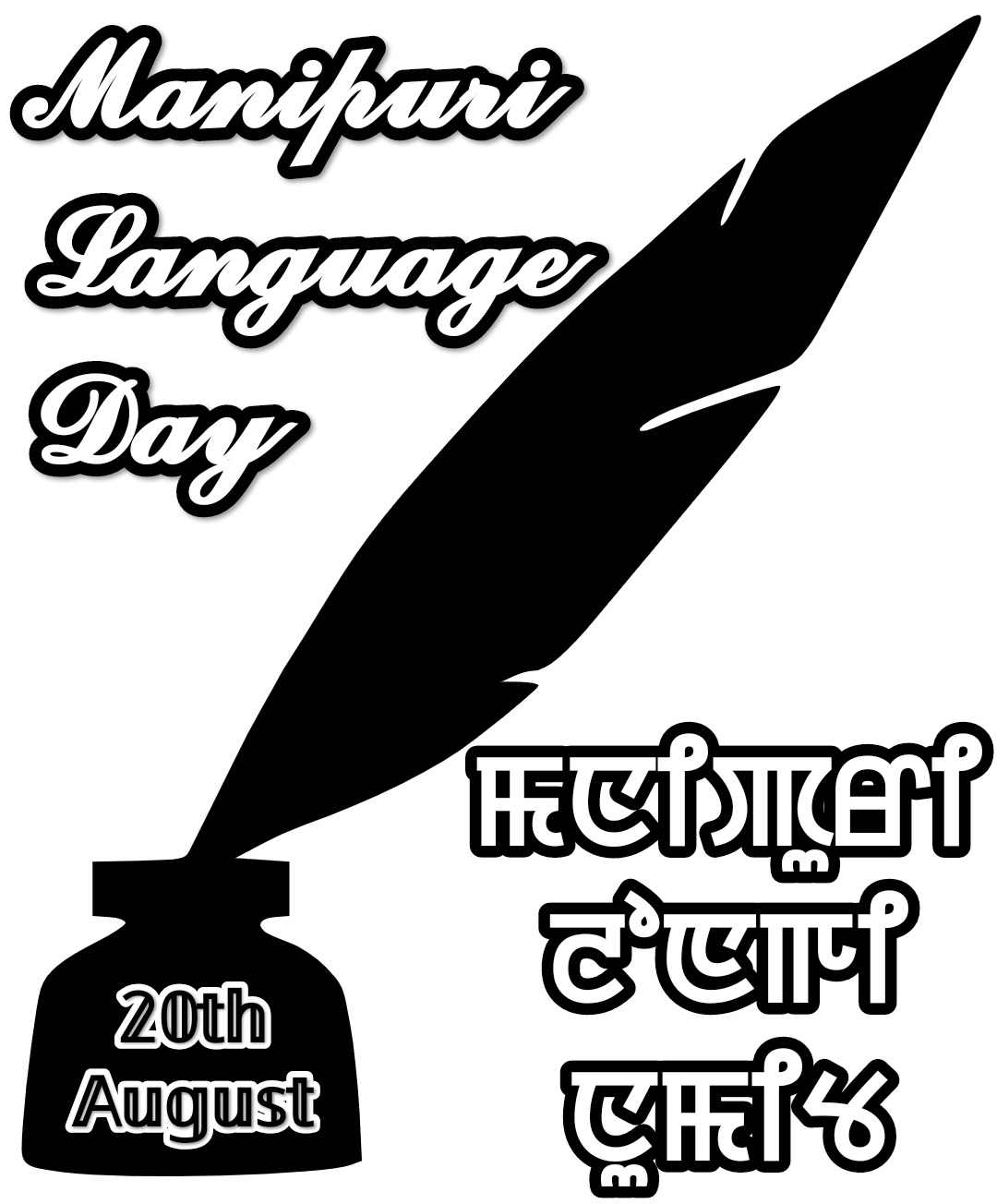
Manipuri language day

In 2022, the Meitei Language Day was celebrated in the People's Republic of Bangladesh, at Manipuri Kangshang, Nayapatand in Bhanugharh in Moulvibazar District. The event was conducted by the "Manipuri Language Research and Development Organisation, Bangladesh". The event was attended by Indian delegates alongside the notable linguistic personalities of Bangladesh, including professor Amar Yumnam of Manipur University (MU), professor Dr Homen Thangjam of the IGNOU, professor Jinen Laishramcha of the University of Seoul, South Korea and members of the "Manipur Cultural Complex, Bangladesh" and the "Manipuri Language Research and Development Organisation, Bangladesh".

The slogan for the event of that year was "Lets speak our mother tongue, write in our mother tongue, love our mother tongue".

== Award ceremony ==
On the day of the celebration of the Meitei Language Day, the Patriotic Writers' Forum bestow three awards to three prominent writers (either from inside or outside of Manipur) for composing short stories based on patriotic themes for Meitei literature (Manipuri literature) every year since 2008. The awards are (1) Pacha Meetei Literary Award, (2) R Kathing Tangkhul Literary Award and (3) Dr Saroj Nalini Parratt Literary Award. The awards consist of cash incentive, citation, memento and shawl.

Year	Pacha Meetei Literary Award recipients	R Kathing Tangkhul Literary Award recipients	Dr Saroj Nalini Parratt Literary Award recipients	Notes (References)
2022	Maibam Premojit	Devjani Yumnam	Khumanthem Aneshwori	
2021	No result	Nandeibam Pramoda	No result	
2019	Leishembi	Laishram Shyamo	Kesho Singh Irengba	
2018	Kiran Meikam	Tekcham Roshan	Sanatomba A.C.	
2017	Sadokpam Birjit Mangang	Ojitkumar Luwangcha	Sijagurumayum Suchitra Devi	
2016	Ch Ranbir Singh	Dr Umabati Athokpam	Thounaojam Shyam	
2015	Gunindro Khangenbam	Lenin Khumancha	Raju Maibam (from Assam)	
2014	Sanasam Umananda Singh	Dr Ningombam Rishnikumar	Kabrabam Nillakanta	
2013	Dr Nongmaithem Pramodini	Kartik Maiba	Yendrembam Randhirkumar	
2011	Aheibam Manilal	Laishangbam Dhananjoy	No result	

== Similar events ==
The following events are observed on the same day, 20 August:

- Feast of Asmá' (Baháʼí Faith, only if Baháʼí Naw-Rúz falls on 21 March)
- Indian Akshay Urja Day (India)
- Independence Restoration Day (Estonia), re-declaration of the independence of Estonia from the Soviet Union in 1991
- Revolution of the King and the People (Morocco)
- Saint Stephen's Day (Hungary)

== See also ==
- Meitei literature
- Meitei classical language movement
- Meitei associate official language movement
- List of epics in Meitei language
- List of Meitei-language films
- List of Meitei-language newspapers
- List of Meitei-language television channels
- List of Sahitya Akademi Award winners for Meitei
- List of Sahitya Akademi Translation Prize winners for Meitei
