= Meitei nationalism =

Nationalism of Kangleipak

The Salai Taret flag used by Meitei nationalists

Meitei nationalism (Meitei: ꯂꯩꯄꯥꯛ ꯅꯤꯡꯕ) refers to nationalism among the Meitei people. In the Meitei context this includes various movements throughout history to sustain Meitei cultural identity, political boundary, ethnicity and history to regain sovereign state status of Kangleipak (presently known as Manipur).

== History ==
Historically, the kingdom of Meitei also known as Meitei Leipak remained sovereign for at least 1951 years, although there were matrimonial alliance as well as wars with the neighbouring country or kingdom of Burma. Meitei kingdom (Meitei Leipak) lost its sovereignty in 1891 as a result of Anglo Manipur War and regained its sovereign status in 1947 but it was short lived due to the controversial Manipur Merger Agreement of 1949.

In the 19th century Hijam Irabot was the pioneer of nationalism in Manipur who firstly revolted against monarchy rule demanding a democratic government for the people. Various demands ranging from self determination to liberation of Manipur all took its root from not accepting the instrument of Merger act with the Indian Union. Scholar Paula Banerjee states that Merger agreement was seen by Manipuris as an "illegal and illegitimate annexation". Meitei and Pangal nationalists began claiming Manipur was a sovereign state in 1949 with democratic rule under 'Manipur State Constitution Act 1947' and Maharaja of Manipur Bodhchandra Singh was in no position to sign the merger agreement.

== See also ==
- Paona Brajabasi
- Chinglen Sana
- Wangkhei Meiraba
