= Directorate of Language Planning and Implementation =

Directorate of the Government of Manipur

- Directorate of Language Planning and Implementation, Government of Manipur

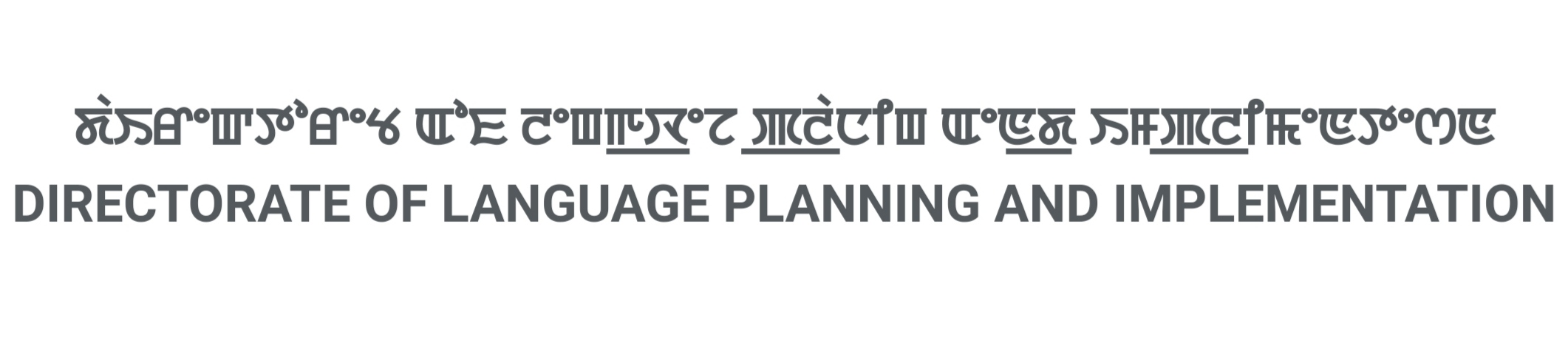

- Location within Manipur Location within India
- Abbreviation: DLPI
- Nickname: Department of Language Planning and Implementation
- Established: 4 September 2013; 13 years ago
- Founder: Government of Manipur
- Founded at: Imphal
- Type: Governmental
- Purpose: Language planning and implementation of language policy
- Headquarters: Imphal
- Location: Imphal, India
- Coordinates: 24.8150°N 93.9286°E
- Origins: Manipur
- Region served: Northeast India
- Fields: Language policy; Language planning; Language education; Language revitalization; Language reform; and others
- Official language: Meitei language (Manipuri)
- Owner: Government of Manipur
- Board of directors: Th. Chitra (as of 2021); Dr. Laishram Mahabir (21-12-2016 to 30-04- 2020); Kh. Raghumani (04-09-2013 to 21-12-2016)
- Parent organization: Government of Manipur
- Affiliations: Government of Manipur
- Funding: Government of India; Ministry of Culture (India); Government of Manipur
- Website: dlpi.mn.gov.in

Directorate of Language Planning and Implementation (DLPI) is a directorate of the Government of Manipur, India in charge of the language planning and the implementation of language policy.

The first anniversary of the Directorate of Language Planning and Implementation coincided with 18th Manipuri Language Day, the annual commemorative celebration of the Meitei language's inclusion in the Eighth Schedule to the Indian Constitution. The directorate has become a key organiser of the annual event.

== Language planning and implementation works ==
During November 2013, in collaboration with the Central Institute of Indian Languages (CIIL), MHRD, Government of India, Mysore, the Department of Language Planning and Implementation organised a five-day training programme on Natural Language Processing (NLP) in relation to Meitei language in Lamphelpat. The event took up the initiatives for the provision of the very essential boost for Meitei language and for "building of co-opera" in the Linguistic Data Consortium of Indian Languages (LDCIL). Major significant tasks discussed and highlighted during the event were machine translation for Meitei language documents; Optical Character Recognition (OCR) for Meitei language spell checker, transcription (and transliteration) of Bengali script into Meitei script (Meitei: Meitei Mayek) and vice versa. The event's main objective was to set up "building of co-opera" containing millions of Meitei language words, phrases, word meanings, words' spelling checker in computers. Experts and scholars of socio-linguistic groups working on Meitei literature, including the Manipuri Sahitya Parishad (MSP), Culture Forum Manipur, KALAM, MEELAL, etc. also participated in the event. The training program event was the first step in forwarding the development of Meitei language by the Directorate of Language Planning and Implementation.

During May 2014, the Directorate of Language Planning and Implementation organised a 10-day workshop with the purpose of developing Meitei-language terminology to replace English in the areas of Physics, Economics and Geography. Experts, including professors of various departments of different universities, took part.

During September 2014, the Directorate of Language Planning and Implementation organised another 10-day workshop., with the aim of producing translations of books on various subjects for secondary school students.

During March 2016, the DLPI held a symposium on the theme of Multiculturalism and Aspects of Translation. The symposium had two sessions. In one session, various resource persons presented papers on different topics for the promotion of Meitei language. In another session, resource persons presented research papers to sharply increase the level of the translation works to impart the knowledge and understanding of Meitei language to people living outside the state of Manipur.

During June 2017, the Directorate of Language Planning and Implementation organised a 10-day Meetei Mayek orientation programme for college teachers who teach Meitei language as a subject. The venue for the event was at the DM College of Arts, Imphal. In the event, Thokchom Radheshyam Singh, the then Education, Labour & Employment Minister, launched Meitei language textbooks (in Meitei Mayek) for the academic degree in Bachelor of Arts on e-book formats.

During April 2018, the Directorate of Language Planning & Implementation organised a three-day conference on the topic "Classical Language Status in respect of Manipuri Language" at the conference hall of Manipur State Guest House, Sanjenthong, Imphal. Langpoklakpam Jayantakumar Singh, the then Minister of Art & Culture Department of the Government of Manipur, as a Chief Guest of the event, assured that he will take a leading role in the efforts of attaining classical language status for Meitei language for the sake of future generations. Thokchom Radheshyam Singh, the then minister of the Education Department of the Government of Manipur, as a President of the event, while calling upon the people to involve in the movement for inclusion of Meitei language in the classical language list.

== Issues and Demands ==
=== November 2020 ===
During November 2020, in response to the then education minister's statement of introducing Sanskrit as a subject in selected schools and colleges of Manipur, there were strong criticism of the minister's plan from the sides of various social organizations. A spearheading social organization, "MEELAL" (Meetei Erol Eyek Loinasillol Apunba Lup) demanded the Government of Manipur that there should be state language departments other than Directorate of Language Planning and Implementation (DLPI) and the concerned authorities should first work on the development and the promotion of Manipur's indigenous languages and Meetei Mayek writing system before promoting other languages.

=== January 2022 ===
During January 2022, in a meeting with the Wakhallon Mannaba Apunba (WAMA), Leishemba Sanajaoba expressed that he was extremely unsatisfied with the negligence of the Department of Language Planning and Implementation in the documentation works for inclusion of Meitei language among the classical languages. The WAMA expressed that such negligence of the Language Department will make the efforts of Sanajaoba, of raising his voice in the Rajya Sabha, useless. The WAMA demanded the Government of Manipur for the change of the present director of Department of Language Planning and Implementation. According to the WAMA, Chitra, the present director, is unfit to hold the directorial position because of her neglecting and irresponsible behaviours.

== See also ==
- State Level Committee for declaration of Manipuri Language as Classical Language of India
