= Classical languages of India =

The Indian classical languages are the languages of India perceived as having high antiquity, and valuable, original and distinct literary heritage. Some classical languages of India are recognised by the Ministry of Culture of the Union Government of India, while some are separately recognised by the National Education Policy, specifically the 2020 edition, which is often referred to as the "New Education Policy". Certain classical languages are cited in the academic and scholarly writings and publications, independent of any governmental or institutional recognition.

The Government of India declared in 2004 that languages meeting strict criteria could be accorded the status of a classical language of India. It was instituted by the Ministry of Culture along with the Linguistic Experts' Committee. The committee was constituted by the Government of India to consider demands for the categorisation of languages as classical languages. In 2004, Tamil became the first language to be recognised. As of 2024, 11 languages have been recognised: the four largest Dravidian languages (Kannada, Malayalam, Tamil, Telugu), four Indo-Aryan languages that are still spoken (Assamese, Bengali, Marathi, Odia), and three historic Indo-Aryan languages (Sanskrit, Pali, Prakrit).

== Criteria ==
In the year 2004, the tentative criteria for the age of antiquity of "classical language" was assumed to be at least 1000 years of existence.

The Central Government has revised the criteria 3 times.

=== Criteria in 2004 ===
The following criteria were set during the time Tamil was given the classical language status by the government of India:

- High Antiquity of its early texts/ recorded history over a thousand years.
- A body of ancient literature/ texts, which is considered a valuable heritage by generation of speakers.
- The literary tradition must be original and not borrowed from another speech community.

=== Criteria in 2005 ===
The following criteria were set during the time Sanskrit was given the classical language status by the government of India

- High antiquity of its early texts/recorded history over a period of 1500–2000 years.
- body of ancient literature/texts, which is considered a valuable heritage by generations of speakers.
- The literary tradition be original and not borrowed from another speech community.
- The classical language and literature being distinct from modern, there may also be a discontinuity between the classical language and its later forms or its offshoots.

After classical language status was granted to Tamil in 2004, there were similar demands for other languages. Subsequently Telugu (2008), Kannada (2008), Malayalam (2013) and Odia (2014) were given the status.

=== Criteria in 2024 ===
The following criteria were set by the Ministry of Culture:

i. High antiquity of its early texts/recorded history over a period of 1500–2000 years.

ii. A body of ancient literature/texts, which is considered a heritage by generations of speakers.

iii. Knowledge texts, especially prose texts in addition to poetry, epigraphical and inscriptional evidence.

iv. The Classical Languages and literature could be distinct from its current form or could be discontinuous with later forms of its offshoots.

Assamese, Bengali, Marathi, Pali and Prakrit were given the classical language status in October 2024.

Upon dropping the criteria for "original literary tradition", the Linguistic Expert Committee justified their decision by stating the following:

“We discussed it in detail and understood that it was a very difficult thing to prove or disprove as all ancient languages borrowed from each other, but recreated the texts in their own way. On the contrary, archaeological, historical and numismatic evidence are tangible things”

— Linguistic Expert Committee

== Benefits ==
=== Academic opportunities ===
As per Government of India's Resolution No. 2-16/2004-US (Akademies) dated 1 November 2004, the benefits that will accrue to a language declared as a "Classical Language" are:

1. Two major international awards for scholars of eminence in Classical Indian Languages are awarded annually.
2. A Centre of Excellence for Studies in Classical Languages is set up.
3. The University Grants Commission will be requested to create, to start with at least in the Central Universities, a certain number of Professional Chairs for Classical Languages for scholars of eminence in Classical Indian Languages.

=== Job employment opportunities ===
The recognition of these classical languages will give job employment opportunities, especially in academic and research areas. Moreover, the preservation, documentation, and digitisation of ancient texts of these languages will provide employment opportunities to people in archiving, translation, publishing, and digital media.

== Recognition by the Ministry of Culture ==
| Language | Earliest attestation | | Language family | Language branch | Date recognised | |
| Language | Word/Place name | Epigraphy/Unbroken literary | Language family | Language branch | Date recognised | |
|---|---|---|---|---|---|---|
| Tamil | Word/Place name | 580 BCE | ~300 BCE (written) | Dravidian | South Dravidian | 12 October 2004 |
| Sanskrit | ~1500 BCE (oral) | ~1500 BCE (oral); 100 CE (written) (Note: Originally orally transmitted. Not attested in writing until the 1st century BCE, when it was written in the Brahmi script, and later in various Brahmic scripts.) | Indo-European | Indo-Aryan | 25 November 2005 | |
| Kannada | c. 250 BCE | 450 CE (written) | Dravidian | South Dravidian | 31 October 2008 | |
| Telugu | 200 BCE. | 575 CE (written) | Dravidian | South-Central Dravidian | 31 October 2008 | |
| Malayalam | 300-400 | 849 (written) CE | Dravidian | South Dravidian | 23 May 2013 | |
| Odia | | 700-800 CE (Note: c. 8th and 12th centuries CE through the Vajrayana Buddhist mystical composition of the Charyapada, which is regarded as the earliest known "common" written specimen of Bengali, Odia, and Assamese languages) | Indo-European | Eastern Indo-Aryan | 20 February 2014 | |
| Assamese | | 700-800 CE | Indo-European | Eastern Indo-Aryan | 3 October 2024 | |
| Bengali | 432-33 CE | 700-800 CE | Indo-European | Eastern Indo-Aryan | 3 October 2024 | |
| Marathi | | 739 CE | Indo-European | Southern Indo-Aryan | 3 October 2024 | |
| Pali | 260 BCE (written) | Between ~300-200 BCE (oral) and 100 BCE (Written) | Indo-European | Middle Indo-Aryan | 3 October 2024 | |
| Prakrit | | 260 BCE (written) | Indo-European | Middle Indo-Aryan | 3 October 2024 | |

== Recognition by the Education Policy ==
The New Education Policy, (Note: Certain sources mention it as "New Education Policy" with all letters capitalized, instead of directly mentioning the National Education Policy 2020.) also known as the National Education Policy 2020, had given recognition of Farsi (Persian language), owing to its huge long-established cultural heritage and influence on the traditional Indian culture, despite being originated from outside India, (Note: The establishment of Persian language in India coincided with or preceded the rise of certain native Indo-Aryan languages (from their regional Prakrit ancestors), which are recognised as "classical" in modern times.) simultaneously with two ancient Indian languages, namely, Prakrit and Pali, (Note: Prakrit and Pali were again given "classical language" recognition by the Ministry of Culture (India) later in 2024.) as "classical language of India". Certain sources explicitly mention it as "Classical languages of India", while some sources write only "Classical language", without highlighting it as either "Indian" or not. In 2024, the classical language designation was internationally announced by S. Jaishankar, the then External Affairs Minister of India, in a Tehran-based bilateral meeting between India and Iran.

| Language(s) | Earliest establishment | Language family | Language branch | Date recognised |
|---|---|---|---|---|
| Farsi/Persian language | Already long-established in Iran (Ancient Persia) in antiquity, but significantly introduced to the Indian subcontinent, in the 7th century CE by the Parsis. It was widespreadly introduced in the 11th century, during the invasion of Mahmud of Ghazni (conquering portions of Northwest India, including the Punjab, as a part of the Ghaznavid Empire) and the early Delhi Sultanate era | Indo-European | Iranian | January 2024 |
| Pali | c. 1st century BCE | Indo-European | Indo-Aryan | January 2024 |
| Prakrit | c. 3rd century BCE | Indo-European | Indo-Aryan | January 2024 |

== Demand from other languages ==
Some languages are described as "classical" by scholars but still not officially recognised as "classical" by the Government of India. These languages may either have administrative "official language" or "scheduled language" statuses.

=== Meitei ===
Meitei, or Manipuri, is a language of the Sino-Tibetan linguistic family, having a long literary tradition.

=== Maithili ===
Maithili is an Eastern Indo-Aryan language with a literary tradition that traces its roots back to the 7th and 8th centuries. The earliest known example of Maithili can be found in the Mandar Hill Sen inscription from the 7th century, which provides evidence of its ancient lineage. Additionally, the Charyapada, a collection of Buddhist mystical songs from the 8th century, also reflects the early development of Maithili. The language is predominantly spoken in the Mithila region, encompassing parts of present-day Bihar, Jharkhand and Nepal. Maithili's rich literary heritage includes epic poetry, philosophical texts, and devotional songs, such as the works of the 14th-century poet Vidyapati. Though it has a distinct script, Tirhuta, Devanagari is commonly used today. Despite its profound historical and cultural significance, Maithili has yet to be recognised as a "classical language" by the Government of India, leading to ongoing demands for such recognition.

== Classical Language Literary Awards ==
In January 2026, the Government of Tamil Nadu announced the first edition of the annual "Semmozhi Illakiya Virudhu" (transl. Classical Language Literary Award), for the best works in the 7 languages, namely Tamil, Telugu, Kannada, Malayalam, Odiya, Bengali and Marathi, carrying a cash prize of 7 lakh INR each.

== Politics ==
Besides the literary achievements, the status of classical language is granted, sometimes influenced by the political parties of the states or union territories of the respective languages where these are spoken or are based in, or the national parties, advocating for the certain languages to be accorded the demanded status.

| Languages declared as "classical" | Political parties (involved in advocacy) | State/UT/National level parties | Notes/Ref. |
|---|---|---|---|
| Tamil | Dravida Munnetra Kazhagam and UPA Government | Tamil Nadu and national | |
| Telugu | Telugu Desam Party and UPA Government | United Andhra and National | |
| Kannada | Bharatiya Janata Party and UPA Government | Karnataka and national | |
| Odia | UPA Government and Biju Janata Dal | National and Odisha | |
| Bengali | Trinamool Congress and Bharatiya Janata Party | West Bengal and national | |
| Bengali | Amra Bangali | Tripura | |
| Marathi | Maharashtra Navnirman Sena, Shiv Sena | Maharashtra | |
| Marathi | Bharatiya Janata Party, Indian National Congress | National | |

== Court cases against classical status ==
A lawyer from the Madras High Court legally challenged against the official classical status of Malayalam and Odia, in 2015. There was a long legal proceeding for almost one year. Later, the Madras High Court disposed the case against the mentioned languages' status of being officially "classical" in 2016.

== See also ==
- Indian classical dance
- Indian classical music
- State Level Committee for declaration of Manipuri Language as Classical Language of India
- Linguistic history of India

== Sources ==
- Zvelebil, Kamil (1992), Companion studies to the history of Tamil literature, Leiden: Brill, ISBN 978-90-04-09365-2
- Christian Lee Novetzke (2016). The Quotidian Revolution: Vernacularization, Religion, and the Premodern Public Sphere in India. Columbia University Press. ISBN 978-0-231-54241-8.
- Suniti Kumar Chatterji (1926). Origin And Development Of The Bengali Language Pt.1. Kolkata: Calcutta University Press.
