= Official script =

Designated writing system of a jurisdiction

The letters of the Indic official scripts of the Indian Republic used by the official languages of India – (top row: Tamil, Malayalam, Odia, Gujarati, Meitei bottom row:Bengali/Assamese, Kannada/Telugu, Ol Chiki, Devanagari, Gurmukhi), Urdu alphabet These are the examples of the official scripts.

An official script is a writing system that is specifically designated to be official in the constitutions or other applicable laws of countries, states, and other jurisdictions. Akin to an official language, an official script is much rarer. It is used primarily where an official language is in practice written with two or more scripts. As, in these languages, use of script often has cultural or political connotations, proclamation of an official script is sometimes criticized as having a goal of influencing culture or politics or both. Desired effects also may include easing education, communication and some other aspects of life.

== List of official scripts ==
Below is a partial list of official scripts used in different countries. Those in italics are states that have limited international recognition.

This list does not cover local variations of international scripts, such as which diacritics are used.

- Armenia – Armenian alphabet
- Bolivia – Latin script
- Bosnia and Herzegovina:
  - Republika Srpska – Cyrillic and Latin
  - Federation of Bosnia and Herzegovina – Cyrillic and Latin
- Bulgaria – Cyrillic (Bulgarian alphabet)
- Cambodia – Khmer script
- China, People's Republic of (mainland China) – Simplified Chinese
  - Hong Kong SAR – Traditional Chinese (de facto), Latin script
  - Macau SAR – Traditional Chinese (de facto), Latin script
  - Inner Mongolia region – Mongolian alphabet, Simplified Chinese
  - Tibet region – Tibetan alphabet, Simplified Chinese
  - Xinjiang region – Uyghur Ereb Yéziqi, Simplified Chinese
  - Guangxi region – Zhuang Latin alphabet, Simplified Chinese
- Croatia – Croatian alphabet
- Ethiopia – Ge'ez script
- Eritrea – Ge'ez script
- Georgia – Georgian alphabet
- Greece – Greek alphabet
- Hungary – Latin script
- India:
  - Hindi, Marathi, Konkani, Nepali, Maithili, Boro, Sanskrit, Dogri – Devanagari
  - Assamese – Assamese alphabet
  - Bengali – Bengali alphabet
  - Gujarati – Gujarati script
  - Kannada – Kannada script
  - Kashmiri – Perso-Arabic script
  - Malayalam – Malayalam script
  - Meitei – Meitei script
  - Odia – Odia script
  - Punjabi – Gurmukhi
  - Santali – Ol Chiki script
  - Sindhi – Perso-Arabic script, Devanagari
  - Tamil – Tamil script
  - Telugu – Telugu script
  - Urdu – Urdu alphabet
- Islamic world:
  - Afghanistan – Perso-Arabic
  - Algeria – Arabic and Tifinagh
  - Azerbaijan – Azeri Latin alphabet
  - Bahrain – Arabic
  - Bangladesh – Bengali alphabet
  - Brunei – Rumi script (Latin) and Jawi script (Arabic)
  - Egypt – Arabic
  - Indonesia – Rumi script (Latin)
  - Iran – Perso-Arabic
  - Iraq – Arabic
  - Jordan – Arabic
  - Kazakhstan – Cyrillic (Kazakh, Russian) and Latin (Kazakh)
  - Kuwait – Arabic
  - Lebanon – Arabic
  - Libya – Arabic
  - Malaysia – Rumi script (Latin); Jawi script (Arabic) is recognized.
  - Maldives – Thaana
  - Oman – Arabic
  - Palestine – Arabic
  - Qatar – Arabic
  - Saudi Arabia – Arabic
  - Tunisia – Arabic
  - Turkey – Latin alphabet
  - United Arab Emirates – Arabic
  - Yemen – Arabic
- Italy:
  - Venetian (Official script of the Venetian language)
- Japan – a combination of Kana (Hiragana, Katakana) and Kanji (Shinjitai)
- Korea (both) – Chosŏn'gŭl/Hangul (Hanja is sometime used in South Korea, not used in North Korea)
- Laos – Lao script
- Malta – Latin script
- Moldova – Latin alphabet
- Mongolia – Mongolian Cyrillic alphabet and Mongolian script
- Montenegro – Cyrillic (Montenegrin alphabet)
- Myanmar – Burmese alphabet
- Nepal
  - Nepali language — Devanagari
  - Nepal Bhasa — Ranjana script
  - Maithili — Tirhuta script and Kaithi
  - Bhojpuri language — Kaithi and Devanagari
  - Tharu — Devanagari
  - Tamang — Tamyig, Devanagari and Tibetan script
  - Bajjika — Tirhuta script, Kaithi and Devanagari
  - Limbu — Limbu script
  - Bantawa — Kirat Rai script and Devanagari
  - Gurung — Khema script, Devanagari and Tibetan script
  - Awadhi — Kaithi, Perso-Arabic script, Devanagari and Latin script
  - Urdu — Urdu alphabet, Roman Urdu and Urdu Braille
- North Macedonia – Cyrillic (Macedonian alphabet)
- Philippines – Latin alphabet (de facto)
- Russian Federation – Cyrillic (Russian alphabet)
- Serbia – Cyrillic (Serbian alphabet)
- Singapore
  - English, Malay — Latin script
  - Mandarin – Simplified Chinese
  - Tamil – Tamil script
- Slovakia – Latin script
- Taiwan – Traditional Chinese
- Thailand – Thai script
- Ukraine – Cyrillic (Ukrainian alphabet)
- United Kingdom – Latin script
- Vietnam – Latin script (de facto)

== Historical ==
- In the USSR, numerous languages were latinized during the 1920s–1930s. In the late 1930s the Latinization campaign was canceled and all newly romanized languages were converted to Cyrillic.

== See also ==
- Official language
- Spelling reform
