= Manipuri Sahitya Parishad =

Literary club for the Meitei language

- Meitei: ꯃꯅꯤꯄꯨꯔꯤ ꯁꯥꯍꯤꯇ꯭ꯌ ꯄꯔꯤꯁꯗ
- Logo of the Manipuri Sahitya Parishad
- Abbreviation: MSP
- Formation: 1935; 91 years ago
- Founded at: Imphal
- Type: Nonprofit, NGO, etc.
- Legal status: active
- Headquarters: Imphal
- Locations: Imphal, India; Thoubal, Jiribam, Assam, Tripura
- Origins: Manipur
- Region served: Northeast India
- Fields: Meitei literature and Meitei culture
- Official language: Meitei (Manipuri)
- Funding: Government of Manipur

The Manipuri Sahitya Parishad (Meitei: ꯃꯅꯤꯄꯨꯔꯤ ꯁꯥꯍꯤꯇ꯭ꯌ ꯄꯔꯤꯁꯗ, lit. 'Manipuri Literary Council') is a literary council dedicated to the active promotion and the development of literary works in the Meitei language in India. in national as well as international levels. It has its branches in the Manupur cities of Imphal, Jiribam, Bishnupur and Thoubal inside Manipur and in Tripura and Meghalaya in Assam.

The Manipuri Sahitya Parishad organises research works, seminars, symposiums, publication of journals and books, translation works of Meitei-language literary works into other languages, preservation of Meitei folktales and Meitei music, bestowing of literary awards and cash prizes to outstanding writers and artists.

== HSLC in Assam ==
In 1977, E. Chandra, the then president of the Manipuri Sahitya Parishad, Assam and D. Gogoi, the then President, SEBA, and the Government of Assam came into an agreement, and the Meitei language medium of the HSLC examination was introduced. In the year 1979, for the first time in the history, 1,043 Meitei students in the Barak Valley, from 26 high schools, got the opportunity to appear at the H.S.L.C. examination in Meitei language medium.

== Kamini Kumar Memorial Gold Medal ==
Kamini Kumar was the patron of Manipuri Sahitya Parishad, Tripura since its establishment in the year 1963. He donated ₹1,000 (equivalent to ₹91,000 or US$940 in 2026) to the Manipuri Sahitya Parishad, Imphal, through which the Sahitya Parishad managed to bestow the prestigious "Kamini Kumar Memorial Gold Medal", a 3 yearly award for the best creative-writing in Meitei language, written by Manipuris of outside of Manipur.

On 24 June 2019, Abdul Hamid, a Meitei Pangal of Cachar, Assam, was bestowed the prestigious "Kamini Kumar Gold Medal Award" in the 84th Annual General Meeting of the "Manipuri Sahitya Parishad, Imphal", at the Jawaharlal Nehru Dance Academy in Imphal.

== Contributions to fields other than the literature ==
Other than the field of Meitei literature, the Manipuri Sahitya Parishad also promotes the people who contribute to the fields of Matam Ishei, Nat Sankritan, Raas, stage drama, Goura Leela, paintings, Thang-Ta, Lairik Thiba, Pung, among the elements of Meitei culture, by conferring awards every year.

Promoting the Meitei classical dance and the Meitei Sankirtana, the Manipuri Sahitya Parishad, Imphal, bestowed the title of 'Sangeet Ratna' to Chengtham Subal and Haobam Basna, in 1976 and 1984 respectively.

== Published works ==
- 1964 Archaic Manipuri literature (in Manipuri). Jour. of Manipuri Sahitya Parishad, March: 1–13.
- Singh, Moirangthem Chandra: 1967: Panthoibi Khonggul (in Manipuri). Imphal, Manipuri Sahitya Parishad.
- 1967 Charairongba Khugum (in Manipuri) Imphal, Manipuri Sahitya Parishad.
- Parrett, J. K.: 1973: Manipur and European Research. The Sahitya (Imphal), Manipur Sahitya Parishad, August issue.
- 1967: The origin of the Meitei race (in Manipuri), Jour. of the Manipuri Sahitya Parishad : 11–7.

== Key people ==
- Ningthoukhongjam Chandrahas Singh (1904–1966) was the first president of the Manipuri Sahitya Parishad, Tripura. He participated in the annual conference of the Parishad in Imphal as a delegate from Tripura in 1964. Besides, he was the first Manipuri of Tripura, who became a session judge.
- A. K. Seram, the Founder and the President of Bangladesh Manipuri Sahitya Sangsad, attended a number of literary seminars, organised by Manipuri Sahitya Parishad, Assam in India.
- Karam Ibungohal was the general secretary of the Manipuri Sahitya Parishad, Assam and editor of the annual journal of the Parishad.
- Kheiruddin Chowdhury was the President of the Manipuri Sahitya Parishad, Assam. Manipuri Sahitya Parishad, Imphal bestowed him the prestigious Kamini Kumar award in 1978. He advocated on many Meitei language movements (Manipuri language movements), specifically in the Cachar district of Assam.
- Rajkumar Kamaljit (born 1924) was the President of the Manipuri Sahitya Parishad, Tripura and founder-editor of Manipuri Journal named "Marup".
- Mayengbam Ramgopal was the secretary of Manipuri Sahitya Parishad, Tripura, the chief editor of "Takhel Leirang", a magazine of Manipuri Sahitya Parishad, Tripura.
- R. K. Jitendrajit was a Secretary of the Manipuri Sahitya Parishad, Tripura.
- Wangkhem Biramangal was closely associated with Manipuri Sahitya Parishad, Tripura, Tripura Rabindra Parishad and other philanthropic organisations in Tripura, and is actively engaged in the promotion of Manipurology.

== See also ==
- Directorate of Language Planning and Implementation
- Sahitya Akademi
  - List of Sahitya Akademi Award winners for Meitei
  - List of Sahitya Akademi Translation Prize winners for Meitei
  - List of Yuva Puraskar winners for Meitei
- Manipur University
- Manipur University of Culture
