= Modern Meitei theatre =

Meitei drama of 20th century and afterwards

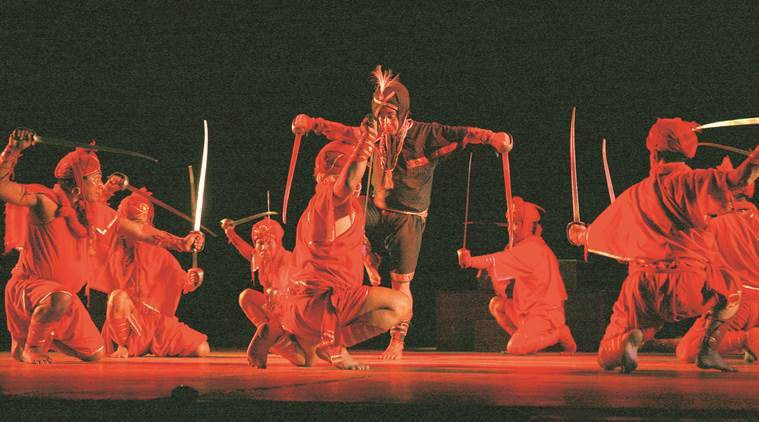
"Ratan Thiyam The Man of Theater", a stage performance

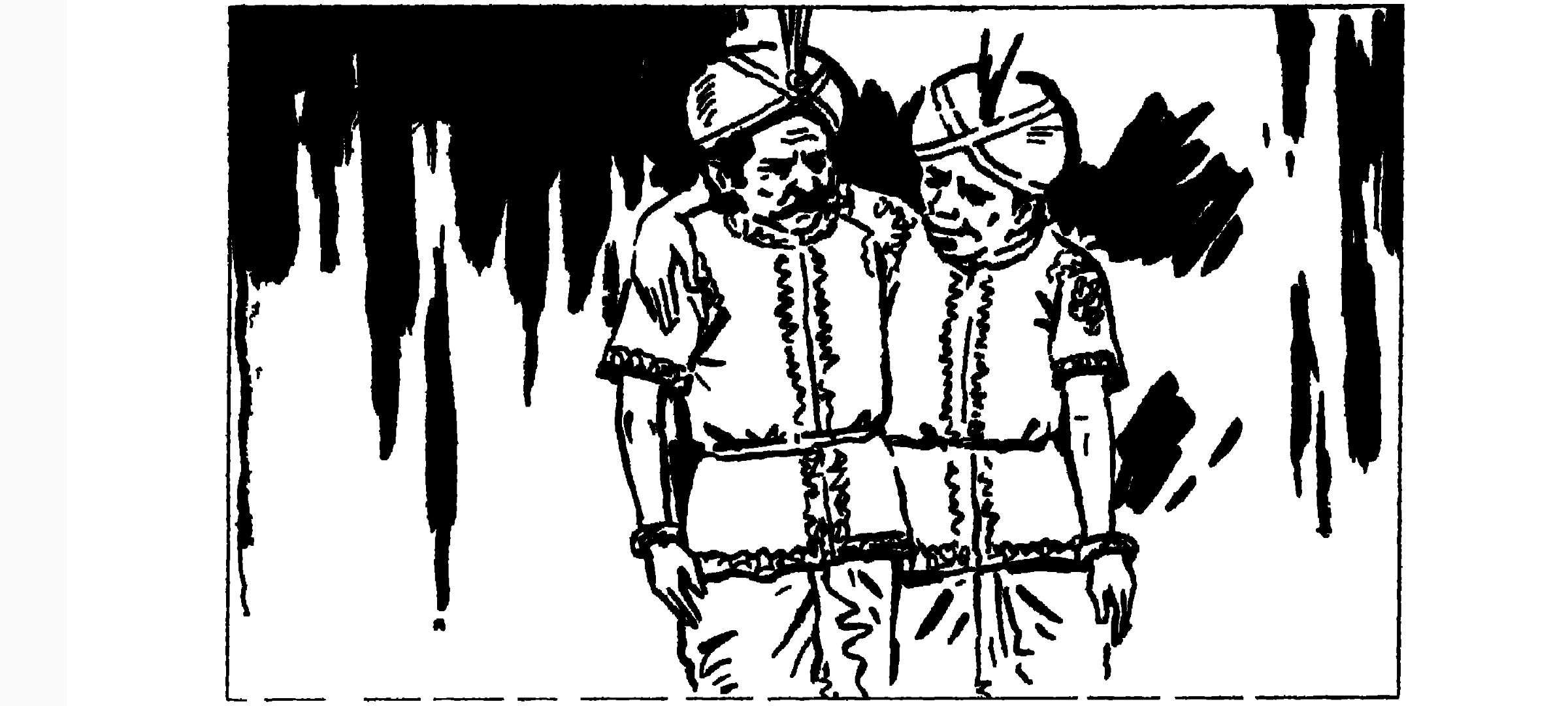
An illustration of a classical Meitei theatrical performance of the play "Bhagyachandrana Tekhao Shamu Phaaba" in Borobekra village of Jiribam, Kangleipak (Manipur)

Modern Meitei drama refers to the body of theatrical works produced in Manipur, primarily in the Meitei language (also known as Manipuri language), before and after the World War II periods. It marks a transition from traditional mythological and religious themes to subjects rooted in contemporary social, political, and cultural issues. The development of this genre was shaped by the impact of war, the rise of print culture, and exposure to modern education, which collectively influenced playwrights to explore new narrative forms and character-driven conflicts. The period saw the emergence of playwrights who integrated indigenous literary forms with modern dramaturgical techniques, contributing to the formation of a distinct modern theatrical tradition in Manipur.

Before World War II, modern Meitei drama in Manipur grew from Bengali influences to develop its own style. Plays became more socially aware and locally rooted over time. Theatres were basic, but actors and playwrights worked with passion. The formation of dramatic unions and the production of original Meitei plays marked a cultural turning point. Despite many plays being lost, the period laid the foundation for modern Meitei theatre.

== Before World War II ==
Before World War II, the novel quietly entered Meitei literature, but drama made a louder arrival, as it was performed on stage and quickly attracted attention. The Meitei people, who were already skilled in dance, music, and jatra (a traditional form of drama), embraced theatre easily. With help from Bengali officers living in Manipur and Meitei teachers from Assam, drama became popular among the locals.

Early on, Bengali-style theatre was introduced to Manipur. Though simple, it impressed people. These performances mostly featured Bengali plays about epics and historical stories and were staged during festivals like Durga Puja. Since women couldn't perform on stage due to social rules, boys played female roles until the 1920s.

In 1905, local artists translated a Bengali play, Pagalini, into Manipuri, but it still used a lot of Bengali words. A major breakthrough came in 1918, when Parthaparajay was fully translated into pure Manipuri. From then, more Bengali plays were adapted and performed across towns and villages.

The first full-length Manipuri play, Nara Singh, was written in 1925 by Lairenmayum Ibungohal Singh at the request of the king, Maharaja Churachand Singh. It was performed with great fanfare in the royal palace and featured traditional costumes, real weapons, and dramatic battle scenes. The play was important more for its patriotic message and stage effects than for its story or characters.

=== Features of theatre ===
Theatres were basic. The main one, Bandhavnatyasala, had a thatched roof at first, later upgraded to tin. The stage was wooden, and sets were simple – painted cloths, real plants, and a few background scenes reused for different settings. Props like thrones and chariots were carefully made, but lighting came from kerosene lamps.

Costumes were fancy but fixed – actors didn't change outfits even when the story called for it. Make-up was homemade using vermilion, soot, and powder. Mustaches were made from dyed jute. Actors from outside the state often spoke in a high pitch, which became a trend. Loud dialogue and foot-stomping were seen as signs of good acting.

Actors never turned their backs to the audience; they always entered and exited sideways. Seating was separated by gender – women in the balcony or special areas, men elsewhere, and kids sat on mats.

In 1928, a new play Sati Khongnang (about the practice of sati) marked a shift away from Bengali-influenced styles, leading to a more local form of theatre. This success led to the founding of the Meitei Dramatic Union (later Manipur Dramatic Union) in 1930. More groups and local playwrights began writing plays, though many of their works were lost or unpublished.

=== Major Plays and Writers ===
==== Nara Singh (1925) ====
Nara Singh (ꯅꯔ ꯁꯤꯡꯍ, 1925) is important for its national pride and production scale, but not so strong in storytelling or characters compared to the other poems. Still, it lives on in people's memory.

==== Areppa Marup (1931) by Lalit Singh ====
Areppa Marup (ꯑꯔꯦꯞꯄ ꯃꯔꯨꯞ, 1931) tells the story of Chandra Singh, a spoiled son who goes astray, commits crimes, and dies in regret. He contrasts with his honest friend Pratap. The play was praised for showing real social problems.

==== Ibemma (1936) and Poktabi (1939) by Angahal ====
Ibemma (ꯏꯕꯦꯝꯃ) tells the story of a husband who leaves his wife for another woman. Ibemma remains loyal, but dies at the end.

Poktabi (ꯄꯣꯛꯇꯕꯤ) focuses on a woman forced to marry someone else, but she resists. Eventually, justice is served, but she refuses to return to her first husband out of dignity. Angahal's plays show flashes of good writing but are seen as weaker than his novels and poems.

==== Devajani by Kamal ====
Devajani (ꯗꯦꯕꯖꯥꯅꯤ) is about a protest against caste discrimination. A Kshatriya man loves a Brahman girl, which was considered taboo. The play challenges unfair traditions but remains unfinished and was never staged.

==== Moirang Thoibi (1937) and Bhagyachandra (1939) by Dorendra ====
Moirang Thoibi (ꯃꯣꯏꯔꯥꯡ ꯊꯣꯏꯕꯤ, 1937) retells a popular legend but adds new twists. It uses Sanskrit terms and reflects Hindu themes.

Bhagyachandra (ꯚꯥꯒ꯭ꯌꯆꯟꯗ꯭ꯔ) starts as a political play but turns into a spiritual tale about a saintly king. It recalls a turbulent time in Manipur's history but lacks dramatic intensity.

== After World War II ==
Following World War II, Meitei theatre experienced significant transformation, reflecting the social and psychological changes in the region. The wartime hardships prompted the people to seek solace in the performing arts. Despite ongoing conflicts, dramatic performances persisted in rural and suburban areas. With the return of peace, there was a rapid proliferation of playhouses, supported by the surplus of wartime currency. These theatres moved beyond traditional mythological and moralistic narratives, embracing romantic, historical, and patriotic themes derived from Meitei ballads, legends, and folklore.

Early dramatists such as Haobam Tomba Singh (1908–1976) and Sarangthem Bormani Singh (b. 1928) were prominent figures in this phase. Their works, often set in the cultural milieu of Moirang, were written in archaic Meitei verse and featured folk elements such as traditional songs, costumes, and scenery. Plays like Tamna (ꯇꯥꯝꯅꯥ), Pidonnu (ꯄꯤꯗꯣꯟꯅꯨ), and Sajik Thaba (ꯁꯖꯤꯛ ꯊꯕꯥ) by Tomba, and Kege Lamja (ꯀꯦꯒꯦ ꯂꯝꯖꯥ) and Haorang Leisang Saphabi (ꯍꯥꯎꯔꯪ ꯂꯩꯁꯪ ꯁꯥꯐꯕꯤ) by Bormani gained popularity. Other playwrights such as M. Biramangol Singh and L. Netrajit Singh contributed with works like Henjunaha (ꯍꯦꯟꯖꯨꯅꯍꯥ) and Moirang Thoibi. These plays, which dominated until the mid-1950s, culminated in national recognition when Haorang Leisang Saphabi won a folk-play prize at the National Drama Festival in Delhi in 1954.

A subsequent phase introduced contemporary social themes, often exploring love, hardship, and societal tensions. Though these plays generally lacked literary depth, their emotional appeal and popular songs secured broad public support. Examples include Thaballei (ꯊꯥꯕꯜꯂꯩ), Roxy Theatre), Basanta-Bimola (ꯕꯁꯟꯇ ꯕꯤꯃꯣꯂꯥ, Rupmahal), and Thambal (ꯊꯝꯕꯥꯜ, Aryan Theatre).

The period also saw the emergence of patriotic and historical dramas. Works like Pamheiba (ꯄꯥꯝꯍꯩꯕ), Paona (ꯄꯥꯎꯅꯥ), and Tikendrajit (ꯇꯤꯀꯦꯟꯗ꯭ꯔꯖꯤꯠ) revived episodes of Manipuri history and local faith, often with an anti-colonial or revivalist outlook. M. Biramangol Singh's plays like Garibniwaj (ꯒꯔꯤꯕꯅꯤꯋꯥꯖ) and Sija Laiobi (ꯁꯤꯖ ꯂꯥꯏꯑꯣꯏꯕꯤ) addressed religious and cultural transitions, particularly the impact of Hinduism on indigenous Meitei practices.

A notable figure during this era was G.C. Tongbra (b. 1913), who introduced satirical social criticism into Meitei drama. His plays, often written in colloquial prose, examined family conflicts, educational pressures, bureaucratic dysfunction, and political decay. Notable works include Mani Mamou (ꯃꯅꯤ ꯃꯃꯧ, 1945), Matric Pass (ꯃꯦꯇ꯭ꯔꯤꯛ ꯄꯥꯁ, 1964), Hingminnaba (ꯍꯤꯡꯃꯤꯟꯅꯕ, 1961), Anee Thokna Chingkhaire Thamoi, Chengni Khujai (ꯑꯅꯤ ꯊꯣꯛꯅ ꯆꯤꯡꯈꯥꯏꯔꯦ ꯊꯃꯣꯏ, ꯆꯦꯡꯅꯤ ꯈꯨꯖꯥꯏ, 1972), and Tapta (ꯇꯞꯇꯥ, 1972). While sometimes veering into farce, his work broadened the thematic scope of Meitei drama.

Contemporary playwrights such as Maibam Ramcharan Singh (b. 1928) focused on domestic and familial issues, especially the experiences of women in conservative households. His works, such as Sarat-Purnima (ꯁꯔꯠ ꯄꯨꯔꯅꯤꯃꯥ, 1966) and Mapi-Mapa (ꯃꯄꯤ ꯃꯄꯥ, 1967), are characterized by melodrama and a strong emotional current, though they remain under-assessed in literary terms.

The 1960s marked a period of decline for Meitei theatre due to the rise of cinema and the perceived failure of dramatists to engage with new social realities such as post-war trauma, peasant unrest, and political change. The lack of realism and reliance on outdated romantic or heroic themes contributed to this downturn.

However, a new generation of writers emerged in response. Arambam Somorendra Singh (1935–2000), with a university background, infused realism and middle-class concerns into plays such as Judge Sahebki Eemung (ꯖꯗ꯭ꯖ ꯁꯥꯍꯦꯕꯀꯤ ꯏꯃꯨꯡ, 1968), Karbar (ꯀꯔꯕꯥꯔ, 1970), and Dasha (ꯗꯁꯥ, 1974). These works offered critique of materialism, hypocrisy, and bureaucratic corruption.

Athokpam Tomchou Singh (b. 1944) further explored themes of moral decline and corruption in works such as Promotion (1974), Jali Mee (ꯖꯥꯂꯤ ꯃꯤ, 1975), and Bus Stop (1975). His tone was more didactic, often lacking the character nuance of earlier dramatists.

Pukhrambam Samu Singh (1944–1980) addressed issues such as bigamy and the social status of performers in plays like Jagoi Sabi (ꯖꯒꯣꯏ ꯁꯥꯕꯤ, 1971) and Atonbi (ꯑꯇꯣꯟꯕꯤ, 1975), while H. Kanhailal (b. 1939), founder of Kalakshetra Manipur, brought experimental and avant-garde forms into local theatre. His works Taret Leima (ꯇꯔꯦꯠ ꯂꯩꯃ, 1967) and Tamna Lai (ꯇꯝꯅ ꯂꯥꯏ, 1975) drew from classical and Western dramatic traditions.

Later dramatists such as K. Dhiren (1947–1991), Y. Rajendra Singh (b. 1947), and Ksh. Sanajaoba (b. 1944) expanded on these directions, exploring political themes, environmental concerns, and symbolic representation. Sri Biren (b. 1946) experimented with absurdist forms in Khongchat (ꯈꯣꯡꯆꯠ), Hallakpa (ꯍꯜꯂꯛꯄ), and Anee (ꯑꯅꯤ).

Among the few female playwrights, M.K. Binodini Devi (b. 1922) stands out. Her works Asangba Nongjabi (ꯑꯁꯪꯕ ꯅꯣꯡꯖꯥꯕꯤ, 1967) and Olangthagi Wangmadasu (ꯑꯣꯂꯥꯡꯊꯥꯒꯤ ꯋꯥꯡꯃꯗꯁꯨ, 1980) blend introspective romanticism with themes of tradition and generational conflict.

The growth of All India Radio's drama programming and the rise of theatre troupes across the state provided platforms for many emerging writers. Notable radio plays include Karnagi Mama amasung Karnagi Aroiba Yahip (ꯀꯔꯅꯒꯤ ꯃꯃꯥ ꯑꯃꯁꯨꯡ ꯀꯔꯅꯒꯤ ꯑꯔꯣꯏꯕ ꯌꯥꯍꯤꯞ, 1981) by N. Ibobi Singh and Anuradhapur Ashramgi Rajkumar (ꯑꯅꯨꯔꯥꯙꯥꯄꯨꯔ ꯑꯥꯁ꯭ꯔꯝꯒꯤ ꯔꯥꯖꯀꯨꯃꯥꯔ, 1983) by Moirangthem Inao.

While post-war Meitei drama underwent thematic and formal diversification, its continued vitality has depended on adapting to socio-political changes and exploring new forms of theatrical expression.

== See also ==
- Traditional Meitei theatre
- Modern Meitei poetry
- Meitei novel
- Manipur Dramatic Union
- Kalakshetra Manipur
- Ratan Thiyam
- Heisnam Kanhailal
- Sabitri Heisnam
- Lairembigee Eshei
- Yamata Amasung Keibu Keioiba
