= Shri Biren =

Writer of Meitei literature

Shri Biren (Shribiren)
- Meitei: Nongthombam Shri Biren / Meitei: Nongthombam Shribiren
- Shri Biren
- Died: 29 December 2011; Achom Leikai, Uripok
- Resting place: Achom Leikai, Uripok
- Citizenship: Indian
- Education: Gauhati University
- Occupations: editor, poet, playwright, social reformer, teacher and short story writer of works in Meitei literature
- Writing career
- Language: Meitei language (Manipuri language)
- Period: modern
- Genres: existentialism, iconoclasm, metaphysics, modernism, philosophy in Meitei literature
- Subject: Meitei literature
- Notable works: Tollaba Sha-dugee Wakhal; Masina Imphalgee Wareeni; Mapal Naidabasida Ei (Winner of the "Sahitya Akademi Award 1990"); Sanagee Keirak; Chatloiko Ei Mapham Kadaidasu (winner of "Manipur State Award for Literature 2011")
- Notable awards: the Manipur State Kala Academy Award, the Central Sahitya Akademi Award and the Jamini Sundar Gold Medal
- Movement: modernism in Meitei literature

Nongthombam Shri Biren, better known shortly as Shri Biren or Sri Biren, (Note: "Shri" or "Sri" used in this particular name is not a honorific but a part of his own given name, like that of "Sri Devi" aka "Sridevi".) and also spelled as Shribiren or Sribiren, was an Indian editor, poet, playwright, social reformer, teacher and short story writer of works in Meitei literature. His writings are characterised by the wrath and the mood of the loss of hope and confidence. He was active in writing in the 1960s and the 1970s. Most of his writings are predominant with the "iconoclastic extreme anger and questioning of everything in life". He was considered to be an angry young man of the 1970s, for his poem, Tangkhul Hui (Meitei for 'Tangkhul Dog'). He was known for portraying the lives of people in a metaphysical and philosophical way, protesting against the existing socio-political systems and institutions and attempting to break them, using symbolism and allegory as tools, as evident in "The Two Doors". He was bestowed with the Manipur State Kala Academy Award, the Central Sahitya Akademi Award and the Jamini Sundar Gold Medal for his poetry and short stories. Unfortunate to the Meitei literature is that he died at an early age, suffering from Parkinson's disease.

== Education ==
Nongthombam Sri Biren completed his graduation from the Gauhati University in 1965.

== Works ==
Throughout his lifetime, Shri Biren contributed 4 books of collection of poetry, 2 books of collection of short stories and one book of a collection of short plays, to Meitei literature. His poetry book "Sanagee Keirak" (Meitei: ꯁꯅꯥꯒꯤ ꯀꯩꯔꯥꯛ, lit. 'The Golden Ladder') contains 44 poems, written between 1989 and 1997.

=== Drama ===
Using drama as a tool for social critique, Sri Biren and his contemporaries, earnestly attempted to take up vast human tight spots to be shown in experimental performances, thereby to break up with the traditional trends in the drama forms of owing only regional themes as their backgrounds. However, since the 1980s, drama as literary works got declined in Meitei literature. The main reason for its scantily publications was that of the rise of regular stage-plays produced by the numerous theatre houses as well as other experimental associations, thereby providing the people (readers as well as viewers) diverse taste.

In the 1970s, adhering to existentialism, Sri Biren shows the "cry of hopelessness and loneliness" in his short plays, including but not limited to the Khongchat (Meitei for 'Journey').

With a dilemma of modernism, Shri Biren experimentally penned on the Meitei language dramas, getting widespread readership, and many of which were translated into English. He was one of the people who made modern Meitei dramas into a "strong literary force".

=== Poetry ===
The era of predominance of conventional or romantic poems in Meitei literature took a break as Sri Biren and his contemporary poets took up their pens. Sri Biren's collection of poems titled Tollaba Sadugi Wakhal (Meitei for '"The Lowly Creature's Musings"/"The thoughts of the poor animal"') was notable for raising voices of disillusionment, to free oneself from illusion.

Shri Biren is often called as "an angry young poet". His poems show that there is no future for mankind in the present situation of happenings. His distinct way of writing is a constant search of answers to different queries for which he himself gives no satisfactory replies. As his sobriquet suggested, he was very young during the peak of his poetic writings, and he was known for having his own poetic visions and expressions.

=== Short stories ===
In his short stories, Sri Biren expressed his sentiments in the same way as he did in his poems. He showed his fury over the inequalities in society and economy as well as in the downfall of the morality of people. His stories had imitations of the lines from his poems. He initiated diverse styles and modes of narrations in his writings experimentally. One of the most unique features of his work is that while narrating stories, he used to ask different questions by himself intermittently and all the answers to the questions were also given by himself. He was known for writing psychological stories with the intentions of creating shocks and provocations to the readers.

== Legacy ==
Shri Biren is considered to be one of the celebrated poets of Manipur in the 21st century. Many of his poetry were translated into Bengali language. Significantly, some of them were read out in public by Kulamani Singh as a part of the 2-Day celebrated Indo-Bangla International Poets Meet-2013.

== See also ==
- Angom Gopi
- Ashangbam Minaketan Singh
- Khwairakpam Chaoba
