= Modern Meitei (disambiguation) =

Modern Meitei (or Modern Manipuri) may also refer to:

- A person belonging to Meitei ethnicity, living in modern times
- Of or relating to Meitei culture in modern times
- Modern Meitei novel, a body of prosaic compositions in Modern Meithei language
- Modern Meitei poetry, a body of poetic compositions in Modern Meithei language, made from 19th century onwards till present times
- Modern Meitei theatre, a form of Meitei drama, contrasting to the classical or traditional Meitei theatrical performances
