= Heisnam =

Heisnam is a Meitei family name. Notable people with this surname are:

- Sabitri Heisnam, Indian stage actor
- Heisnam Kanhailal, Indian art theatre personality

== See also ==
- Heisnam Lairembi, a title of goddess Panthoibi as she is predominantly worshipped by the Heisnam family
