= Ashangbam Minaketan Singh =

Indian writer (1906–1995)

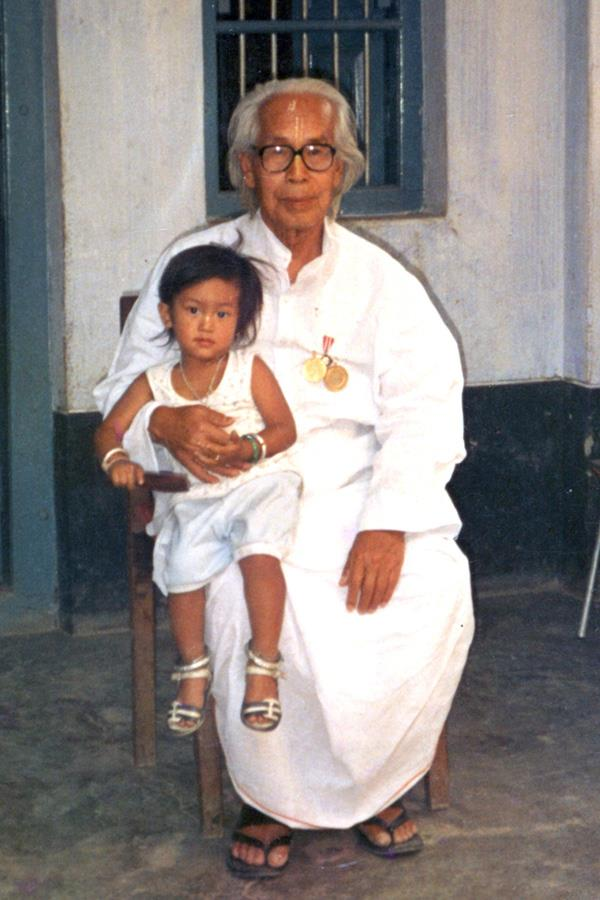
- Born: 2 May 1906; Wangkhei Ashangbam Leikai, Imphal, Manipur, India
- Died: 1995 (aged 88–89); Uripok Cheirap Panchay Maning, Imphal, Manipur
- Education: Bachelor of Arts, Master of Arts, PhD
- Alma mater: University of Calcutta
- Known for: Manipuri Literature
- Parents: Ashangbam Jivan Singh (father); Medhabati Devi (mother)
- Awards: Padma Shri Award; Sahitya Academy Award; Soviet Lund Nehru Award

Padma Shri Ashangbam Minaketan Singh is regarded as one of the founders of modern Manipuri literature. He was born as the only child to Ashangbam Jivan Singh and Medhabati Devi on 2 May 1906. His grandfather Ashang Kut, also known as Ashangbam Phura Hongba, served as an Officer in The Maharaja of Manipur's army. In March 1891 he played a part in the assassination of British officials and was thereby sentenced for transportation on charge of murder. He was sentenced twenty five years of life imprisonment at Kalapani Jail, which is located in the Andaman and Nicobar Islands, India.

== Early life ==
Minaketan was born at Wangkhei Ashangbam Leikai now known as Wangkhei Angom Leikai in Ashangbam family but was brought up in the family of royal descendants of Maharaja Nara Singh by Sanajaobi Devi, the granddaughter of Maharaja Nara Singh at Moirangkhom Sougaijam Leirak. He graduated from the University of Calcutta in 1930 and by that time he had mastered English, Bengali, Hindi, Sanskrit and the Old Meitei languages. He belonged to the generation which had grown up and saw the difficult times of Manipur in the socio-economic condition under the monarchic system of government shaped by the colonial rule of British Empire.

== Works ==
Minaketan engaged with several fields of literature including poetry, prose, essays, translations, mythology, biography, autobiography, and criticism. He published more than 25 books on these different branches of literature. Some of his works are Basanta Sheireng (Poetry), 1928; Asheibagi Nityaipod (Poetry), 1976; Asheibagi Sheirol, 1977; Tonu Laijinglembi (Play); Bharatki Lonsingi Marakta (Essay); Meitei Upanyas (Criticism). Ashangbam Minaketan Singh is considered among the pioneer poets of Meitei literature. He had associated himself with many State advisory committees. One inimitable, unique quality of Minaketan is his invention of new words purely from Old Meitei languages spoken in the old days. In Minaketan's poetry, people come across obscure and recondite words or references which are too difficult to understand at the first reading. The vast learning and the vast knowledge he had acquired is expressed in such a twisted manner that it becomes difficult to follow what the poet really intends to say. About Minaketan's style and choice of words, poet Shree Biren has this observation – It is a fact that any reader will find himself a kind of push which violently thrown out at the very threshold. To know the true Minaketan a reader must face this kind of repulsion and must try to open the door and if one had succeeded to open the door of his treasure house then he will surely enjoy the beauty in the writings and words of Minaketan. Minaketan had the power of impressing the imagination by lines of spleen-dour and magnificence suggesting some half-expressed thoughts, some dimly shadowed emotions. In the twilight years of his life he had seen the mother in every woman even in his own daughter. In his poem 'Sanarik Pareng' he penned 'My loving daughter/ you are my mother/ My mother in you darling'. The sense of vastness and immensity is suggested in several lines of his poem 'Bidai Ashirbad'. The mystery of life is exquisitely and yet mystically suggested:

Premna Lingba Jagatnido Puba-nido Premna/ Pubanido Premna Tengbal Hingba-nido Premna

(Love makes the universe love binds the universe/ love gives soul to the world) The body and the soul are united for him with love to the whole of universe.

In his last poem 'Yachang Sheirol Khameen Tengtha' there is an expression of a communion with god with his love of motherland.

== Awards ==
During his lifetime he was honoured and decorated with many titles and awards Sahitya Ratna from Manipuri Sahitya Parishat(1971), Sahitya Academy Award in Asheibagi Nityaipod (Poetry) (1977), Soviet Land Nehru Award (1977), Kavi Samrat from Thangal Marup, Hailakandi, Cachar (1980), The Most Eminent Citizen of Manipur (1985), Padma Shri (1985), Shubharna Jayanti Sanman Award(1986), Jamini Sunder Guha Gold Medal (1988), Thoibi Award (1988), Lalit Memorial Gold Medal (1990) and many more prestigious awards.

== Death and legacy ==
Ashangbam Minaketan Singh lived a fruitful long 89 years even having to see and play with his youngest grandson, encompassing the whole of the 20th century. He died of a cardiac arrest in 1995 leaving behind his family and above all his legacy in Manipuri literature. He was the representative of the Meitei Literature in the whole of 20th century. On his death it was reported that "The Colossus of Manipur has Fallen."

=== Centennial ===
Ashangbam Minaketan State Level Celebration Committee, Imphal observed the 100th birth anniversary of the poet throughout the year 2006, beginning from 2 May 2006, the birthday of the poet. The celebration committee comprising people of literary figure of Manipur included representatives from Manipuri Sahitya Parishad, Naharol Sahitya Premee Samiti, Cultural Forum Manipur, Writers' Forum, and Manipuri Literary Society.
