= Kalakshetra Manipur =

- Logo of Kalakshetra
- Formation: 19 July 1969
- Type: Theatre group
- Location: Manipur, India

Kalakshetra Manipur is an Indian theatre group based in Manipur. It was established on 19 July 1969 by Heisnam Kanhailal. His wife, Sabitri Heisnam, was closely associated with the group. It is registered under Societies' Registration Act XXI of 1860 with its No. 1149 of 1972. Their eldest son Heisnam Tomba is the current Director.

== Mission ==
A scene from the play Pebet

The main objective is to study, revive and project the culture of Manipur through the art of theatre and to set the highest standards of performance to match the best in India and the world theatre scene.

== Laboratory ==
Kalakshetra Manipur believes in a workshop that serves as a laboratory, rather than a production company. it pursues a continuous process of 'renewal of ancestral tradition' for contemporary cultural expression. The artists of the group endeavored to learn afresh the lore of Manipur. They perform 'work-in-progress' shows rather than 'Public Theatre'-a finished production for public exhibition.

The group launched a cultural expedition, organizing theatre events with non-actors in three different socio-cultural contexts. They were:

- Performance of NUPI LAN (Women's war of Manipur, 1939) in which around one hundred women from the market of Imphal town participated in December, 1978 as players
- At Umathel, a village in southern Manipur SANJENNAHA (cowherd) was performed by the villagers in December, 1979
- Introduced theatre in the tribal area of Paite community of Churachandpur district with the production of THANGHOU LEH LIANDOU performed by tribal youths in March 1980.

Along with the training and research programmes the group created notable performances as milestone of an originally alternate theatre.

Heisnam Kanhailal was awarded the Padma Shri award by Government of India in 2004 for his work. The Government of India awarded Heisnam Sabitri the fourth highest civilian honour, Padma Shri, in 2008, for her contributions to Manipuri theatre.

== Productions ==
| Play | Playwright | Director | Year |
|---|---|---|---|
| TamnaLai(Haunting spirit) | Heisnam Kanhailal | Heisnam Kanhailal | 1972 |
| Kabui-Keioiba(Half man half Tiger) | " | " | 1973 |
| Imphal`73 | Improvisation on Shri Biren's poem | H.Kanhailal | 1973 |
| Khomdon Meiroubi(the last maiden) | W.Kamni | H.Kanhailal | 1973 |
| Pebet | Improvisation on the folktale Pebet | H.Kanhailal | 1975 |
| Laigi Machasinga(with the children of God) | Improvisation on the essay of Mao Naga, a major tribal group, of L.Samarendra | H.Kanhailal | 1978 |
| Mrityu Swar | H.Kanhailal | H.Kanhailal | 1985 |
| Memoirs of Africa | Improvisation on the poem by L.Samarendra | H.Kanhailal | 1986 |
| Rashomon | Film script of Akira Kurosawa | dramatized and directed by H.Kanhailal | 1987 |
| Migi Sharang(Human Cage) | H.Kanhailal | H.Kanhailal | 1991 |
| Hijan Harao | Based on the folk poem | dramatized and directed by H.Tomba | 1995 |
| Karna | H.Kanhailal | H.Kanhailal | 1997 |
| Lajja | Based on the Taslima Nasrin's novel | dramatized and directed by H.Kanhailal | 1997 |
| Makokto Pokhaikhi(The head blasted) | H.Tomba | H.Tomba | 1999 |
| Draupadi | dramatized from the story of Mahasweta Devi l | H.Kanhailal | 2000 |
| Kshudito Pashan(Hungry stone) | dramatized from the story of Tagore by H.Kanhailal | H.Tomba | 2003 |
| Kangkhathang(The unused sword) | H.Tomba | H.Tomba | 2005 |
| Sati | Dr.H.S.Shivprakash | H.Tomba | 2005 |
| Dakhgar | Rabindranath Tagore | H.Kanhailal | 2006 |
| Samnadraba Mami | Ensemble | H.Tomba | 2009 |
| The Hungry Stones | Rabindranath Tagore | H. Tomba | 2011 |

Besides these productions, the group created short improvisations and performances as part of its training and research process.

At Cairo in 1991 at the International Festival for Experimental Theatre Sabitri Heisnam won the Best Actress Award for her performance in Migi Sharang (Human Cage). The group worked with different ethnic groups from September, 2005 to August, 2006 and produced two multi-lingual plays, Sati and Dakhgar, directed by H.Tomba and H.Kanhailal, respectively.

== See also ==
- Shumang Kumhei
