= Khwairakpam Chaoba =

Manipuri poet, essayist, novelist

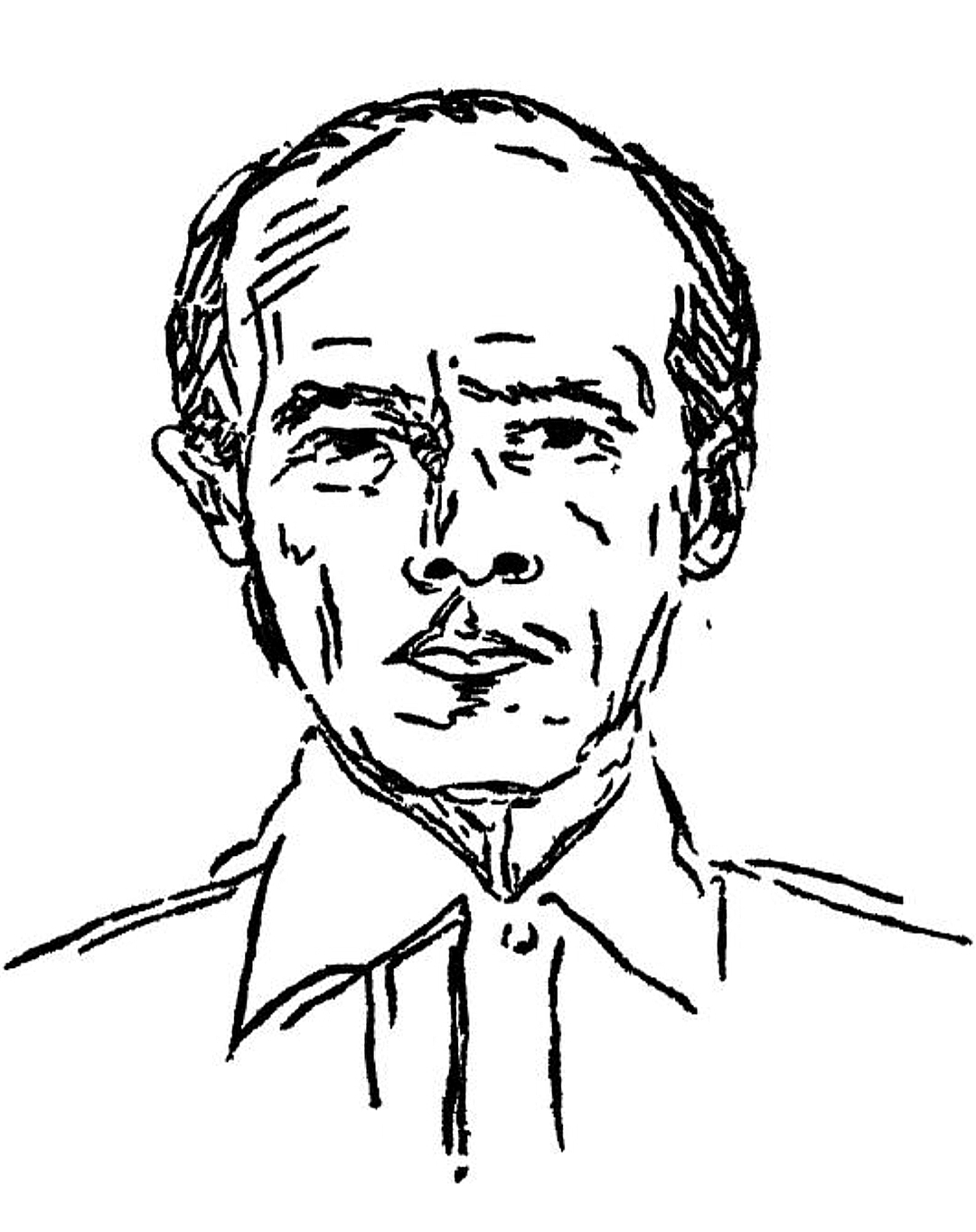
A portrait of Khwairakpam Chaoba

Khwairakpam Chaoba Singh was a poet, essayist, prose-writer and novelist. He was born in 1895 in Uripok Sorbon Thingen Leikai, Imphal. He is regarded as one of the pioneer writers of modern Meitei literature. He founded the Manipuri Sahitya Sammelan of Meitei literature along with Lamabam Kamal Singh, Hijam Irabot and Hijam Anganghal.

== Biography ==
He presented the first historical novel in Meitei – Lavangalata which is considered to be an outstanding work. This is perhaps one of the greatest novels in Meitei literature. His other prose works are Wakhalgi Ichen (Thought Current), Wakhal (Thought), Phidam (Ideal), Kannaba Wa (Useful Words) and Chhatra Macha (Student). He also wrote incomplete works Madhu Malati and Naba-Malika His published work includes:

- Chhatra Macha, 1923
- Kannaba Wa, 1924
- Phidam
- Wakhal
- Wakhalgi Ichen
- Thainagi Leirang, Poetry, 1933
- Lavangalata, Novel, 1937

== Recognition and reception ==
He was awarded the Sahitya Ratna by the Manipur Sahitya Parishad in 1948. Fellow author and poet Elangbam Dinamani Singh included Chaoba in his one of his books about criticism of poets. In Amaresh Datta's Encyclopedia of Indian Literature, Volume 1, he says of Chaoba: "By use of common language and very homely image, [he] could set a good example of elegy in Meitei through this single poem. In fact, many of the poems of [his] contain elegiac elements and atmosphere, as he looks upon the human life from a melancholic and tragic standpoint. This feeling comes to him from his love of everything Manipuri, the flora and fauna, the disintegrated tradition, which was once the beacon light and his deep involvement with the lot of man in his life. Therefore, when he writes about anything, an elegiac feeling pervades his mind and as a result, his expression becomes melancholic and elegiac in nature."
