= Meitei novel =

Novel in the Meitei language

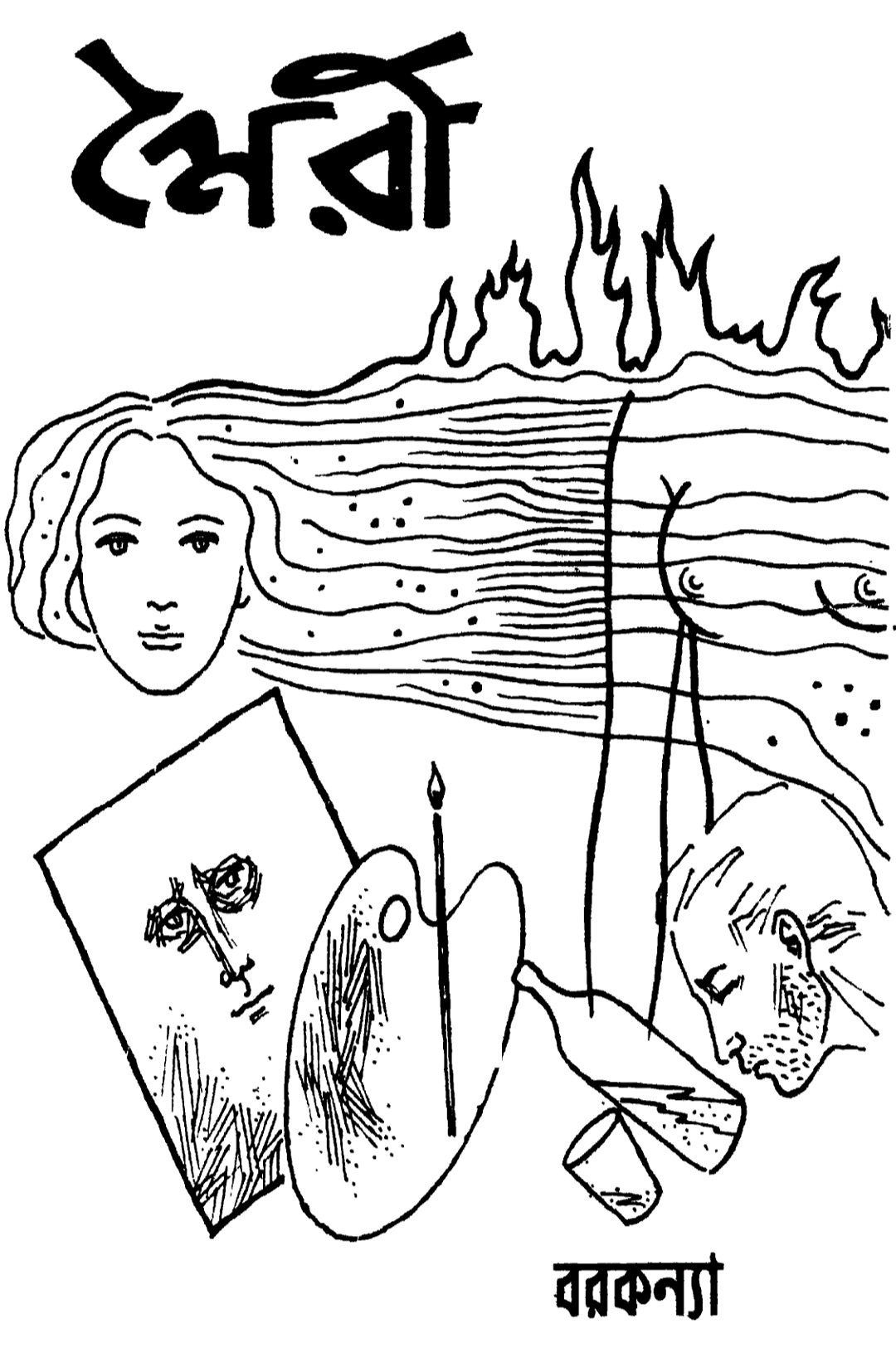
An illustration of a Modern Meitei classic novel Meiri, by Borkanya

Modern Meitei novels (ꯃꯩꯇꯩ ꯅꯣꯚꯦꯜ / ꯃꯅꯤꯄꯨꯔꯤ ꯅꯣꯚꯦꯜ) constitute a significant segment of Meitei literature, developing steadily from the early 20th century onward. While narrative prose works existed prior to World War II, the post-war period marked a more defined emergence of the novel as a distinct literary form. Early novels often reflected traditional values and moral instruction, whereas later works began to explore social, political, and psychological themes shaped by historical events, including the war and subsequent societal changes. The genre encompasses a range of narrative styles, from conventional storytelling to experimental forms, and addresses issues such as caste, gender, identity, displacement, and the tensions between continuity and change within Meitei society.

After the war, Meitei novels slowly developed, starting with idealistic love stories and social themes. Writers like Shitaljit, Guno Singh, and Thoibi Devi built the base. Later, Pacha Meitei brought modern, bold changes. Though not always successful, their works show a society trying to find its voice through fiction.

== Before World War II ==
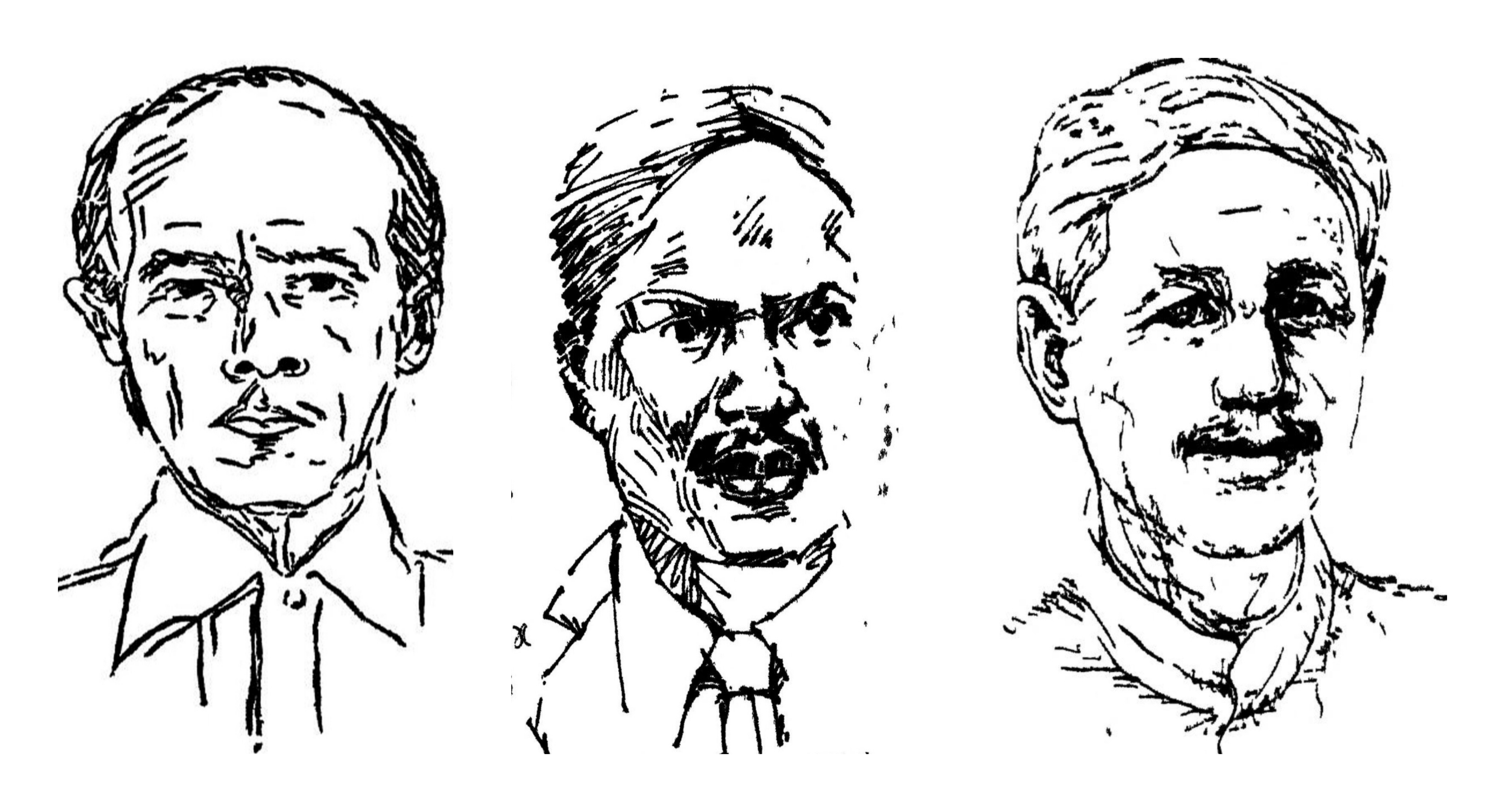
Chaoba, Kamal and Anganghal, the triumvirate of Modern Meitei literature (Contemporary Manipuri literature), including novels, who were the pioneering male writers

=== Kamal's Madhabi (1930) ===
Kamal's Madhabi (ꯃꯥꯙꯕꯤ) is considered the first Meitei novel. It was well-received when it came out. Before this, Manipuri literature did not have any realistic stories reflecting the society of the time. Earlier works like Dhananjoy Laibu Ningbā and Sanamanik were imaginative but not true novels.

Kamal, influenced by other literatures, wrote Madhabi while still a medical student. Although he did not directly deal with serious social or political issues, he created a romantic story with a subtle message.

The novel focuses on two couples. Urirei, a poor girl, loves Biren, a wealthy young man. Madhabi, another girl, loves Dhiren, Biren's friend, but chooses a selfless life helping others. Biren goes to Calcutta to study for six years. During his absence, Urirei suffers abuse from a man named Bhubon who wants to marry her. Madhabi saves Urirei more than once. In the end, Urirei reunites with Biren, but Madhabi disappears.

Though written simply, the novel is praised for its heartfelt portrayal of love, changing society, humor, and vivid descriptions. However, Madhabi's character is too idealized to feel real in the small Manipuri setting.

=== Chaōba's Labanga Lata (1940) ===
This novel is set during the reign of King Khāgemba (ꯈꯥꯒꯦꯝꯕ). It tells the story of a conflict between two half-brothers: Khwairākpā (ꯈ꯭ꯋꯥꯏꯔꯥꯛꯄꯥ) and Yāiskullākpā Sanongba (ꯌꯥꯏꯁ꯭ꯀꯨꯜꯂꯥꯛꯄꯥ ꯁꯥꯅꯣꯡꯕ). The conflict begins when Khwairākpā refuses to marry his daughter Kunjalatā Latāsanā (ꯀꯨꯟꯖꯂꯇꯥ ꯂꯇꯥꯁꯅꯥ) to Labanga (ꯂꯕꯪꯒ), a brave warrior who loves her and serves Sanongba. In revenge, Sanongba picks a petty fight about a damaged boat, which escalates.

The king, unaware of the real cause, believes Sanongba is plotting to take the throne. As a result, Sanongba and Labanga are exiled. Latāsanā follows them out of love.

Sanongba later rebels using Cachari mercenaries. In the battle, both he and Labanga are killed. Latāsanā becomes a widow and spends her life in prayer.

The novel cleverly blends love and politics to explain a historical conflict. Sanongba is the most striking character—proud, emotional, and courageous. However, other characters feel incomplete. There are also historical inaccuracies, like mixing flowers from different seasons or having characters worship Rama before Hinduism had spread in that form.

=== Angāhal's Jahera ===
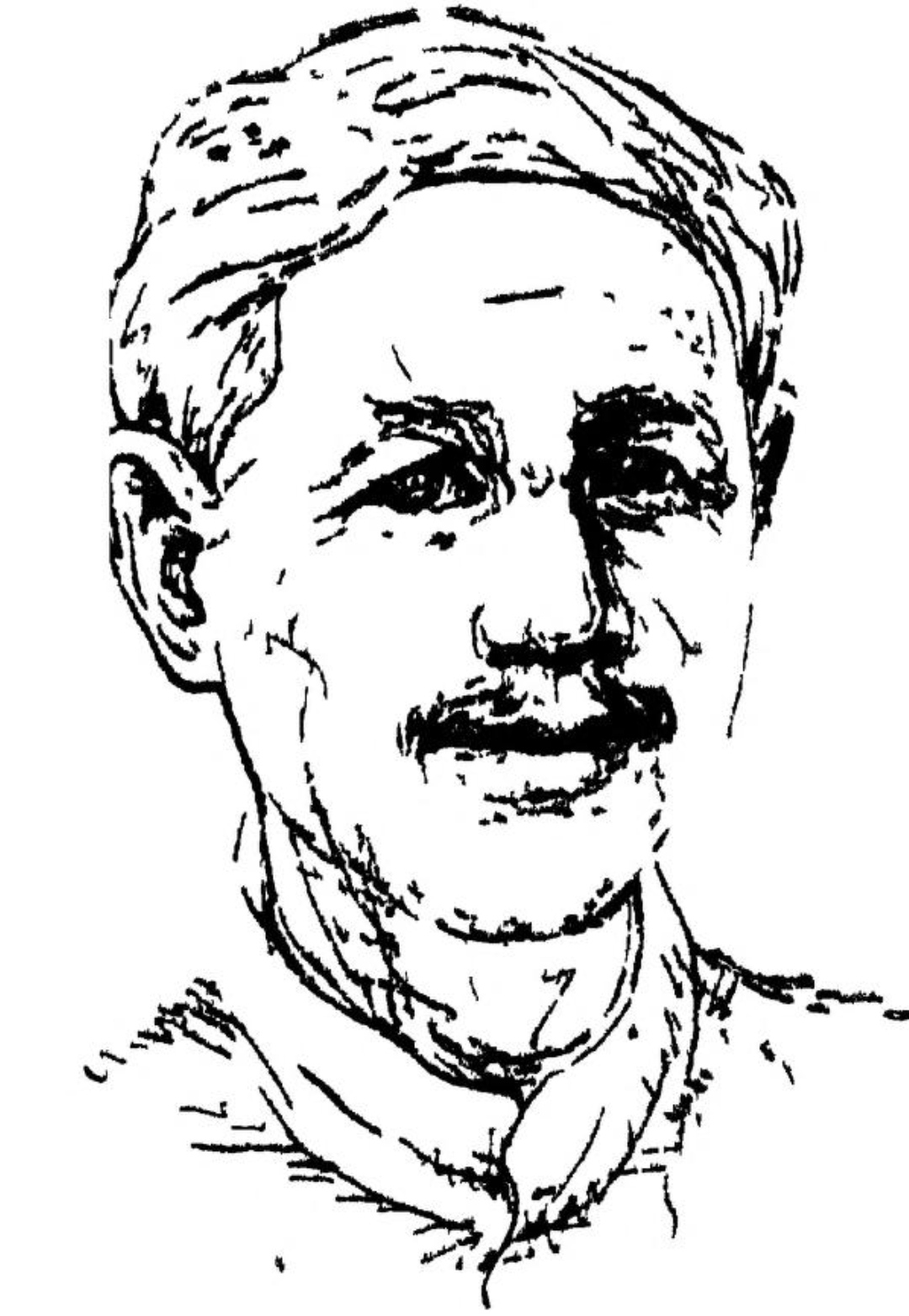
Author Anganghal

In Jahera (ꯖꯍꯦꯔꯥ), Angāhal writes about love between two people from different religions—Kunjo (ꯀꯨꯟꯖꯣ), a Meitei Hindu boy, and Jahera, a Muslim girl—at a time when religious divisions were strict in Meitei society.

They fall in love at first sight, but religious and social pressures keep them apart. Kunjo tries hard to reach out to her with the help of a kind woman named Ibemcha and a man named Gopal. Jahera is also in love, but does not show it due to practical fears.

Because of rumors spread by a Muslim woman named Fatiman, Jahera and her mother are expelled from their community. They move to her sister's house, then return to Manipur. Jahera sees Kunjo one last time before she dies.

Most of the novel's events take place in one small neighborhood. Though the characters are emotionally rich, the writer struggles to fully bring them to life. Jahera especially feels deeply but remains trapped by her situation. She is not weak though—she shows strength in resisting manipulation.

Supporting characters like Ibemcha, Gopal, and Amir are realistically portrayed. The novel also beautifully blends nature into the story and uses a mix of everyday and poetic language, keeping the reader engaged throughout.

=== Shitaljit's Thādokpā (Sacrifice) ===
Shitaljit's first novel, Thādokpā (ꯊꯥꯗꯣꯛꯄ), is a social critique of his time. He points out the growing divide between the rich/powerful and the common people. Social status had become all-important, and respect was mostly given to those with wealth or high positions.

Shitaljit challenges these values through the character Sadananda. He also uses simple language, rejecting the flowery style common then.

==== Plot summary ====
Sadananda (ꯁꯗꯥꯅꯟꯗꯥ), born into poverty, earns an M.A. degree and marries Mukhra (ꯃꯨꯈ꯭ꯔꯥ), a woman from a modest background. Unable to find a job, they move in with Mukhra's parents. Later, her greedy family marries her off to a rich widower. Sadananda does not resist. He starts tutoring children and even sends money to Mukhra. His kindness becomes well known, and the king, breaking tradition, appoints him to top government posts.

Even with such success, Sadananda never remarries. When he is dying, Mukhra returns and asks for forgiveness, which he gives without hesitation. His story symbolizes selflessness and true love.

Though the novel might seem simple, it thoughtfully critiques social values and literary norms of the time.

== After World War II ==
While other parts of India saw rapid growth in novel writing after World War II, Manipur's progress was slow. Drama and poetry were more popular than novels, and even big events like the war or peasant revolts did not inspire many powerful stories.

=== R.K. Shitaljit ===
Shitaljit (ꯁꯤꯇꯜꯖꯤꯠ) was one of the first serious Meitei novelists, known for his idealistic and emotional stories, especially about women's purity and sacrifice.

- Ima (ꯏꯃꯥ, 1947): A complex story about a boy (Ranjit) raised by foster parents. His real mother, in disguise, watches over him secretly. The novel focuses on justice, identity, and sacrifice but suffers from unrealistic events and confusing plotlines.
- Rohini (ꯔꯣꯍꯤꯅꯤ, 1948): Tells the story of an orphaned girl and her younger brother. She faces false rumors, leaves her foster home, and lives under a new name. The story ends with a family reunion.

His characters often seem like puppets in a moral tale rather than real people.

=== Other notable early novels ===
- Jat Onba (ꯖꯥꯠ ꯑꯣꯟꯕ, 1954) by Ram Singh Leitanthem: A love story where caste prevents marriage, leading the couple to run away. It critiques unfair social traditions.
- Khangani Poloida (ꯈꯪꯒꯅꯤ ꯄꯣꯂꯣꯏꯗꯥ, 1963) by Ram Singh: A love story with misunderstandings.

=== R.K. Elangbam's Marup Anee (1967) ===
Elangbam's Marup Anee (ꯃꯔꯨꯞ ꯑꯅꯤ) focuses on Manipur during the war, as seen by two children. It tries to show the emotional and social impact of the war but falls short in depth.

=== Hijam Guno Singh ===
Hijam Guno Singh (ꯍꯤꯖꯝ ꯒꯨꯅꯣ ꯁꯤꯡꯍ) wrote romantic novels set during the war:

- Khudol (ꯈꯨꯗꯣꯜ, 1964): A student gets injured during the war, falls in love with a nurse, and moves on from past love. The plot feels forced but emotional.
- Aroiba Paodam (ꯑꯔꯣꯏꯕ ꯄꯥꯎꯗꯝ, 1965): About a boy and his mother escaping war, living with a poor village family. He falls in love, but confusion and responsibilities change everything. The story mixes romance and war, but not always clearly.
- Laman (ꯂꯃꯟ, 1958): Meant to fight slavery but turns into a typical love story in a tribal setting.
- Eikhoi Tada (ꯑꯩꯈꯣꯏ ꯇꯥꯗꯥ, 1966): About two lost boys, but lacks social depth.

=== Women novelists ===
==== Thoibi Devi ====
The first woman novelist in Meitei literature, Thoibi Devi (ꯊꯣꯏꯕꯤ ꯗꯦꯕꯤ) wrote simple, emotional stories focusing on women's lives.

- Radha (ꯔꯥꯙꯥ, 1965): A woman quietly loves her childhood fiancé, now a doctor, even after marrying someone else. Their eyes meet one last time years later.
- Nungshi Eechel (ꯅꯨꯡꯁꯤ ꯏꯆꯦꯜ, 1967): A comparison of two women—one emotional, one practical—who serve society in different ways.
- Lamja (ꯂꯝꯖꯥ, 1979): A brave story of a single mother who refuses to marry another man and is eventually accepted with her child.
- Chingda Satpi Eengellei (ꯆꯤꯡꯗ ꯁꯥꯠꯄꯤ ꯏꯉꯦꯜꯂꯩ, 1979): A fairy-tale-like story with a twist: a tribal woman turns out to be the biological mother of a noble man.

==== M.K. Binodini Devi ====
Binodini Devi's novel Bor Saheb Ongbi Sanatombi (ꯕꯣꯔ ꯁꯥꯍꯦꯕ ꯑꯣꯡꯕꯤ ꯁꯅꯥꯇꯣꯝꯕꯤ, 1976) tells the story of a princess who leaves her husband to live with a British officer. The novel received a divided response from readers, with some praising the protagonist's courage and others criticizing her actions. The book depicts royal life, culture, and society during the period.

=== Socially critical novels ===
- Khumanthem Ibohal Singh (ꯈꯨꯃꯟꯊꯦꯝ ꯏꯕꯣꯍꯜ ꯁꯤꯡꯍ): His novels like Imana Eibu Manghanbani (ꯏꯃꯥꯅ ꯑꯩꯕꯨ ꯃꯥꯡꯍꯟꯕꯅꯤ, 1951) and Eidi Oktabini (ꯑꯩꯗꯤ ꯑꯣꯛꯇꯕꯤꯅꯤ, 1953) deal with moral decline and confusion in post-war Manipur.
- A. Chitreshwar Sarma (ꯆꯤꯇ꯭ꯔꯦꯁ꯭ꯋꯔ ꯁꯔꯃꯥ): Wrote more realistic stories about rural and urban youth.

=== Modern, experimental writings of Pacha Meitei ===
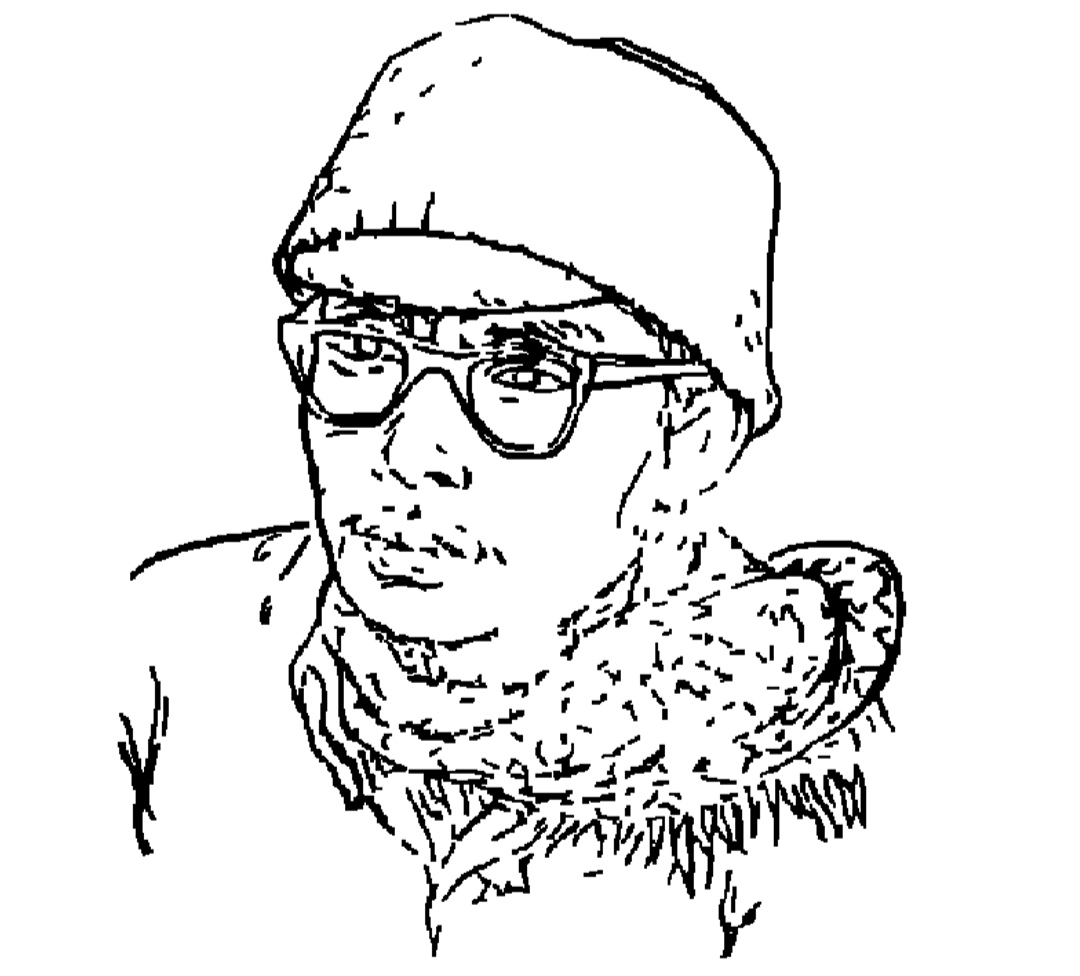
Loitongbam Pacha Meetei

Pacha Meitei (ꯄꯆꯥ ꯃꯩꯇꯩ) changed the style of Meitei novels. His writing was experimental, using stream-of-consciousness and monologues (characters talking to themselves).

- Na Tathiba Ahal Ama (ꯅꯥ ꯇꯥꯊꯤꯕ ꯑꯍꯜ ꯑꯃ, 1969): A story told from one character's mind, using memories and reflections. It breaks traditional storytelling.
- Imphal amasung Magi Eesing Nungsitki Phibham (ꯏꯝꯐꯥꯜ ꯑꯃꯁꯨꯡ ꯃꯥꯒꯤ ꯏꯁꯤꯡ ꯅꯨꯡꯁꯤꯠꯀꯤ ꯐꯤꯚꯝ, 1972): A scholar visits Manipur and is shocked by its moral decay. He decides to share only dry facts, not his disappointment.
- Later works became darker and more fragmented, showing personal frustration, possibly due to alcoholism.
- Thanil (ꯊꯥꯅꯤꯜ, 1979): His last novel, long and traditional, about a rich man and a married servant. It lacked focus and seemed tired.

=== Works of BM Maisnamba ===
BM Maisnamba is a significant figure in contemporary Meitei literature, recognized for his distinctive narrative style and engagement with historical, social, and cultural themes. His body of work comprises fifteen novels, including Atithi Amagi Ahing (1978), Sorarengi Machanupi (1980), Ahinggi Nupi (1989), Kangla Diary (1999), Imphal Turel Mapalgi Rajkumari (1995), and Imashi Nurabi (2004). His Ningthemnubi trilogy—Pongi Uchek (2006), Ahinggi Laibar (2006), and Konung Mihaat (2006)—is widely regarded as his major literary achievement. He also authored a five-part series comprising Shridham Nabadwip Ogbi (2008), Shrimati Kumarika (2008), Shrimati Kumari Devadasi (2009), Basantagi Kokil Amom (2012), and two sequels to Imashi Nurabi titled Nurabi Sayon (2013) and Chittagong Reporter. Among these, Imashi Nurabi and the Ningthemnubi trilogy have attained particular prominence within the corpus of Meitei literature. Imashi Nurabi was awarded the Manipur State Kala Akademy Award in 2006 and the Sahitya Akademi Award in 2007. In 2008, Maisnamba became the first recipient of the Manipur State Award for Literature, also for Imashi Nurabi. These two works have been further recognized by various literary and cultural organizations through additional honours.

== See also ==
- Modern Meitei poetry

== Bibliography ==
- Nahakpam Aruna, A Collection of Critical Essays in Manipuri Literature, Imphal, 2001.
- Joseph Warren Beach, 20th Century Novel Studies in Techniques, New York : Appleton-Century-Crofts, ©1932.
- John Barth. "The Literature of Replenishment". The Friday Book. Baltimore: Johns Hopkins University Press, 1984.
- Stream-of-consciousness technique in the modern novel, Port Washington, N.Y. : Kennikat Press, 1979.
- The cultural forum, Manipur, Ritu Literary Journal, April, 1999.
- Manipur Sahitya Parishad, Glimpse of Manipuri Language and Literature, Imphal 1970.
- Pacha, Na Tathiba Ahal Ama 1969, Imphal and its climatic conditions, 1972
