= Meitei literature =

Northeast Indian literature

Meitei literature (Manipuri literature) Meitei: Meitei Khorirol Old Manipuri: Meitei Loinasinlol British English: Meit(h)ei literature (Note: Most British scholars including Thomas Callan Hodson use the term "Meit(h)ei" instead of "Meitei".)
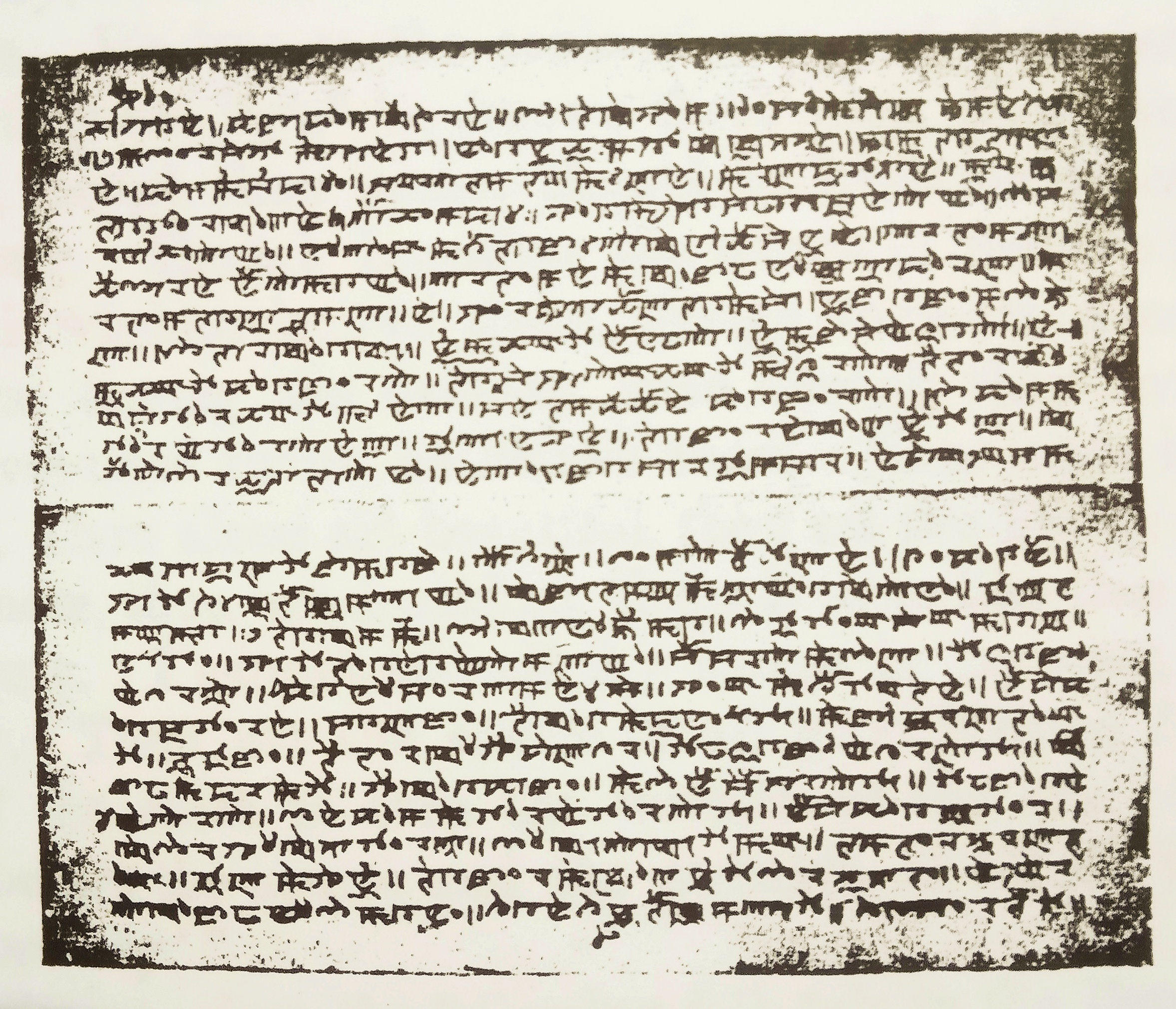
- The Numit Kappa, a Classical Meitei epic text written during the 1st century, based on ancient Meitei mythology and religion (Sanamahism)
- Stylistic origins: Meitei culture
- Cultural origins: Meitei culture

Subgenres
- Meitei mythology; Meitei folklore; Meitei epics Epic cycles of incarnations; Meitei cinema

Related topics
- Puya (Meitei texts) Puya Meithaba (Libricide of the PuYas); Meitei language movements Meitei linguistic purism movement Meitei classical language movement

Meitei literature, also known as Manipuri literature, is literature written in the Meitei language of Manipur. An ancient institution of learning, the Luwang Nonghumsang, later known as the Pandit Loishang, collected sources of indigenous Meitei knowledge and philosophy until the 18th century. Writing by Meiteis is assumed to go back to the Kingdom of Kangleipak in the early 12th century. The Meitei script is a Brahmic abugida. It is known only from the Puya manuscripts discovered in the first half of the 20th century. Manuscripts of the 18th and 19th centuries were written using the Bengali alphabet. The existence of the Meitei script in the 15th-century hinges on the authenticity of an inscription dated to the reign of Senbi Kiyamba. The first printed Manipuri book, Manipurer Itihas, appeared in 1890 from the Baptist Mission Press, Calcutta. Though the kings of Manipur had established contact with the British from the middle of the eighteenth century onward the real impact of the contact came much later. Johnstone Middle English School, based on the western system of education, was started in 1885 at Imphal, and in 1891 Manipur lost its independence to the British. British domination facilitated the introduction of new systems in the civil, political and educational spheres, which hastened the process of modernisation in Manipur, exposed as it was to new ideas and influences.

== Ancient Meitei literature ==
=== Chada Laihui ===
The Chada Laihui (Meitei: ꯆꯥꯗꯥ ꯂꯥꯢꯍꯨꯢ) is a historical document (puya), about the genealogy of the Meitei kings from their mothers' sides. It traces the genealogical account of the kings' mothers' lineage. It is a supplementary document to the Cheitharol Kumbaba, the foremost royal chronicle of Manipur.

=== Moirang Ningthourol Lambuba ===
"Moirang Ningthourol Lambuba" (Meitei: ꯃꯣꯢꯔꯥꯡ ꯅꯤꯡꯊꯧꯔꯣꯜ ꯂꯝꯕꯨꯕ) is a historical document (puya), which served as the court chronicle of the rulers of the kingdom in Ancient Moirang. It records the genealogy of the kings of the Moirang dynasty.

The chronicle also slightly mentioned about the history of the Zeliangrong people.

== Modern Meitei literature ==
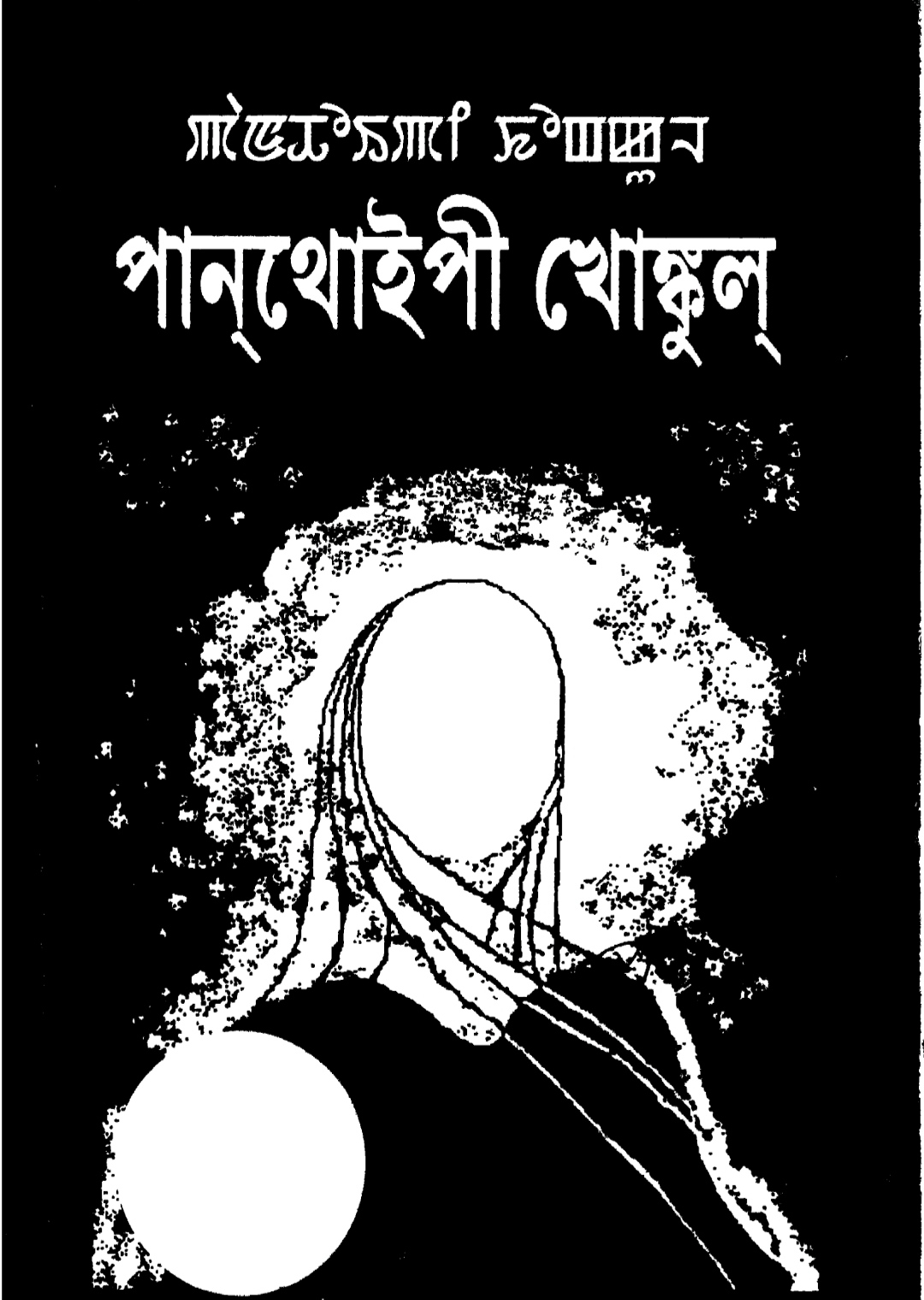
"Panthoipee Khongkul", a Modern Meitei language edition (in Bengali script) of the same Ancient Meitei language classical text (in traditional Meetei Mayek writing system), done by Moirangthem Chandra

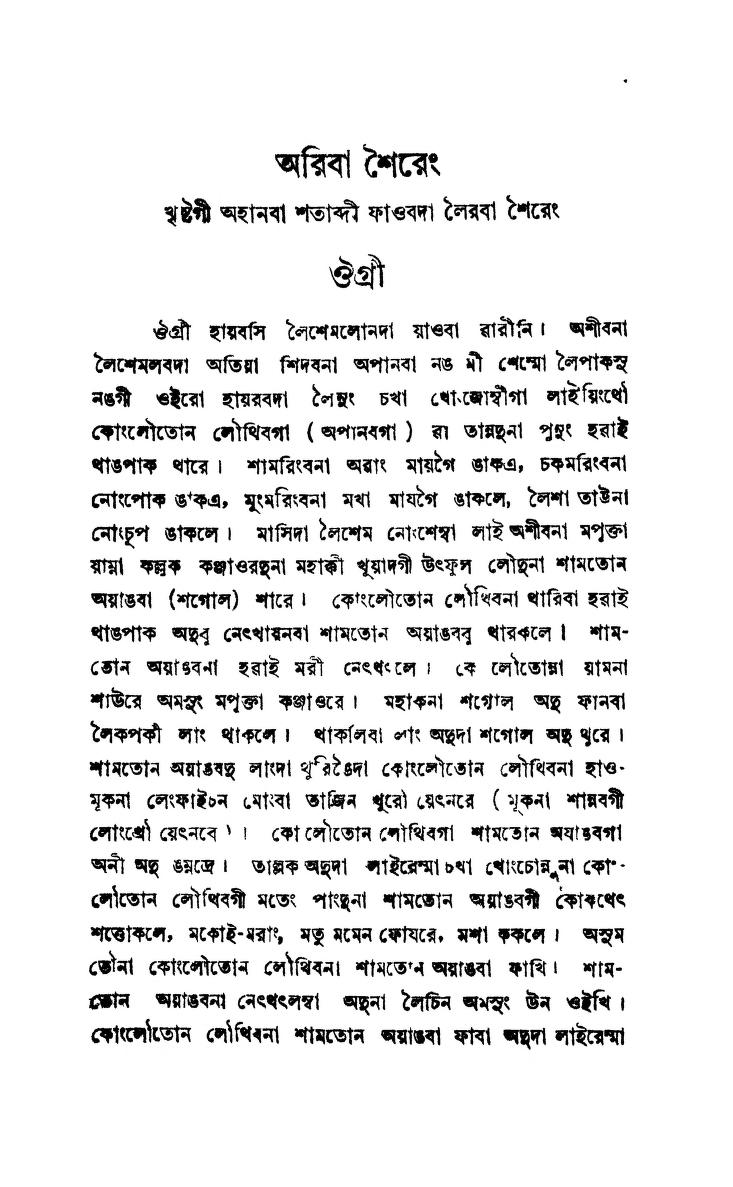
Modern Meitei language version of the explanation of Ougri, an ancient Meitei language holy & sacred musical epic poem, described by Khelchandra Ningthoukhongjam, in Bengali script

=== Modern Meitei novels ===
Modern Meitei novels (ꯃꯩꯇꯩ ꯅꯣꯚꯦꯜ / ꯃꯅꯤꯄꯨꯔꯤ ꯅꯣꯚꯦꯜ) constitute a significant segment of Meitei literature, developing steadily from the early 20th century onward. After the World War II, a distinct form of the novels developed as a unique literary genre. Early Modern Meitei novels usually showed traditional values and moral instruction, whereas later works began to explore social, political, and psychological themes shaped by historical events, including the war and subsequent societal changes. The genre covers a range of narrative styles, from conventional storytelling to experimental forms, and tells about issues such as caste, gender, identity, displacement, and the tensions between continuity and change within Meitei society. Modern Meitei novels also has idealistic love stories and social themes, like the works of Shitaljit, Guno Singh, and Thoibi Devi, who built the base. Later, Pacha Meitei brought bold changes. Though not always successful, their works show a society trying to find its voice through fiction.

=== Modern Meitei poetry ===
Modern Meitei poetry (ꯑꯅꯧꯕ ꯃꯩꯇꯩꯂꯣꯟ ꯁꯩꯔꯦꯡ / ꯑꯅꯧꯕ ꯃꯅꯤꯄꯨꯔꯤ ꯁꯩꯔꯦꯡ) refers to Meitei poetry from the 20th century onward, particularly before and after World War II. The period before WWII saw the birth of Modern Meitei poetry. Poets like Chaoba, Kamal, and Anganghal used their talents to bring a new phase of the Meitei language and literature, mixing tradition with new ideas, having different styles and focuses. After World War II, Modern Meitei literature saw a major shift from romantic and traditional poetry to more modern, realistic, and experimental styles. A new generation of young, urban poets emerged, expressing disillusionment with society, politics, and traditional values through bold imagery and free forms influenced by global movements like symbolism and surrealism.

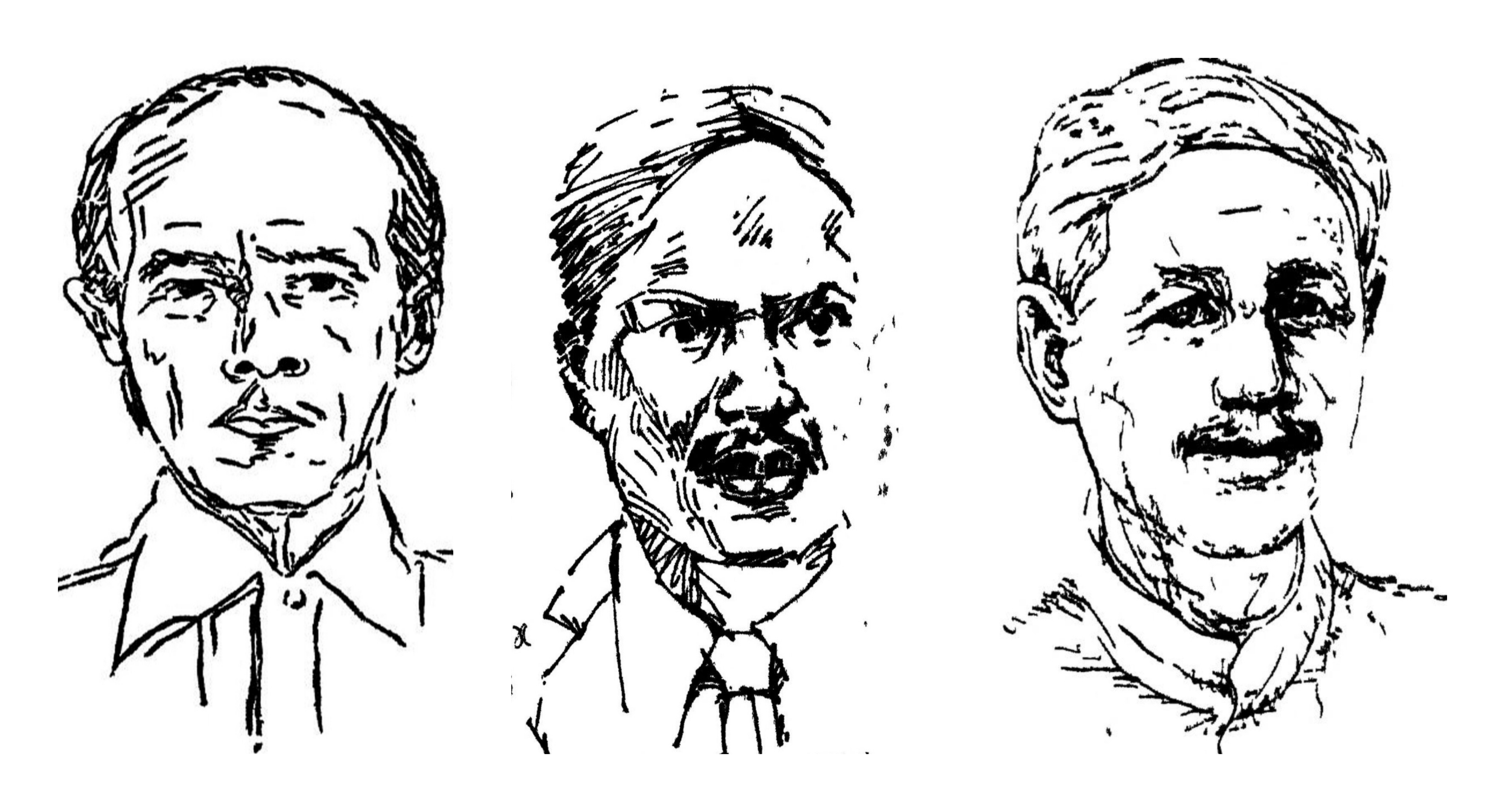
Chaoba, Kamal and Anganghal, the triumvirate of Modern Meitei poetry (Contemporary Manipuri literature), who were the pioneering male writers

== Puyas ==
Puyas are Meitei manuscripts written in Meitei script. They encompass a wide variety of topics such as religion, mythology, chronicle, folk medicine of Meitei people, history etc. Archaic Meitei script which consist of 18 alphabets is derived from Wakoklon Puya Puya manuscripts have been discovered by scholars, beginning in the 1930s. The chronicles of puya state that Hindus arrived from the Indian subcontinent with royal marriages by the 14th century, from what are now modern Assam, Bengal, Uttar Pradesh, Dravidian kingdoms, and other regions. Another manuscript suggests that Muslims arrived in Manipur in the 17th century, from what is now Bangladesh, during the reign of king Khagemba. Cheitharol kumbaba and other puya such as Ningthourol Lambuba documents the persistent and devastating Manipur–Burma wars.

Lists of Puya

- Wakoklon Heelel Thilel Salai Amailon Pukok Puya
- Nongsamei Puya
- Samsokngamba Puya
- Nongsamei Puya
- Nongkhai Puya Amailon
- Cheitharol Kumbaba

== Suppression of Meitei Literature ==
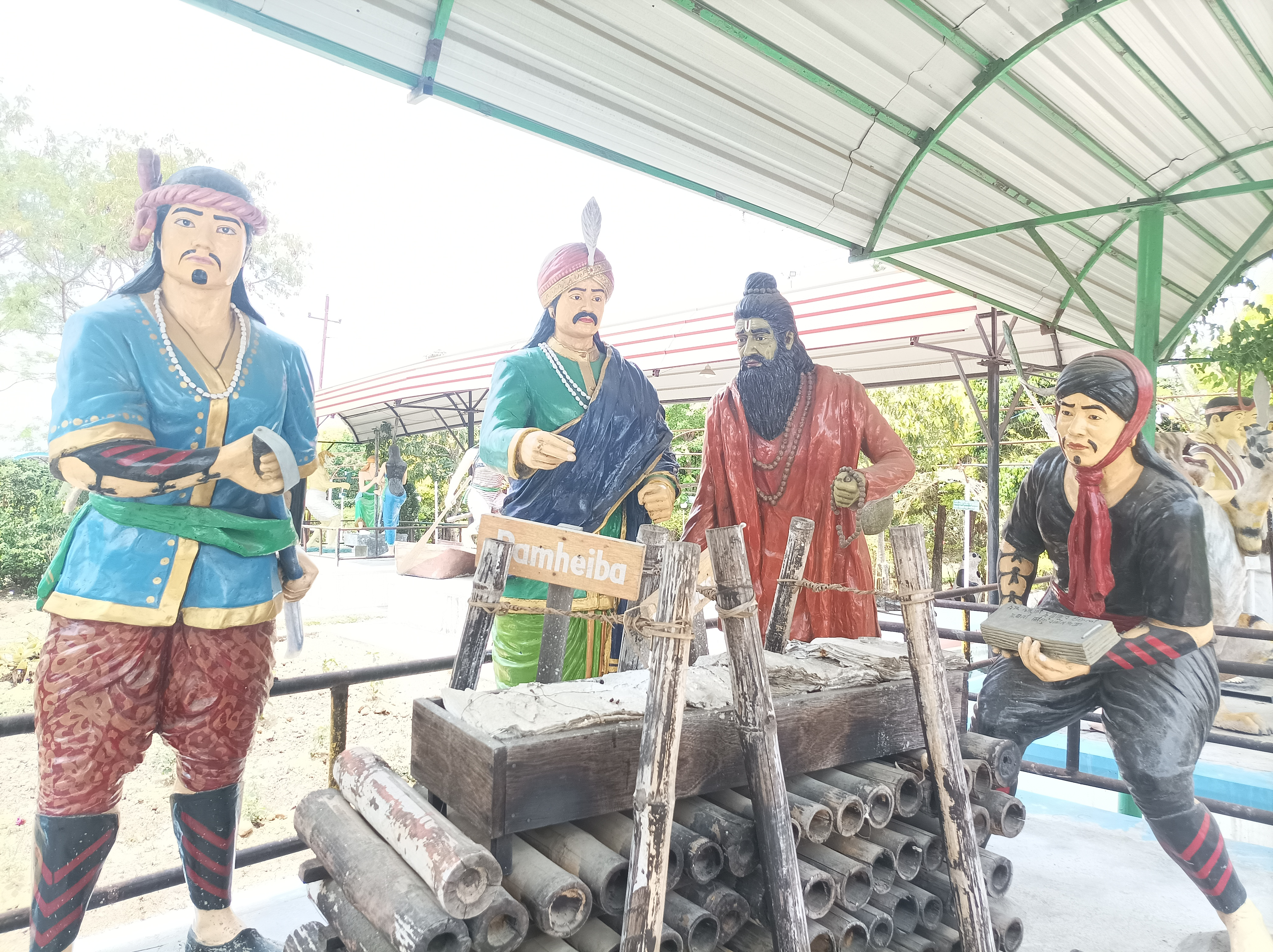
Depiction of the Puya Mei Thaba (Burning of the Meitei texts) believed to have been ordered by king Pamheiba (Garib Niwaj)

After the adoption of Hinduism as state religion under Gharib Nawaz (Meitei: Pamheiba) (1717), the Puyas were "burnt completely" at Kangla Uttra under royal orders, in either 1729 or in 1732.

The Puya manuscripts discovered in the 20th century at best have a tenuous connection with the texts burned under Gharib Nawaz. Like the Hindu and Jain Puranas, the extant Puyas contain cosmology, genealogies of gods and goddesses, and royal chronicles.

== Epics ==
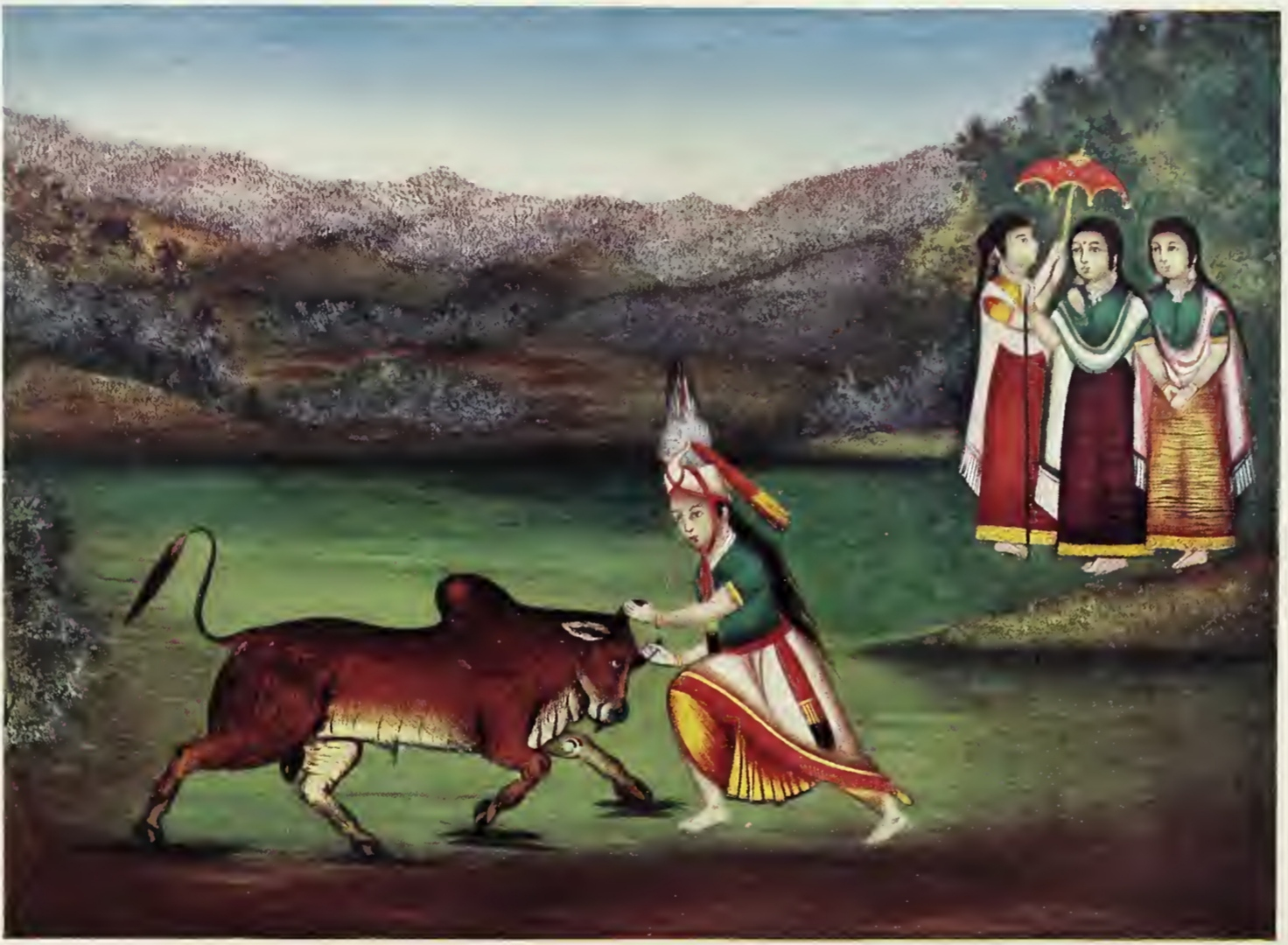
The Capture of the wild Kao (bull) by Khamba

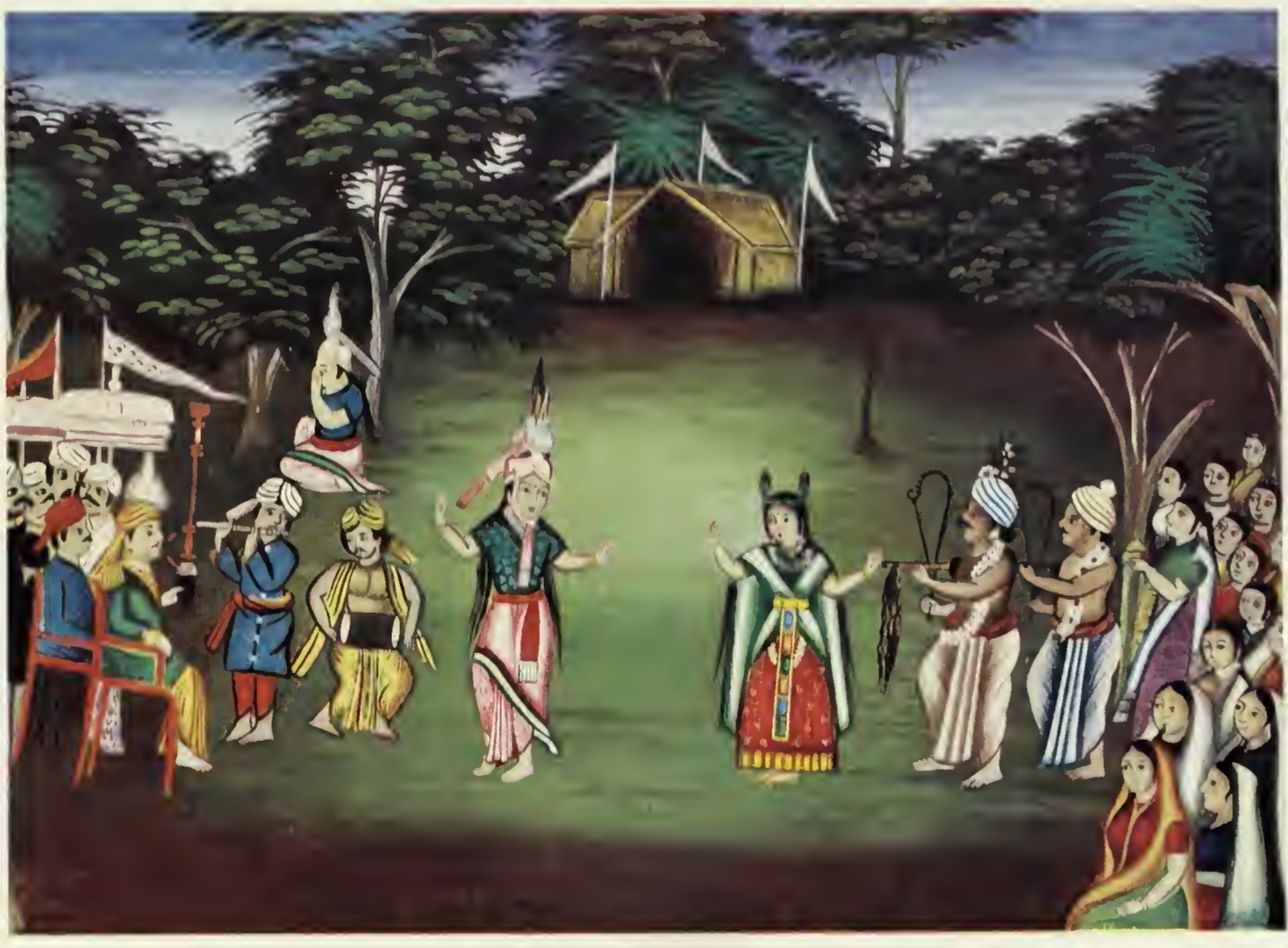
The Dance before the King by Khamba and princess Thoibi

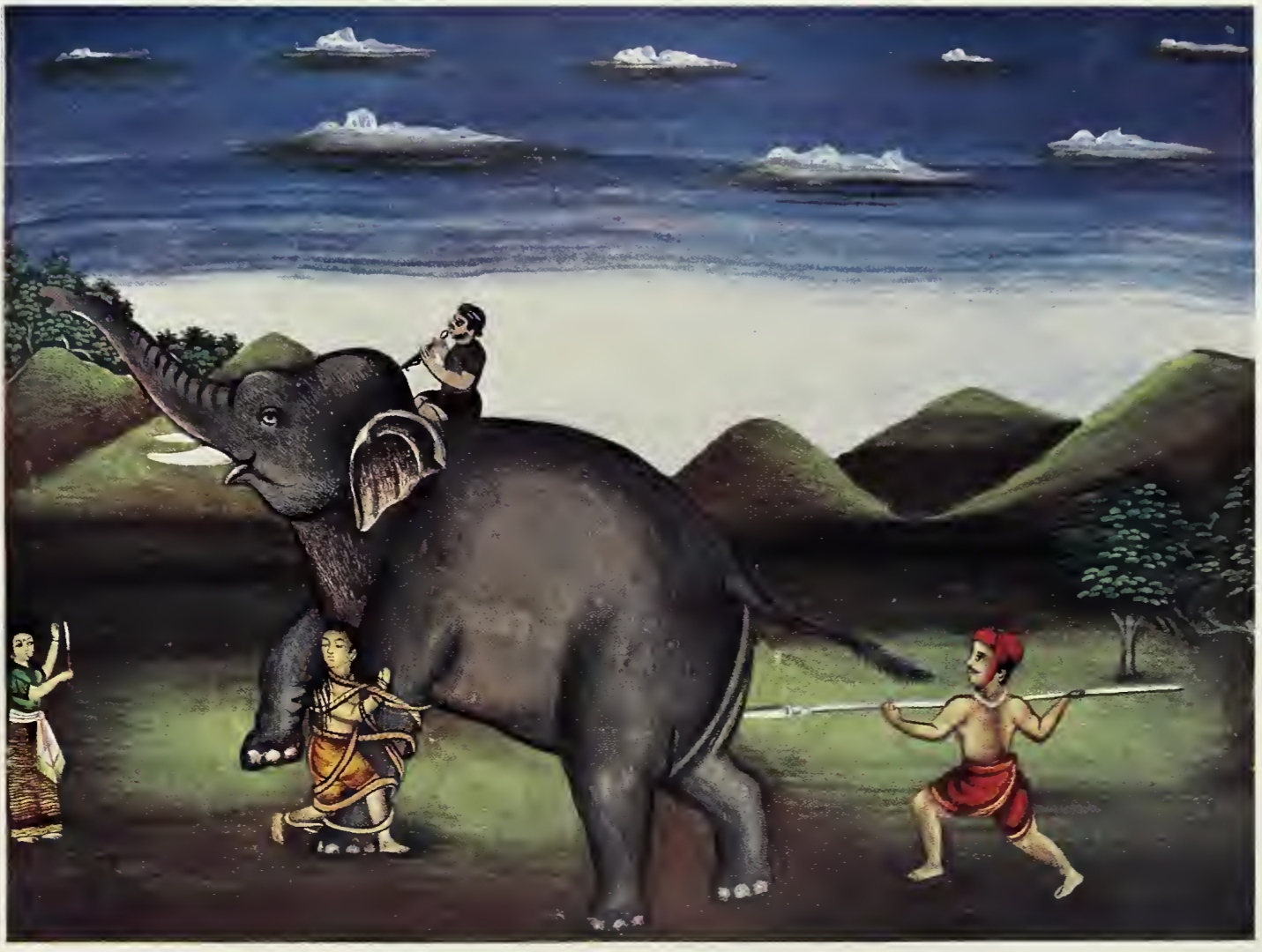
The Torture of Khamba by the Elephant

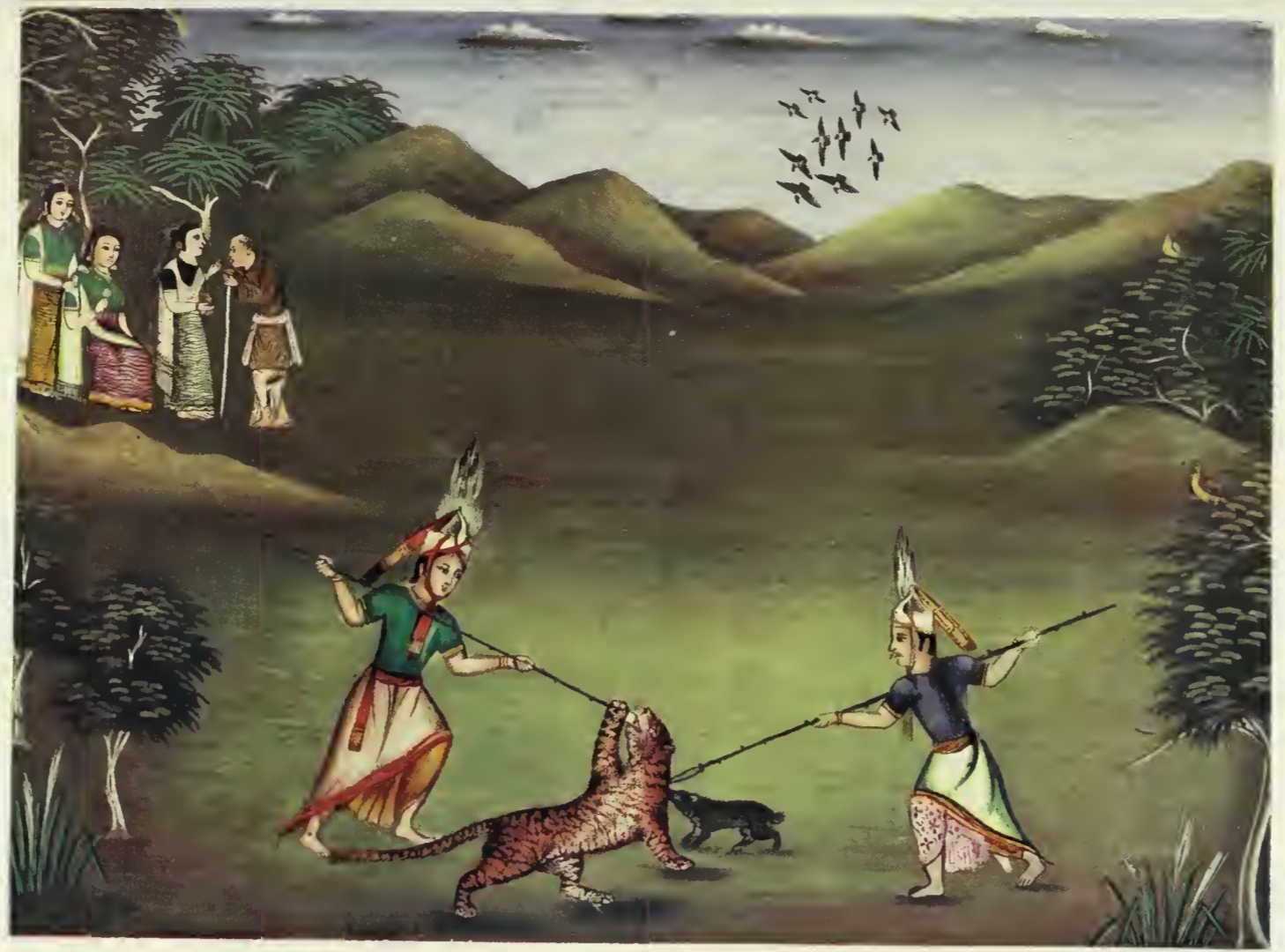
The Tiger Hunt by Khamba and his rival Nongban Kongyamba

Scenes from the Khamba Thoibi epic legend

The Numit Kappa ("Shooting the Sun") is a mythological text in narrative verse. It was published in English translation by T.C. Hodson (1908). A translation into modern Meitei was published in 1908.

Ougri (also known as Leiroi Ngongloi Eshei) is a poem written in archaic Meitei.

The sagas of the seven epic cycles of incarnations of the two divine lovers were originated from Moirang kingdom near the shores of the Loktak lake in Ancient Kangleipak (early Manipur). Among them, Khamba Thoibi is regarded as the last and the greatest epic.

== Chronicles ==
The Ningthourol Shingkak is a work written under Gharib Nawaz (Meitei: Pamheiba), written in the mode of "predictions" made during the rule of Khagemba (r. 1597–1652) and thus foretelling the birth and reign of Gharib Nawaz and his religious reforms. The Cheitharol Kumbaba or "Royal Chronicle" is a text written down in the early 19th century, under Jai Singh, the puppet king installed after the Burmese invasion, purportedly based on an older copy which was no longer available. It contains day-to-day transactions and occurrences the state.

== Scriptures ==
The Meitei scriptures are texts regarding Sanamahism and Meitei mythology. They are the sacred literature to the followers of the Meitei religion. Some of the puyas are regarded as scriptures, but not all of them.

== Literary awards ==
=== Sahitya Akademi awards ===
- Sahitya Akademi Award for Meitei
- Sahitya Akademi Translation Prize for Meitei
- Yuva Puraskar for Meitei

=== Patriotic Writers' Forum awards ===
- Pacha Meetei Literary Award
- R Kathing Tangkhul Literary Award
- Dr Saroj Nalini Parratt Literary Award

== See also ==
- Aribam Syam Sharma
- Heisnam Kanhailal
- History of Manipur
- Meitei mythology
- Khwairakpam Chaoba
- M. K. Binodini Devi
- Meitei inscriptions
- Rajkumar Singhajit Singh
- Ratan Thiyam
- List of Sahitya Akademi Award winners for Meitei
