= Sabitri Heisnam =

Indian actress

- From the play, Pebet
- Born: 5 January 1946 (age 80); Mayang Imphal, Manipur, India
- Occupation: Stage actor
- Years active: Since 1950s
- Known for: Manipuri theatre
- Spouse: Heisnam Kanhailal
- Awards: Padma Shri; Sangeet Natak Akademi Award; Manipur State Kala Akademi Award; Cairo International Festival Critics' Award; Nandikar Award; Natya Ratna

Sabitri Heisnam is an Indian stage actor and one of the notable theatre personalities in Manipuri theatre. She has also acted in the critically acclaimed short film, Scribbles on Akka (2000), directed by Madhusree Dutta, which won the IDPA Award, best script award at Shanghai International Film Festival and the National Film Award for Best Anthropological Film. She is a recipient of the Sangeet Natak Akademi Award of 1991. The Government of India awarded her the fourth highest civilian honour of the Padma Shri, in 2008, for her contributions to Manipuri theatre.

== Biography ==
Heisnam Sabitri was born on 5 January 1946 in a Meitei family in the periphery of Mayang Imphal in the northeast Indian state of Manipur. Gouramani Devi, her aunt and a known stage actor, trained Sabitri from a young age and introduced her to theatre as a child artist, the lead role in Nimai Sanyas as 'Nimai' and as 'Queen Chintamani' in Shri Vasta-Chintamani were two of her notable early performances. Her career took a turn with her performance in Layeng Ahanba (first treatment), directed by Heisnam Kanhailal in 1961, and she married Kanhailal the next year; she was also a part of the group led by him who would found Kalakshetra Manipur in 1969.

Heisnam Sabitri has made many notable performances on various stages in India and abroad, including Japan and Egypt; 'Ekhoulangbi' in Ekhoulangbi (1970), 'widow mother' in Tamnalai (1972), 'old woman' in Kabui Keioiba (1973), 'mother pebet' in Pebet (1975), 'tribal woman' in Laigi Machasinga (1978), 'Mi' in Memoirs of Africa (1985), 'Thambam' in Migi Sharang (1990) and 'Radha' in Karna (1997) are some of her major productions under Kalakshetra. Her portrayal of Draupadi, in the drama of the same name based on a short story by Mahasweta Devi, made news as the final moments of the play saw her dropping her clothes one by one and stripping naked on stage. After its first two stagings on 14 April and 20 April in the year 2000, the performance evoked public protest for deemed obscenity, but is known to have inspired a group of twelve women to stage a protest by parading naked in front of Army personnel in 2004 who were alleged to have raped and killed a woman. The role of a young boy, enacted by her while she was in her sixties, in Dakghor, a drama based on one of Rabindranath Tagore's short stories, was another performance which drew critical acclaim.

Sabitri, a former government nominated member of the Sangeet Natak Akademi, also acted in Mahadevi Akka, a short film of 60 minutes duration directed by Madhusree Dutta in 1999, where she acted as the title character and the film won the National Film Award for the best anthropological film as well as IDPA Award of the Indian Documentary Producers' Association and the award for the best screenplay at the Shanghai International Film Festival. Nemi Chandra Jain, a renowned theatre personality, has documented the career of Sabitri Heisnam in his book, From the Wings, Notes on Indian Theatre, which is a prescribed academic text at Christ University. Natarang Pratishthan, a knowledge repository of Indian theatre, has compiled around 100 documents related to her performances, which include books, posters, news reports and articles, photographs and video clippings.

== Awards and honours ==
Manipur State Kala Akademi awarded Sabitri their annual award for acting in 1988 and the Sangeet Natak Akademi Award reached her in 1991. The same year, she received the Critics' Award for best actor at the III Cairo International Festival for Contemporary and Experimental Theatre for her performance in Migi Sharang (Human Cage). Her performance in the 2001 production, Death of Two Women earned her the Fellowship of Majlis Culture, Mumbai, an award-winning platform for interdisciplinary arts, which commented on her technique of breathing and its influence on performance. In 2002, Nandikar, a Kolkata-based theatre group and the Department of Child and Woman Development, Government of India awarded her the Nandikar Award and she received the Natya Ratna title in 2006. The Government of India awarded her the civilian honour of the Padma Shri in 2008.

== See also ==
- Heisnam Kanhailal
- Kalakshetra Manipur
- Ima Sabitri
