= Modern Meitei poetry =

20th century Meitei poetry

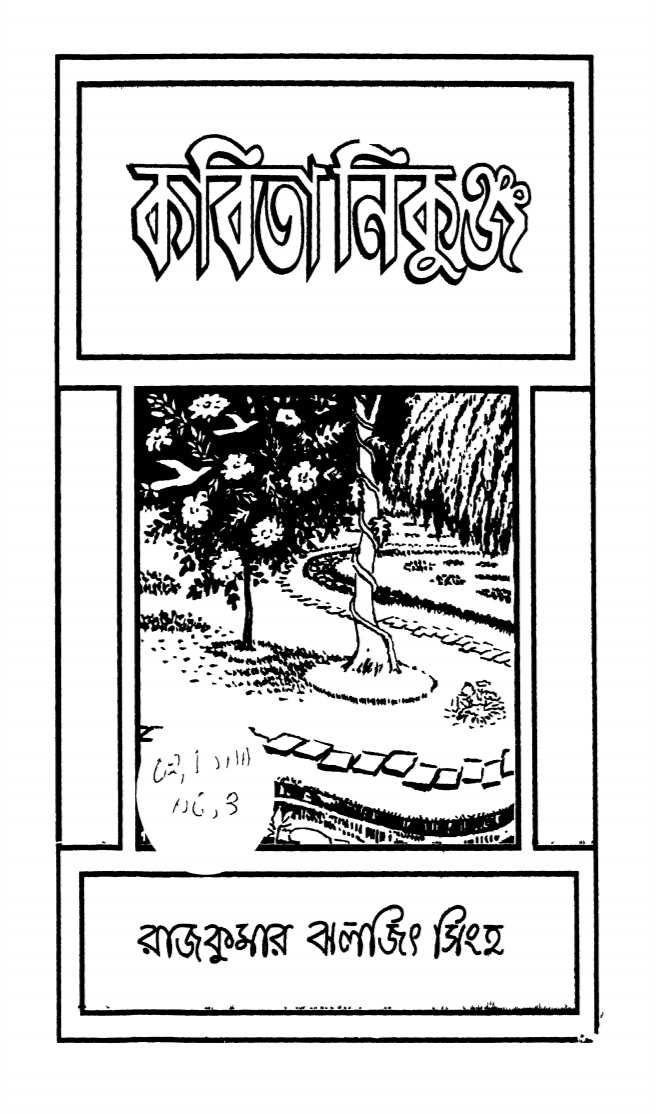
A post World War II Meitei poetry book

Modern Meitei poetry (ꯑꯅꯧꯕ ꯃꯩꯇꯩꯂꯣꯟ ꯁꯩꯔꯦꯡ / ꯑꯅꯧꯕ ꯃꯅꯤꯄꯨꯔꯤ ꯁꯩꯔꯦꯡ) refers to poetic works composed in the Meitei language (also known as Manipuri language) from the 20th century onward, particularly before and after World War II. Marked by a shift from romantic and traditional themes to contemporary concerns, it explores issues such as political unrest, cultural dislocation, and personal identity. Influenced by modernist and postmodernist trends, it features experimentation with form, language, and symbolism, reflecting the changing social and intellectual landscape of Manipur.

The period before WWII saw the birth of modern Meitei poetry. Poets like Chaoba, Kamal, and Angahal used their talents to bring the Meitei language and literature back to life. They blended tradition with new ideas, and even though each had a different style and focus, together they laid the foundation for future Meitei literature.

After World War II, Meitei literature saw a major shift from romantic and traditional poetry to more modern, realistic, and experimental styles. A new generation of young, urban poets emerged, expressing disillusionment with society, politics, and traditional values through bold imagery and free forms influenced by global movements like symbolism and surrealism. While some older poets continued writing in classical styles, the younger voices brought a fresh, often critical perspective that marked a turning point in Meitei poetry.

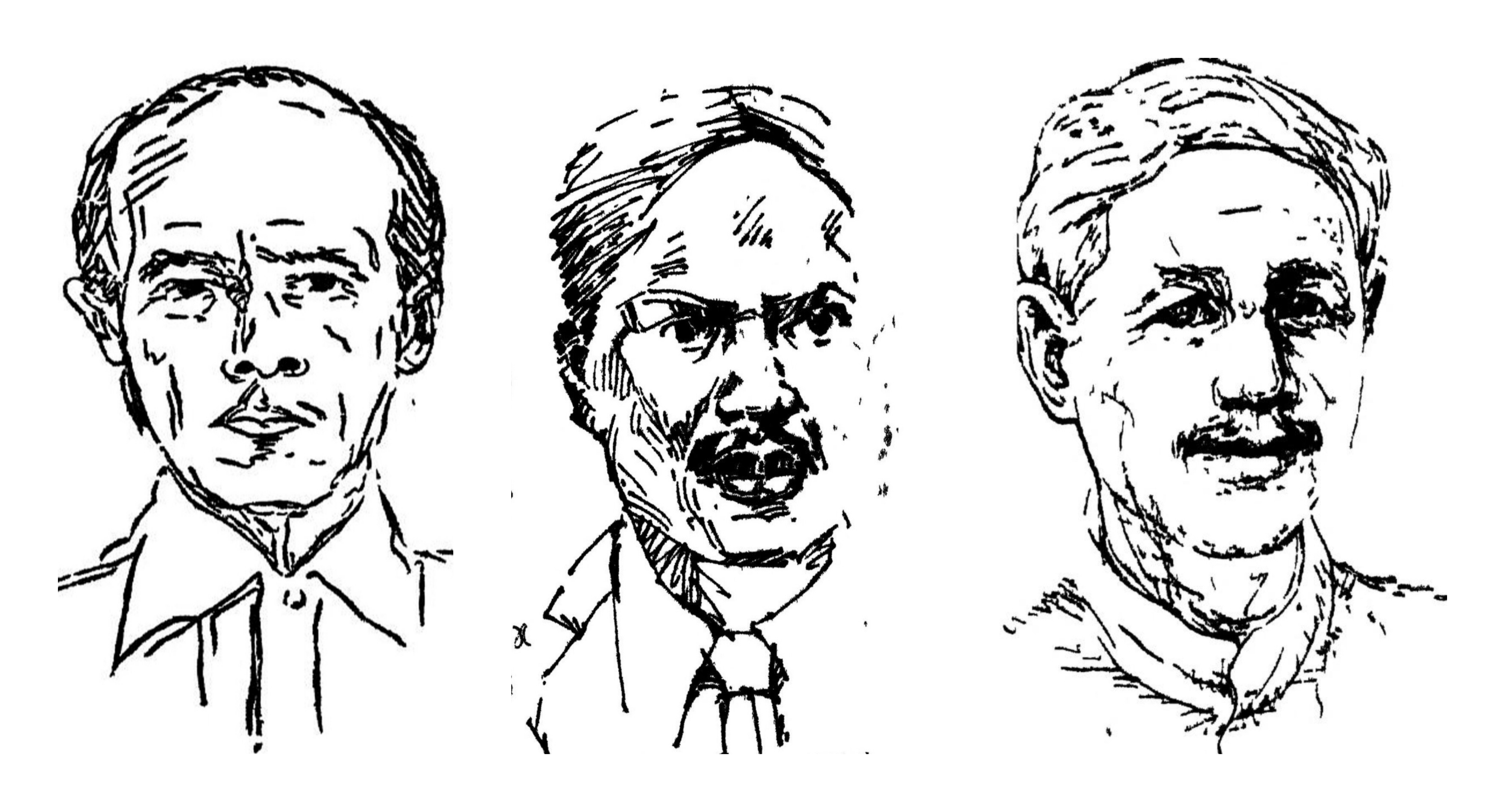
Chaoba, Kamal and Anganghal, the triumvirate of Modern Meitei literature (Contemporary Manipuri literature), including poetry, who were the pioneering male writers

== Pre World War II ==
Before World War II, modern Meitei literature began to take shape, mainly because of three important writers: Khwairakpam Chaoba (ꯈ꯭ꯋꯥꯏꯔꯥꯛꯄꯝ ꯆꯥꯎꯕ), Lamabam Kamal (ꯂꯃꯥꯕꯝ ꯀꯃꯜ), and Hijam Angahal (ꯍꯤꯖꯝ ꯑꯉꯥꯡꯍꯜ). Their writings helped people appreciate the beauty of their own language and sparked interest in Meitei literature, which had been neglected for years. These writers worked in many forms—poetry, novels, dramas, essays, and more.

=== Khwairakpam Chaoba Singh (1896–1950) ===
Chaoba (ꯆꯥꯎꯕ) was born in Imphal and passed his high school exams in Shillong in 1918. Though he was a smart student, he had to leave college in Kolkata due to illness and became a teacher. His job helped deepen his love for his mother tongue, Meitei language. He realized that earlier Meitei literature had once flourished but had now become inaccessible.

In his first poem, he praised the natural beauty of Manipur and expressed hope for new poets. He famously said, “Ignorant is he who speaks of the poverty of my mother tongue,” and this inspired others to write as well.

His poem Chhatra Macha (ꯁꯥꯇ꯭ꯔꯥ ꯃꯆꯥ) helped Manipuri gain recognition from Calcutta University. Although he wrote many prose works, his poetry is where he truly stood out. His poems were serious and well-structured. In his early poems, like “To a Flower on the Hill-Side” and “On Seeing the Lotus”, he reflected on death and the shortness of life. Later, his poems became more positive and celebrated nature and divine beauty, such as in “Mankind” and “Loktak Mapanda” (ꯂꯣꯛꯇꯥꯛ ꯃꯄꯥꯟꯗꯥ).

He was religious and often experienced emotional highs while worshipping Jagannath. His poems were influenced by traditional devotional songs but didn't fully succeed in bringing back old vocabulary.

=== Lamabam Kamal Singh (1899–1935) ===
Kamal (ꯀꯃꯜ), born in 1899, also passed his exams from Shillong in 1922. Though he wanted to study humanities, he was made to study medicine and became a doctor. He loved reading and was familiar with both English and Bengali literature.

If Chaoba is called a romantic poet, Kamal fits that label even more. He loved nature and wanted peace, often using beautiful Bengali words for his poem titles. His first poem, Abhinandan (ꯑꯚꯤꯅꯟꯗꯟ), celebrated the revival of Meitei literature. He often pointed out how people were ignoring their language and culture in favor of foreign ones.

In poems like “Silent Night” and “Solitude”, Kamal shows how he found deep meaning and wisdom in nature. He believed nature understood people better than other humans could. In “Universal Love”, he described love as powerful and beyond scientific understanding.

He didn't focus as much on form or rhythm like Chaoba or Angahal, but his poetry was musical and influenced by poets like Tagore.

=== Hijam Angahal Singh (1892–1951) ===
Angahal (ꯑꯉꯥꯡꯍꯜ) was the oldest of the three. He left school after class V due to poverty and worked as a petition writer in court. Despite little formal education, he had a strong command of his language and culture. He was a devout Vaishnava and a kind, humble man.

His short poems often talked about patriotism, devotion, and moral values. For example, in one poem, he mourned a fallen tree and ended with a lesson. Some poems were satirical, poking fun at pride or foolishness. Others dealt with serious themes like slavery, such as “Wa-Tannaba” (ꯋꯥ ꯇꯥꯟꯅꯕ) and “Meenai Luhongba” (ꯃꯤꯅꯥꯏ ꯂꯨꯍꯣꯡꯕ), which criticized a society that denied freedom even in marriage.

Angahal used a form of poetry called payar (rhymed 14-syllable couplets), but his poetry lacked the grace of Chaoba's or Kamal's.

His poetic story Shingel Indu (ꯁꯤꯡꯉꯦꯜ ꯏꯟꯗꯨ), set during the time of Maharaja Chandrakirti, tells the love story of Gopal and Indu, who grew up like siblings but fell in love. The story ends happily, but the emotional depth was not fully explored.

His greatest work, though, was the Khamba Thoibi Seireng (ꯈꯝꯕ ꯊꯣꯏꯕꯤ ꯁꯩꯔꯦꯡ), a massive epic with 34,000 lines. It mixed ancient and modern Meitei language words and told a dramatic tale using blank verse and payar. The story is full of tension, romance, war, and drama, based on traditional Meitei legends. His poetic skill and imagination made this his masterpiece.

=== Other Important Poets ===
Hawaibam Nabadwipchandra Singh (ꯍꯋꯥꯏꯕꯝ ꯅꯕꯗ꯭ꯋꯤꯕꯆꯟꯗ꯭ꯔ ꯁꯤꯡꯍ; 1897–1946) left school early but became a teacher and supported education. He translated Michael Madhusudan Dutt’s Meghanad Badh Kavya into Meitei, which earned him great praise, even though he didn't finish the full work.

Arambam Dorendrajit (ꯑꯔꯥꯝꯕꯝ ꯗꯣꯔꯦꯟꯗ꯭ꯔꯖꯤꯠ; 1907–1944) was dedicated to Meitei literature. His epic poem Kangsa Bodh (ꯀꯪꯁ ꯕꯣꯙ), written in Western style, is his most important work. Though inspired by Michael Dutt, Dorendrajit gave it his own touch. His language experiments were creative and he combined Indo-Aryan and local words. In his story, though Kangsa is the focus, Krishna becomes the true hero due to Dorendrajit's religious leanings.

=== Other Contributors ===
Hijam Irabot (ꯍꯤꯖꯝ ꯏꯔꯥꯕꯣꯠ); 1896–1951) started the first Manipuri literary journal Meitei Chanu (ꯃꯩꯇꯩ ꯆꯅꯨ) in 1922. A man of many talents, he is considered the first modern Meitei poet with his 1924 book Seidam Seireng (ꯁꯩꯗꯝ ꯁꯩꯔꯦꯡ).

A. Minaketan Singh (ꯑꯁꯥꯡꯕꯝ ꯃꯤꯅꯀꯦꯇꯟ ꯁꯤꯡꯍ; 1906–1995) wrote thoughtful poems often focused on the passing of time. His collection Basanta Seireng (ꯕꯁꯟꯇ ꯁꯩꯔꯦꯡ) was a school text for many years.

R.K. Shitaljit Singh (ꯔꯥꯖꯀꯨꯃꯥꯔ ꯁꯤꯇꯜꯖꯤꯠ ꯁꯤꯡꯍ; 1913–2007) was active in literary journals and wrote poems about devotion and patriotism.

== Post World War II ==
After World War II, some early Meitei literary figures had already passed away or stopped writing. Kamal and Anganghal died before and during the war. Chaoba, who lived until 1950, had stopped writing creatively by 1940. His last major work was Labanga Lata. He only wrote a few essays afterward.

Poets like A. Minaketan and R.K. Shitaljit continued to publish after the war, but their writing styles and ideas didn't change much, despite the war and the political/social upheavals. Their works, like Ketuki (ꯀꯦꯇꯨꯀꯤ), Eekhoulangba (ꯏꯈꯧꯂꯥꯡꯕ), and Vidyai Asirbad (ꯕꯤꯗ꯭ꯌꯥꯏ ꯑꯥꯁꯤꯔꯕꯥꯗ), felt more like they were written before the war, not reflecting the new world.

By this time, Manipur was going through political tension about whether it should join India. The rise of many political parties led to confusion and frustration among the people, especially the youth.

In 1949, E. Nilakanta Singh (ꯑꯦꯂꯥꯡꯕꯝ ꯅꯤꯂꯀꯥꯟꯇ ꯁꯤꯡꯍ), then a student, published the poem Manipur. It captured the uneasy mood of the time—global fears of nuclear war and local political instability. His poem was not very emotional but more intellectual, using images to express complex feelings. However, his later poetry didn't match the strength of Manipur.

=== Rise of a New Generation ===
Nilakanta's poem inspired a group of young poets who started expressing frustration with modern life. These poets were urban, educated, and experimental. They used symbols, modern language, and new poetic forms. At first, their poetry shocked readers, but people soon saw the truth in what they were saying.

Notable poets like Thangjam Ibopishak, R.K. Madhubir, and Yumlembam Ibomcha wrote poems expressing sadness, loss of faith, and frustration with modern society. They questioned traditional values, mocked outdated morals, and highlighted feelings of loneliness and disconnection. Their style broke away from emotional, romantic poetry of the past and instead used harsh, sometimes disturbing images to reflect reality.

They were influenced by Western literary movements like Imagism, Symbolism, Surrealism, and the works of T.S. Eliot. For example, Ibopishak's poems like Footpath, Dustbin, and Morgue and Sri Biren's Rotten Fish reflect this modern, raw style.

Poetry collections by these poets in the late 1960s and 70s marked a clear shift from the old, emotional, romantic style to a new, realistic, and sometimes cynical one.

=== Impact ===
Some critics feel these young poets tried too hard to be complex or shocking. Their poems could be hard to understand and focused too much on the darkness of life. But they were genuine in their effort and helped modern Meitei poetry grow up. Poetry was no longer about sweet emotions—it now talked about real life, struggles, and the human condition.

New poets were expected to be thoughtful and intelligent, to express their personal experiences, and to use strong, meaningful language and rhythm. The young poets succeeded in pushing Meitei poetry into a more modern direction.

=== Other Contributors ===
Other poets followed the modern trend but were less focused on society's problems. Examples include:

- Padmakumar Singh (ꯄꯗ꯭ꯃꯀꯨꯃꯥꯔ ꯁꯤꯡꯍ) – philosophical tone in Evening Song.
- Thiyam Ibohal Singh, Kangjam Ibohal Singh, Gurumayum Ranjit Sarma – poetic works in the late 1960s and 70s.

Laishram Somorendra Singh (ꯂꯥꯏꯁ꯭ꯔꯝ ꯁꯣꯃꯣꯔꯦꯟꯗ꯭ꯔꯣ ꯁꯤꯡꯍ), a senior poet, wrote satirical and witty poetry about society. His poems often looked cheerful on the surface but had deep meanings. For example, in Black Trousers, he shows how modern youth have lost direction.

He also criticized greedy businessmen and fake politicians, but in a humorous way. His major works include "The Lotus Blooms in the East" (ꯃꯃꯥꯡ ꯂꯩꯀꯥꯏ ꯊꯝꯕꯥꯜ ꯁꯥꯠꯂꯦ) and "The Story of a Village."

=== More Young Voices ===
Many other young poets also contributed to this new wave of poetry, such as:

Tokpam Ibomcha, Sagolsem Dhabal, Ratan Kumar Thiyam, Nabachandra Hamom, Brajakumar Sarma, Imo Meetei, and Ibempishak Devi. Their themes ranged from personal emotion to reflections on society and philosophy.

Notably, some poets were from outside Manipur (like in Assam's Cachar District), showing the spread of this literary movement.

=== Old Tradition Continues ===
While the new style took center stage, traditional poetry was still alive. Older poets like:

R.K. Surendrajit Singh, Khumanthem Ibohal, Minaketan Singh, and Nilbir Sastri continued writing in the older, more romantic and classical style.

Of them, R.K. Surendrajit (ꯔꯥꯖꯀꯨꯃꯥꯔ ꯁꯨꯔꯦꯟꯗ꯭ꯔꯖꯤꯠ) stood out. His poetry had rich language, hopeful themes, and influences from Tagore. He encouraged poets not to just dream, but to fight the problems of the real world. He believed both tradition and modernity could coexist.

Minaketan Singh (ꯃꯤꯅꯀꯦꯇꯟ ꯁꯤꯡꯍ), a respected figure, tried hard to create a unique style, but his poetry sometimes felt forced. He also translated major works from other languages, but his writing sometimes lacked emotional depth. Still, some of his short poems had real charm.

Others like Kalachand Sastri, Nilbir Sastri, and Sanjenbam Nodiachand also continued in the traditional path, though not always successfully.

== See also ==
- Ancient Meitei literature
  - Ancient Meitei hymns
  - Meitei ritual songs

== Bibliography ==
- A Catalogue of Manipuri Books, 1891–1969. India: The Parishad, 1970.
- Modern Indian Literature, an Anthology: Surveys and poems. India: Sahitya Akademi, 1992.
- Encyclopaedia of Indian Literature: Devraj to Jyoti. India: Sahitya Akademi, 1988.
