= Heisnam Kanhailal =

Indian theatre director (1941–2016)

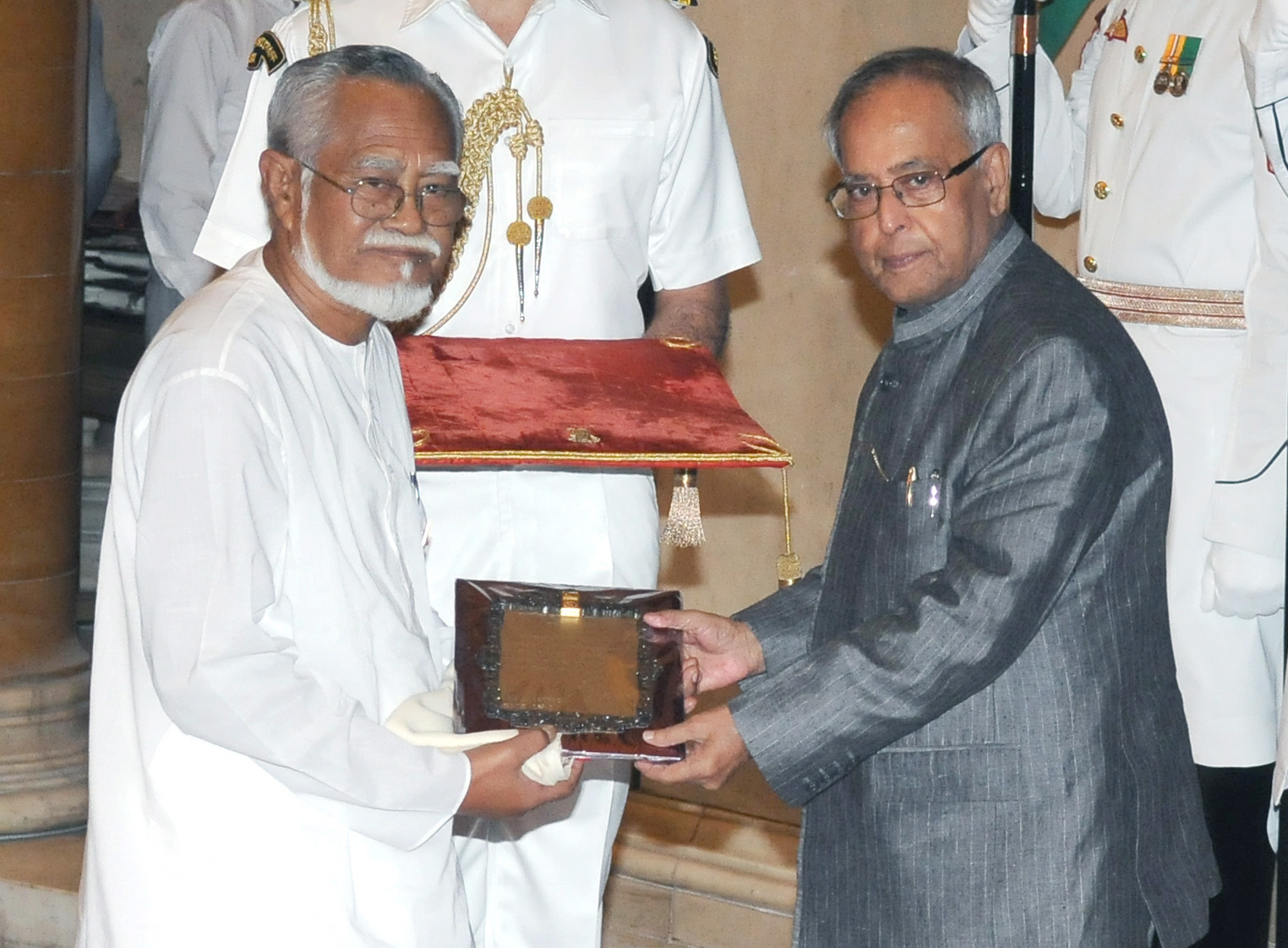
- Pranab Mukherjee presenting the Sangeet Natak Akademi Fellowship to Shri Heisnam Kanhailal, at the investiture ceremony of the Sangeet Natak Akademi Fellowships and Sangeet Natak Akademi Awards-2011, at Rashtrapati Bhavan
- Born: 17 January 1941; Manipur, India
- Died: 6 October 2016 (aged 75); Imphal, Manipur, India
- Occupation: Art theatre
- Spouse: Sabitri Heisnam

Heisnam Kanhailal (17 January 1941 – 6 October 2016) was an Indian art theatre personality. For his work, he was awarded the Padma Shri civilian award in 2004 and the Padma Bhushan civilian award in 2016 by the Government of India. He was the founder-director of Kalakshetra Manipur, a theatre laboratory established in 1969 that explores a new vocabulary in the existing language of theatre.

Kanhailal was born in Keisamthong Thangjam Lairak, Imphal.

Kanhailal was awarded the Sangeet Natak Akademi Award in Direction in 1985, given by the Sangeet Natak Akademi, India's National Academy of Music, Dance & Drama. In December 2011, he was awarded the Sangeet Natak Akademi Ratna Award, the highest ranked and most valued Akademi award.

Kanhailal was married to Sabitri Heisnam, his theatre associate and a fellow Padma Shri awardee. He died after an illness in Imphal on 6 October 2016.
