= Meitei monuments in Bangladesh =

Monuments of Meitei culture in Bangladesh

The Meitei people, during their settlement in Bangladesh, constructed numerous brick buildings and temples, particularly during the period of the Seven Years' Devastation (1819–1826).

== Royal monuments ==
=== Manipuri Rajbari (Palace of Gambhir Singh) ===
The Manipuri Rajbari, built by Meitei King Gambhir Singh during the Seven Years' Devastation, was established on a 60-acre area cleared from the Mirja forest. Several remnants of the palace, including one of the two original ponds, remain, although the pond used by the Meitei queens has since been filled in.

The palace complex, known as Sanggai-yumpham (meaning "palatial place" in Meitei), was surrounded by seven brick walls. Ruins of these walls are still visible in the area of Konung Leikai (also referred to as Manipuri Rajbari). The Sanathong (meaning "royal gate" in Meitei), which was multi-storied, had stairs on its western side, providing access to its upper level. The gate stands 4 meters tall and 4 meters wide. Two entrance gates are still visible in the existing wall, which measures 22 meters in length, 2.5 meters in height, and 50 cm in thickness. Portions of a rear exit gate also remain intact. The construction materials included bricks of varying sizes, with a special mixture called surki (composed of brick powder, limestone, molasses, and black gram powder) used for binding.

These structural remnants continue to stand in the Konung Leikai area.

=== Marjit's Monument ===
It is believed to mark the settlement of Meitei King Marjit Singh Maharaja at Humerjan in Bhanugach, located in the Moulvibazar district, which is known as Konung Leikai by the Meiteis. Some remnants of brick walls and houses are still visible today. The remains of the house attributed to Marjit consist of six rooms, with a total area of 15 meters in breadth and 21 meters in length. The crumbling walls of the house are 50 cm thick and are situated on the western side of Rani Bazar.

=== Tombs of Marjit and Devendra's graveyards ===
The tomb of Marjit Singh Maharaja is located one kilometer from his residence, at a site called Jamina Khutningthek (Jamina Corner), situated on the western bank of the Dhalai River. The tomb's structure resembles that of the Pakhangba temple.

Around 1980, the tomb was discovered to be buried under sand due to flooding. Nearby, the tomb of Devendra Maharaja, also known as Dhaka-taba, is located next to Marjit Maharaja's tomb. This tomb, too, is covered with sand.

=== Royal Gate of Maharaja Gambhir Singh ===
In 2012, the Mutua Museum in Keishampat repaired a royal gate of Maharaja Gambhir Singh in Bangladesh. Gambhir Singh began building a palace complex by clearing a 600-acre forest called Mirza Jungle in Sylhet around 1824. The early work included building a palace, a royal gate, a large pond, and marking ritual sites, but the complex is still in ruins today. Excavations were done in the 1980s, as this work was not possible before 1971, when Bangladesh was part of East Pakistan.

== Religious monuments ==
=== Traditional Meitei religion ===
In proximity to the Meitei royal palace, at Lamabazar, three temples dedicated to traditional Meitei deities—Pakhangba, Yumjao Lairembi, and Nongshaba—are located opposite the present-day Madan Mohan College.

These temples are situated on a brick platform with dimensions of 15.5 meters in breadth, 37 meters in length, and 90 cm in thickness. These temples face the southern direction.

==== Temple of Pakhangba ====
Among them, the Lainingthou Pakhangba temple is the largest and tallest, standing at a height of 24 meters. The temple consists of three main sections:

1. The foundation (base) of the temple.
2. The sanctum housing the idol.
3. The conical portion of the roof, which slopes at an angle of 75 degrees.

The temple's footprint measures 8.5 meters by 8.5 meters, with uniform structural design on all four sides. The entrance door is 2 meters wide and 3 meters high, adorned with low-relief carvings of a peacock, the moon, and the sun. The eastern wall features reliefs of the moon, horse, and cow. Further reliefs representing Pakhangba's Paphal are depicted below these decorations. The north-western side of the temple remains undecorated. Approximately three meters to the left of the Lainingthou Pakhangba temple lies the temple of Yumjao Lairembi.

==== Temple of Yumjao Lairembi ====
The Yumjao Lairembi temple shares a similar structure to the Lainingthou Pakhangba temple. It measures 6.4 meters in breadth, 6 meters in length, and 18.5 meters in height. The door has dimensions of 1.4 meters in width and 2.5 meters in height. The temple's four walls are unadorned. Located approximately three meters to the left of the Yumjao Lairembi temple is the Lainingthou Nongsaba temple.

==== Temple of Nongsaba ====
The Lainingthou Nongsaba temple shares several similarities with the Yumjao Lairembi temple. The temple has unadorned walls, and its dimensions are 6.5 meters in both length and breadth, with a height of 17 meters.

The decorative elements found on the base structure and walls of these temples resemble those on the Canchipur Palace gate of Manipur, which was the capital of King Gambhir Singh. The origins of the three deities housed within these temples remain difficult to trace. Decorative patterns were present on the temple structures until 1981. Renovations carried out by generous individuals have resulted in a loss of the temple's original appearance.

=== Hinduism ===
==== Narasingha Akhara ====
The Narasingha Akhara, associated with Maharaja Nara Singh, the then ruler of Manipur, is believed to have been the site of a Jagannath temple at Narasingha Tila, a small hill covering an area of 7 acres. A Meitei settlement is located nearby. Until 1981, base structures of the temple could be seen, though no traces remain today. The temple faces south, and its structure aligns with that of the mandav, which faces it.

The temple measures 10.85 meters in length and 9.42 meters in breadth, while the mandav has dimensions of 12 meters in length and 11 meters in breadth, supported by 12 pillars. To the left of the Jagannath temple, two smaller shrines, each with similar structures, measure 2.3 meters in breadth and 2.5 meters in length. Fifteen meters to the east of the temple and mandav, there is a service house for temple attendants. The house faces west and measures 5.25 meters in breadth and 12 meters in length.

== Proposed monument ==
The United Committee Manipur (UCM) submitted a memorandum to the Chief Minister of Manipur, requesting the construction of a statue of Maharaja Gambhir Singh at Rajbhari, Sylhet, Bangladesh, and a museum dedicated to Maharaja Marjit Singh at Kamalganj, Moulvi Bazar, Bangladesh.

== Related pages ==
- Meitei architecture
- Meitei language in Bangladesh
- Meitei language festival
- Bangladesh Manipuri Sahitya Sangsad
