= Manipur State Kala Akademi =

Cultural organization in Manipur

- ꯃꯅꯤꯄꯨꯔ ꯁ꯭ꯇꯦꯠ ꯀꯂꯥ ꯑꯦꯀꯥꯗꯦꯃꯤ
- The Akademi works under the Department of Art and Culture of the Government of Manipur.
- Formation: 1972
- Type: Autonomous cultural organization
- Headquarters: Imphal, Manipur, India
- Region served: Manipur
- Parent organization: Department of Art and Culture, Government of Manipur
- Website: mska.mn.gov.in

The Manipur State Kala Akademi (MSKA) (Note: written in the Meetei Mayek script (official script of the state's administration) as "ꯃꯅꯤꯄꯨꯔ ꯁ꯭ꯇꯦꯠ ꯀꯂꯥ ꯑꯦꯀꯥꯗꯦꯃꯤ".) is an autonomous cultural organization established by the Government of Manipur. Founded in 1972, the Akademi serves as the apex body for the promotion, preservation, and development of Manipuri literature, fine arts, dance, music, theatre, and other cultural traditions within the state of Manipur, India. It coordinates cultural activities across both the valley and hill regions of the state. It is a composite regional version of three national bodies, namely Sahitya Akademi, Sangeet Natak Akademi and Lalit Kala Akademi.

== History ==
The Manipur State Kala Akademi was established in 1972 under the registration of societies act, functioning under the aegis of the Department of Art and Culture, Government of Manipur. The institution was modeled after national academies like the Sahitya Akademi, Sangeet Natak Akademi and Lalit Kala Akademi to address the specific documentation and promotional needs of Manipur's diverse ethnic art forms.

== Objectives and activities ==
The primary mandate of the Manipur State Kala Akademi includes the preservation of traditional art forms and the encouragement of contemporary creative expressions. Its institutional activities include:

- Documentation and Research: Recording, filming, and archiving rare and endangered folk, ethnic, and classical art forms of Manipur, including Lai Haraoba, Thang-Ta (martial arts), and various ethnic dances.
- Exhibitions and Festivals: Organizing state-level and regional exhibitions for fine arts, photography, and sculpture, alongside annual festivals, for traditional Meitei theatre (such as Shumang Leela), music, and dance.
- Literary Promotion: Conducting seminars, symposia, and workshops to support Manipuri literature (literary works of Meitei language) and the languages of different communities within the state.
- Inter-State Cultural Exchange: Collaborating with national bodies like the Sangeet Natak Akademi, Sahitya Akademi, and Lalit Kala Akademi to sponsor local troupes and artists for national exhibitions and cultural programs outside the state.

== Awards and honors ==
The Akademi recognizes artistic merit and lifelong dedication to Manipuri culture, through an annual system of awards:

- Manipur State Kala Akademi Award: Conferred upon senior artists, gurus, and scholars for outstanding contributions to the fields of dance, music, theatre, literature, and fine arts.
- MSKA Young Talent Award: Instituted to recognize and encourage promising young artists in various cultural disciplines.
- Fellowships: Awarded to eminent personalities for lifetime achievement and profound research in the cultural history of the region.

== See also ==
- State Level Committee for declaration of Manipuri Language as Classical Language of India
- Manipur State Literature Awards
- Directorate of Language Planning and Implementation
- Manipur State Museum
- Kangla
- Manipuri Sahitya Parishad
- Manipuri Literary and Cultural Forum, Tripura
- Bangladesh Manipuri Sahitya Sangsad
