= Vikaspedia =

Indian Government online encyclopedia

- Website type: Information and knowledge portal
- Owner: Government of India
- Website: vikaspedia.in
- Launched: 18 February 2014; 12 years ago

Vikaspedia is an Indian online encyclopaedia, launched by the Government of India. The website was implemented by C-DAC Hyderabad and is run by the Department of Electronics and Information Technology, Ministry of Communications and Information Technology. It is built as a portal for the social sectors, and offers information in 23 languages: English, Assamese, Telugu, Hindi, Bengali, Gujarati, Kannada, Malayalam, Tamil, Bodo, Dogri, Sanskrit, Kashmiri, Konkani, Nepali, Odia, Urdu, Maithili, Meitei, Santali, Sindhi, Punjabi, and Marathi.

It was started on 18 February 2014 and has information in the domains of Agriculture, Health, Education, Social Welfare, Energy and e-Governance. The name of the portal is a portmanteau of the words Vikas (Sanskrit for "Development") and encyclopedia. The portal provides information in local languages in all six given sectors.
