= Manipuri culture =

Manipuri culture may refer to:

- Meitei culture, the culture of Meitei people, the predominant ethnic group of Manipur
- Overall multiethnic culture of Manipur
