= Meitei language in Bangladesh =

- Manipuri language in Bangladesh
- Meiteilon/Manipuri lon Meitei: ꯕꯥꯡꯂꯥꯗꯦꯁꯇ ꯃꯩꯇꯩꯂꯣꯟ/বাংলাদেশতা মৈতৈলোন, Meitei: ꯕꯥꯡꯂꯥꯗꯦꯁꯇ ꯃꯅꯤꯄꯨꯔꯤ ꯂꯣꯟ/বাংলাদেশতা মণিপুরী লোন
- Meitei Lon (Meitei for 'Meitei language') written in Meitei script and Bengali script
- Native to: Sylhet District; Moulvibazar District; Sunamganj District; Habiganj District
- Region: Sylhet Division
- Ethnicity: Meitei people
- Native speakers: 15,000
- Language family: Sino-Tibetan: Central Tibeto-Burman?; Kuki-Chin–Naga?; Meitei; Meitei language in Bangladesh
- Standard forms: Standard Meitei (Standard Manipuri)
- Writing system: Meitei script and Bengali script

Official status
- Recognised minority language in: Bangladesh
- Development body: Manipuri Language Research and Development Organisation, Bangladesh; Bangladesh Manipuri Sahitya Sangsad; Manipur Cultural Complex, Bangladesh; Manipuri Muslim Samaj Kalyan Parishad; Bangladesh Manipuri Muslim Education Trust

Language codes
- ISO 639-2: mni
- ISO 639-3: mni

The Meitei language (Meitei: ꯃꯩꯇꯩ ꯂꯣꯟ/মৈতৈ লোন, romanized: Meitei Lon), or Manipuri language (Meitei: ꯃꯅꯤꯄꯨꯔꯤ ꯂꯣꯟ/মণিপুরী লোন, romanized: Manipuri Lon), is a minority language in Bangladesh. It is spoken by around 15,000 ethnic Manipuris, mainly concentrated in the Sylhet Division. The Meitei language is also a second language for Bishnupriyas in Bangladesh.

Due to a shrinking population, many Manipuris in Sylhet do not speak the Meitei language fluently, as they make more use of the majority Bengali language, and may speak with a Bangladeshi accent.

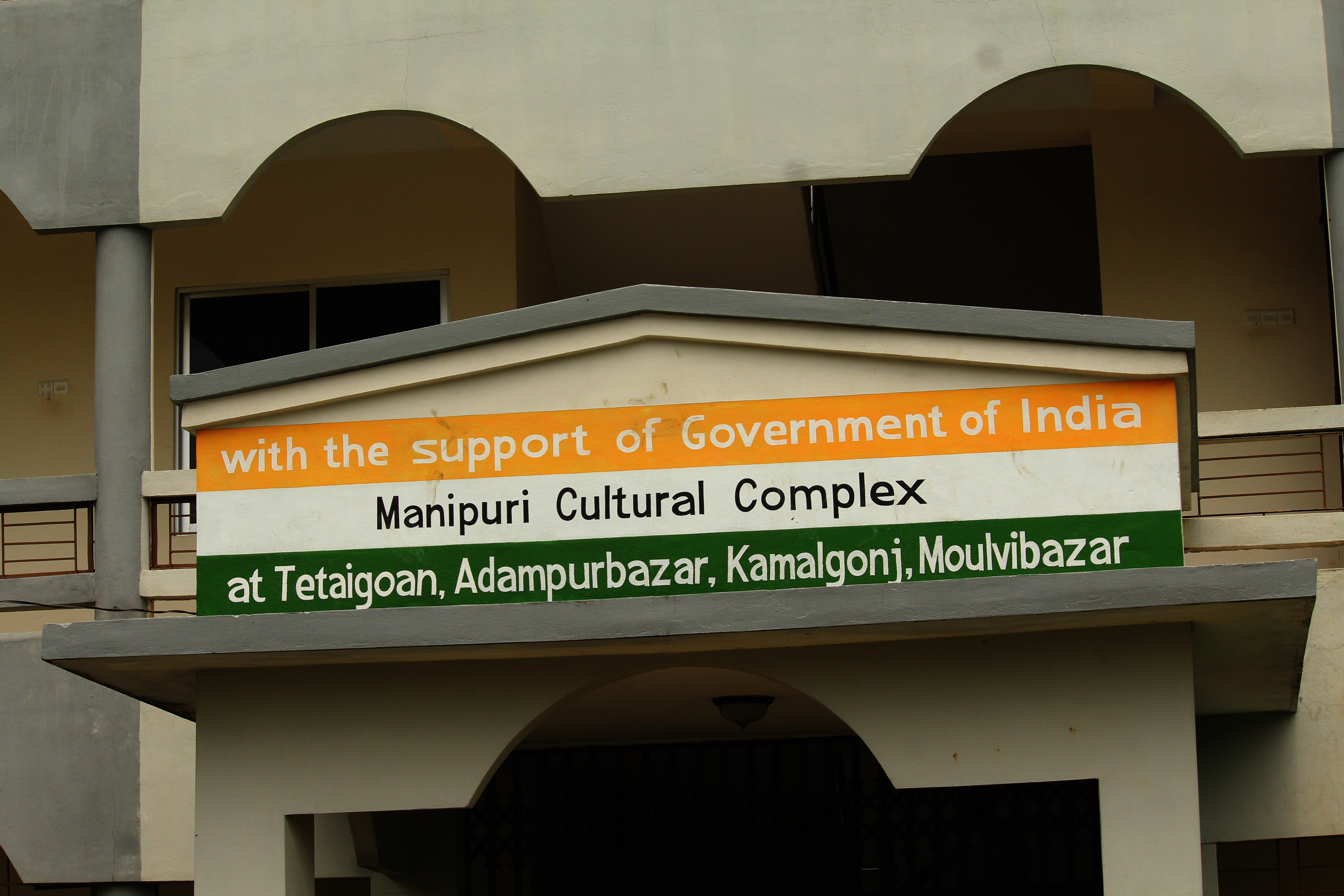
The Manipuri Cultural Complex works for the development of the Meitei language in Bangladesh.

Associations and organizations including the Manipuri Language Research and Development Organisation, Bangladesh, the Bangladesh Manipuri Sahitya Sangsad, and the Manipur Cultural Complex work for the development of the Manipuri language, literature, and culture in Bangladesh.

== Intelligibility with Indian Meitei ==
Regarding the similarities and differences between the Bangladeshi Meitei language and Indian Meitei language, Ethnologue says the following:

“Intelligibility of Meitei in Bangladesh is difficult. Those in Bangladesh may understand India Meitei better than vice versa possibly due to more language change in Bangladesh over the years. India Meitei is more standard. Intelligibility between dialects in Bangladesh definitely sufficient to understand complex and abstract discourse. Lexical similarity: 80%–86% between dialects in Bangladesh, 65%–70% between Bangladesh and India varieties.”

— Ethnologue

== Geographical distribution ==
Areas where there is significant population of Meitei speakers (Manipuris) in Bangladesh

The population of Meitei speakers (Manipuris) are found in four districts, namely Sylhet District, Moulvibazar District, Sunamganj District and Habiganj District of the Sylhet Division of Bangladesh. In early times, there were Meitei speaking population in Dhaka, Mymensingh and Comilla also.

=== Sylhet district ===
There are thirteen villages in Sylhet District, which are Amborkhana (Nongthombam Leikai in Meitei language), Nayabazar, Shibgonj, Goaipara, Kewapara, Sagordighirpar (Pukhri Mapan in Meitei language), Baghbari, Laladighipar (Sapam Leikai in Meitei language), Lamabazar (Leichom Leikai in Meitei language), Doxingach, Rajbari (Konung Leikai in Meitei language), Brojonath Tila (Meitei people refer to it as Brajanath Leikai but earlier it was known as Narasingh Tila) and Noyabazar (Sylhet P.S.) among others.

=== Mouluvibazar district ===
Moulvibazar District has twenty-eight Meitei populated settlements, which are Photiguli, Goalbari, Naldhari, Boroiloli (Kulaura P.S.), Ramnagar, Khaspur, Balishira (Shrimongol P.S.), Gouranagar, Puthadhor, Chotodhamai, Patharia, Gourangabil (Borolekha P.S.), Madhobpur, Chaiciri (Nongthombam Leikai in Meitei language), Homerjan, Majhergaon, Shangaon (Hamom Khul in Meitei language), Haqtiarkhola, Shripiire, Bhandarigaon, Chitlia, Noyapattan, Ganganagar, Bhanubil, Katabil Tateygaon (Mange Makhong Khul in Meitei language), Mongolpur (Haobam Leikai in Meitei language), Konagoan (Kamalgonj P.S.), among others.

=== Habiganj district ===
Habigonj District (Chunarghat P.S.) had four Meitei settlement areas, which are Gaborkhula, Abadgaon, Shibnagar and Dudhpatil.

=== Sunamganj district ===
Sunamgonj District (Chatak P.S.) has three Meitei populated settlements, which are Nayanpur, Lakhat and Ratanpur.

== Meitei language festival ==
The Manipuri language festival (Meitei: ꯃꯅꯤꯄꯨꯔꯤ ꯂꯣꯟꯒꯤ ꯀꯨꯝꯃꯩ or মণিপুরী লোনগী কুম্মৈ, romanized: Manipuri Lon-gi Kummei), (Bengali: মণিপুরী ভাষা উৎসব, romanized: Manipuri Bhasha Utsav), is an annual cultural event that aims to the protect and develop the Meitei language, Meitei writing system, and Meitei culture in Bangladesh. The event has been conducted by the Bangladesh Manipuri Sahitya Sangsad (Meitei: ꯕꯥꯡꯂꯥꯗꯦꯁ ꯃꯅꯤꯄꯨꯔꯤ ꯁꯥꯍꯤꯇ꯭ꯌ ꯁꯪꯁꯗ or বাংলাদেশ মণিপুরী সাহিত্য সংসদ) since 2008.

== Manipuri Language Day ==
Manipuri language day (Meitei: ꯃꯅꯤꯄꯨꯔꯤ ꯂꯣꯟꯒꯤ ꯅꯨꯃꯤꯠ/মণিপুরী লোনগী নুমীৎ, romanized: Manipuri Lon-gi Numit), is celebrated on 20 August, both Bangladesh and India,. (Note: In India, Manipuri Language Day celebrates the inclusion of the Meitei language in the Eighth Schedule to the Constitution of India, making it one of the official languages of the Indian Republic) In 2022, it was organised by the Manipuri Language Research and Development Organisation, Bangladesh at Manipuri Kangshang, Nayapatand in Bhanugharh in Moulvibazar District, attended by the Indian delegates alongside the notable linguistic personalities of Bangladesh, including professor Amar Yumnam of Manipur University (MU), professor Dr Homen Thangjam of the Indira Gandhi National Open University (IGNOU), professor Jinen Laishramcha of the University of Seoul, South Korea and members of the Manipur Cultural Complex, Bangladesh and the Manipuri Language Research and Development Organisation, Bangladesh.

The slogan for the event of the year 2022 was "Lets speak our mother tongue, write in our mother tongue, love our mother tongue."

== International Manipuri Short Story Festival in Bangladesh ==
The International Manipuri Short Story Festival is a 3-day international linguistic event, jointly organised by the "Bangladesh Manipuri Sahitya Sangsad" (Meitei: ꯕꯥꯡꯂꯥꯗꯦꯁ ꯃꯅꯤꯄꯨꯔꯤ ꯁꯥꯍꯤꯇ꯭ꯌ ꯁꯪꯁꯗ/বাংলাদেশ মণিপুরী সাহিত্য সংসদ) of Sylhet and the "Manipuri Short Story Society" of India. In December 2022, it was organised at the Zilla Parishad conference hall in Sylhet, Bangladesh. On its first day, there was bestowing of "Sinam Tanubabu Memorial International Award 2022" to Mutum Ramani Devi, an Indian authoress from Manipur, in recognition of her literary work named “Fongngamdraba Cheinakhol” (Meitei: ꯐꯣꯡꯉꯝꯗ꯭ꯔꯕ ꯆꯩꯅꯥꯈꯣꯜ/ফোংঙমদ্রবা চৈনাখোল), which is an anthology of Meitei language short stories. AK Seram, a Bangladeshi author, received the "Lifetime Achievement Award of the Manipuri Short Story Society, India" ("Rajkumar Sitaljit Memorial Award"). In the event, 26 Indian writers (predominantly from Manipur and Assam), alongside the numerous Bangladeshi writers, attended and presented their literary works in the symposium of the event.

== Meitei cinema ==
=== In Dhaka international film festival ===
In the Dhaka International Film Festival 2022, a Meitei language feature film Pandam Amada (Meitei: ꯄꯥꯟꯗꯝ ꯑꯃꯗ/পান্দম অমদা), directed by an Indian National award-winning filmmaker Oinam Gautam (Meitei: ꯑꯣꯏꯅꯥꯝ ꯒꯧꯇꯝ/ওইনাম গৌতম), was premiered.

=== Indo-Bangladeshi Meitei language films ===
Bangladeshki Sana Tampha (Meitei: ꯕꯥꯡꯂꯥꯗꯦꯁꯀꯤ ꯁꯅꯥ ꯇꯝꯐꯥ/বাংলাদেশকী সনা তমফা) is the first Indo-Bangladeshi Meitei language film. Released in 2022, it portrays the life of the Meitei people in Bangladesh, starring Indian Meitei actors, including Gurumayum Bonny, Abenao Elangbam, among others.

=== In the Liberation Docfest Bangladesh ===
In the 8th Liberation Docfest Bangladesh 2020, a 52-minute documentary Meitei language film "Highways of Life", directed and written by Amar Maibam, won the "Best Film" award. It is the only Indian film & second from Asia to be selected from 1,800 films, against seven documentaries from Belgium, Slovenia, Germany, Argentina, UK, Italy and Iran, in the event.

== Publications of books ==
Name of the book(s)		Romanization(s)	Author(s)	Year of publication	Note(s)
In Meitei script	In Eastern Nagari script	Romanization(s)	Author(s)	Year of publication	Note(s)
ꯅꯨꯃꯤꯗꯥꯡꯋꯥꯏꯔꯝꯒꯤ ꯆꯤꯒꯣꯡꯂꯩ	নুমিদাংৱাইরমগী চিগোংলৈ	Numidangwairamgee Chigonglei	AK Seram	2023	
ꯄꯟꯊꯨꯡ ꯇꯝꯅ	পন্থুং তমনা	Panthung Tamna		2022	

== See also ==
- Meitei classical language movement
- Meitei linguistic purism movement
- Meitei poetry day (Manipuri poetry day)
- Meitei associate official language movement
- Meitei scheduled language movement
