= Meitei language =

Tibeto-Burman language of India

Meitei
- Manipuri, (Note: used in official accounts) Meetei, (Note: used in traditionalist and revivalist accounts) Meithei (Note: used in British and some Western accounts)
- ꯃꯩꯇꯩꯂꯣꯟ মৈতৈলোন • Meiteilon
- Meitei Lon written in Meitei script
- Pronunciation: [mejtej loːn]
- Native to: India, Bangladesh
- Region: Manipur, Assam, Tripura
- Ethnicity: Meitei
- Native speakers: 1.8 million (2003–2011)
- Language family: Sino-Tibetan: Central Tibeto-Burman?; Kuki-Chin–Naga?; Meitei
- Early forms: Proto-Sino-Tibetan: Proto-Tibeto-Burman?; Ancient Meitei; Medieval Meitei
- Standard forms: Standard Manipuri (Standard Meitei)
- Dialects: Imphal (standard dialect); Thougallon (royal court register); Amailon (liturgical); Kakching (southeastern regional); Kwatha (hilly regional); Khuman (historical); Moirang (historical); Chakpa Phayeng (northwestern regional); Andro (northeastern regional); Khurkhul (northwestern regional); Sekmai (northern regional); Meitei Pangal; Bangladeshi Meitei
- Writing system: Meetei Mayek; Naoriya Phulo; Bengali-Assamese script; Latin alphabet (unofficial)

Official status
- Official language in: India (scheduled official); Manipur (main official); Assam (additional official)
- Recognised minority language in: Tripura, India; Bangladesh; Myanmar
- Regulated by: Directorate of Language Planning and Implementation, Manipur
- Development body: Ministry of Culture (India); Sahitya Akademi; Central Institute of Indian Languages; Directorate of Language Planning and Implementation; Manipuri Sahitya Parishad

Language codes
- ISO 639-2: mni
- ISO 639-3: mni
- Glottolog: mani1292 Manipuri
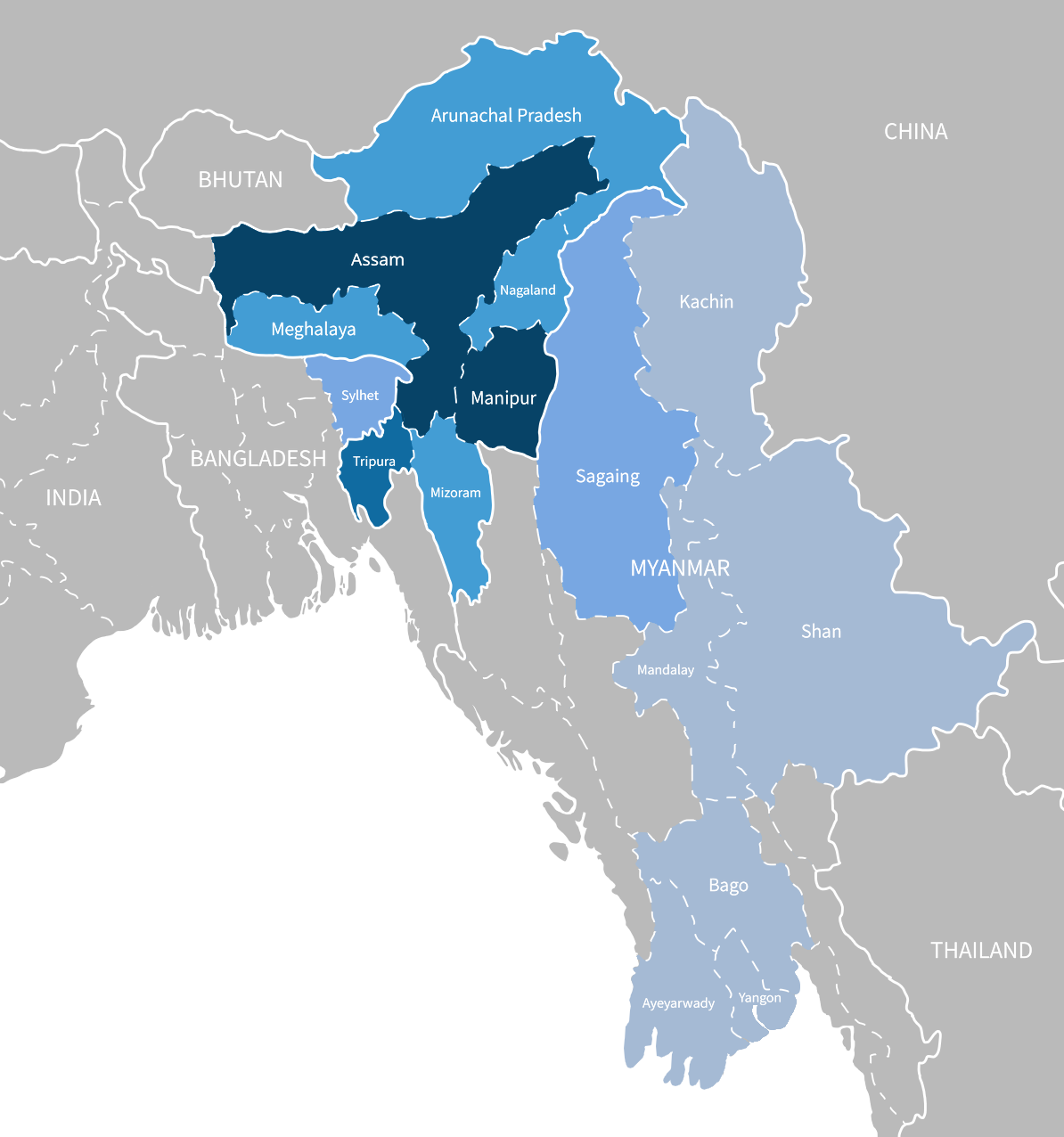
- Regions where Meitei is official and educational language Regions where Meitei is recognised and educational language but not official Regions where Meitei is not recognised and not official but educational Regions where Meitei is recognised but not official and educational Regions with significant Meitei speaking minorities

Meitei (/ˈmeɪteɪ/; ꯃꯩꯇꯩꯂꯣꯟ pronounced [mejtejlon]), also known as Manipuri (ꯃꯅꯤꯄꯨꯔꯤ pronounced [mənipuɾi]), is a Tibeto-Burman language of northeast India. It is the official language and the lingua franca of Manipur and an additional official language in four districts of Assam. It is one of the constitutionally scheduled official languages of the Indian Republic. Meitei is the most widely-spoken Tibeto-Burman language of India and the third most widely spoken language of northeast India after Assamese and Bengali. There are 1.76 million Meitei native speakers in India according to the 2011 census, 1.52 million of whom are found in the state of Manipur, where they represent the majority of its population. There are smaller communities in neighbouring Indian states, such as Assam (168,000), Tripura (24,000), Nagaland (9,500), and elsewhere in the country (37,500). The language is also spoken by smaller groups in neighbouring Myanmar and Bangladesh.

Meitei and Gujarati jointly hold the third place among the fastest growing languages of India, following Hindi and Kashmiri.

Meitei is not endangered: its status has been assessed as safe by Ethnologue (where it is assigned to EGIDS level 2 "provincial language"). However, it is considered vulnerable by UNESCO.

Imphal dialect, also known as Standard Manipuri, is the standard dialect of Meitei language, and is natively spoken in Imphal, the capital city of Manipur state, and around the Greater Imphal administrative zone, and is used in administration, education, media, literature, widely across the state and abroad.

Meitei serves as the lingua sacra (holy and sacred language) of Sanamahism, the indigenous religion of Manipur, through its liturgical register, Amailon, which is used in the traditional rites and rituals of Sanamahists.

The Manipuri language is associated with the Ningthouja dynasty (Mangangs), the Khuman dynasty, the Moirangs, the Angoms, the Luwangs, the Chengleis (Sarang-Leishangthems), and the Khaba-Nganbas. Each had their respective distinct dialects and were politically independent from one another. Later, all of them fell under the dominion of the Ningthouja dynasty, changing their status of being independent "ethnicities" into those of "clans" of the collective Meitei community. The Ningthouja dialect was predominant, and received heavy influences from the speech forms of the other groups.

Meitei is one of the advanced literary languages recognised by Sahitya Akademi, India's National Academy of Letters.

Meitei is the only non-tribal Indian language in the Sino–Tibetan language family. It is the only Sino-Tibetan language of India whose literary tradition was established before colonial times.

The use of writing systems in Tibeto-Burman languages appears to be very restricted. Meitei (or Manipuri) is one of four Tibeto-Burman languages with an old written tradition (the other three being Tibetan, Burmese, and Newar).

== Classification ==
Meitei belongs to the Tibeto-Burman branch of the Sino-Tibetan languages.

During the 19th and 20th centuries, different linguists tried to assign Meitei to various sub-groups. Early classifier George Abraham Grierson (1903–1924) put it in Kuki-Chin, Vegelin and Voegelin (1965) in Kuki-Chin-Naga, and Benedict (1972) in Kuki-Naga. Robbins Burling has suggested that Meitei belongs to none of those groups. Current academic consensus agrees with James Matisoff in placing Manipuri in its own subdivision of the Kamarupan group—a geographic rather than a genetic grouping. However, some still consider Meitei to be a member of the Kuki-Chin-Naga branch.

== History ==
The Meitei language has existed for at least 2000 years. According to linguist Suniti Kumar Chatterjee, the ancient Meitei literature dates back to 1500 to 2000 years before present.

=== First Millennium CE ===
The earliest known Meitei language compositions is the ritual song Ougri (ꯑꯧꯒ꯭ꯔꯤ), which was used in religious and coronation ceremonies of Kangleipak. It may have existed before the Common Era. Numit Kappa (Meitei: ꯅꯨꯃꯤꯠ ꯀꯥꯞꯄ, lit. 'The Shooting of the Sun'), a religious epic that tells the tale of how the night was divided from the day, was also composed in the first century.

Poireiton Khunthok (Meitei: ꯄꯣꯢꯔꯩꯇꯣꯟ ꯈꯨꯟꯊꯣꯛ, lit. 'The Immigration of Poireiton') is a 3rd-century narrative work describing the establishment of a colony in Kangleipak by a group of immigrants led by Poireiton, the younger brother of the god of the underworld.

The Yumbanlol, a copper plate manuscript was composed in the 6th or 7th century CE for the royal family of Kangleipak. It is a rare work of dharmashastra, covering sexuality, the relationships between husbands and wives, and instructions on how to run a household.

The Khencho (ꯈꯦꯟꯆꯣ), an early Meitei work of poetry was composed by the beginning of the 7th century CE. Although it is obscure and unintelligible to present-day Meiteis, it is still recited as part of the Lai Haraoba festival.

One of the best-preserved early Meitei language epigraphic records is a copper plate inscription dating to the reign of King Khongtekcha (r. c. 763 – 773 CE). During the same time period, Akoijam Tombi composed the Panthoibi Khonggul (ꯄꯥꯟꯊꯣꯏꯄꯤ ꯈꯣꯡꯀꯨꯜ), an account of the romantic adventures of the deified Meitei princess Panthoibi.

=== Second Millennium CE ===
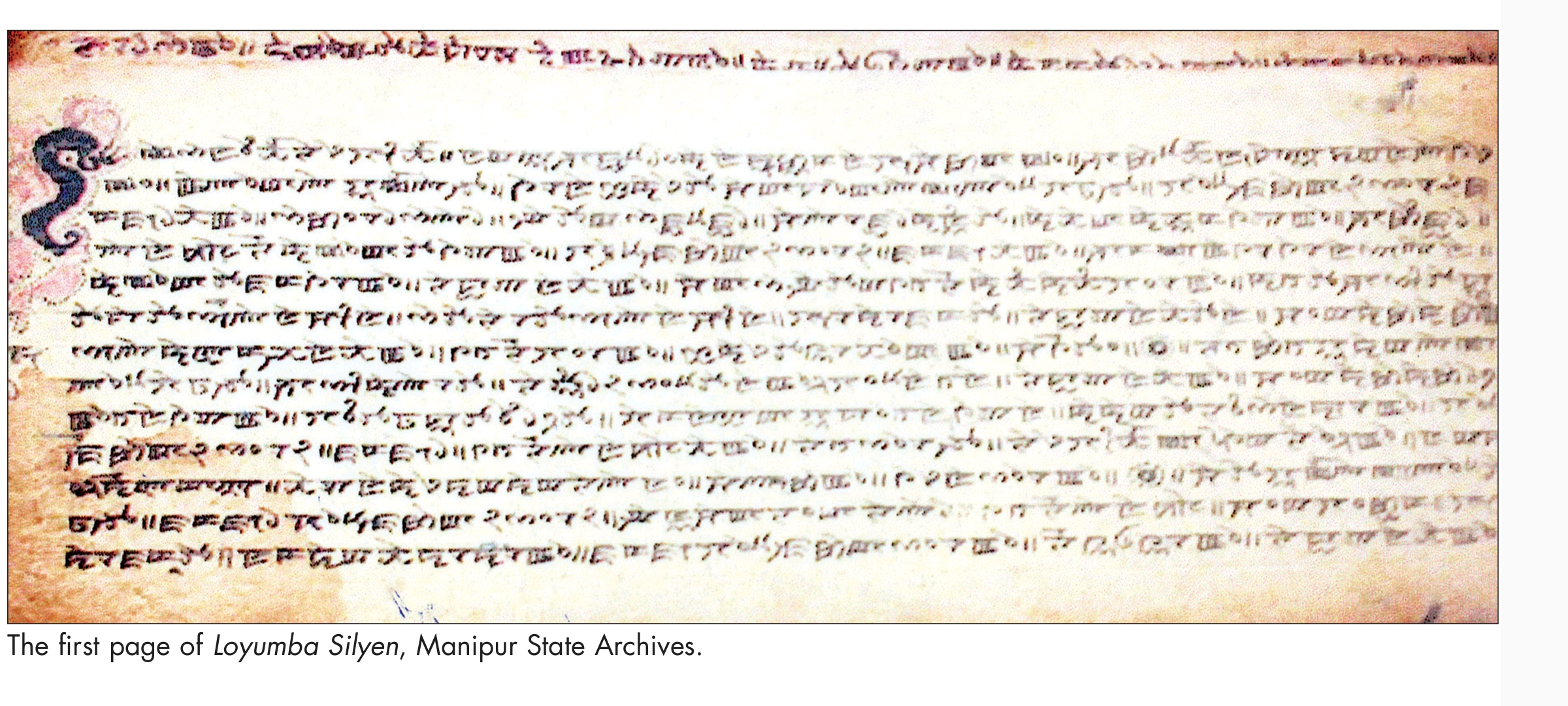
The first page of Loyumba Shinyen, the 11th-12th century Meitei-language constitution of Kangleipak.

In 1100 CE, a written constitution, Meitei: ꯂꯣꯏꯌꯨꯝꯄ ꯁꯤꯜꯌꯦꯜ, romanized: Loyumba Shinyen, was finalised by King Loiyumba (r. c. 1074 – 1112 CE) of Kangleipak. It was a codification of the proto-constitution drafted by King Naophangba in 429 CE.

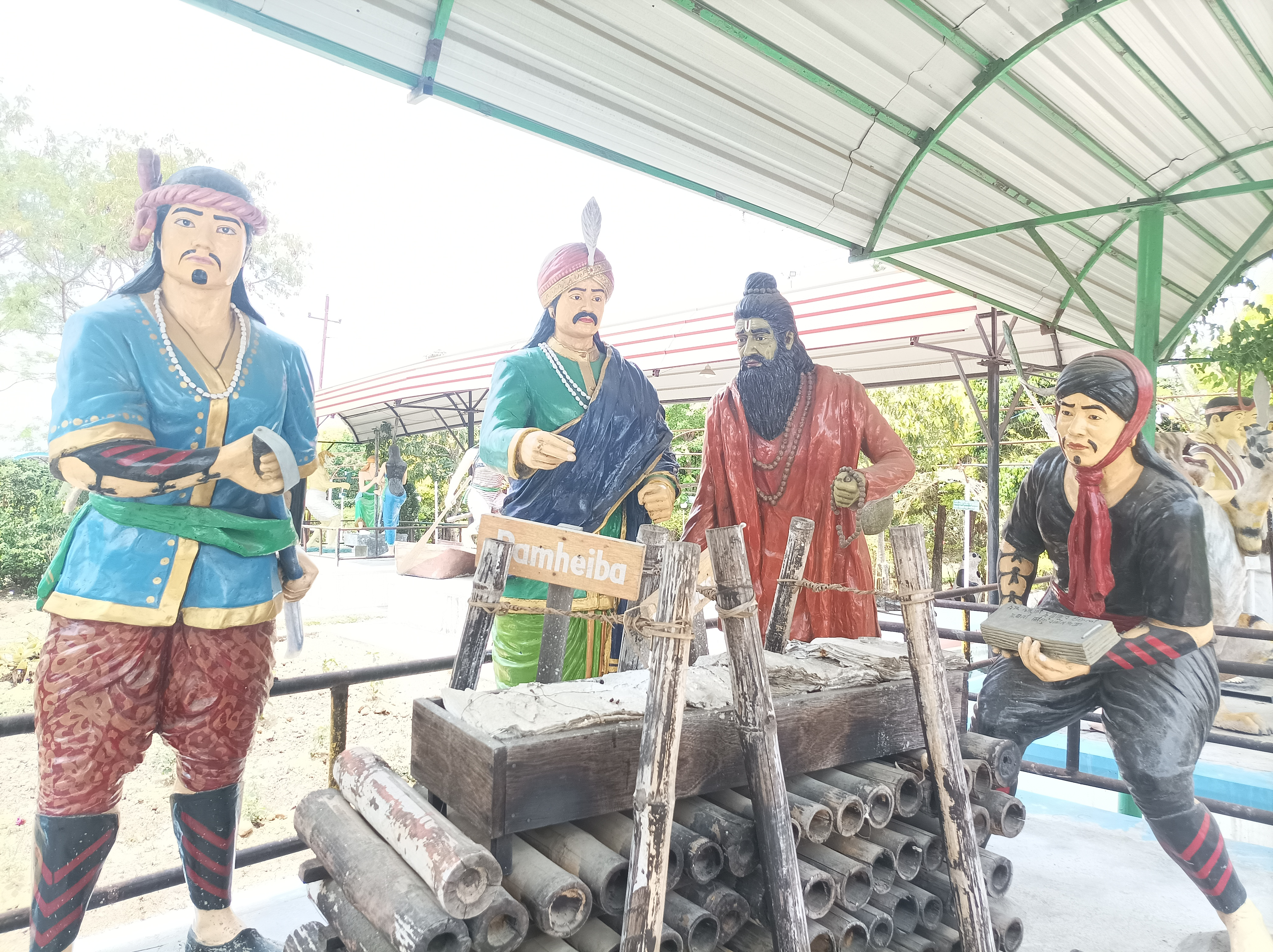
Depiction of the 18th century historic burning of texts written in Meitei script.

Before 1675 CE, the Meitei language experienced no significant influence from any other languages. Beginning in the late 17th century, Hindu influence on Meitei culture increased, and the Meitei language experienced some influences from other languages, on its phonology, morphology (linguistics), syntax and semantics. At the same time, the Hinduised King Pamheiba ordered that the Meitei script be replaced by the Bengali-Assamese script.

In 1725 CE, Pamheiba wrote Parikshit, possibly the first piece of Meitei-language Hindu literature, based on the story of the eponymous king Parikshit of the Mahabharata.

=== Modern Meitei ===
Modern Meitei
- Modern Meithei, Modern Manipuri
- ꯑꯅꯧꯕ ꯃꯅꯤꯄꯨꯔꯤ/অনৌবা মনিপুরী (Anouba Manipuri)
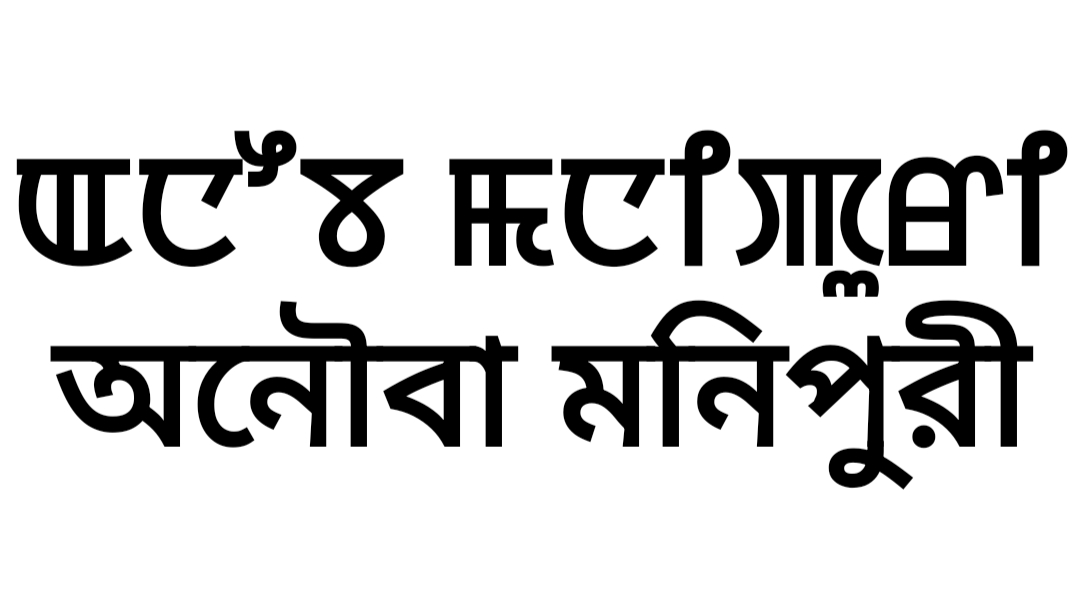
- Meitei Mayek & Bengali script transliterations of "Anouba Manipuri"
- Era: early 19th century till present
- Early forms: Ancient Meitei: Medieval Meitei
- Writing system: Meitei script, Bengali script

Official status
- Official language in: India
- Recognised minority language in: Bangladesh, Myanmar

Language codes
- ISO 639-3: mni

Modern Meitei (also called Modern Manipuri, or Anouba Manipuri, or Modern Meithei) is the modern standardized form of the Meitei language (officially known as "Manipuri"), used primarily in present-day Manipur and among Meitei diaspora communities. It represents the contemporary stage of the language following earlier historical forms of Meitei, with developments in phonology, grammar, vocabulary, and script usage influenced by modernization, education, and media. Modern Meitei is the primary official language of Manipur, and the "associate official" language of Assam, and a scheduled language of the Indian Union, and is used in administration, education, literature, and mass communication.

Modern Meitei has emerged after the old Meithei (Ancient Meitei language) passed through its earlier phases of literary and script usage. In the Tibeto-Burman classification, it is recognized as a distinct linguistic unit. Thus, through its historical development and its tradition of literacy and culture, it has established itself as a significant written language in its own right.

Modern period of the language began in the early nineteenth century after English education had existed among the Manipuri people. However, according to the Indian Institute of Advanced Study, the modern period of the language started from the Anglo-Manipur War of Independence of 1891, even though earlier British connections had started influencing its changes.

In modern grammar of the language, there are free variations of initial "-k" and "-p" with "-g" and "-b" respectively, in some words, when these are started by vowels.

==== Distinction from earlier forms ====
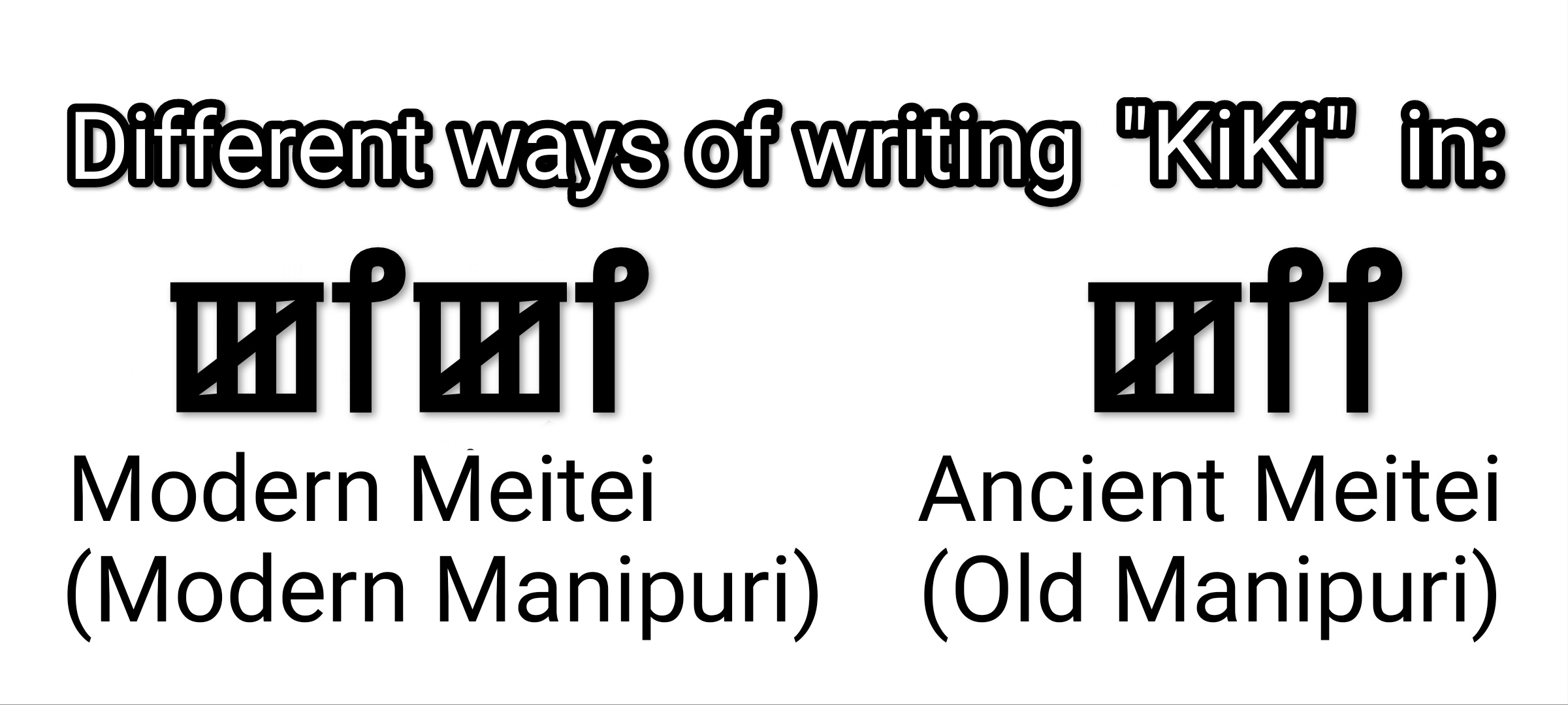

===== Distinction from pre-20th century forms =====
English Gloss	Modern Meithei Word	Word from Pre-20th Century Manuscript	Groups which predominantly used the respective words
axe	iŋjəŋ	haypi	Moiraang
bridge	thoŋ	tiŋpi	Luwaang
cock	yenba	soypay	Khuman
drum	puŋ	khoŋ	Selloi Langmaai
fire	məy	yay	Selloi Langmaai
gold	səna	coynəw	Selloi Langmaai
house	səŋgay	yakon	Khuman
iron	yot	tetnaw	Selloi Langmaai
lake	pat	kon	Khuman
land	kəŋphal	ya	Khuman
land	kəŋphal	koŋ	Moiraang
oar	nəw	tawtek	Khuman
road, path	lambi	muŋpi	Luwaang
to die	sibə	totpə	Selloi Langmaai
umbrella	yempak	waykəw	Luwaang
water	isiŋ	loklaw	Moiraang

===== Distinction from Old/Ancient/Archaic Meitei (historical stages) =====
English	Modern Meithei	Archaic Meithei	Etymological Notes
button	hayru	punuŋ həyru	punuŋ 'shirt'
destination	thuŋphəm	waythuŋ- phəm	way 'whereabout', thun 'reach' phəm 'place'
fishing trap	lu	lolu	lon, 'weave', lu 'trap'
fishing trap	lu	luphui	phui 'bear, give birth'
house	yum	lol yim	yim is presumably the same as yum 'house'
to call	kəwbə	pəw kəwbə	pəw 'news' kəw 'call'
to fear	kibə	soŋ kiba	soŋ 'dense' ki 'fear'
to seat	phəmbə	phəmphəm bə	phəm 'seat' (noun) 'seat'
tusk	səmmu məya	ləŋŋoy moysəyə	ləŋŋoy 'elephant', səmmu 'elephant'.

===== Inscription renderings =====
Languages	Sentences
Section 1
Modern Meitei	Laairemma chingtharaklibabu.
Ancient Meitei	Laailemaa chingthaalaalimaamubhu.
English Literal	Lairemma which was brought down.
Section 2
Modern Meitei	Khaakhaaikhingalbhanaa khangdaduna. thak
Ancient Meitei	Khaakhaaikhingalbhaana khangdaadunaa. thak
English Literal	by Khaakhaaikhingalbha because he was unaware. on
Section 3
Modern Meitei	khukaada kumme. kouthabaga
Ancient Meitei	khudadaa kum. Khouthabhaakaa
English Literal	the seat descended. as it was invoked
Section 4
Modern Meitei	ngaallee. akiba. kaakei.
Ancient Meitei	aangaale. aakiba. kaakei.
English Literal	brightened. by a radiance of light. frightened.
Section 5
Modern Meitei	Laairembina thoujanbiriramme.
Ancient Meitei	Laarembhaanaa thouchaalchaarambhaame.
English Literal	by the goddess graced with kindness.
Section 6
Modern Meitei	Konthoujamga thounaaidaba amurak hannaa Haaorok
Ancient Meitei	Kamthouchaasalkaa thounaadabha amarak ma Haaraak.
English Literal	Konthoujam on the service once more Haaorok
FREE TRANSLATION: The likeness of the goddess, which was brought down by Kaagingamba because he was unaware, descended on the seat. As an invocation to the goddess was performed a bright radiant light frightened the king. Graced by the goddess with kindness, then Konthoujam Haaork once more continued in her service.

==== Vocabulary ====
Modern Manipuri vocabularies contain loanwords from Indo-Aryan languages, especially Sanskrit, Bengali, Hindi and Urdu, transmitted through traders, travellers and pilgrims. Hindi and Urdu loanwords are notably found to contain distinct phonemes.

==== Lexicon ====
- Manipuri to Manipuri and English Dictionary, the first modern Manipuri to Manipuri Dictionary containing about 30,000 words, was authored by Khelachandra.

== Geographical distribution ==
The majority of Meitei speakers, about 1.5 million live in the Indian state of Manupur. Meitei is the official language of the Government of Manipur as well as its lingua franca.

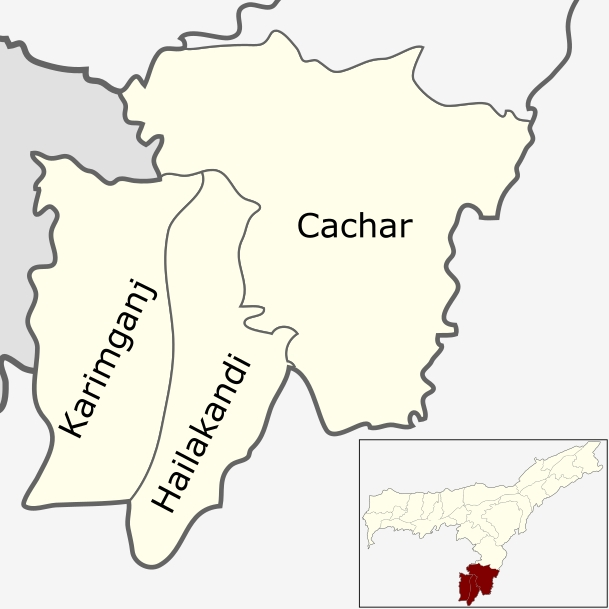
Districts of Barak Valley – Meitei speaking population settlement areas of Assam

There are nearly 170,000 Meitei-speakers in Assam, mainly in the Barak Valley, where it is the third most commonly used language after Bengali and Hindi. Manipuri is also spoken by about 9500 people in Nagaland, in communities such as Dimapur, Kohima, Peren and Phek. Meitei is a second language for various Naga and Kuki-Chin ethnic groups.

Areas with significant numbers of Meitei speakers in Bangladesh

There are around 15,000 Meitei speakers in Bangladesh mainly are in the districts of Sylhet, Moulvibazar, Sunamganj and Habiganj in the Sylhet Division of Bangladesh. In the past, there was a Meitei speaking population in Dhaka, Mymensingh and Comilla also. Manipuri is used as a second language by the Bishnupriya Manipuri people.

Myanmar has a significant Meitei speaking population in the states of Kachin and Shan and the regions of Yangon, Sagaing, and Ayeyarwady, among others.

== Name ==
According to the Ethnologue, the alternative names of Meitei language are Kathe, Kathi, Manipuri, Meetei, Meeteilon, Meiteilon, Meiteiron, Meithe, Meithei, Menipuri, Mitei, Mithe, Ponna.

The name Meitei or its alternate spelling Meithei is preferred by many native speakers of Meitei over Manipuri. The term is derived from the Meitei word for the language Meitheirón (Meithei + -lon 'language', pronounced /mə́i.təi.lón/). Meithei may be a compound from mí 'man' + they 'separate'. This term is used by most Western linguistic scholarship. Meitei scholars use the term Meit(h)ei when writing in English and the term Meitheirón when writing in Meitei. Chelliah (2015: 89) notes that the Meitei spelling has replaced the earlier Meithei spelling.

The language (and people) is also referred to by the loconym Manipuri. The term is derived from the name of the state of Manipur. Manipuri is the official name of the language for the Indian government and is used by government institutions and non-Meitei authors. The term Manipuri is also used to refer to the different languages of Manipur and to the people. Additionally, Manipuri, being a loconym, can refer to anything pertaining to the Manipur state.

Speakers of Meitei language are known as "Kathe" by the Burmese people, "Moglie" or "Mekhlee" by the people of Cachar, Assam (Dimasas and Assamese) and "Cassay" by the Shan people and the other peoples living in the east of the Ningthee River (or Khyendwen River). "Ponna" is the Burmese term used to refer to the Meiteis living inside Burma.

== Dialects ==
The Meitei language exhibits a degree of regional variation; however, in recent years the broadening of communication, as well as intermarriage, has caused the dialectal differences to become relatively insignificant. The only exceptions to this occurrence are the speech differences of the dialects found in Tripura, Bangladesh and Myanmar. The exact number of dialects of Meitei is unknown.

The three main dialects of Meitei are: Meitei proper, Loi and Pangal. Differences between these dialects are primarily characterised by the extensions of new sounds and tonal shifts. Meitei proper is considered to be the standard variety—and is viewed as more dynamic than the other two dialects. The brief table below compares some words in these three dialects:

Standard Meitei	Loi	Pangal	English translation
chaaba	chaapa	chaaba	to eat
kappa	kapma	kappa	to weep
saabiba	saapipa	saabiba	to make
thamba	thampa	thamba	to put
chuppiba	chuppipa	chuppiba	to kiss

Devi (2002) compares the Imphal, Andro, Koutruk, and Kakching dialects of Meitei.

== Status ==
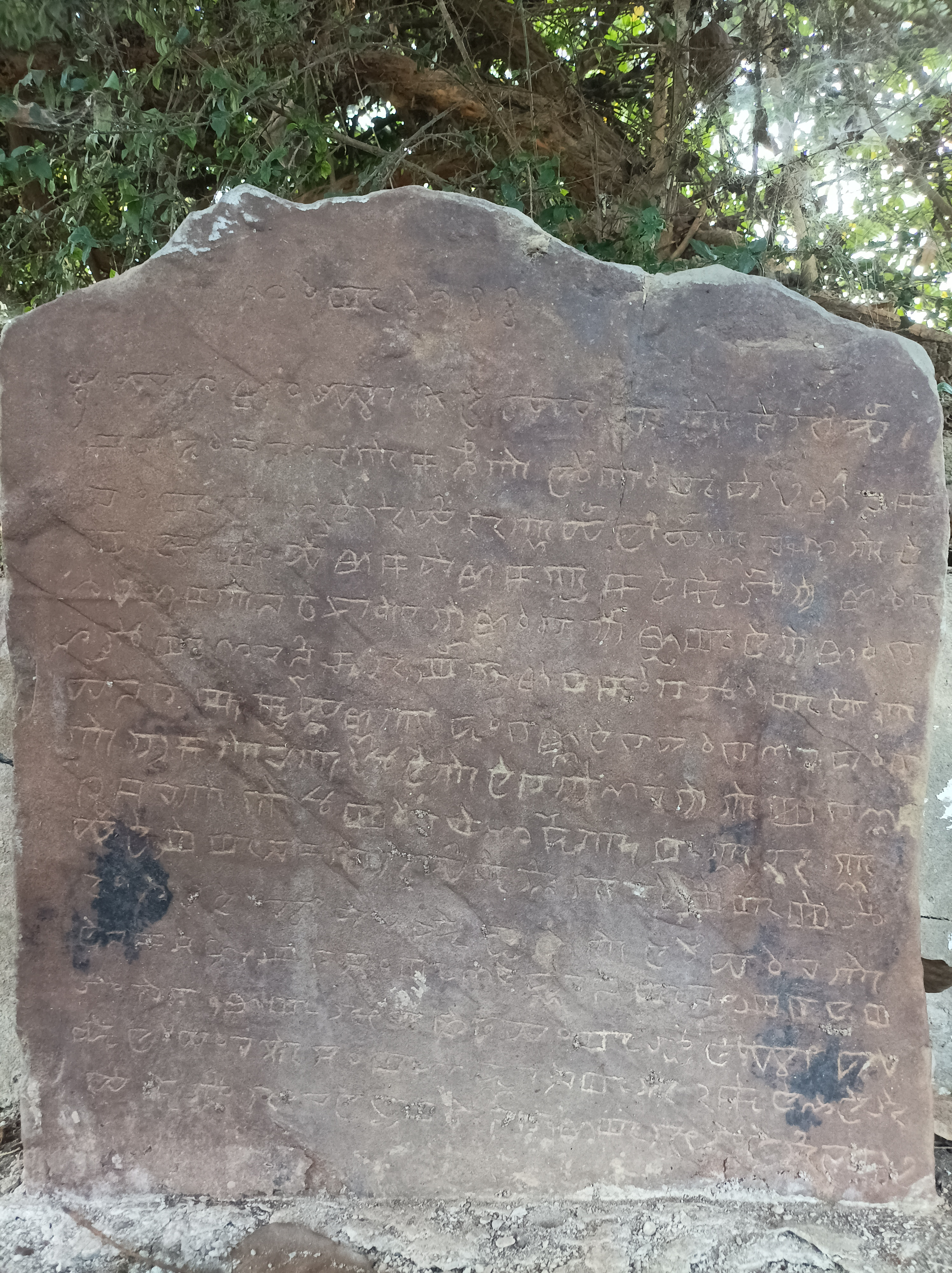
An 1822 CE stone recording a royal decree attributed to King Jai Singh (r. 1759–1762, 1763–1798), erected at Andro, Imphal East, Manipur

Meitei is the sole official language of the Government of Manipur, and has been an official language of India since 1992.

Meitei language was the court language of the historic Manipur Kingdom, and before it merged into the Indian Republic. The Sahitya Akademi, India's National Academy of Letters, recognised Meitei as one of the major advanced Indian literary languages in 1972, long before it became an official language in 1992. In 1950, the Government of India did not include Meitei in its list of 14 official languages. A language movement, spearheaded by organisations including the Manipuri Sahitya Parishad and the All Manipur Students' Union demanded that Meitei be made an official language for more than 40 years, until Meitei was finally added to the Eighth Schedule to the Constitution of India in 1992.

Meitei became an associate official language of Assam in 2024, following several years of effort by the Meitei associate official language movement to protect the identity, history, culture and tradition of Manipuris in Assam.

The Meitei language is one of the 13 official languages of the India used to administer police, armed services, and civil service recruitment exams.

The Press Information Bureau of the Indian Ministry of Information and Broadcasting publishes in 14 languages, including Meitei.

== Education ==
Meitei is a language of instruction in all in the educational institutions in Manipur. It is one of the 40 instructional languages offered by the Central Board of Secondary Education (CBSE), controlled and managed by the Ministry of Education. Meitei is taught as a subject up to the post-graduate level in Indian universities, including Jawaharlal Nehru University, Delhi University, Gauhati University, and the University of North Bengal. Indira Gandhi National Open University teaches Meitei to undergraduates.

=== Assam ===
Meitei language instruction has been offered in the lower primary schools of Assam since 1956. The Board of Secondary Education, Assam offers secondary education in Manipuri. The Assam Higher Secondary Education Council of Assam offers both Meitei-language schooling and instruction in Meitei as a second language.

Since 2020, the Assam Government has made an annual grant of ₹5 lakh (equivalent to ₹6.4 lakh or US$6,900 in 2026) to the Manipuri Sahitya Parishad (Manipuri Language Council). It also invested ₹6 crore (equivalent to ₹7.7 crore or US$820,000 in 2026) in the creation of a corpus for the development of the Meitei language.

The Department of Manipuri of Assam University offers education up to the Ph.D. level in Meitei language.

=== Tripura ===
Since 1998, the Government of Tripura has offered Meitei language as a "first language" subject at primary level in 24 schools throughout the state.

In December 2021, Tripura University proposed to the Indian Ministry of Education and the University Grants Council (UGC), regarding the introduction of diploma courses in Meitei, along with international languages like Japanese, Korean and Nepali.

== Phonology ==
The exact classification of the Meitei language within Sino-Tibetan remains unclear. It has lexical resemblances to Kuki and Tangkhul.

=== Tone ===
The Meitei language is a tonal language. There is a controversy over whether there are two or three tones.

=== Segments ===
Meitei distinguishes the following phonemes:

Consonants

			Labial	Dental/ Alveolar	Palatal	Velar	Glottal
Nasal			m	n		ŋ	
Plosive	voiceless	unaspirated	p	t	tʃ	k	ʔ
Plosive	voiceless	aspirated	pʰ	tʰ		kʰ	
Plosive	voiced	unaspirated	b	d	dʒ	ɡ	
Plosive	voiced	breathy	bʱ	dʱ		ɡʱ	
Fricative				s			h
Tap				ɾ			
Lateral				l			
Approximant			w		j		

Vowels

	Front	Central	Back
High	i		u
Mid	e	ɐ	o
Low		a	

Note: the central vowel /ɐ/ is transcribed as <ə> in recent linguistic work on Meitei. However, phonetically it is never [ə], but more usually [ɐ]. It is assimilated to a following approximant: /ɐw/ = [ow], /ɐj/ = [ej].

=== Phonological processes ===
A velar deletion is noted to occur on the suffix -lək when following a syllable ending with a /k/ phoneme.

Meitei has a dissimilatory process similar to Grassmann's law found in Ancient Greek and Sanskrit, though occurring on the second aspirate. Here, an aspirated consonant is deaspirated if preceded by an aspirated consonant (including /h/, /s/) in the previous syllable. The deaspirated consonants are then voiced between sonorants.

/tʰin-/ + /-kʰət/ → /tʰinɡət/
pierce {} upward {} {pierce upwards}

/səŋ/ + /kʰom/ → /səŋɡom/
cow {} udder {} milk

/hi-/ + /-tʰok/ → /hidok/
trim {} outward {} {trim outwards}

== Writing systems ==
After the introduction of Vaishnavism in the 18th century, Modern Manipuri is mostly written in Bengali script, under the influence of the Bengali Brahmins.

Modern Meithei also uses Meitei Mayek script, also spelled as Meetei Mayek, besides Bengali script.

=== Meitei script ===
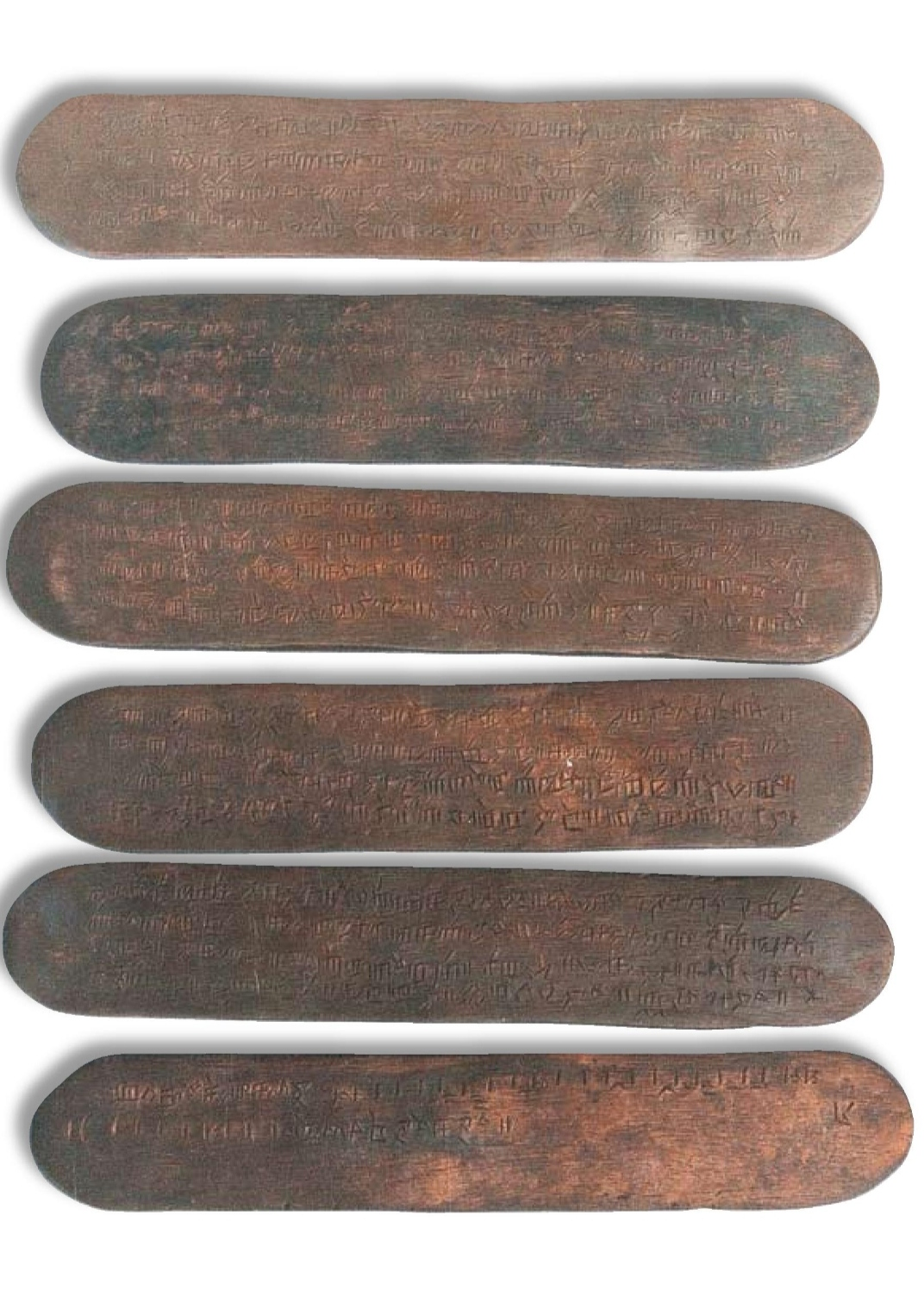
Yumbanlol (Yumpanlol), a group of 6th century Classical Meitei language copper plate inscriptions, written in Meitei script.

The Meitei script (ꯃꯩꯇꯩ ꯃꯌꯦꯛ, Meitei mayek) is one of the official scripts of the Indian Republic. Meitei mayek is also known as Kanglei script (ꯀꯪꯂꯩ ꯃꯌꯦꯛ, kanglei mayek) or kok sam lai script (ꯀꯣꯛ ꯁꯝ ꯂꯥꯏ ꯃꯌꯦꯛ, kok sam lai mayeke), after its first three letters. Its earliest known appearance is on 6th century coins. It was used until the 18th century, when it was replaced by the Bengali script, and then revived in again massively in the 20th. In 2021, the use of Meetei Mayek to write Manipuri was officially adopted by the government of Manipur, alongside Bengali script, with the Bengali script remaining co-official for a period of ten years until 2031.

The Roman alphabet has been used in medium for teaching basic Meitei as a second language teaching by the Board of Secondary Education, Manipur. More recently, the Board has issued a directive that no more Manipuri textbooks using the Latin alphabet be published. Meitei language editions of the Bible in Roman script are very commonly used by the Christians in Manipur.

The Naoriya Phulo script is a constructed script, invented by Laininghan Naoriya Phulo (1888–1941). It shares many similarities with Devanagari and Bengali script. It was championed by Apokpa Marup, but was never widely adopted.

== Grammar ==
Sentences in the Meitei language use the subject–object–verb word order (SOV). For example, in the sentence Ei chak chai (ꯑꯩ ꯆꯥꯛ ꯆꯥꯢ), which translates to I eat rice, the gloss is "ei" (I), "chak" (rice), "chai" (eat).

=== Nouns ===
Nouns and pronouns are marked for number in Meitei. The plural is indicated by the suffixes -khoi (for personal pronouns and human proper nouns) and -sing (for all other nouns). Verbs associated with the pluralised nouns are unaffected. Examples are demonstrated below:

Noun (Meitei)	Noun (English)	Example (Meitei)	Example (English)
angaang	baby	angaang kappi	Baby cries.
angaangsing	babies	angaangsing kappi	Babies cry.

When adjectives are used to be more clear, Meitei utilises separate words and does not add a suffix to the noun. Examples are show in the chart below:

Adjective (Meitei)	Adjective (English)	Example (Meitei)	Example (English)
ama	one	mi ama laak'i	A person comes.
khara	some	mi khara laak'i	Some persons come.
mayaam	many	mi mayaam laak'i	Many persons come.

=== Compound verbs ===
Compound verbs are created by combining root verbs each ending with aspect markers. While the variety of suffixes is high, all compound verbs utilise one of two:

Suffix	English translation
-thok	out/ come out
-ning	To wish/ want/ desire

Aspect markers appear as suffixes that clarify verb tense and appear at the end of the compound verb. Overall, the formula to construct a compound verb becomes [root verb] + [suffix] + [aspect marker]:

Language	Root verb	Suffix	Aspect marker	Combined form
Meitei	tum	-thok	-le	tumthokle
English	sleep	out/ come out	perfect aspect	has started sleeping
Meitei	tum	-ning	-le	tumningle
English	sleep	want	perfect aspect	has felt sleepy

Compound verbs can also be formed utilising both compound suffixes as well, allowing utterances such as pithokningle meaning "want to give out".

== Number words ==
Numeral	Word	Etymology	Meitei Script
1	a-ma ~ a-maa	1	ꯑꯃꯥ
2	a-ni	Proto-Tibeto-Burman *ni	ꯑꯅꯤ
3	a-húm	PTB *sum	ꯑꯍꯨꯝ
4	ma-ri	PTB *li	ꯃꯔꯤ
5	ma-ngaa	PTB *ŋa	ꯃꯉꯥ
6	ta-ruk	PTB *luk	ꯇꯔꯨꯛ
7	ta-ret	PTB *let	ꯇꯔꯦꯠ
8	ni-paan	2-less	ꯅꯤꯄꯥꯟ
9	maa-pan	1-less	ꯃꯥꯄꯟ
10	ta-raa	10	ꯇꯔꯥ
11	taraa-maa-thoi	ten + 1-more	ꯇꯔꯥꯃꯥꯊꯣꯏ
12	taraa-ni-thoi	ten + 2-more	ꯇꯔꯥꯅꯤꯊꯣꯏ
13	taraa-húm-doi	ten + 3-more	ꯇꯔꯥꯍꯨꯝꯗꯣꯏ
14	taraa-mari	ten +4	ꯇꯔꯥꯃꯔꯤ
15	taraa-mangaa	ten +5	ꯇꯔꯥꯃꯉꯥ
16	taraa-taruk	ten +6	ꯇꯔꯥꯇꯔꯨꯛ
17	taraa-taret	ten +7	ꯇꯔꯥꯇꯔꯦꯠ
18	taraa-nipaan	ten +8	ꯇꯔꯥꯅꯤꯄꯥꯟ
19	taraa-maapan	ten +9	ꯇꯔꯥꯃꯥꯄꯟ
20	kun ~ kul	score	ꯀꯨꯟ ~ ꯀꯨꯜ
30	*kun-taraa > kun-thraa	score ten	ꯀꯨꯟꯊ꯭ꯔꯥ
40	ni-phú	two score	ꯅꯤꯐꯨ
50	yaang-khéi	half hundred	ꯌꯥꯡꯈꯩ
60	hum-phú	three score	ꯍꯨꯝꯐꯨ
70	hum-phú-taraa	three score ten	ꯍꯨꯝꯐꯨꯇꯔꯥ
80	mari-phú	four score	ꯃꯔꯤꯐꯨ
90	mari-phú-taraa	four score ten	ꯃꯔꯤꯐꯨꯇꯔꯥ
100	chaama	one hundred	ꯆꯥꯃ
200	cha-ni	two hundreds	ꯆꯥꯅꯤ
300	cha-hum	three hundreds	ꯆꯥꯍꯨꯝ
400	cha-mri	four hundreds	ꯆꯥꯃ꯭ꯔꯤ
500	cha-mangaa	five hundreds	ꯆꯥꯃꯉꯥ
1,000	lisíng ama	one thousand	ꯂꯤꯁꯤꯡ
10,000	lisīng-taraa	ten thousands	ꯂꯤꯁꯤꯡꯇꯔꯥ
1,00,000	licha	one hundred-thousand	ꯂꯤꯆꯥ
10,00,000	licha-taraa	ten hundred-thousands	ꯂꯤꯆꯥꯇꯔꯥ
1,00,00,000	leepun	one ten-million	ꯂꯤꯄꯨꯟ
10,00,00,000	leepun-taraa	ten ten-millions	ꯂꯤꯄꯨꯟꯇꯔꯥ
1,00,00,00,000	leepot	one billion	ꯂꯤꯄꯣꯠ
10,00,00,00,000	leepot-taraa	ten billions	ꯂꯤꯄꯣꯠꯇꯔꯥ
1,00,00,00,00,000	leekei	one hundred-billion	ꯂꯤꯀꯩ
10,00,00,00,00,000	leekei-taraa	ten hundred-billions	ꯂꯤꯀꯩꯇꯔꯥ
1,00,00,00,00,00,000	pu-ama	one ten-trillion	ꯄꯨ ꯑꯃꯥ

== Literature ==
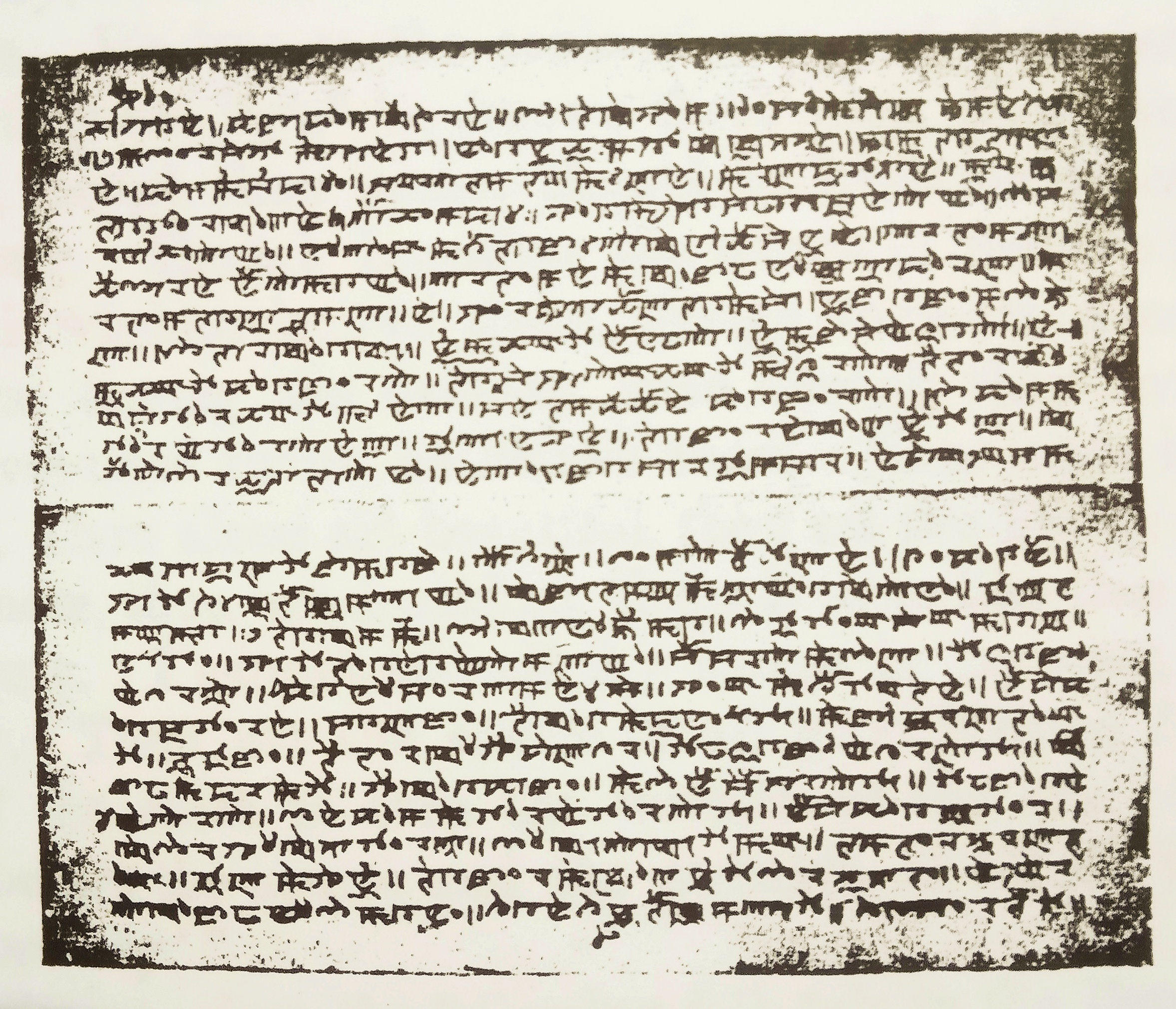
The Numit Kappa, a Classical Meitei 1st century epic based on Meitei mythology and religion.

The Khamba Thoibi Sheireng, a poem of 39,000 verses composed by Hijam Anganghal Singh and first published in 1940 (Meitei: ꯈꯝꯕ ꯊꯣꯏꯕꯤ ꯁꯩꯔꯦꯡ, romanized: Poem on Khamba Thoibi) is regarded as the national epic of the Manipuris. It is a classical Meitei language epic poem based on the ancient romantic adventure tale of Khamba and Thoibi of Moirang. It is regarded as the greatest of all Meitei epic poems.

The Meitei classical language movement seeks to gain recognition for Meitei as one of the Classical Languages of India.

== Annual events ==
Various annual events are organised to promote, protect and develop Meitei language, in the sovereign states of India and Bangladesh in particular as well as in other parts of the world in general.

- Manipuri language day (Meitei: ꯂꯣꯟꯒꯤ ꯅꯨꯃꯤꯠ, romanized: Manipuri Lon-gi Numit) is observed annually on 20 August, commemorating the day in 1992 when Manipuri was made one of the official languages of India.
- Manipuri poetry day (Meitei: ꯃꯅꯤꯄꯨꯔꯤ ꯁꯩꯔꯦꯡꯒꯤ ꯅꯨꯃꯤꯠ, romanized: Manipuri Sheirenggi Numit), is an annual literary event that promotes Meitei language poetry and the traditions of Meitei literature. Events are held in Manipur and in and by Meitei-speakers in Northeast India and West Bengal.
- The Manipuri Language Festival (Meitei: ꯃꯅꯤꯄꯨꯔꯤ ꯂꯣꯟꯒꯤ ꯀꯨꯝꯃꯩ, romanized: Manipuri Lon-gi Kummei) is an annual cultural event that aims to protect and develop of the Meitei language, script and culture in Bangladesh.

=== Literary awards ===
- Manipur State Literature Awards
- Meitei language day awards
- Sahitya Akademi Award for Meitei
- Sahitya Akademi Translation Prize for Meitei
- Yuva Puraskar for Meitei
- Bal Sahitya Puraskar for Meitei
- Manipur State Kala Akademi Awards
- Manipuri Sahitya Parishad Awards

== Software ==
In 2021, Rudali Huidrom, a Manipuri researcher of the EBMT/NLP laboratory, Waseda University, Japan, created a text corpus named "EM Corpus" (shortened form of "Emalon Manipuri Corpus"). It is the first comparable text to text corpus built for Meitei language (mni) and English language (eng) pair from sentences. The writing system used for Meitei language in this corpus is Bengali script. It was crawled and collected from thesangaiexpress.com – the news website of "The Sangai Express", a daily newspaper of Manipur from August 2020 to 2021. In version 1, she created the monolingual data, having 1,034,715 Meitei language sentences and 846,796 English language sentences. In version 2, she created the monolingual data, having 1,880,035 Meitei language sentences and 1,450,053 English language sentences.

EM-ALBERT is the first ALBERT model available for Meitei language. EM-FT is also FastText word embedding available for Meitei language. These resources were created by Rudali Huidrom and are now available at free of cost at the European Language Resources Association catalogue (ELRA catalogue) under CC-BY-NC-4.0 licence.

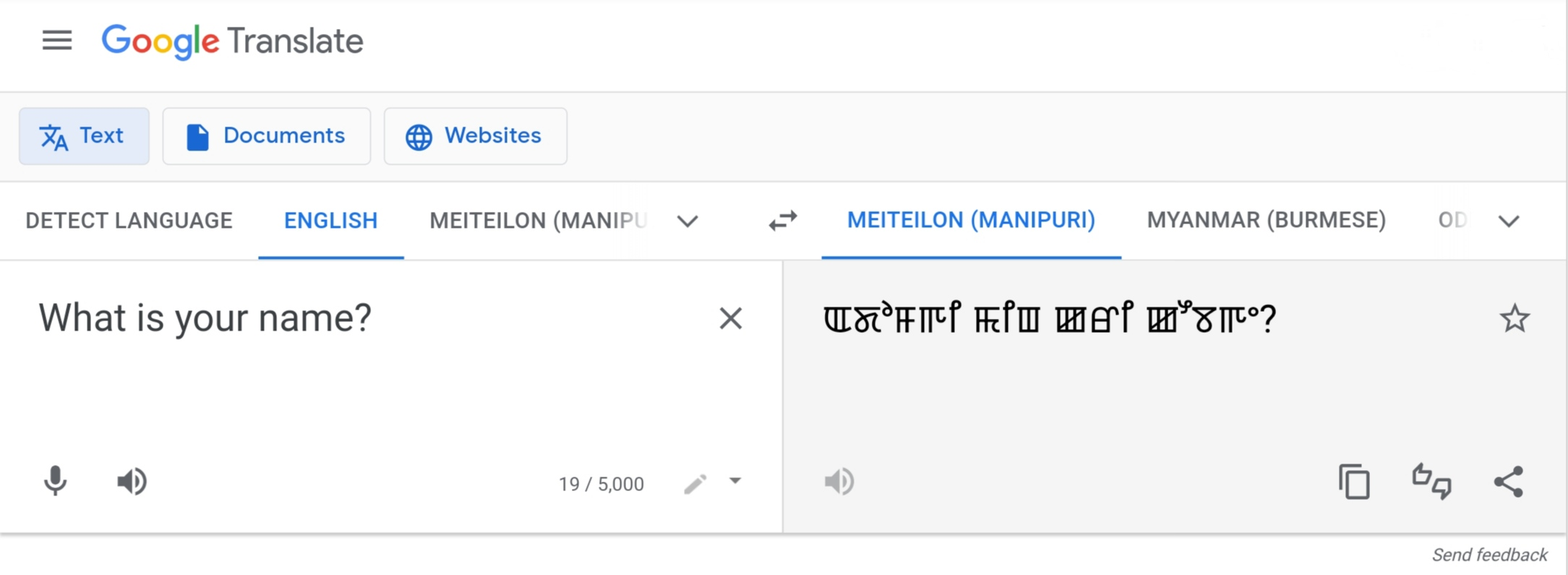
A screen shot of Google Translate translating a sentence from English language into Meitei language

On 11 May 2022, Google Translate added Meitei-language (under the name "Meiteilon (Manipuri)") during its addition of 24 new languages to the translation tool. The writing system used for Meitei language in this tool is Meitei script.

=== MT, NMT & LLM ===
System / Platform	Category	Script Support	Access Platforms	Core Features / Notes	Ref.
Google Translate	Global commercial	Meitei Mayek	Web browser, Android/iOS Apps, Cloud Translation API	for general consumer use.	
Microsoft Translator	Global commercial	Meitei Mayek & Romanised	Bing Translator, MS Office Integration, Azure Cognitive API	translates documents directly within Word, Excel, and Outlook workflows.	
Bhashini (Anuvadak)	Indian national initiative	Meitei Mayek	Web portal, Bhashini Mobile App, Government Open APIs	built by the Government of India; features high-quality voice-to-voice translation with male/female speech engines.	
Sarvam AI	Indian enterprise AI	Meitei Mayek & Romanised	Unified Indic Language Developer API	low-latency neural translation pipeline designed for developers building Indian-context LLM applications.	
ModernMT	Enterprise localisation	Meitei script	Paid Enterprise Web Portal, Developer API	uses adaptive neural networks that dynamically learn from user corrections; features automatic translation quality estimation.	
Meitei Mayek Platform (MeiteiMayek.com)	Specialised / Cultural	Meitei Mayek	Web tools, offline-first developer utilities	dedicated platform for script preservation, cultural translation, and native script conversion tools.	
NITS-CNLP Systems (NIT Silchar)	Academic research	Primarily Meitei Mayek script (English pairs)	Academic open-source repositories (WMT benchmarks)	high-performing research-grade models optimised for benchmarking English-to-Manipuri translation pairs.	
NiuTrans & TexTra	Open-Source Framework	Machine-readable Meitei text	Self-hosted server architectures, custom API pipelines	for developer teams needing to deploy, train, and host their own private translation servers.	

== Sample text ==
The following is a sample text in Modern Meitei of the Article 1 of the Universal Declaration of Human Rights (by the United Nations): (Note: The Meitei-language translation of the passage of the Article 1 has two foreign words present, "ꯏꯖꯖꯠ" ("iːdʒət") and "ꯍꯛ" ("hə́k"), meaning "dignity" and "rights" respectively, as given in the source website. The original Meitei-language terms for "dignity" and "rights" are "ꯏꯀꯥꯏ ꯈꯨꯝꯅꯕ" ("í.kai kʰum.nə.bə") and "ꯐꯪꯐꯝ ꯊꯣꯛꯄ" ("pʰəŋ.pʰəm tʰok.pə") respectively.)

ꯃꯤꯑꯣꯏꯕ ꯈꯨꯗꯤꯡꯃꯛ ꯄꯣꯛꯄ ꯃꯇꯝꯗ ꯅꯤꯡꯇꯝꯃꯤ, ꯑꯃꯗꯤ ꯏꯖꯖꯠ ꯑꯃꯁꯨꯡ ꯍꯛ ꯃꯥꯟꯅꯅ ꯂꯧꯖꯩ ꯫ ꯃꯈꯣꯏ ꯄꯨꯝꯅꯃꯛ ꯋꯥꯈꯜ ꯂꯧꯁꯤꯡ ꯁꯦꯡꯏ, ꯑꯐ ꯐꯠꯇ ꯈꯪꯏ, ꯑꯗꯨꯅ ꯑꯃꯅ ꯑꯃꯒ ꯂꯣꯏꯅꯕ ꯃꯇꯝꯗ ꯃꯆꯤꯟ ꯃꯅꯥꯎꯒꯨꯝꯅ ꯂꯣꯏꯅꯒꯗꯕꯅꯤ ꯫ (in Meitei script)

মিওইবা খুদিংমক পোকপা মতমদা নিংতম্মী, অমদি ইজ্জৎ অমসুং হক মান্ননা লৌজৈ । মখোই পুম্নমক ৱাখল লৌশিং শেঙই, অফ ফত্তা খঙই, অদুনা অমনা অমগা লোইনবদা মচীন মনাওগুম্না লোইনগদবনি । (in Bengali script)

Mioiba khudingmak pokpa matamda ningtammi amadi ijjat amasung hak mānnana leijei, makhoi pumnamak wākhal loushing shengi, apha phatta khangi, aduna amana amaga loinabada machin manāogumna loinagadabani. (Roman transliteration)

míːójbə kʰud̯íŋmək pókpə mət̯ə̀md̯ə níːŋt̯ə̀mmi, əməd̯i iːdʒət əməʃùng hə́k màːnənə lɐ̀jdʒɐ̀j. məkʰój púmnəmək wakʰə̀l lə̀wʃiŋ ʃèŋi, əpʱə̀ pʱə́ːt̯ə kʰə́ŋi, əd̯unə əmənə əməgə lòjnəbəd̯ə mət͡ʃìn mənáwgùmnə lójnəgəd̯əbəni' (IPA transliteration).

English: All human beings are born free and equal in dignity and rights. They are endowed with reason and conscience and should act towards one another in a spirit of brotherhood.

== See also ==
- Meitei language in India
  - Meitei language in Assam
  - Meitei language in Tripura
- Meitei language in Bangladesh
- Meitei language in Myanmar
- Languages of India
- List of languages by number of native speakers in India
- List of Meitei poets
- Meitei inscriptions
- Meitei literature
- Meitei Language Day
- List of epics in Meitei language
- Vikaspedia
- State Level Committee for declaration of Manipuri Language as Classical Language of India
