= Manipuri Language Festival =

Annual literary festival in Bangladesh

Meitei language festival
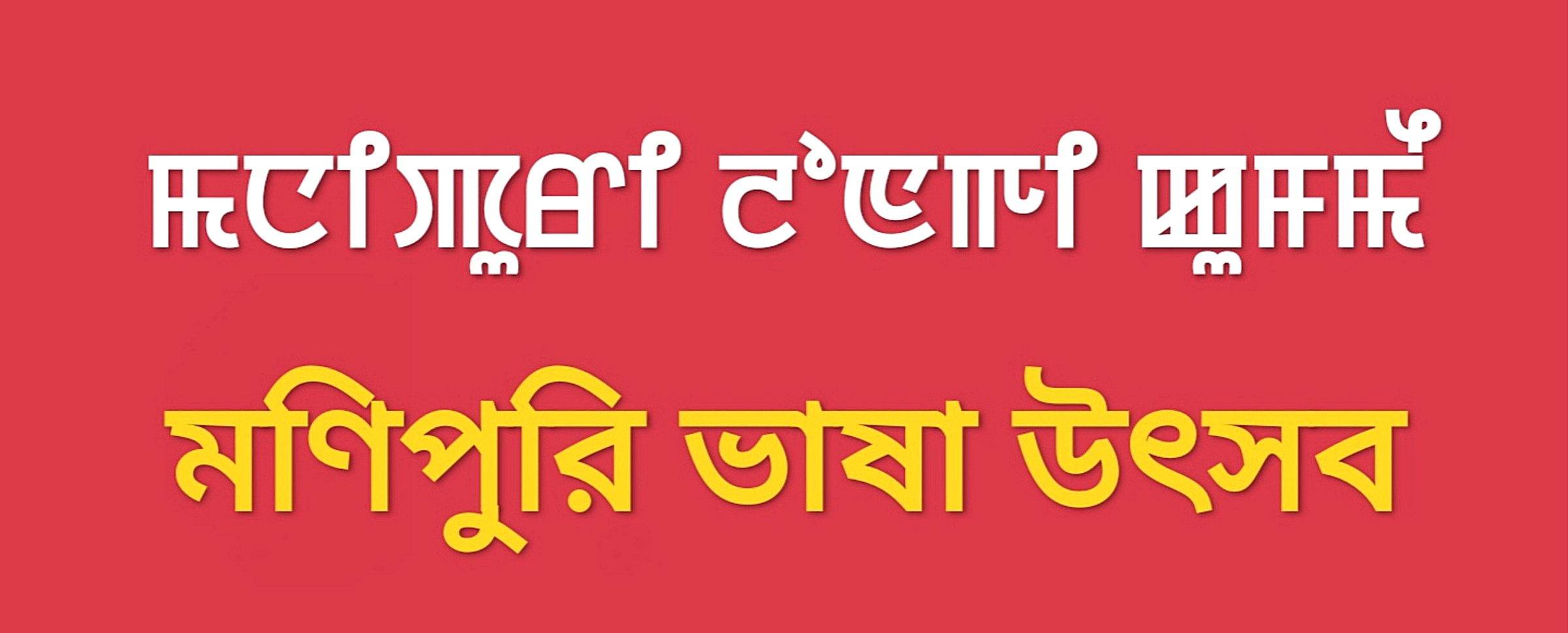
- Meitei language festival
- Native name: Manipuri Lon-gi Kummei; Manipuri Bhasha Utsav
- English name: Manipuri language festival
- Date: 2008; 18 years ago
- Venue: Kamalganj, Moulvibazar; Bishganj; Bhanuganj; Jhotamaiz
- Location: Bangladesh
- Also known as: Manipuri Language and Culture Festival (Bengali: Manipuri Bhasha o Sanskriti Utsav)
- Type: annual event
- Theme: Meitei language (officially called Manipuri language)
- Target: preservation and development of Meitei language, indigenous Meitei script (Note: The event promotes the indigenous Meitei writing system to be used for the Meitei language, other than the already predominantly used Bengali script.) and Meitei culture (Note: The event also focuses on the cultural programs, besides the mother tongue, the Meitei language.) in Bangladesh
- Patron: Bangladesh Manipuri Sahitya Sangsad
- Organised by: Bangladesh Manipuri Sahitya Sangsad
- Participants: Meitei people (AKA Manipuri people)

The Manipuri Language Festival (Meitei: Manipuri Lon-gi Kummei), also known as the Meitei Language Festival or the Manipuri Bhasha Utsav, is an annual language festival dedicated to the promotion and the development of the Manipuri Meitei language, Meitei script, and Meitei culture in Bangladesh. The event is organised by the Bangladesh Manipuri Literary Society (Bengali: বাংলাদেশ মণিপুরি সাহিত্য সংসদের, romanized: Bangladesh Manipuri Sahitya Sangsad).

== Festival activities ==
The festival is held at Adampur Tetaigaon Rashid Uddin High School premises in Kamalganj, Moulvibazar. It includes an opening address and colourful procession and rally of Meitei students and guests, a payment of tribute at the local Martyrs' Monument to those protestors who died during the Bengali language movement of 1952, and meetings, including cultural programs and prize-giving.

Students in the 1st-8th grade (A branch) and 9th-10th grade (B branch) in the festival, had the opportunity to take a written test in their mother tongue.

== 2022 ==
In 2022, AK Sheram, the president of the Bangladesh Manipuri Sahitya Sangsad, and Shahena Begum, the then-acting principal of Teteigaon Ramid Uddin High School, opened the Manipuri Language Festival. Later, a meeting attended by Saurabh Sikdar of the Linguistics Department of Dhaka University and Mathura Vikas Tripura, executive director of the Jabarang Welfare Organisation and member of the International Indigenous Languages Decade National Committee, was held to discuss the practice and promotion of the Meitei language and culture in the school.

== 2023 event ==
The main meeting was chaired by poet and essayist AK Sheram and the organization's general secretary, Nambram Shankar. Special guests included Parimal Singh, the secretary of the National Sports Council of Bangladesh, and N. Ratan Meitei.

== Publications ==
"Meira" (Meitei: ꯃꯩꯔꯥ; মৈরা, romanized: /mə́i.ra/, lit. 'Torch'), the cover of commemorative collection of the festival was released at the 2023 Meitei Language Festival.

== See also ==
- Meitei language movements
  - Meitei classical language movement
  - Meitei associate official language movement
  - Meitei linguistic purism movement
- Directorate of Language Planning and Implementation
- Sahitya Akademi
  - List of Sahitya Akademi Award winners for Meitei
  - List of Sahitya Akademi Translation Prize winners for Meitei
  - List of Yuva Puraskar winners for Meitei
- Manipuri Sahitya Parishad
- Manipur University
- Manipur University of Culture
