= Meitei script =

Writing system used to write Meitei language

Meitei script (Meitei: ꯃꯩꯇꯩ ꯃꯌꯦꯛ, romanized: Meitei Mayek)
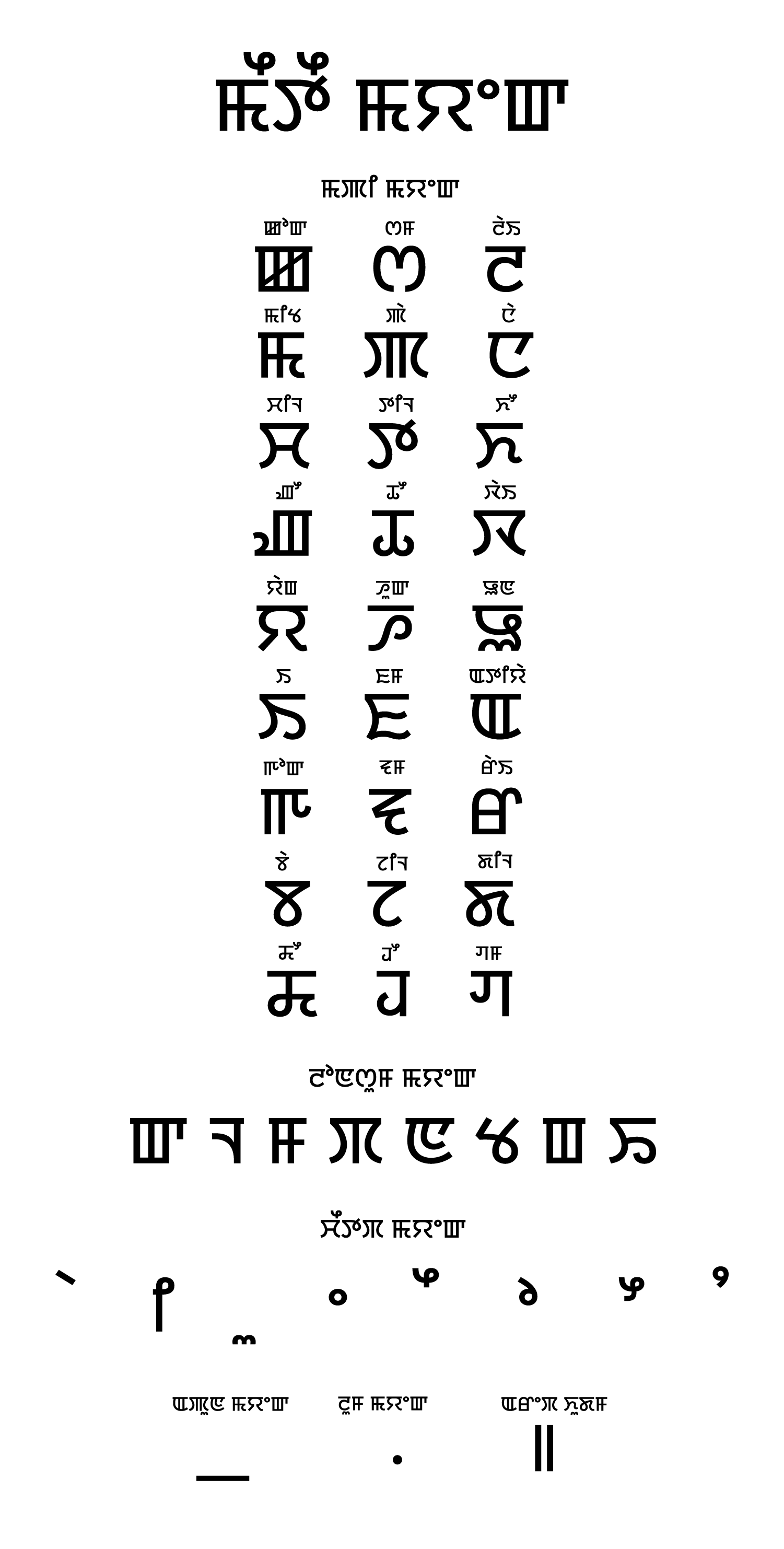
- The Modern Meitei Alphabet chart divided into 27 Main letters, 8 lonsum letters, 8 vowel diacritics & 3 special marks
- Script type: Abugida
- Period: late 6th to early 7th century - 18th century AD, revived 1930 – present
- Direction: Left-to-right
- Official script: for Meitei language in India
- Region: India: Manipur
- Languages: Meitei (Manipuri) language

Related scripts
- Parent systems: Egyptian hieroglyphs: Proto-Sinaitic script; Phoenician alphabet; Aramaic alphabet; Brahmi script; Gupta script (Note: Or the Tibetan group of scripts. See #Origin); Meitei script
- Sister systems: Lepcha, Khema, ʼPhags-pa, Marchen

ISO 15924
- ISO 15924: Mtei (337), Meitei Mayek (Meithei, Meetei)

Unicode
- Unicode alias: Meetei Mayek
- Unicode range: Meetei Mayek (Unicode block)

The Meitei script (Meitei: ꯃꯩꯇꯩ ꯃꯌꯦꯛ, romanized: Meitei mayek), also known as the Kanglei script (Meitei: ꯀꯪꯂꯩ ꯃꯌꯦꯛ, romanized: Kanglei mayek) or the Kok Sam Lai script (Meitei: ꯀꯣꯛ ꯁꯝ ꯂꯥꯏ ꯃꯌꯦꯛ, romanized: Kok Sam Lai mayek), after its first three letters, is an abugida in the Brahmic family used to write Meitei language, the official language of Manipur, Assam and one of the 22 official languages of India. It is first known from engravings on coins and copper plate inscriptions dated between 568 and 658 C.E, as verified by the various publications of the National Sahitya Akademi. It was used till the 18th century, until it was replaced by the Bengali script. In the 21st century, it was revived and reused. Beginning in 2021, the Government of Manipur began to officially use it, alongside the Bengali script, per the Manipur Official Language (Amendment) Act, 2021.

Since Meitei language does not have voiced consonants, there are only fifteen consonant letters used for native words, plus three letters for pure vowels. Nine additional consonants letters are available for writing loan words. There are seven vowel diacritics and a final consonant (/ŋ/) diacritic. The names of the twenty-seven letters are based on parts of the human body.

== Origin ==
The origin of the Meitei script remains undetermined. One theory considers it a variety or direct development of the Gupta Brahmi script, while another places it within the Tibetan group of scripts, which ultimately developed from the Gupta Brahmi as well.

Singh in People of India (1992) describes Meitei-Mayak as a variety of Gupta Brahmi. Similarly in Languages and Scripts (1993), Singh and Manoharan state that the old Manipuri script developed from Gupta Brahmi. This view is also found in other linguistic and historical works, which characterize Meitei Mayek as deriving directly from Gupta Brahmi.

Another view places Meitei Mayek within the "Tibetan group of scripts". Singh and Manoharan (1993) classify Meitei Mayek alongside Tibetan, Balti, Hingna, U-Chhen, and U-Med in a Tibetan group based on the Gupta Brahmi-derived Kutilya tradition. They also note that Meitei Mayek underwent modifications to represent the sounds of the Meitei language. This classification is echoed by "Facts about the World's Languages", which includes Meithei Mayek among the Tibetan group of Gupta Brahmi scripts. Other sources are more clear in deriving the Meitei script from the Tibetan group of scripts, rather than just categorizing it as part of this grouping. The "Word: Journal of the Linguistic Circle of New York" (2001) states that Meitei script developed "on the basis of the Tibetan scripts", that themselves originated from Gupta Brahmi. The Encyclopedia of India also names the Limbu, Lepcha, and Meitei scripts as scripts that are based on a version of the Tibetan script. Unicode explicitly states that that Meitei Mayek derived from the Tibetan group of scripts.

== History ==
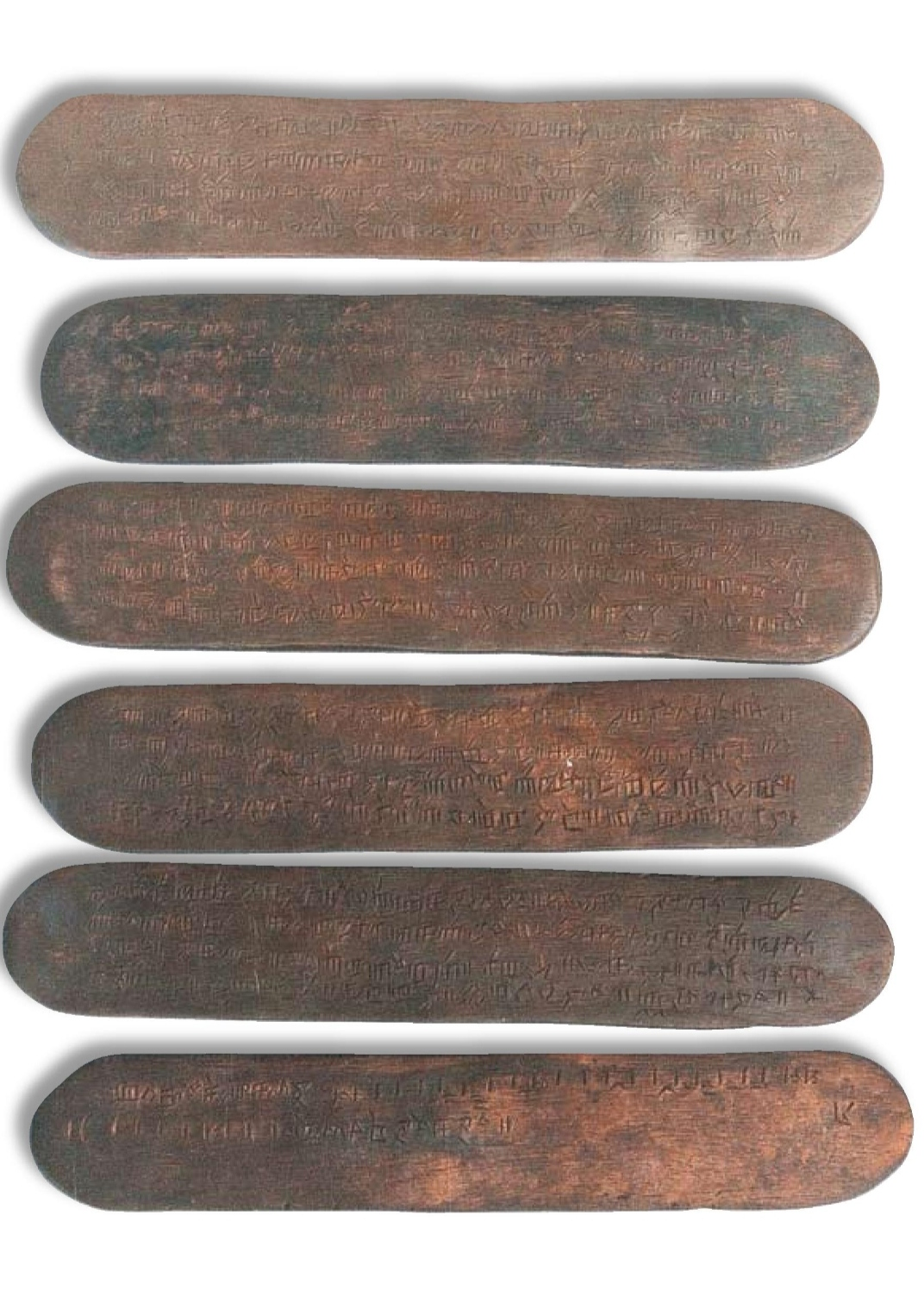
Yumbanlol (Yumpanlol), a group of 6th century ancient Meitei language copper plate inscriptions, written in Meetei script.

Regarding epigraphic records, Meitei script appears in the Yumbanlol (Yumpanlol), composed somewhere between 568 and 658 C.E. It was a group of copper plate inscriptions about an ancient Meitei language literary work.

The Old Manipuri script also appears on coins issued during the reigns of Meitei Kings, Ura Konthouba (c. 568-653 CE) and Ayangba (c. 821-910 CE). These coins are presently preserved in the Mutua Museum in Imphal.

The earliest stone inscription, found in the village of Khoibu, Manipur, is also believed to date to time of Ura Konthouba. This inscription is presently kept in the Manipur State Museum, Imphal.

Another early copper plate Meitei inscription dates to the 8th century CE, inscribed during the reign of King Khongtekcha (c. 721 AD). It was discovered by scholar Yumjao from Phayeng in 1935. It is one of the earliest known examples of Meitei literature.

A stone inscription found at Khoibu in Tengnoupal district, of current Manipur state, contains royal edicts of king Senbi Kiyamba (d. 1508), representing one of the earliest portion of the Chietharol Kumbaba or Royal Chronicle of Manipur. It is one of the primary texts in the Meitei script.

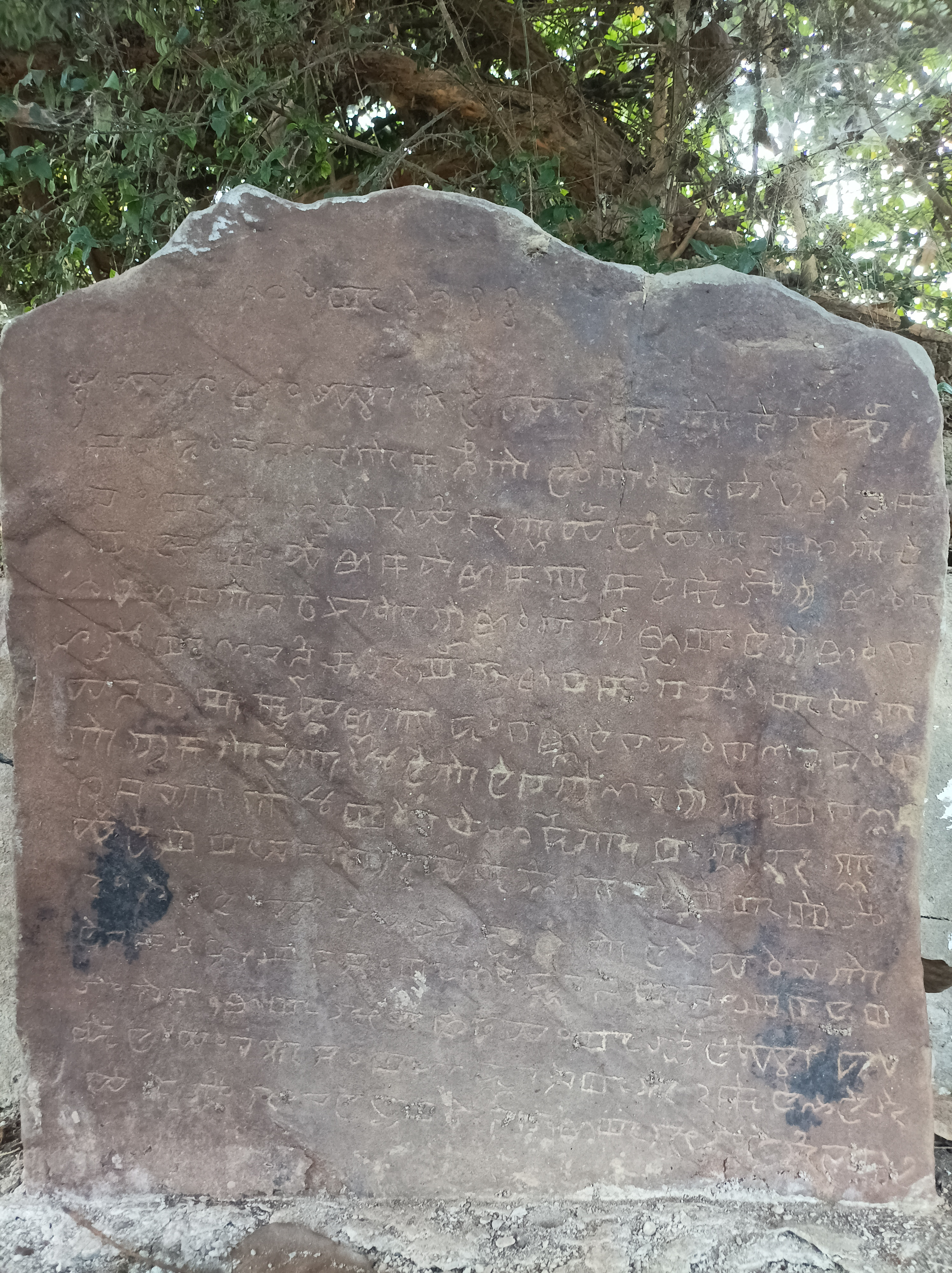
A Meitei language stone inscription in Meitei script about a royal decree of a Meitei king found in the sacred site of God Panam Ningthou in Andro, Imphal East, Manipur.

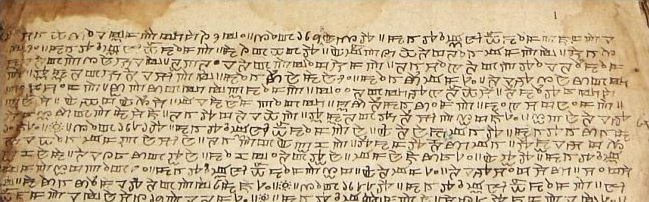
Meitei manuscript

== Recent developments ==
In 1980, a modernized version of the writing system was approved by Manipuri law for use in educational institutions. The modernised version of the Meitei script was encoded in Unicode in 2009.

in 2022, a joint meeting consensus of the Meetei Erol Eyek Loinasillol Apunba Lup, the All Manipur Working Journalists' Union and the Editors' Guild, Manipur agreed that Meitei language newspapers would switch from the Bengali script to the Meitei script from 15 January 2023.

== Letters ==
One of the unique features of this script is the use of body parts in naming the letters. Every letter is named after a human body part in the Meitei language. For example, the first letter "kok" means "head"; the second letter "sam" means "hair"; the third letter "lai" means "forehead", and so on. This association appears in the book Wakoklon Heelel Thilel Salai Amailon Pukok Puya, which details how each script originated received its nomenclature and which is widely considered to be the source of the Meitei script. Some letters have a second form (lonsom) that is used at the end of a word and are used to indicate stop consonants.

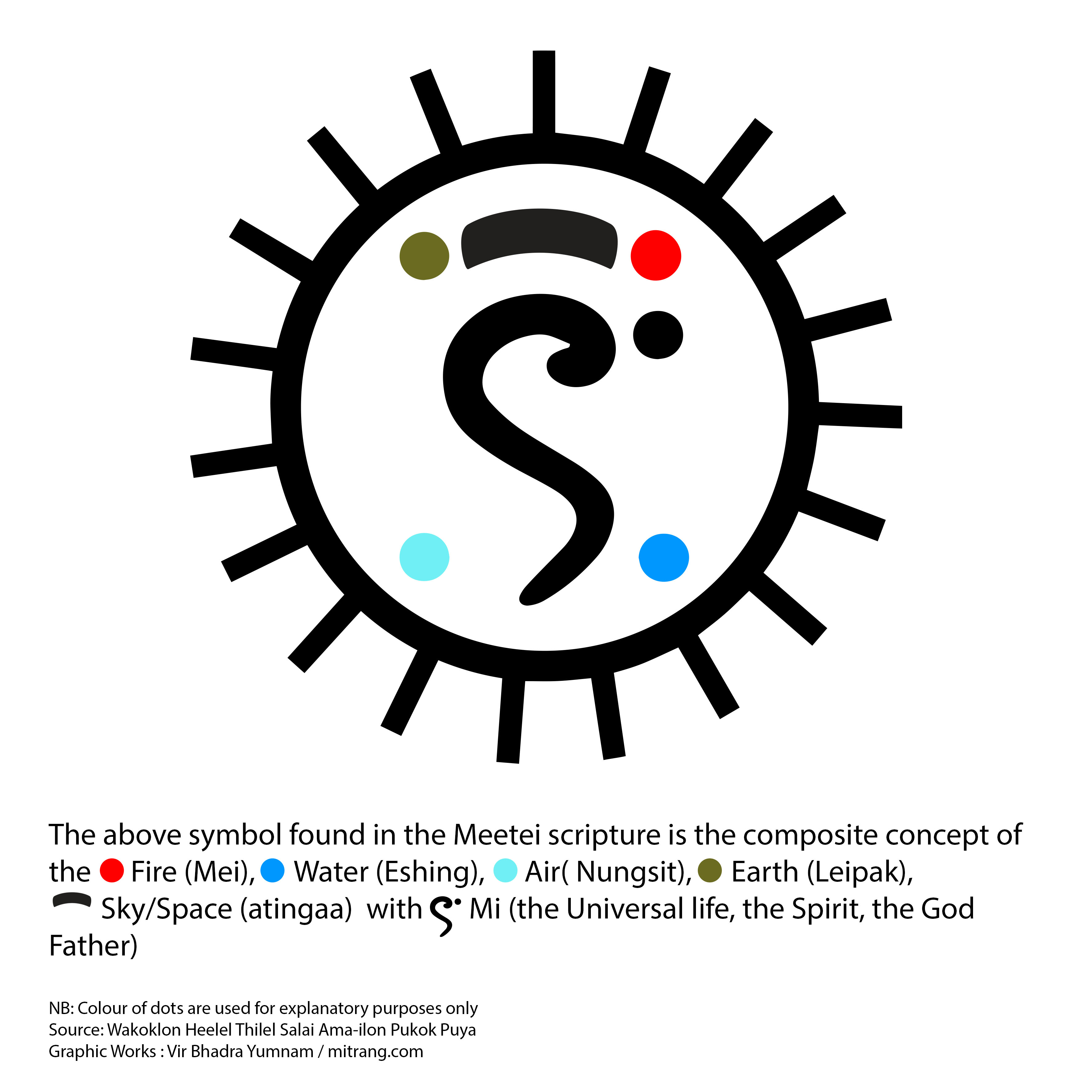
Meitei letter "Ama" (lit. One) in the symbol of Sanamahism (traditional Meitei religion)

In the traditional Meitei religion of Sanamahism Meitei letters and numerals are believed to be the creations of the supreme God.

=== Primary letters ===
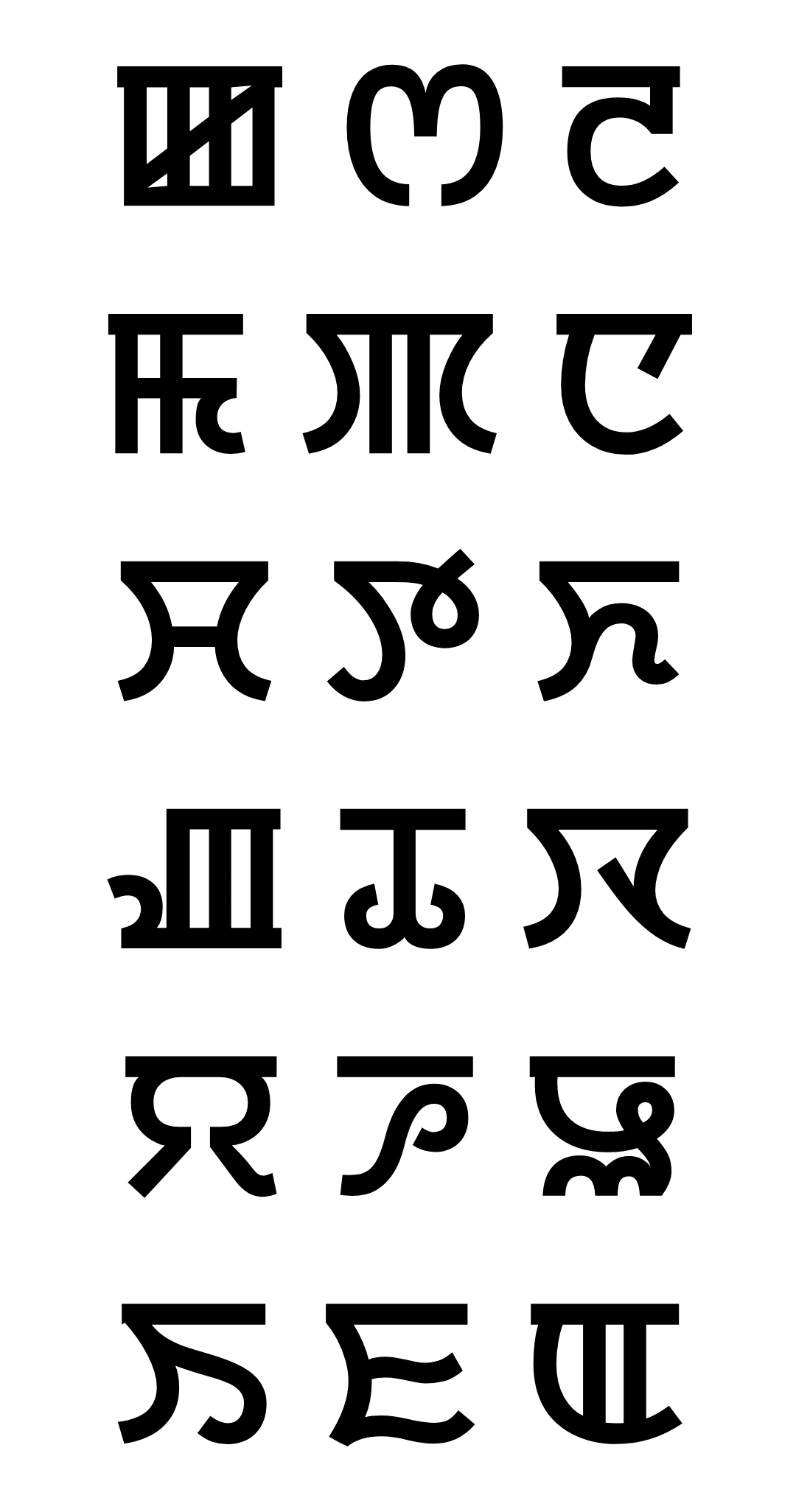
The original 18 letters used in the Meitei Mayek writing system

Letter (inc. IPA)	Name	Meaning(s) (Note: Some of the meanings rendered by some letters (characters) are different according to different sources. So, if found different, they're added together in the same section.)	Lonsum
ꯀ IPA: /k/	ꯀꯣꯛ, kok	head or brain	ꯛ
ꯈ IPA: /kʰ/	ꯈꯧ, khou	throat, palate, neck	
ꯉ IPA: /ŋ/	ꯉꯧ, ngou	pharynx, larynx	ꯡ
ꯆ IPA: /t͡ʃ/	ꯆꯤꯜ, chil	lips	
ꯇ IPA: /t/	ꯇꯤꯜ, til	saliva	ꯠ
ꯊ IPA: /tʰ/	ꯊꯧ, thou	breast, chest, ribs	
ꯅ IPA: /n/	ꯅꯥ, nā	ear	ꯟ
ꯄ IPA: /p/	ꯄꯥ, pā	eyelash	ꯞ
ꯐ IPA: /pʰ/	ꯐꯝ, pham	anus, buttocks, or uterus	
ꯃ IPA: /m/	ꯃꯤꯠ, mit	eye	ꯝ
ꯌ IPA: /j/	ꯌꯥꯡ, yang	spine	
ꯂ IPA: /l/	ꯂꯥꯏ, lai	God	ꯜ
ꯋ IPA: /w/	ꯋꯥꯏ, wai	navel, heart	
ꯁ IPA: /s/	ꯁꯝ, sam	hair	
ꯍ IPA: /h/	ꯍꯨꯛ, huk	joint	
ꯑ IPA: /ɐ/	ꯑꯇꯤꯡꯉꯥ, atinga ꯑꯇꯤꯌꯥ, atiya	immortality, heaven, divinity, birth	
ꯏ IPA: /iː/	ꯏ, e	blood	ꯢ
ꯎ IPA: /u(ː)/	ꯎꯟ, un	skin	

=== Independent vowels ===
In Meitei Mayek, vowels are not listed separately before the consonants, unlike in most Brahmic scripts. Instead, they appear within the main sequence of the script.

Independent vowels are used only when a word starts with a vowel, just like in most Indic scripts. Otherwise, vowels appear as diacritics attached to consonants.

Meitei Mayek has seven independent vowel letters, including ⟨ꯑ⟩, which is used as a default vowel carrier:

ꯑ IPA: /ə/	ꯏ IPA: /i/	ꯎ IPA: /u/	ꯑꯣ IPA: /o/	ꯑꯦ IPA: /e/	ꯑꯧ IPA: /ou/	ꯑꯩ IPA: /ai/

Examples:

- ꯑꯣꯏꯅꯥ (oina) – ‘like ( comparatively ) / left'
- ꯑꯣꯖꯥ (oja) - 'teacher'

Since Meitei Mayek preserves independent vowels, it functions similarly to Brahmic scripts in terms of structure, even though the vowel ordering differs from most Indic alphabets.

=== Vowel diacritics ===
Syllables are written by adding vowel diacritics (cheitap eeyek) to consonants.

Diacritics
diacritic	aa-tap ꯥ IPA: /a/	ee-nap ꯤ IPA: /i/	'uu-nap ꯨ IPA: /u/	yet-nap ꯦ IPA: /e/	ot-nap ꯣ IPA: /o/	chei-nap ꯩ IPA: /ɐj/	sou-nap ꯧ IPA: /ɐw/	nung ꯪ IPA: /əŋ/
ꯀ plus diacritic	ꯀꯥ	ꯀꯤ	ꯀꯨ	ꯀꯦ	ꯀꯣ	ꯀꯩ	ꯀꯧ	ꯀꯪ

=== Numerals ===
Meitei numerals 0–9
0 ꯰ phun	1 ꯱ ama	2 ꯲ ani	3 ꯳ ahum	4 ꯴ mari	5 ꯵ mangā	6 ꯶ taruk	7 ꯷ taret	8 ꯸ nipāl	9 ꯹ mapāl

== Unicode ==
Meetei Mayek (Meitei script) was added to the Unicode Standard in October, 2009 with the release of version 5.2.

The Unicode block for the Meitei script is U+ABC0 – U+ABFF.

Characters for historical orthographies are part of the Meetei Mayek Extensions block at U+AAE0 – U+AAFF.

Meetei Mayek^{[1]}^{[2]} Official Unicode Consortium code chart (PDF)
	0	1	2	3	4	5	6	7	8	9	A	B	C	D	E	F
U+ABCx	ꯀ	ꯁ	ꯂ	ꯃ	ꯄ	ꯅ	ꯆ	ꯇ	ꯈ	ꯉ	ꯊ	ꯋ	ꯌ	ꯍ	ꯎ	ꯏ
U+ABDx	ꯐ	ꯑ	ꯒ	ꯓ	ꯔ	ꯕ	ꯖ	ꯗ	ꯘ	ꯙ	ꯚ	ꯛ	ꯜ	ꯝ	ꯞ	ꯟ
U+ABEx	ꯠ	ꯡ	ꯢ	ꯣ	ꯤ	ꯥ	ꯦ	ꯧ	ꯨ	ꯩ	ꯪ	꯫	꯬	꯭		
U+ABFx	꯰	꯱	꯲	꯳	꯴	꯵	꯶	꯷	꯸	꯹						
Notes 1.As of Unicode version 18.0 2.Grey areas indicate non-assigned code points

Meetei Mayek Extensions^{[1]}^{[2]} Official Unicode Consortium code chart (PDF)
	0	1	2	3	4	5	6	7	8	9	A	B	C	D	E	F
U+AAEx	ꫠ	ꫡ	ꫢ	ꫣ	ꫤ	ꫥ	ꫦ	ꫧ	ꫨ	ꫩ	ꫪ	ꫫ	ꫬ	ꫭ	ꫮ	ꫯ
U+AAFx	꫰	꫱	ꫲ	ꫳ	ꫴ	ꫵ	꫶									
Notes 1.As of Unicode version 18.0 2.Grey areas indicate non-assigned code points

== Software ==
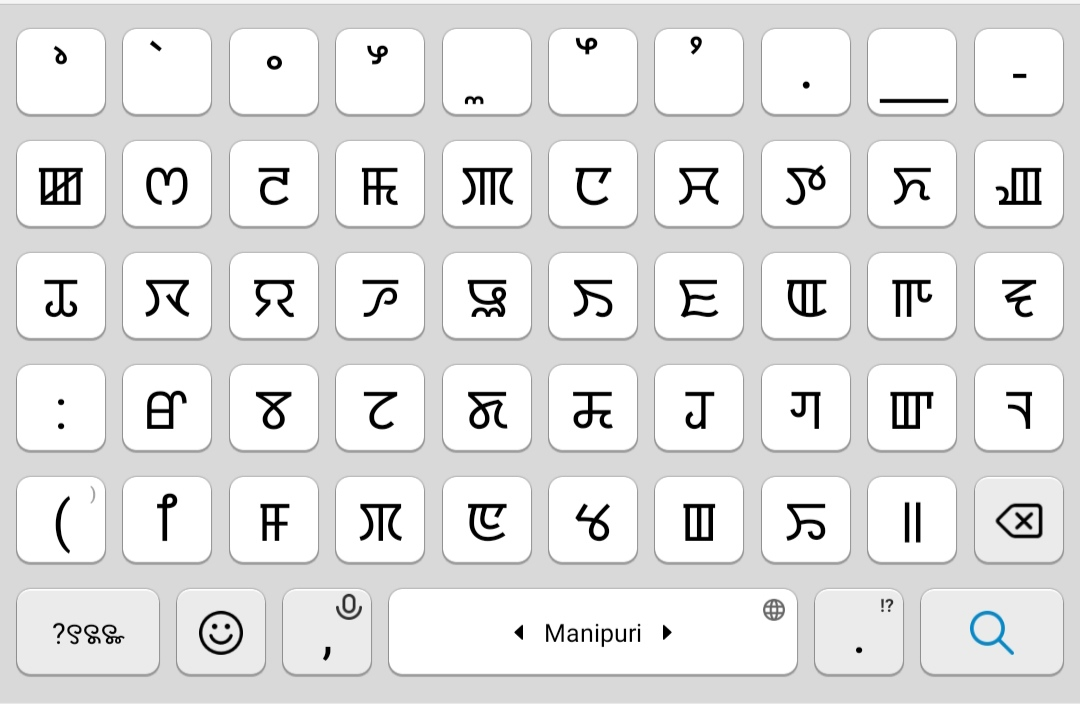
A typical Meitei Mayek keyboard

Meitei Mayek keyboards and other input methods are available at or supported by:

- Gboard
- Apple iOS 13
- Linux
- Macintosh operating systems
- Microsoft SwiftKey
- Windows

== In popular culture ==
- The Living God: Medicine and The Ancient Meetei Civilization, 2015 documentary film

== See also ==
- Meitei inscriptions
- List of Meitei-language newspapers
- Meetei Mayek (Unicode block)
- Meetei Mayek Extensions (Unicode block)
- Wikipedia:Meitei script display help
- Bengali–Assamese script
- Bengali alphabet
- Mayek (disambiguation)

== Bibliography ==
- Chelliah, Shobhana L. (1997). A grammar of Meithei. Berlin: Mouton de Gruyter. ISBN 0-19-564331-3.
- Chelliah, Shobhana L. (2002). Early Meithei manuscripts. In C. I. Beckwith (Ed.), Medieval Tibeto-Burman languages: PIATS 2000: Tibetan studies: Proceedings of the ninth seminar of the International Association of Tibetan Studies, Leiden 2000 (pp. 59–71). Leiden, Netherlands: Brill.
- Chelliah, Shobhana L. (2002). A glossary of 39 basic words in archaic and modern Meithei. In C. I. Beckwith (Ed.), Medieval Tibeto-Burman languages: PIATS 2000: Tibetan studies: Proceedings of the ninth seminar of the International Association of Tibetan Studies, Leiden 2000 (pp. 189–190). Leiden, Netherlands: Brill.
