= Meetei Mayek Extensions =

- Range: U+AAE0..U+AAFF (32 code points)
- Plane: BMP
- Scripts: Meetei Mayek
- Major alphabets: historical Meetei
- Assigned: 23 code points
- Unused: 9 reserved code points

Unicode version history
- 6.1 (2012): 23 (+23)

Unicode documentation
- Code chart ∣ Web page

Meetei Mayek Extensions are extensions to the Meetei Mayek (Unicode block) containing characters for historic Meitei language orthographies.

Meetei Mayek Extensions^{[1]}^{[2]} Official Unicode Consortium code chart (PDF)
	0	1	2	3	4	5	6	7	8	9	A	B	C	D	E	F
U+AAEx	ꫠ	ꫡ	ꫢ	ꫣ	ꫤ	ꫥ	ꫦ	ꫧ	ꫨ	ꫩ	ꫪ	ꫫ	ꫬ	ꫭ	ꫮ	ꫯ
U+AAFx	꫰	꫱	ꫲ	ꫳ	ꫴ	ꫵ	꫶									
Notes: 1. As of Unicode version 16.0; 2. Grey areas indicate non-assigned code points

== History ==
The following Unicode-related documents record the purpose and process of defining specific characters in the Meetei Mayek Extensions block:

Version	Final code points (Note: Proposed code points and characters names may differ from final code points and names)	Count	L2 ID	WG2 ID	Document
6.1	U+AAE0..AAF6	23	L2/99-245	N2042	Everson, Michael; McGowan, Rick (20 July 1999), Unicode Technical Report #3: Early Aramaic, Balti, Kirat (Limbu), Manipuri (Meitei) and Tai Lü scripts
6.1	U+AAE0..AAF6	23	L2/00-259		Meetei Mayek script sample, 9 August 2000
6.1	U+AAE0..AAF6	23	L2/01-457		Khumancha, Michael (7 November 2001), Letter from Michael Khumancha to UTC: "Meetei/Meitei mayek book and newspaper"
6.1	U+AAE0..AAF6	23	L2/06-308	N3158	Everson, Michael (20 September 2006), Preliminary proposal for encoding the Meithei Mayek script in the BMP
6.1	U+AAE0..AAF6	23	L2/07-015		Moore, Lisa (8 February 2007), "Meitei Mayek (C.15)", UTC #110 Minutes
6.1	U+AAE0..AAF6	23		N3353 (pdf, doc)	Umamaheswaran, V. S. (10 October 2007), "M51.6, M51.7", Unconfirmed minutes of WG 2 meeting 51 Hanzhou, China; 2007-04-24/27
6.1	U+AAE0..AAF6	23	L2/07-256		Singh, L. S.; Singh, S. I. (3 August 2007), Views of Manipuri University on Meitei Script proposal
6.1	U+AAE0..AAF6	23	L2/07-005R2	N3206R2	Everson, Michael (7 August 2007), Proposal for encoding the Meitei Mayek script in the BMP of the UCS
6.1	U+AAE0..AAF6	23	L2/07-311	N3327	Anderson, Deborah (10 September 2007), Comments on Meitei Dandas
6.1	U+AAE0..AAF6	23	L2/08-136		Singh, M. Chandramani (5 March 2008), Unicode for Meetei Script
6.1	U+AAE0..AAF6	23	L2/08-180	N3470	Updated proposal to encode Meetei Mayek in the UCS, 24 April 2008
6.1	U+AAE0..AAF6	23	L2/08-233		Lata, Swaran (29 April 2008), Letter from Government of Manipur to Swaran Lata, Gov't of India
6.1	U+AAE0..AAF6	23	L2/08-221		Lata, Swaran (14 May 2008), 7 scanned pages of pre-1980 Meetei Mayek
6.1	U+AAE0..AAF6	23	L2/08-242		Moore, Lisa (18 June 2008), Letter from Lisa Moore to M. Chandramani Singh, Gov't of Manipur
6.1	U+AAE0..AAF6	23	L2/08-291		Singh, L. Mahabir (6 August 2008), Proceeding of Meeting of Meetei Mayek Expert Committee Held on 17-07-2008
6.1	U+AAE0..AAF6	23	L2/08-317		Muller, Eric (11 August 2008), "3", South Asia Subcommittee Report
6.1	U+AAE0..AAF6	23	L2/08-232R	N3473R	Proposed Encoding for Meetei Mayek Block, 12 August 2008
6.1	U+AAE0..AAF6	23	L2/08-239R	N3478R	Proposed Encoding for Meetei Mayek Extended Block, 12 August 2008
6.1	U+AAE0..AAF6	23	L2/08-318	N3453 (pdf, doc)	Umamaheswaran, V. S. (13 August 2008), "M52.6", Unconfirmed minutes of WG 2 meeting 52
6.1	U+AAE0..AAF6	23	L2/08-340		Moore, Lisa (11 September 2008), Letter from Lisa Moore to L Mahabir Singh (Government of Manipur)
6.1	U+AAE0..AAF6	23	L2/08-161R2		Moore, Lisa (5 November 2008), "Meetei Mayek", UTC #115 Minutes
6.1	U+AAE0..AAF6	23	L2/09-234	N3603 (pdf, doc)	Umamaheswaran, V. S. (8 July 2009), "10.24", Unconfirmed minutes of WG 2 meeting 54
6.1	U+AAE0..AAF6	23		N3703 (pdf, doc)	Umamaheswaran, V. S. (13 April 2010), "M55.23", Unconfirmed minutes of WG 2 meeting no. 55, Tokyo 2009-10-26/30
6.1	U+AAE0..AAF6	23	L2/09-335R		Moore, Lisa (10 November 2009), "Consensus 121-C19", UTC #121 / L2 #218 Minutes
6.1	U+AAE0..AAF6	23	L2/13-072		Jain, Manoj (25 April 2013), Letter from Rajendra Kumar to Mark Davis re Meetei Mayek encoding
6.1	U+AAE0..AAF6	23	L2/13-073		Proceedings of the meeting of Language/Meetei Mayek Expert Committee held on 17/11/2012, 26 April 2013
6.1	U+AAE0..AAF6	23	L2/13-078		Singh, H. Mathang (26 April 2013), Meetei Mayek in Unicode Standard (email)
6.1	U+AAE0..AAF6	23	L2/13-162		Moore, Lisa (24 July 2013), Unicode Response on Meetei Mayek
