= Kohima Stone =

Monument of Gambhir Singh of Manipur kingdom

Kohima Stone Inscription
- (Meitei: Kohima Khut-ee Nungpak)
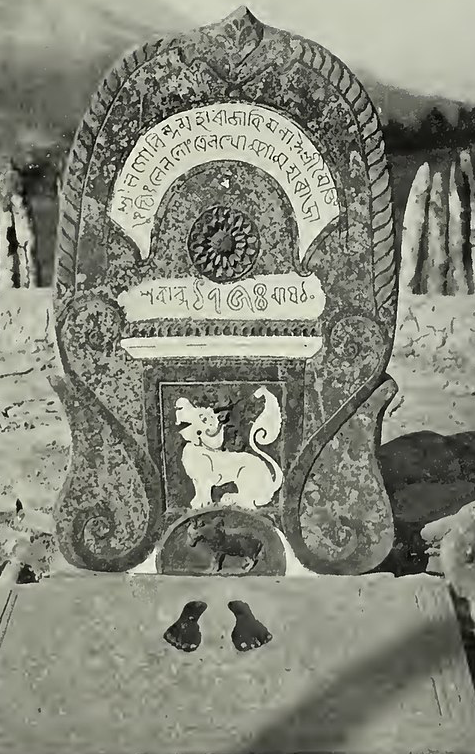
- The Kohima Stone erected by Raja Gambhir Singh (Chinglen Nongdrenkhomba) of Manipur.
- Type: Meitei inscription
- Material: stone
- Writing: Sanskritised Meitei language (in Bengali-Assamese script)
- Symbols: Kanglasha (dragon lion), a bull and the footprints of Gambhir Singh
- Created: 1833 AD
- Discovered: Kohima, Nagaland
- Present location: Nagaland State Museum, Kohima, Nagaland
- Classification: Meitei inscription
- Culture: Meitei culture

The Kohima Stone or Gambhir Singh's Stone is a historical Meitei stone inscription monument, erected by Meitei King Gambhir Singh (Chinglen Nongdrenkhomba) of Manipur (princely state) in Kohima, the capital of Nagaland. It was erected in 1833 as a mark of Manipuri conquest of the Kohima in 1832. It is inscribed in sanskritised Manipuri (Meitei) in Bengali-Assamese script. Manipuri King Gambhir Singh and the powerful Manipuri Levy conquered the whole of the Naga Hills. The stone was erected after his final victory over the Angami people of Kohima.

== History ==
Manipuri influence over the Naga ethnic groups declined during the period before and after the Burmese war of 1819–25. However, it was re-asserted by Gambhir Singh. At Kohima, he stood on a flat stone and had his footprints sculpted on it as a token of conquest. Kohima and its surrounding villages were the boundaries of Manipur Kingdom.

The stone is frequently mentioned in land laws and orders announced by the later British government of the Naga Hills.
