= The Living God: Medicine and The Ancient Meetei Civilization =

- A poster of "The Living God- Medicine and The Ancient Meetei Civilization"
- Directed by: Prakas Aheibam
- Written by: Prakas Aheibam
- Based on: Medicine and the Ancient Meitei civilization (Ancient Kangleipak)
- Produced by: Prakas Aheibam
- Starring: Prakash Aheibam
- Release date: 2015
- Running time: 30 minutes
- Country: India
- Language: English
- Budget: 1,000 USD

The Living God: Medicine and The Ancient Meetei Civilization is a 2015 English language short documentary film written and directed by Prakas Aheibam. It is based on the medicine and the ancient Meitei civilization (ancient Kangleipak).

This documentary film was produced by a resourceless staff who were deeply conscious and appreciative of ancient forgotten human values for the revival. It initiates the information about unknown things and unsuspected resources of ancient civilizations and the hugely deep and materialistic modern times casting their shadow upon them. It shows the undiscovered knowledge as well as the unending ways and resources of the universe known to man only through deeply spiritual and considering great forces.

== Background ==
Meetei Civilization (Ancient Kangleipak), in the present day Northeast India bordering Myanmar (Burma), is a civilization still unknown to most of the world. Meitei script, its ancient script is the representation of the well developed nature of its civilization. The form, structure and phonology of the ancient Meitei writing system show the understanding of human physiology. The ancient Puyas record their ancient knowledge on many subjects including astrology, astronomy, genetics, human physiology, medicine, oracles (predictions), abiogenesis (origin of life), cosmogony (study of the origin of the universe), and the secrets of life and death. The ancient Meitei writings also deal with the relationship between Lai (Meitei term for God) and human beings. Even in present-day times, the mixed relationship between the two entities are celebrated in the Lai Haraoba (festivals of Gods). Standing against the burning of Puyas (Puya Mei Thaba), many of these ancient writings still survive even today. The medicine of this ancient civilization is considered as an inheritance from the Lai (Meitei term for God). The descendent people of the ancient civilization still continue to cure as well as treat many modern diseases and illnesses with the healing power of the ancient medicine.

Prakas Aheibam, the director of the movie, has interests of antiques, artifacts and folktales since his childhood. Like many people of his age, he grew up hearing about the historic golden era of Meitei culture. So, he wished for studying for the then unknown world of Meetei Civilization (Ancient Kangleipak). In the year 2006, he saw a miraculous healing effect of the ancient Meitei medical science. It was when his father was suffering from a disease. So, he got more curious to learn about ancient Meitei culture and society. At the same time, one of his friends introduced him to the illustrated human physiology that formed the structure and phonology of revived ancient Meitei script. For almost a decade, Prakas Aheibam dedicated to study for the different aspects of the ancient Meetei Civilization (Ancient Kangleipak).

== International receptions ==
The movie received official entries in many international film festivals across the world. These include:

Film festivals	Seasons	Venues	Category
Los Angeles Independent Film Festival Awards	April, 2015	Los Angeles	Best Foreign Documentary (Short), Best original music
International Film Festival for Peace, Inspiration, and Equality	2015	Jakarta, Indonesia	International Awards of Merit, Special Award :Humanitarian Awards 2015 (category - International Awards for Merit), Finalists Most Favorite Film 2015
Los Angeles CineFest	2015	Los Angeles	official selection
Ozark Shorts - Monthly Film Screening Series	2016	Lamar, Missouri, United States	official selection
Ekurhuleni International Film Festival	2016	Benoni, South Africa	official selection
The CreActive International Open Film Festival (IOFF)	2016	Dhaka, Bangladesh	semi-finalist
Phoenix Film Festival Melbourne	2016	Melbourne, Australia	official selection
Hollywood International Independent Documentary Awards	August, 2016	United States	Foreign Documentary Short Award
12 Months Film Festival	2016	Cluj-Napoca, Romania	official selection
The International Peace and Film Festival	2017	Las Vegas, United States	official selection

== Accolades ==
"The Living God: Medicine and The Ancient Meetei Civilization" won multiple awards and honours from many international film festivals held across the globe. It won the "Best Foreign Short Documentary" and the "Best Original Music" at the "Los Angeles Independent Film Festival" for the month of April. Its screening and awarding was held on 9 May 2015 in Los Angeles. This documentary also got official selection for the "Los Angeles CineFest" in the same year.

In the International Film Festival for Peace, Inspiration, and Equality 2015, "The Living God: Medicine and The Ancient Meetei Civilization" won two awards. It won the "Humanitarian Award" and the "Merit Award". In the same festival, it was also designated as the "Finalists Most Favorite Film 2015".

In the "Hollywood International Independent Documentary Awards 2016", "The Living God: Medicine and The Ancient Meetei Civilization" won the Best Foreign Documentary (Short) Award.

== See also ==
- Daughters of the Polo God
- My Japanese Niece
