= Meitei inscriptions =

Inscriptions of Meitei language

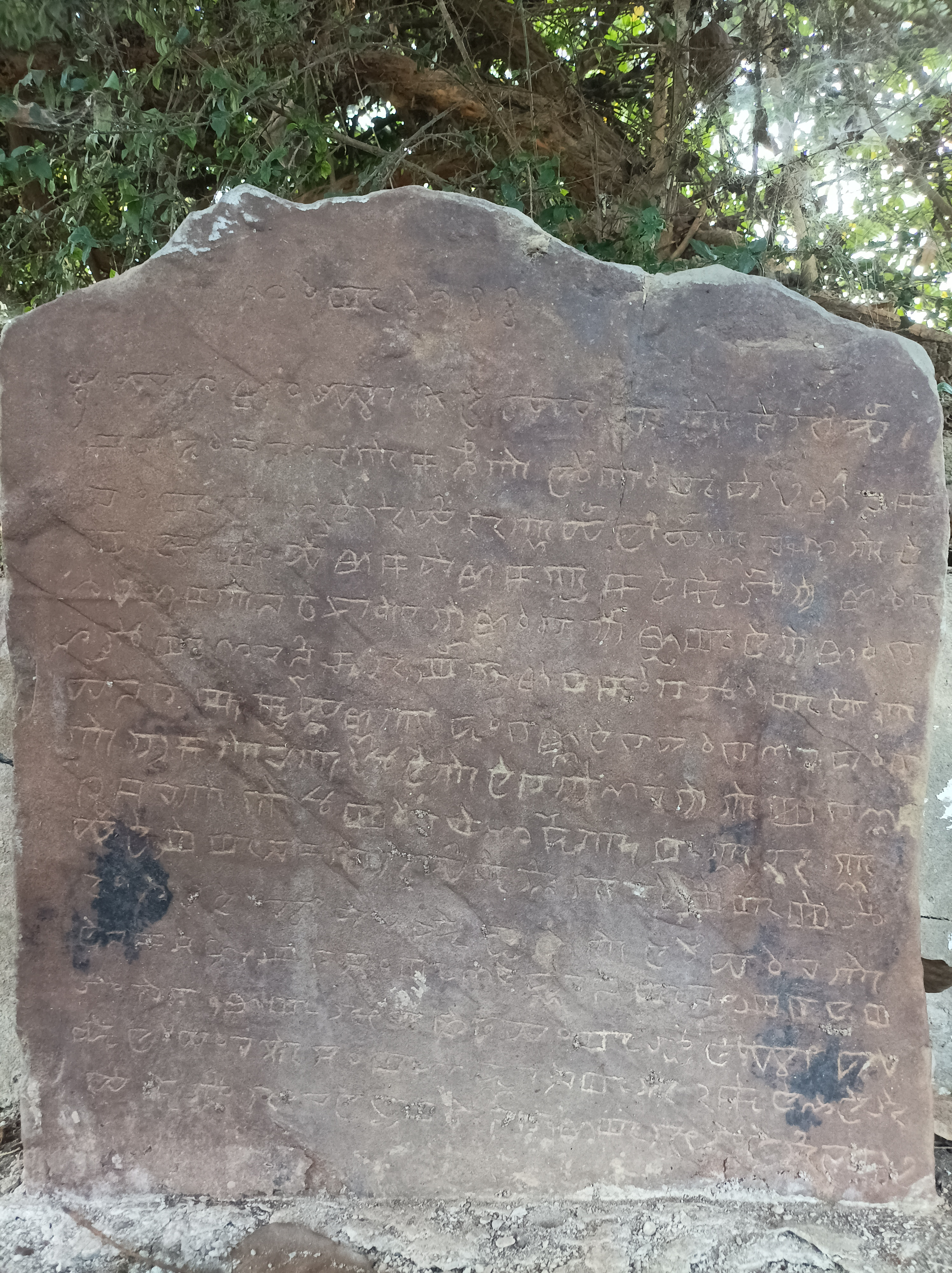
A Meitei language stone inscription in Meitei script about a royal decree of a Meitei king found in the sacred site of Meitei God Panam Ningthou in Andro, Imphal East, Manipur.

Meitei inscriptions (Meitei: ꯃꯩꯇꯩꯒꯤ ꯂꯥꯢꯔꯤꯛ ꯏꯕ ꯅꯨꯡꯁꯤꯡ) are Meitei language inscriptions cut into stone slabs. They are a major source of information about the ancient history of the Meitei people and the kingdom of Kangleipak. They are mainly found in the hills as well as the plains of present-day Manipur, India. They were written using either the Meitei script or the Bengali script.

== List of inscriptions ==
=== Konthoujam Lairembi stone relic ===
The site of Konthoujam Lairembi hosts one of the most important archaeological treasures of not just Manipur but of the entire Indo-Burma region. Believed to be more than two thousand years old, a small stone with a width of two feet and length of three feet emerges from the ground. However, what is of austerity of this small relic is that it is being inscribed in Meitei script that is yet to be recognized though some language experts had claimed to have successfully deciphered it. Nevertheless, those who claimed to have read the scribbling had never revealed what is being written. On the other hand, a local of the village claimed that as of today, none of the language experts including members of a prominent Meitei language body have been able to read the script, stating the letters are not identified.

=== Inscriptions of Gambhir Singh and Nara Singh ===
An inscription of Gambhir Singh made in 1928 and one of Nara Singh made in 1843 are situated at the 1st Manipur Rifles complex at Haying Khongban in Imphal. They are said to be in a dilapidated condition and the State Archeology Department is waiting for the experts from the Archeological Survey of India to restore them. In the past, when Manipur was a kingdom, Manipuri soldiers used to pray and seek blessings from the sacred monuments before going to wars.

=== Pamheiba Stone Inscription of Bangai Range ===
A stone inscription of Pamheiba (commonly known as Gharib Niwaz) is located near Tipaimukh on the slopes of Vangaitang range in Pherzawl district. The stone gives illustration of weapons and equipments used in warfare, which is of historical value The inscription 58 X 56 cm and written in Meitei script. It includes certain words associated with Hinduism. The stone has suffered damage in the past and continues degeneration, according to archaeologist Mutua Bahadur.

The Pamheiba inscription distinguishes itself from other rock edicts. The illustration showed pictures of spears, bows, elephants, horses, the dart weapon – Arambai and Nongmei Ashubi.

Manipur Royal Chronicle, Cheitharol Kumbaba, corroborates the narration of Pamheiba's inscription which was raised during his battle against the Tripuris known to Manipuris as Takhel. It stated that Pamheiba and his troops made their camp at this site to establish his authority in the interior area now located in Pherzawl district. The Royal Chronicle termed the Bangai Range as "Mangaitang Chingsang". It stated that Pamheiba in 1734 camped at this site in his victorious war against the Tripuris, as per Mutua Bahadur.

=== Four stones of Tarao Pal ===
Four stone inscriptions with the oldest one being dated to the reign of King Urakonthouba in the 6th century and the latest being to the period of King Gambhir Singh were discovered beginning 1974 in Chandel district.

One of the stone inscriptions at Tarao Pal dates back to King Kiyamba (1467-1508). Measuring 24.5X13 cm, the inscription in archaic Meitei script instructs that stealing of animals and taking of slaves cannot be tolerated from the village, and that the village serves as the Eastern guard of Manipur state. A temple was also built in its vicinity, as per one of the deciphered lines, as per Mutua Bahadur. While deciphering of the whole script is impossible due to degeneration, the deciphered statement was arrived from the four lines inscribed in the stone. It during the period of King Kiyamba that the Kabaw Valley was annexed to the kingdom of Manipur after a joint successful military expedition with the King Khekhomba of the ethnic Shan, known to as Pong to the Meeteis, following which Ningthi Turel or present day Chindwin River was established as the eastern political boundary of the erstwhile Manipur kingdom.

Another stone attributed to King Kiyamba with a width of 15 cm and a height of 14 cm, having 5 lines is also to be found in which it was declared that it was the decree of Godly king Kiyamba that slaves cannot be taken from Tarao Pal.

Maharaj Gambhir Singh stone inscription measures 22 cm in width and has a height of 20 cm. Written in archaic Meetei script, 7 lines are inscribed in the stone at Tarao Pal in Chandel district, of which some could not be deciphered.

=== Three stone inscriptions of Khoibu ===
Three stone inscriptions were also discovered in Khoibu village along the Indo-Myanmar border and assumes one of the most important archaeological evidences to prove that the erstwhile Manipur kingdom was not confined to Imphal valley. Located near the vicinity of Kabaw Valley, Khoibu is a small village situated in the hill route connecting Imphal and Burma.

Prof. Gangmumei Kabui says that the issuing of the first stone was attributed to King Sameirang and his brother Thamanglang in the 5th century and was inscribed in Meetei script. The script mentioned that the border village in Indo-Myanmar border village was protected by the two brothers. The second stone was issued by King Kiyamba in the 15th century. The inscription, written in archaic Meetei script has a width of 2"-9", a thickness of 3" and height of 3" 2". Free translation of the old Meetei language states that it was the decree of Godly king Kiyamba that the village of Khoibu was to be exempted from tributes and its inhabitants are not to be tortured. The Third Stone inscription has been attributed to the period of King Paikhomba who ruled in the 17th century. Of the deciphered 16 lines, the text maintains that Paikhomba raised the stone and that Khoibu village is the keeper of the deity under the decree of godly king Kiyamba. The village was also to be exempted from state duties, not to be tortured and from Lallup service. Nevertheless, presence of such archaeologically important rock edicts clearly establishes the authority of earlier rulers.

== Bibliography ==
- Mutum, Ratna (2020), "The Old Stone Inscriptions of Manipur with Special Reference to Konthoujam Lairemma Stone Inscription", The Cultural Heritage of Manipur, Routledge
