= Andro, Imphal East =

Andro
- town
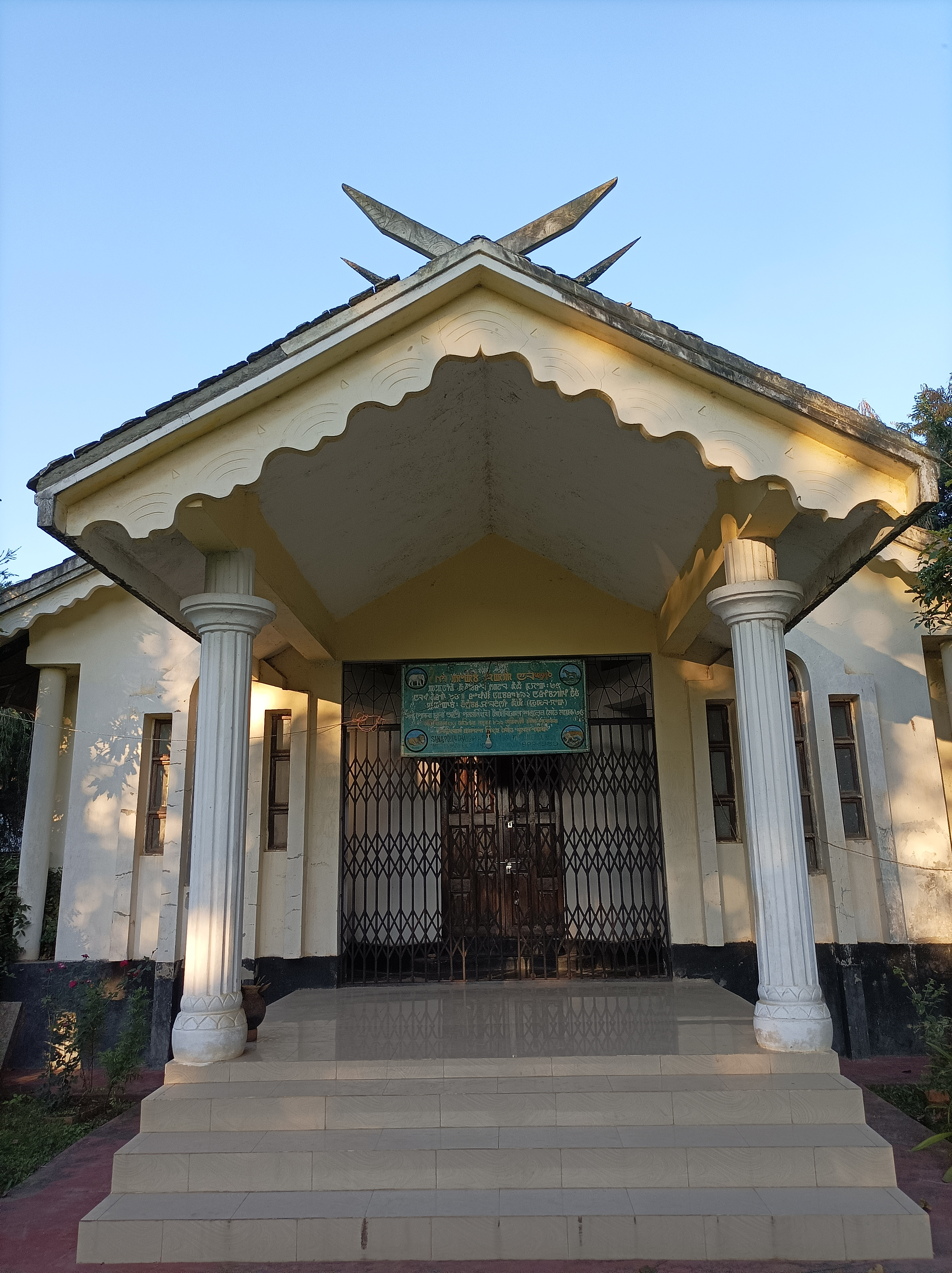
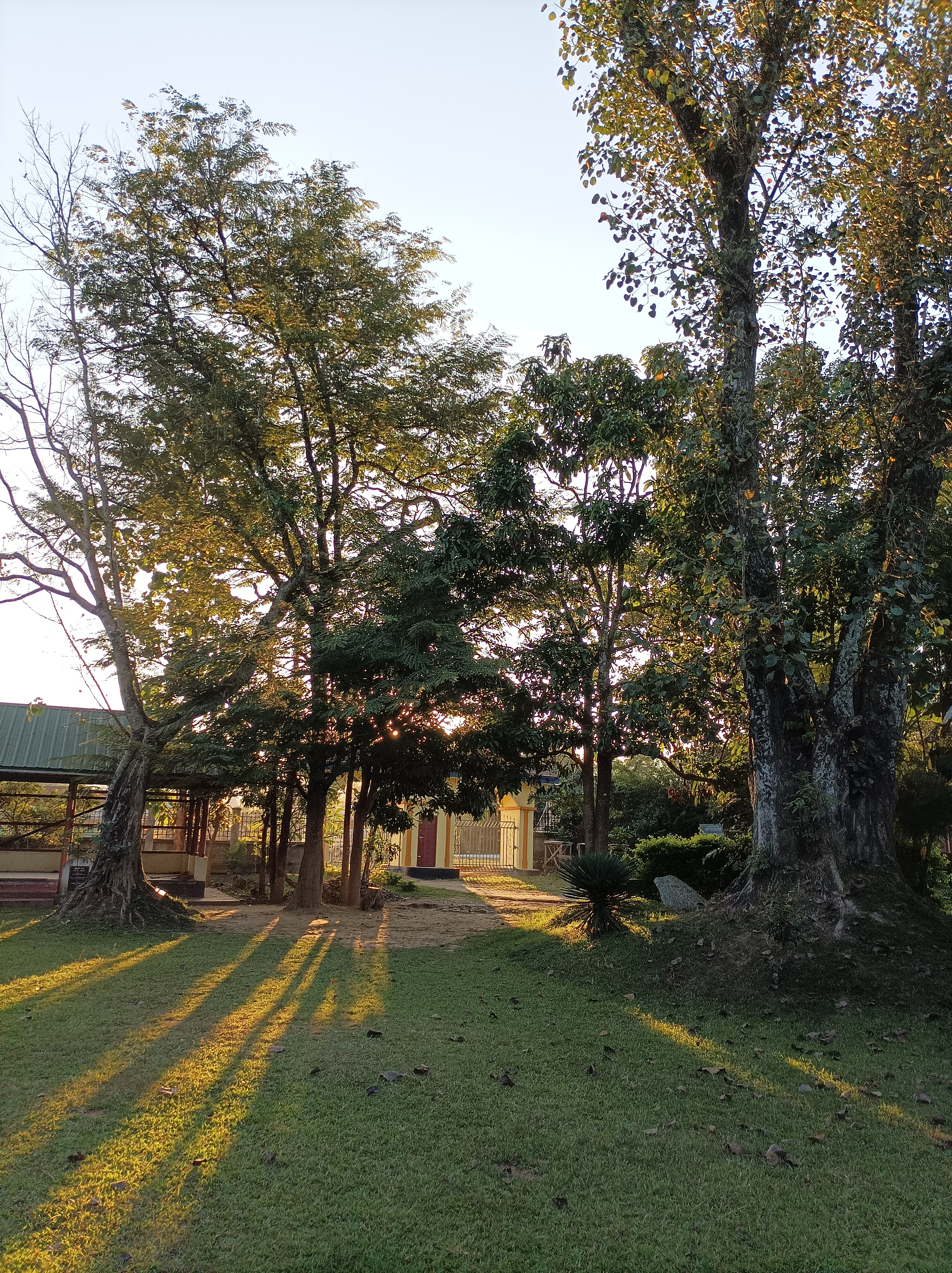
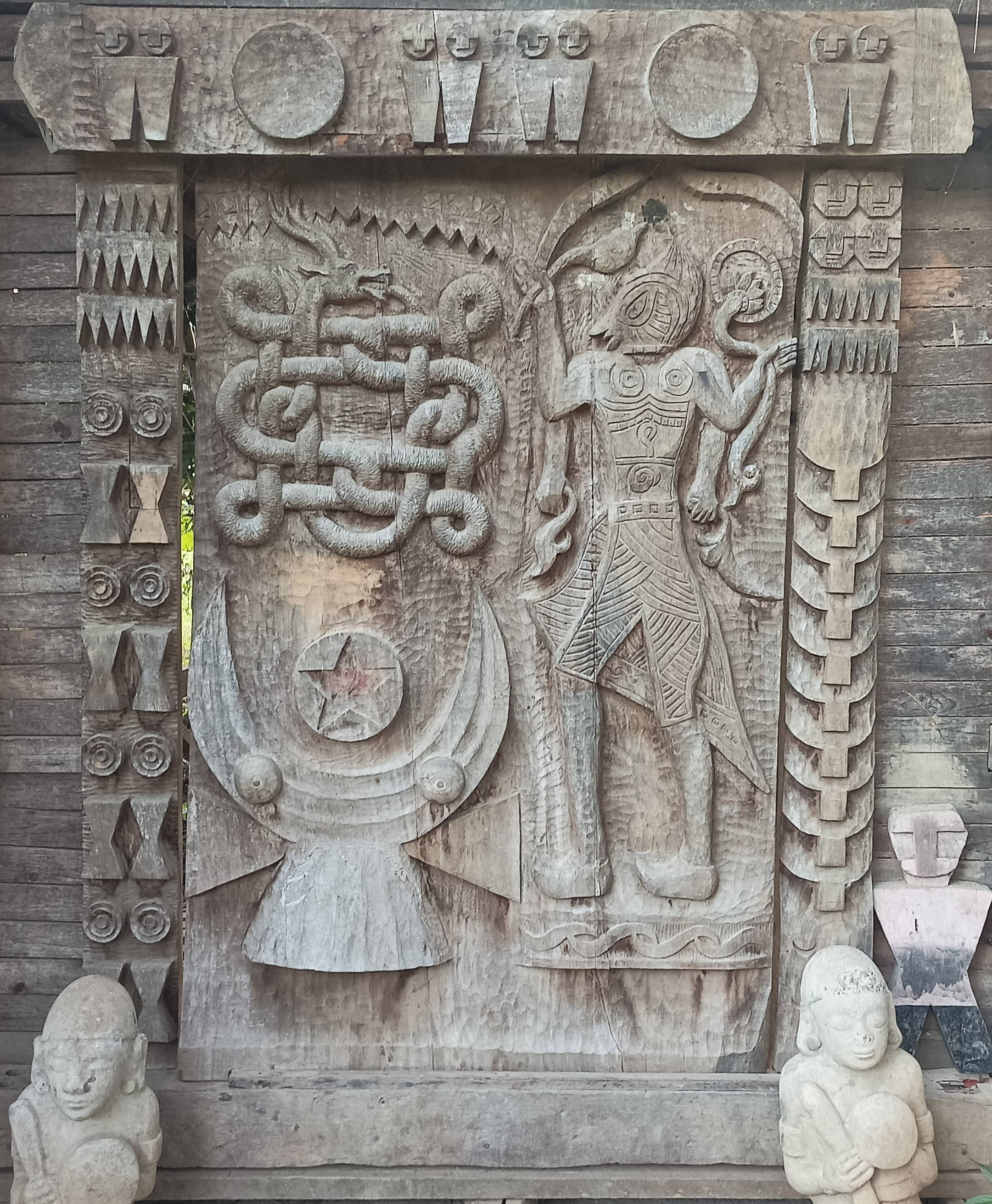
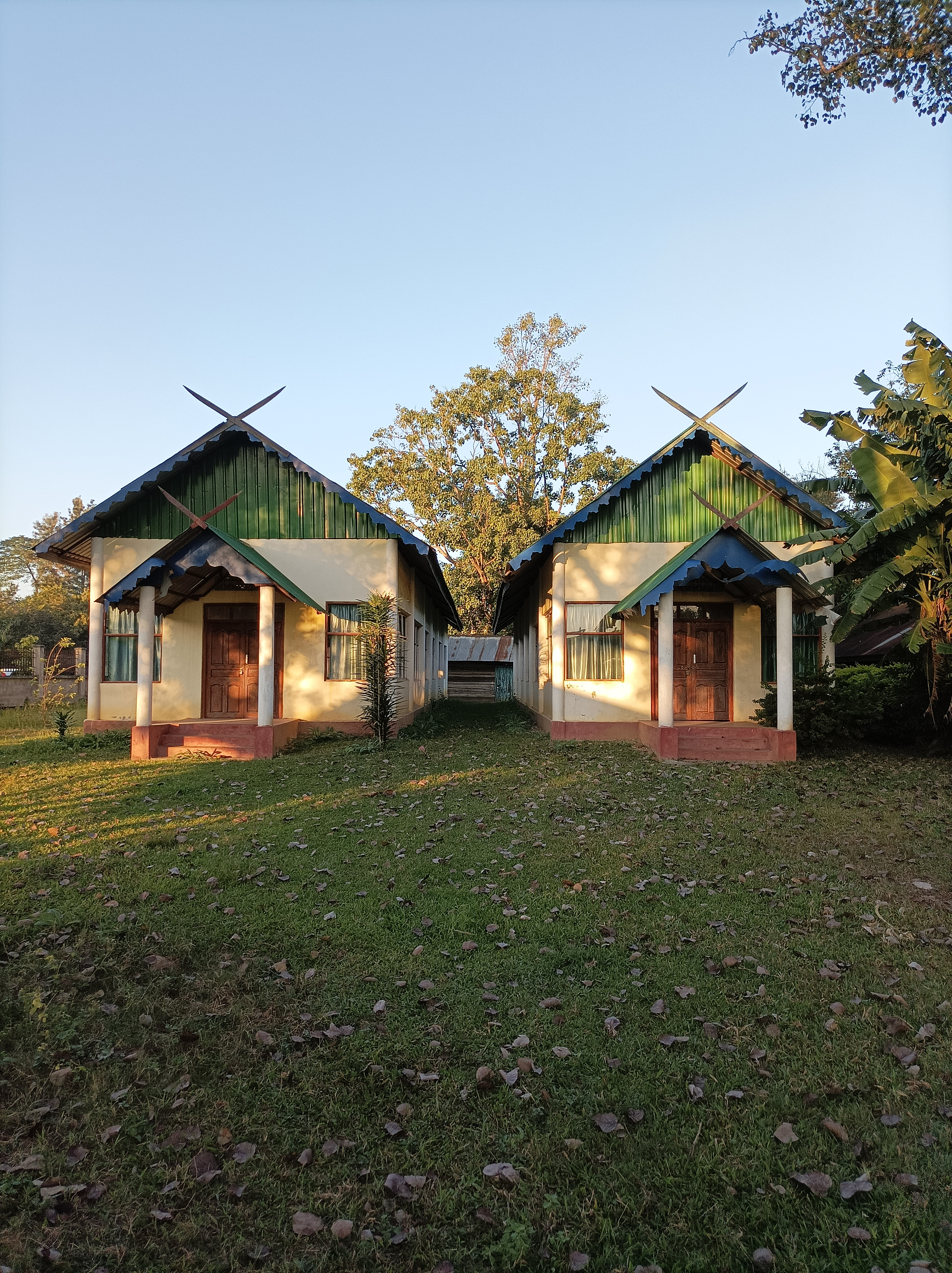
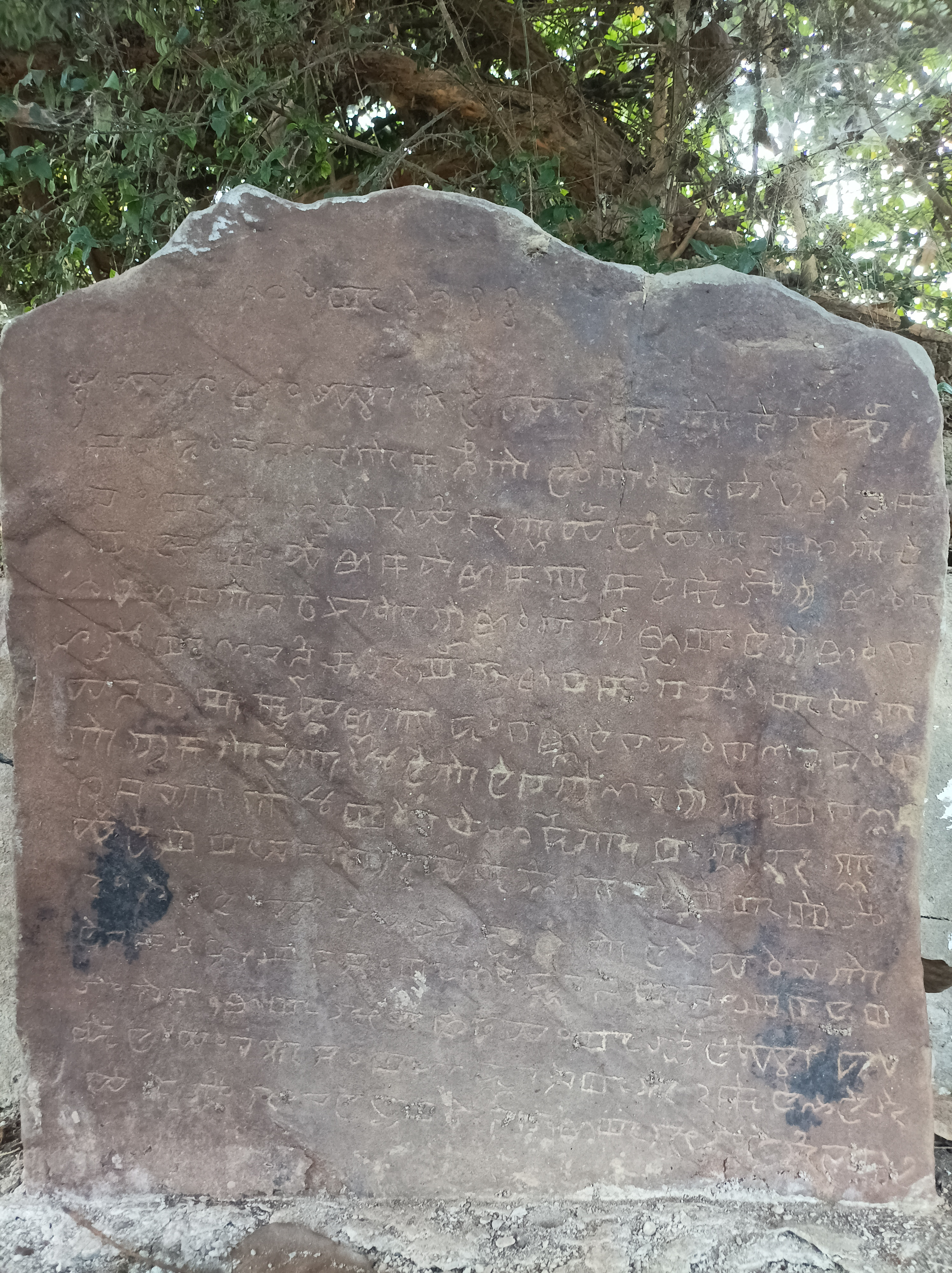
- Clockwise from top: A temple (rebuilt) dedicated to God Panam Ningthou, a sacred grove (Umang Lai shrine), relief carvings and sculptures in the "Cultural Heritage Complex" of "Andro Museum", a historic Meitei inscription about a royal decree, twin cultural institutional houses

- Location in Manipur, India Andro (India)
- Coordinates: 24.777273°N 94.06322°E
- Country: India
- State: Manipur
- District: Imphal East

Population (2001)
  - Total: 8,313

Languages
  - Official: Meitei
- Time zone: UTC+5:30 (IST)
- Vehicle registration: MN

Andro is a village and a nagar panchayat in Imphal East district in the state of Manipur, India.

Andro is an earmarked Scheduled Caste village that has been developed to represent the cultural heritage and artful creativeness of the Manipuri tribes. Located at a distance of 25 km towards the east of Imphal, Andro creates an authentic Manipuri village along with the cultural complex established and run by the Mutua Museum Imphal. This complex encompasses varieties of pottery creations from northeastern India. The doll house of the complex has been imaginatively developed by displaying 29 different types of dolls that represent the cross-cultural mix of Manipuri tribes across the region. Authentic Manipuri pottery can be purchased, and even a few tricks of trade can be learned at the town.

== Pottery ==
Andro is a small hamlet located towards the east of Imphal and is popularly known for its pottery.

This village is home to the Andro Gramshang Museum, which comprises different varieties of traditional pots, namely, Pudond Makhong, Walom, Ngangkha and Yukhum. Among other varieties are Wangkham, Kambi, Kambi Makhong Panb,a and Eshaiphu. Pottery can only be done by the married women of Andro Traditional methods of pottery are replaced with a flat stone and a bat, which is used to beat the mud into a required shape. Along with pots, the women also make vases, piggy banks, and lamps Apart from pottery, Andro is also famous for adollhHouse, which showcases dolls belonging to 29 popular Manipuri tribes.

== Transportation ==
This small village has also witnessed a certain level of development in terms of transportation facilities. Travellers can easily avail buses, cycles, auto-rickshaws and taxis to access different locations. The suitable time to visit Andro is from the months of October to February, when the climate is pleasant.

== Demographics ==
As of 2001 India census, Andro had a population of 8313. Males constitute 50% of the population and females 50%. Andro has an average literacy rate of 47%, lower than the national average of 59.5%, with 56% of the males and 44% of females literate. 16% of the population is under 6 years of age.

== Politics ==
Andro is part of Inner Manipur (Lok Sabha constituency).
