= Meetei Mayek (Unicode block) =

- Range: U+ABC0..U+ABFF (64 code points)
- Plane: BMP
- Scripts: Meetei Mayek
- Major alphabets: Meetei
- Assigned: 56 code points
- Unused: 8 reserved code points

Unicode Version History
- 5.2 (2009): 56 (+56)

Unicode documentation
- Code chart ∣ Web page

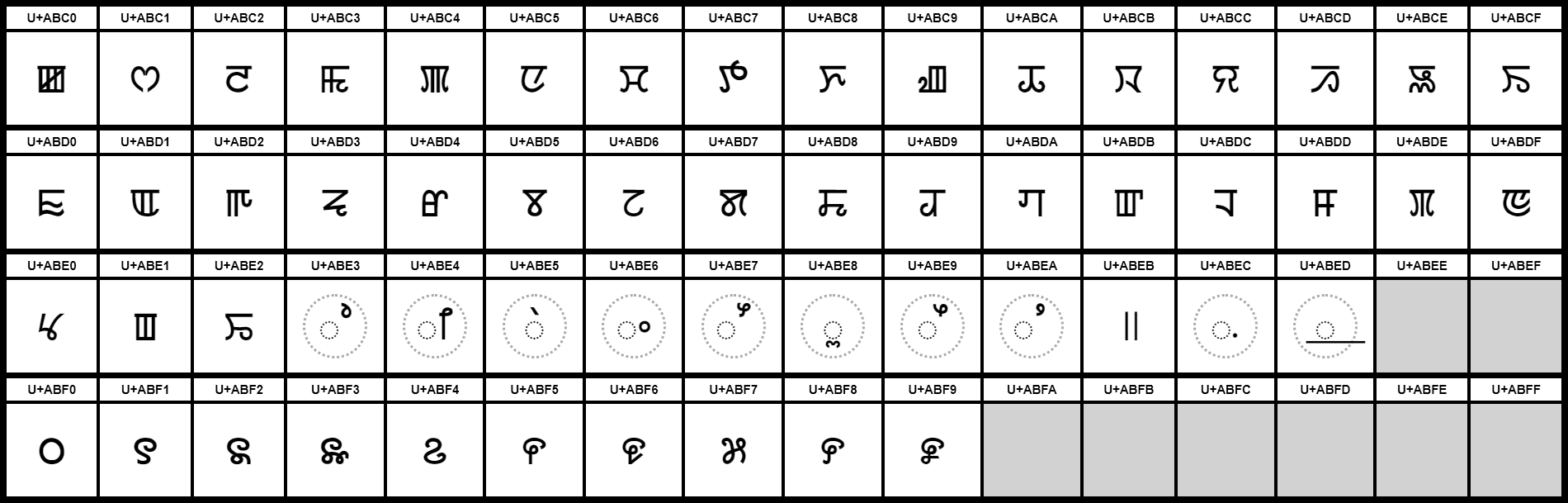
Graphical representation of the Meetei Mayek Unicode block

Meetei Mayek is a Unicode block containing characters for writing the Meitei language of Manipur, India.

Meetei Mayek^{[1]}^{[2]} Official Unicode Consortium code chart (PDF)
	0	1	2	3	4	5	6	7	8	9	A	B	C	D	E	F
U+ABCx	ꯀ	ꯁ	ꯂ	ꯃ	ꯄ	ꯅ	ꯆ	ꯇ	ꯈ	ꯉ	ꯊ	ꯋ	ꯌ	ꯍ	ꯎ	ꯏ
U+ABDx	ꯐ	ꯑ	ꯒ	ꯓ	ꯔ	ꯕ	ꯖ	ꯗ	ꯘ	ꯙ	ꯚ	ꯛ	ꯜ	ꯝ	ꯞ	ꯟ
U+ABEx	ꯠ	ꯡ	ꯢ	ꯣ	ꯤ	ꯥ	ꯦ	ꯧ	ꯨ	ꯩ	ꯪ	꯫	꯬	꯭		
U+ABFx	꯰	꯱	꯲	꯳	꯴	꯵	꯶	꯷	꯸	꯹						
Notes 1.As of Unicode version 18.0 2.Grey areas indicate non-assigned code points

== History ==
The following Unicode-related documents record the purpose and process of defining specific characters in the Meetei Mayek block:

Version	Final code points (Note: Proposed code points and characters names may differ from final code points and names)	Count	L2 ID	WG2 ID	Document
5.2	U+ABC0..ABED, ABF0..ABF9	56	L2/99-245	N2042	Everson, Michael; McGowan, Rick (20 July 1999), Unicode Technical Report #3: Early Aramaic, Balti, Kirat (Limbu), Manipuri (Meitei) and Tai Lü scripts
5.2	U+ABC0..ABED, ABF0..ABF9	56	L2/00-259		Meetei Mayek script sample, 9 August 2000
5.2	U+ABC0..ABED, ABF0..ABF9	56	L2/01-457		Khumancha, Michael (7 November 2001), Letter from Michael Khumancha to UTC: "Meetei/Meitei mayek book and newspaper"
5.2	U+ABC0..ABED, ABF0..ABF9	56	L2/06-308	N3158	Everson, Michael (20 September 2006), Preliminary proposal for encoding the Meithei Mayek script in the BMP
5.2	U+ABC0..ABED, ABF0..ABF9	56	L2/07-015		Moore, Lisa (8 February 2007), "Meitei Mayek (C.15)", UTC #110 Minutes
5.2	U+ABC0..ABED, ABF0..ABF9	56		N3353 (pdf, doc)	Umamaheswaran, V. S. (10 October 2007), "M51.6, M51.7", Unconfirmed minutes of WG 2 meeting 51 Hanzhou, China; 2007-04-24/27
5.2	U+ABC0..ABED, ABF0..ABF9	56	L2/07-268	N3253 (pdf, doc)	Umamaheswaran, V. S. (26 July 2007), "M50.33", Unconfirmed minutes of WG 2 meeting 50, Frankfurt-am-Main, Germany; 2007-04-24/27
5.2	U+ABC0..ABED, ABF0..ABF9	56	L2/07-256		Singh, L. S.; Singh, S. I. (3 August 2007), Views of Manipuri University on Meitei Script proposal
5.2	U+ABC0..ABED, ABF0..ABF9	56	L2/07-005R2	N3206R2	Everson, Michael (7 August 2007), Proposal for encoding the Meitei Mayek script in the BMP of the UCS
5.2	U+ABC0..ABED, ABF0..ABF9	56	L2/07-272		Muller, Eric (10 August 2007), "3", Report of the South Asia subcommittee
5.2	U+ABC0..ABED, ABF0..ABF9	56	L2/07-311	N3327	Anderson, Deborah (10 September 2007), Comments on Meitei Dandas
5.2	U+ABC0..ABED, ABF0..ABF9	56	L2/08-136		Singh, M. Chandramani (5 March 2008), Unicode for Meetei Script
5.2	U+ABC0..ABED, ABF0..ABF9	56	L2/08-180	N3470	Updated proposal to encode Meetei Mayek in the UCS, 24 April 2008
5.2	U+ABC0..ABED, ABF0..ABF9	56	L2/08-233		Lata, Swaran (29 April 2008), Letter from Government of Manipur to Swaran Lata, Gov't of India
5.2	U+ABC0..ABED, ABF0..ABF9	56	L2/08-218		Muller, Eric (12 May 2008), "5", South Asia Subcommittee Report - Monday May 12, 2008
5.2	U+ABC0..ABED, ABF0..ABF9	56	L2/08-221		Lata, Swaran (14 May 2008), 7 scanned pages of pre-1980 Meetei Mayek
5.2	U+ABC0..ABED, ABF0..ABF9	56	L2/08-242		Moore, Lisa (18 June 2008), Letter from Lisa Moore to M. Chandramani Singh, Gov't of Manipur
5.2	U+ABC0..ABED, ABF0..ABF9	56	L2/08-291		Singh, L. Mahabir (6 August 2008), Proceeding of Meeting of Meetei Mayek Expert Committee Held on 17-07-2008
5.2	U+ABC0..ABED, ABF0..ABF9	56	L2/08-317		Muller, Eric (11 August 2008), "3", South Asia Subcommittee Report
5.2	U+ABC0..ABED, ABF0..ABF9	56	L2/08-232R	N3473R	Proposed Encoding for Meetei Mayek Block, 12 August 2008
5.2	U+ABC0..ABED, ABF0..ABF9	56	L2/08-239R	N3478R	Proposed Encoding for Meetei Mayek Extended Block, 12 August 2008
5.2	U+ABC0..ABED, ABF0..ABF9	56	L2/08-318	N3453 (pdf, doc)	Umamaheswaran, V. S. (13 August 2008), "M52.6", Unconfirmed minutes of WG 2 meeting 52
5.2	U+ABC0..ABED, ABF0..ABF9	56	L2/08-253R2		Moore, Lisa (19 August 2008), "Meetei Mayek (B.15.2, E.3)", UTC #116 Minutes
5.2	U+ABC0..ABED, ABF0..ABF9	56	L2/08-340		Moore, Lisa (11 September 2008), Letter from Lisa Moore to L Mahabir Singh (Government of Manipur)
5.2	U+ABC0..ABED, ABF0..ABF9	56	L2/08-161R2		Moore, Lisa (5 November 2008), "Meetei Mayek", UTC #115 Minutes
5.2	U+ABC0..ABED, ABF0..ABF9	56	L2/08-412	N3553 (pdf, doc)	Umamaheswaran, V. S. (5 November 2008), "M53.02", Unconfirmed minutes of WG 2 meeting 53
5.2	U+ABC0..ABED, ABF0..ABF9	56	L2/09-234	N3603 (pdf, doc)	Umamaheswaran, V. S. (8 July 2009), "10.24", Unconfirmed minutes of WG 2 meeting 54
5.2	U+ABC0..ABED, ABF0..ABF9	56		N3703 (pdf, doc)	Umamaheswaran, V. S. (13 April 2010), "M55.23", Unconfirmed minutes of WG 2 meeting no. 55, Tokyo 2009-10-26/30
5.2	U+ABC0..ABED, ABF0..ABF9	56	L2/13-072		Jain, Manoj (25 April 2013), Letter from Rajendra Kumar to Mark Davis re Meetei Mayek encoding
5.2	U+ABC0..ABED, ABF0..ABF9	56	L2/13-073		Proceedings of the meeting of Language/Meetei Mayek Expert Committee held on 17/11/2012, 26 April 2013
5.2	U+ABC0..ABED, ABF0..ABF9	56	L2/13-078		Singh, H. Mathang (26 April 2013), Meetei Mayek in Unicode Standard (email)
5.2	U+ABC0..ABED, ABF0..ABF9	56	L2/13-162		Moore, Lisa (24 July 2013), Unicode Response on Meetei Mayek
