= Panam Ningthou =

Igniter of the first fire in Meitei mythology

- Igniter of the first fire and protector of crops from hailstorm and thunder
- Member of Umang Lais
- Major cult center: Andro, Imphal East, Manipur
- Abode: Andro, Imphal East
- Symbol: burning fire
- Texts: Poireiton Khunthok
- Gender: Male
- Region: Manipur
- Ethnic group: Meitei
- Festivals: Chakpa Haraoba (one of the four types of Lai Haraoba festival)

Equivalents
- Greek: Hephaestus, Prometheus
- Roman: Vulcan

Panam Ningthou (Meitei: ꯄꯅꯝ ꯅꯤꯡꯊꯧ) is a God in Sanamahism, the indigenous religion of Manipur. He is the protector of crops, especially rice, from hailstorms and thunder. According to legends, He ignited the first fire with flint. He is one of the Umang Lai deities.

== Description ==
Panam Ningthou is a rain and weather God of the Meitei people of Manipur. He has a wife called Leimaren Sanarik Chaning Khombi.

== Festival and worship ==
God Panam Ningthou is mainly worshipped by the people of Loi caste. His major cult center is the ancient village of Andro, Imphal East. where a sacred fire has been kept burning in the Chakpa Panam Ningthou Meihoupirol (sacred burning fireplace) since the time of Poireiton Khunthok c. 34 BC-18 BC. The sacred fore of Andro is the oldest man-made fire in India.

The Chakpa Haraoba, one of the four types of Lai Haraoba festival, is an annual celebration in honor of Panam Ningthou in the Meitei lunar month of Lamta (March–April). The festival starts from the first Sunday of the month of Lamta month.

Two days before the Lai Haraoba festival begins, Panam Ningthou is said to come to in the form of a ball of light. He came flying from the east. Sometimes, the people of Andro claimed to see that ball of light, even at other times of the year. During the nine day long festival, no outsiders are allowed to stay at the village. In modern times, notice is issued one month before the festival begins through mass media like television, newspaper and radio, requesting that outsiders leave for the duration of festival. Natives of Andro may return to Andro before the festival starts. Once the festival begins, no one is allowed enter or leave the village. Converts to religions other than Sanamahism are not allowed to participate in the religious festival, even if they are native of Andro. During the festival, people wear black clothes Andro also has twelve other deities, and their festivals are open to outsiders.

The Loi people regarded Panam Ningthou as a protector of the Meitei king, who himself provided sacrificial animals, including buffalo, for the God. Outside of the Lai Haraoba festival, pigs were sacrificed, and whenever there was any suspicion of danger to the Meitei king, he would send a pig and a cock to Andro to be sacrificed.

== Association with other gods ==
According to the Thalon text, Panam Ningthou was one of the five gods of five different places in the Nongmaiching Hills. The cults of these five gods were combined into that of a single God, Langmai Ningthou (lit. King of the Langmais). The personal names of the original five became the names of various forms of the God. With this, the tribal society of the Selloi Langmai people became one chiefdom, later known as the Angom.

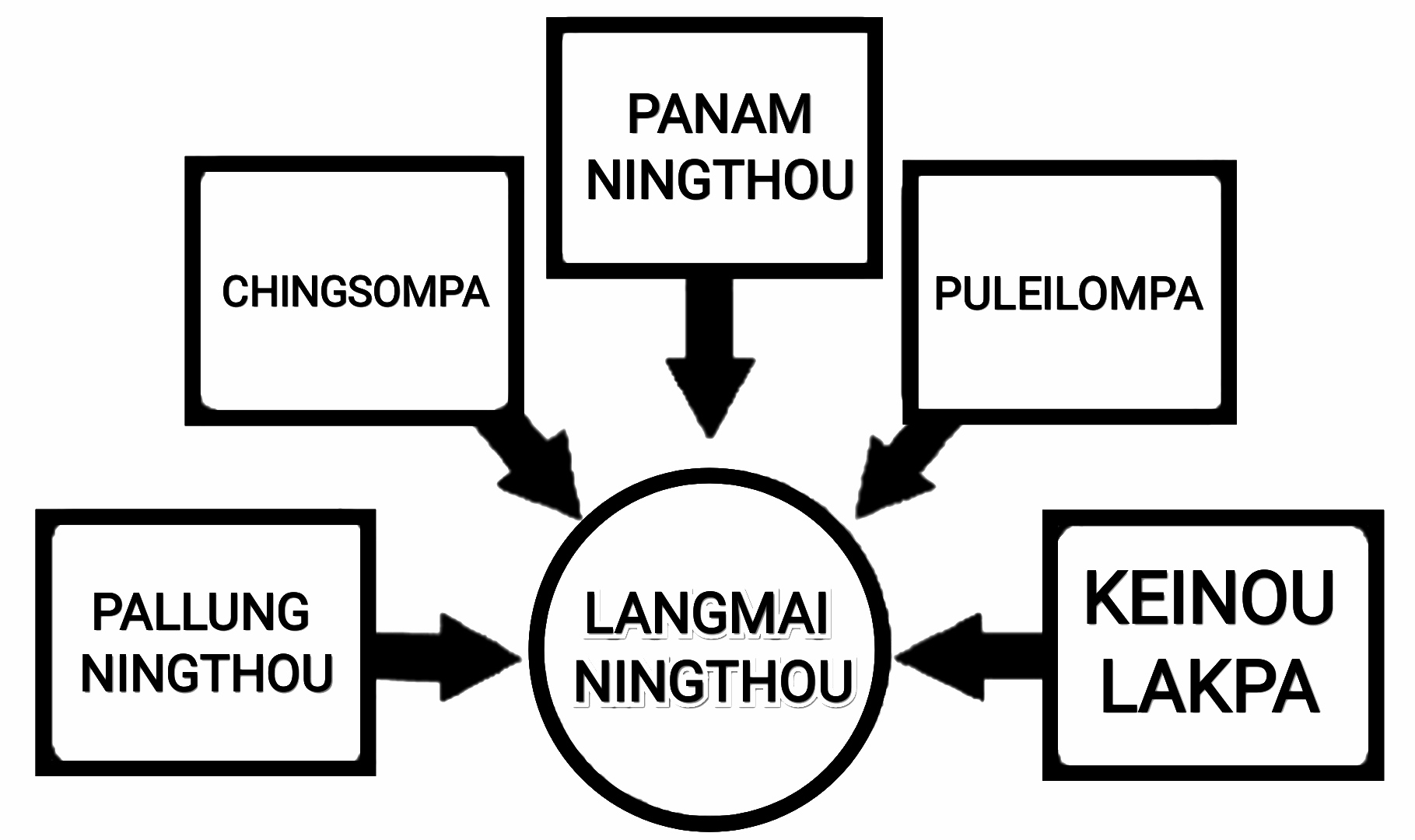
Panam Ningthou was one of the 5 gods worshipped in the 5 divisions of the Selloi Langmai hills that gradually merged into one God with the name "Langmai Ningthou" (lit. King of the Langmais).

== Namesake ==
=== Panam Ningthou Semba ===
There is a real servant class named Panam Ningthou Semba. It takes care of polo equipment for Meitei royalty.

== Gallery ==
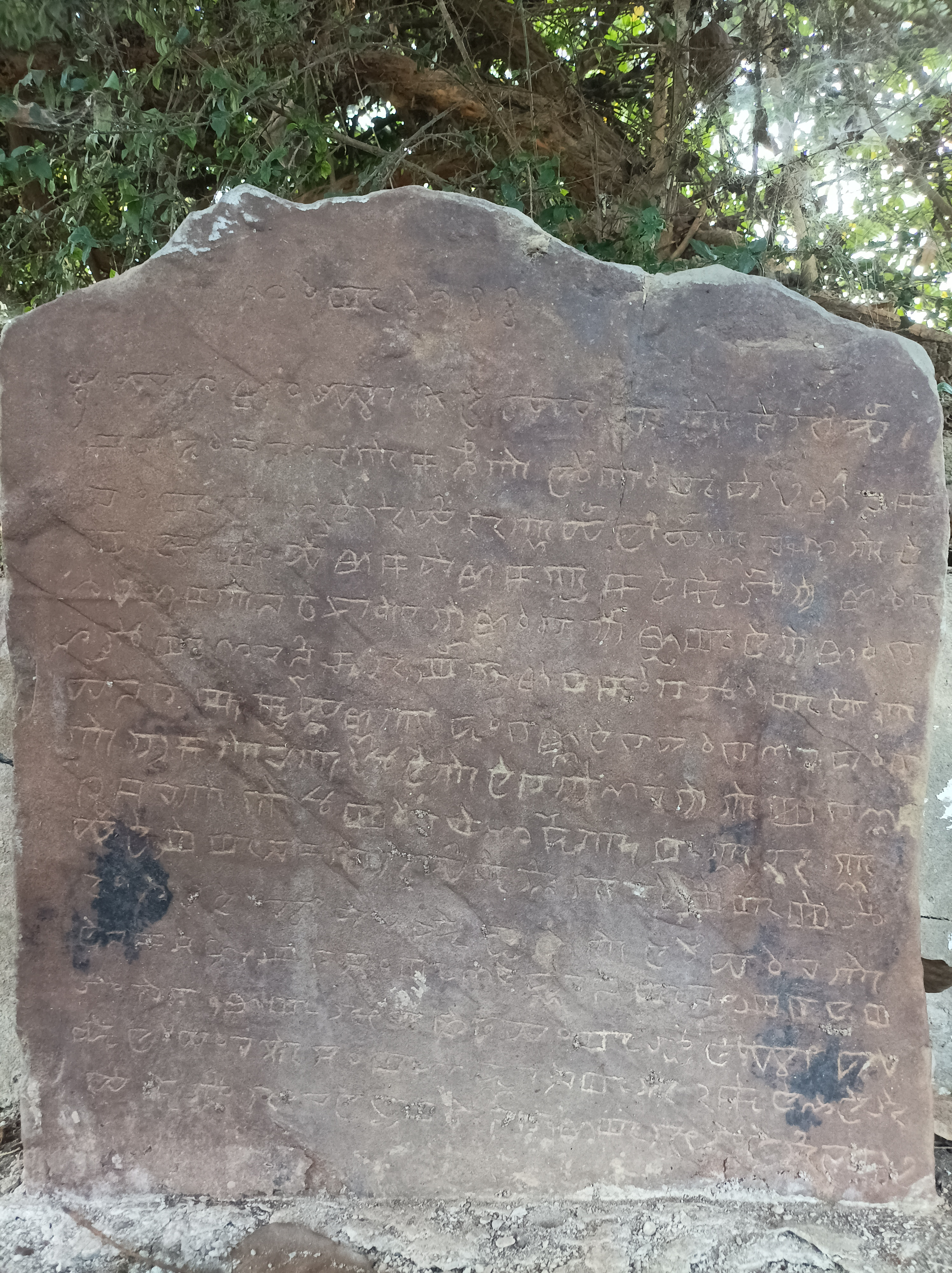
Meitei Stone inscription inside the Panam Ningthou Sacred Site about a royal decree

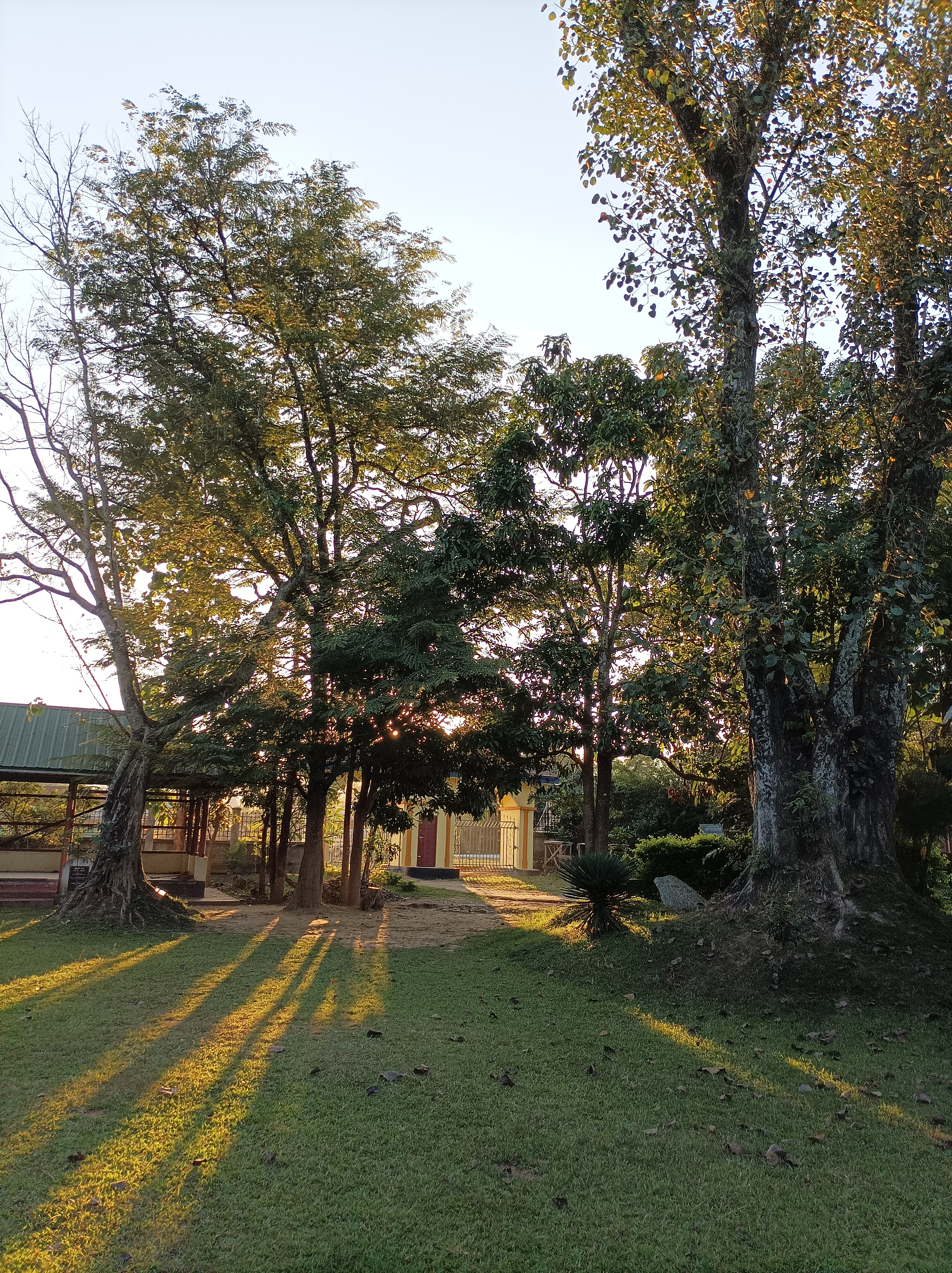
A Sacred Grove in the Panam Ningthou Sacred Site

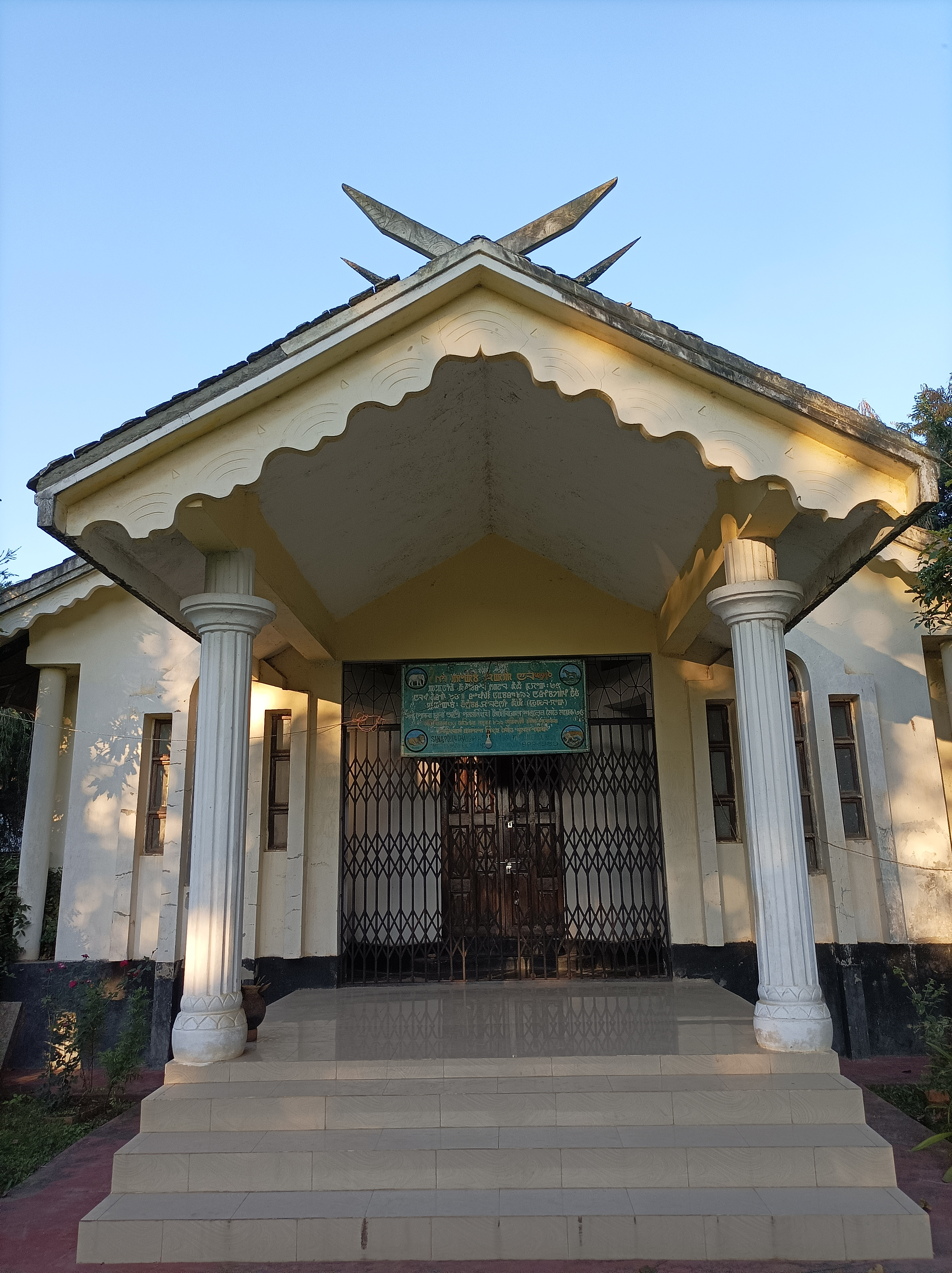
A temple (rebuilt) inside the Panam Ningthou Sacred Site

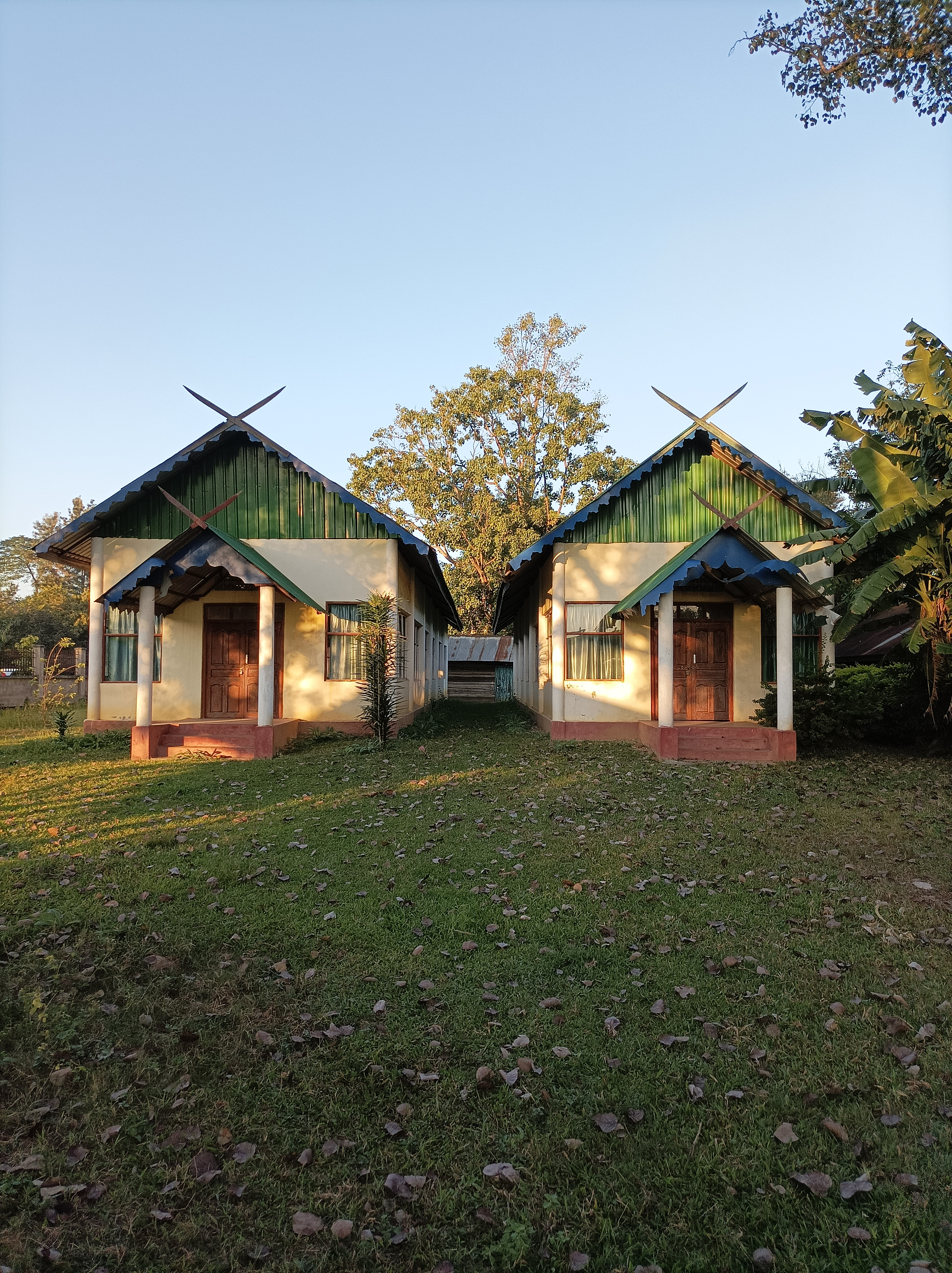
Two official buildings (rebuilt) in the Panam Ningthou Sacred Site

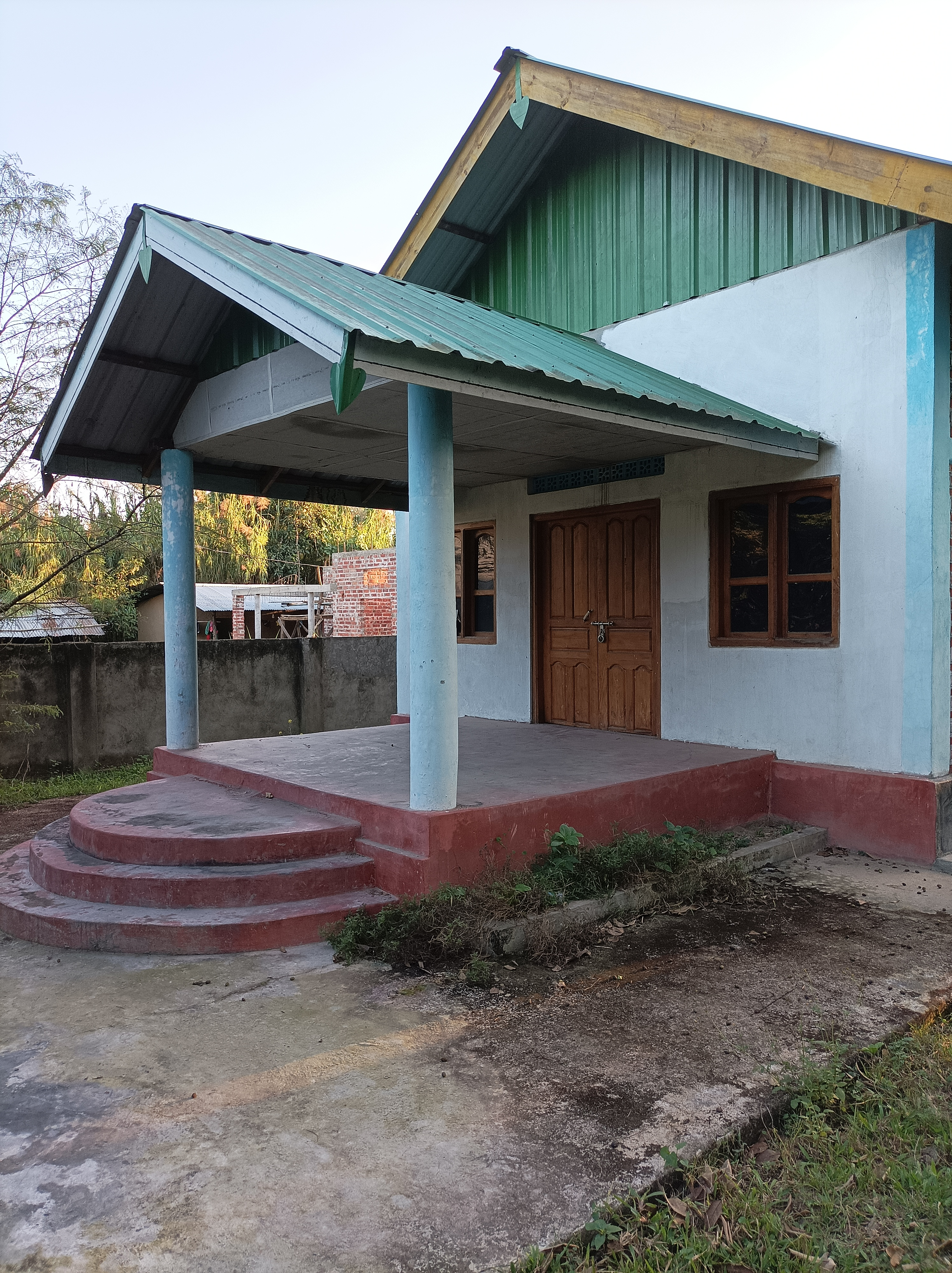
A Mini Museum in the Panam Ningthou Sacred Site
