= Meitei people in Assam =

Assam Meiteis (Meitei people in Assam)
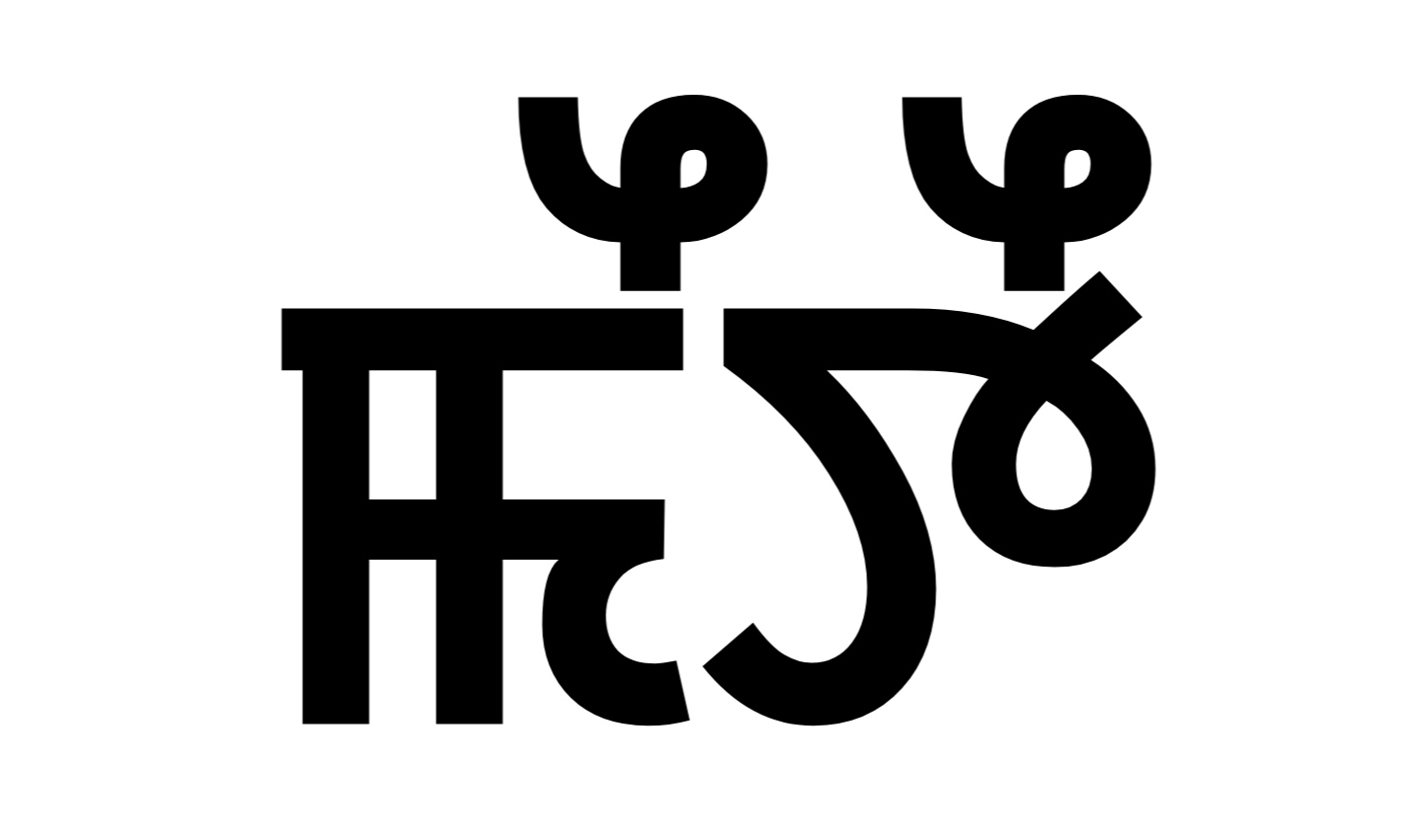

- Cultural flag of the Meiteis

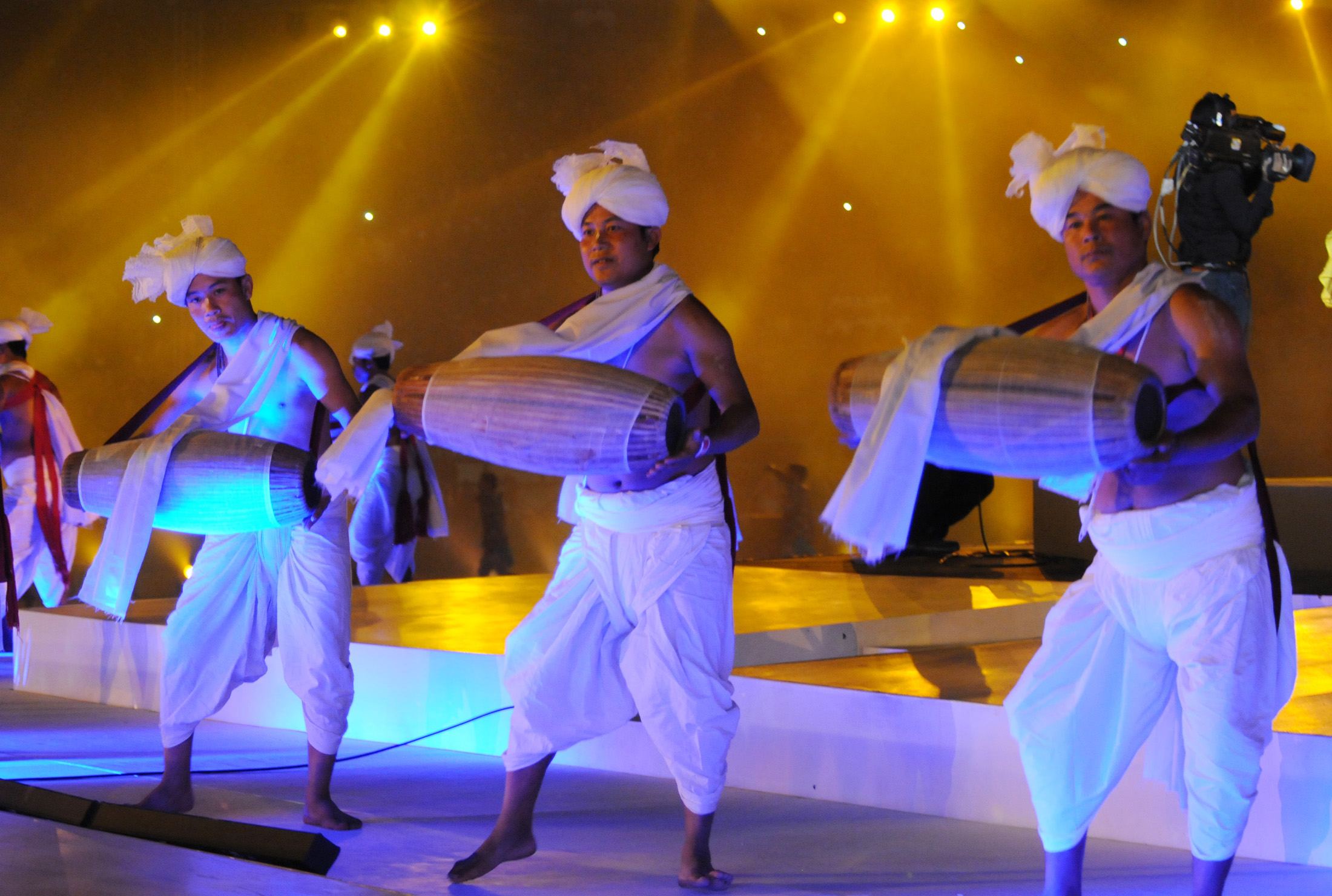
- Traditional Meitei dance, Pung Cholom performance in Guwahati, Assam

Total population
- 168,127 (2020)

Languages
- Meitei language (officially known as Manipuri language)

Religion
- Majority: Hinduism; Minority: Sanamahism, Islam

Related ethnic groups
- other Indian people

The Meitei people, also called Manipuri people, is one of the minority ethnic groups in Assam. They are referred to as Mekhlee, Mekhelee, Meckley, Monipuri, Monipuriya, Magalu, Mogolu, Moglie, Moglai, among many other names dedicated to them by the other people of Assam. Meiteis call Assam as "Tekhao" or "Tekhau" or "Tekhaw". In October 2020 their population was estimated to be 168,127. The Meitei tribe is a fairly large ethnic minority in Assam and Meitei culture can be found in many places.

== History ==
In the 16th century, the kings of Tekhao (Meitei language term for Assam) and Manipur had friendly relations. This friendship grew stronger after a route to Assam opened in 1536–37, leading to more social and cultural exchanges, as well as people moving between the regions. Meitei people started settling in Assam after a royal marriage in 1537.

When Burmese King Bayinnaung of the Toungo dynasty captured Manipur kingdom during the reign of Meitei King Mungyamba (Meitei: ꯅꯤꯡꯊꯧ ꯃꯨꯡꯌꯥꯝꯕ, 1562–1597), many people left Manipur. This movement continued until September 18, 1891. The emigrants from Manipur had to choose one of the routes through the hills, either Tongjei Maril (Meitei: ꯇꯣꯡꯖꯩ ꯃꯔꯤꯜ) or Akhui routes. The lower plains of the Surma Valley (also known as Barak Valley) were good places for the Meitei people to settle because of their favorable geography, politics, and economy.

In Assam's history, a Meitei princess named Kuranganayani (Meitei: ꯂꯩꯃ ꯀꯨꯔꯪꯒꯅꯌꯅꯤ), the queen of Assamese King Swargadeo Rajeshwor Singh, became a heroine when she killed a rebel named Raghav Moran with a sword in 1769. Historian S.K. Bhuyan says she is honored among Assam's heroic women. Another royal marriage happened after the death of Swargadeo Rajeshwor Singh, when his brother Swargadeo Lakshmi Singh married a Meitei princess. These events led to more Meitei people settling in Tekhao (Assam).

One reason for the Meitei settlement in the Barak Valley is a conflict in 1604 between King Khagemba (Meitei: ꯅꯤꯡꯊꯧ ꯈꯥꯒꯦꯝꯕ) and his youngest brother Sanongba (Meitei: ꯁꯥꯅꯣꯡꯕ) over a minor issue involving a broken boat. Khagemba fled to Cachar with two generals, Yakharek (Meitei: ꯌꯥꯈꯥꯔꯦꯛ) and Bhimbol (Meitei: ꯚꯤꯝꯕꯣꯜ). This event led to the Meiteis settling in Cachar, also known as the Barak Valley. Another reason is a matrimonial alliance recorded in 1720. Raja Ram Chandra Narayan, the ruler of Cachar, married Rani Projabati Devi (Meitei: ꯔꯥꯅꯤ ꯄ꯭ꯔꯣꯖꯥꯕꯇꯤ ꯗꯦꯕꯤ), a Meitei princess. During Ram Chandra's reign, the capital of Cachar was Khaspur. The Meitei attendants of Princess Meitei Chanu Projabati Devi began to settle permanently in Cachar.

During the rule of Meitei King Chitsai (Meitei: ꯅꯤꯡꯊꯧ ꯆꯤꯠꯁꯥꯏ), some Meitei people had to move to Cachar because of political exile. King Chitsai and his followers were forced to live in Cachar from 1752, after the assassination of Meitei King Pamheiba (Meitei: ꯅꯤꯡꯊꯧ ꯄꯥꯝꯍꯩꯕ), also known as Garibnawaz. Meitei King Bheigyachandra (Meitei: ꯅꯤꯡꯊꯧ ꯚꯩꯒ꯭ꯌꯆꯟꯗ꯭ꯔ, 1759–1758) lost and regained his power four times. After each Burmese invasion, he had to flee with his followers. Because of his frequent need for political asylum, the emigrants formed a network.

Meitei King Modhuchandra (Meitei: ꯅꯤꯡꯊꯧ ꯃꯣꯙꯨꯆꯟꯗ꯭ꯔ) ruled from 1800 to 1803. In 1803, his brother Chourjit Singh (Meitei: ꯅꯤꯡꯊꯧ ꯆꯧꯔꯖꯤꯠ) overthrew him. Modhuchandra then sought refuge in Cachar with his family and followers. In 1806, he arranged for his daughter to marry King Krishnachandra (Meitei: ꯅꯤꯡꯊꯧ ꯀ꯭ꯔꯤꯁ꯭ꯅꯆꯟꯗ꯭ꯔ) of Cachar.

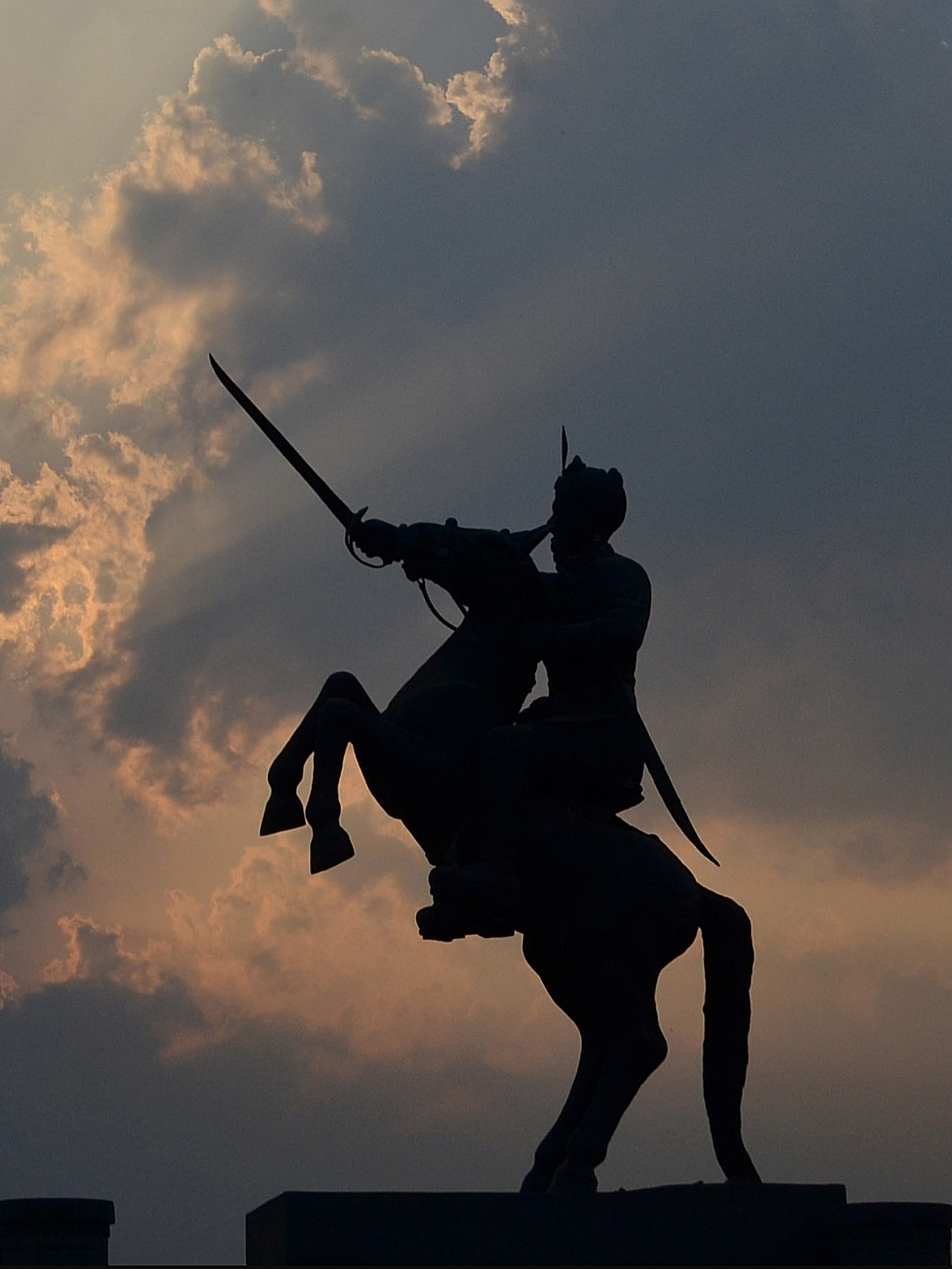
Manipur Levy was established in Assam by the Meiteis to attack and win back the then Burmese occupied Manipur

== Language and scripts ==
Meitei language (Meitei: ꯃꯩꯇꯩꯂꯣꯟ), also known as Manipuri language (Meitei: ꯃꯅꯤꯄꯨꯔꯤ ꯂꯣꯟ), is one of the official languages of the state government of Assam. It serves as the additional official language in all the three districts of the Barak Valley (Cachar district, Hailakandi district and Karimganj district) as well as in the Hojai district of the Brahmaputra Valley of Assam.

In 2024, the State Cabinet of the Government of Assam approved the Meitei script to be used in the education of Meitei language across all the academic institutions of Assam, to help the students interested in the Meitei literature (also known as Manipuri literature) to know better about the subject.

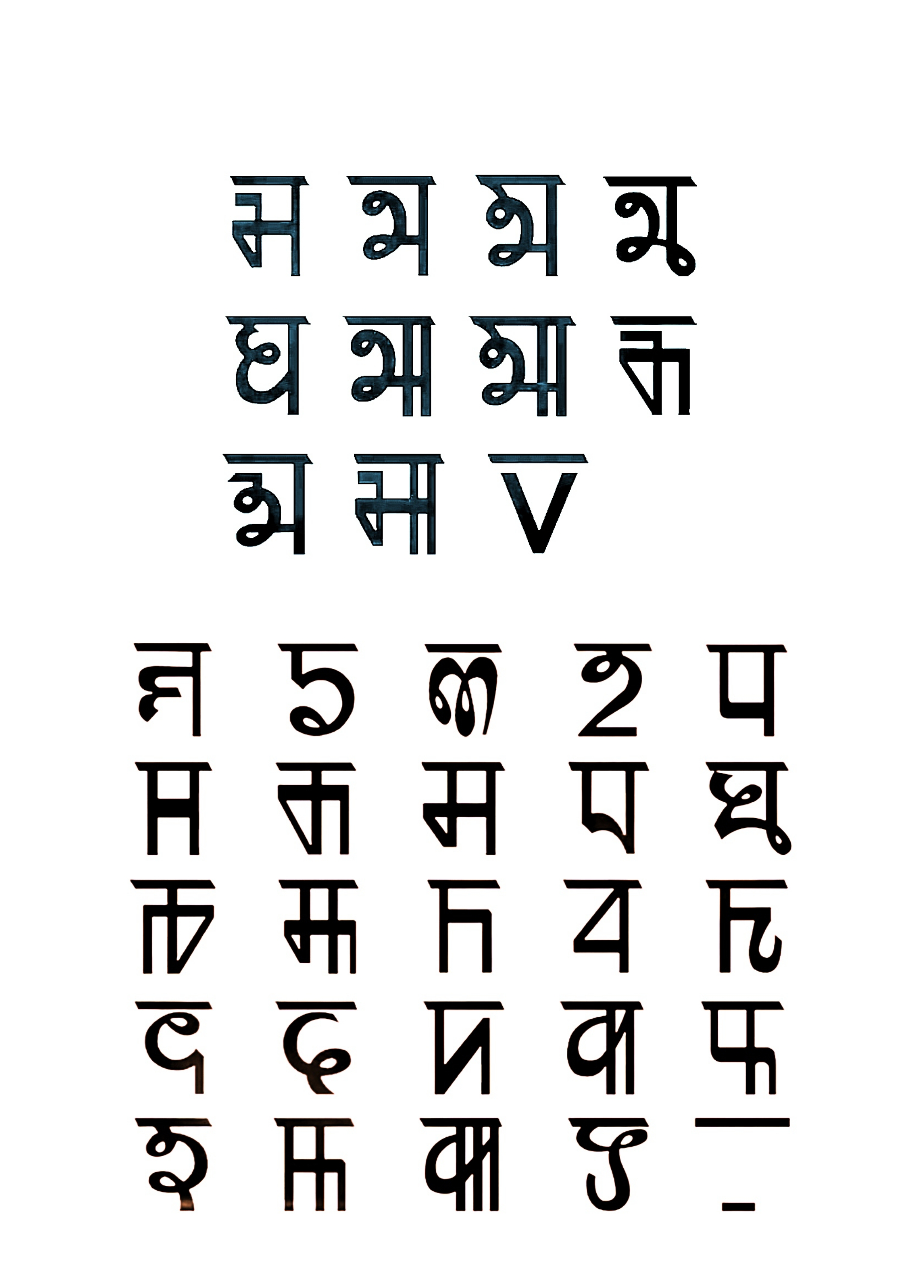
The vowel and consonant letters of the Naoriya Phulo script (invented Meetei Yelhou Mayek), a constructed script developed by Naoriya Phulo for writing Meitei language

A unique form of writing system called "Meetei Yelhou Mayek" (Meitei: ꯃꯤꯇꯩ ꯌꯦꯜꯍꯧ ꯃꯌꯦꯛ), better known as Naoriya Phulo script, totally different from the general Meitei script, was developed by Naoriya Phulo (Meitei: ꯅꯥꯎꯔꯤꯌꯥ ꯐꯨꯂꯣ) in Cachar, Assam, to write Meitei language in particular cases.

== Culture ==
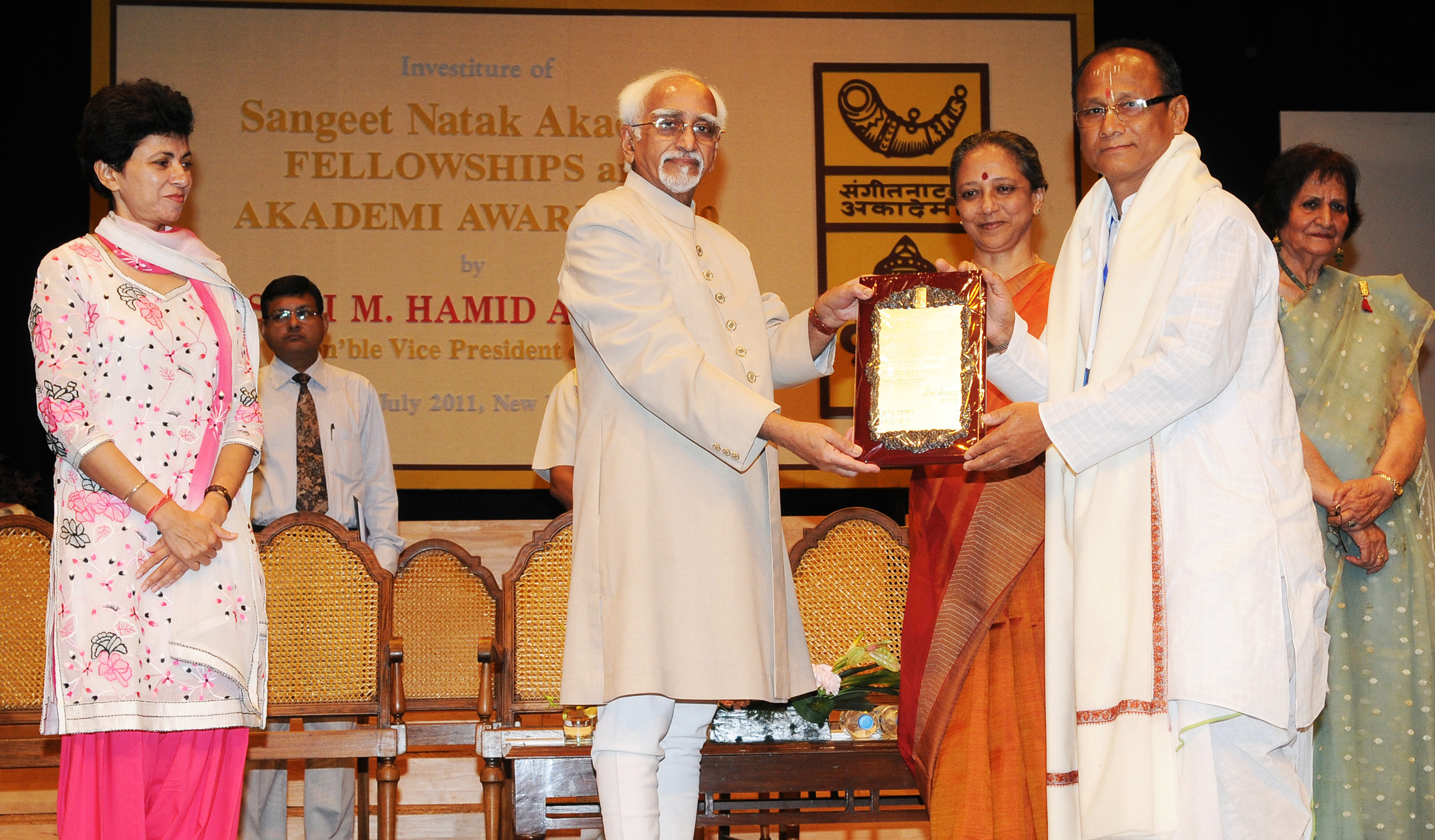
Phanjoubam Iboton Singh receiving the prestigious Sangeet Natak Akademi Award-2010 from Mohammad Hamid Ansari.

=== Agriculture ===
There is a Meitei agricultural institution named Loungak Marup (Meitei: ꯂꯧꯉꯥꯛ ꯃꯔꯨꯞ), having the primary aim to save agricultural lands and depreciate selling of land to other people.

=== Religion ===
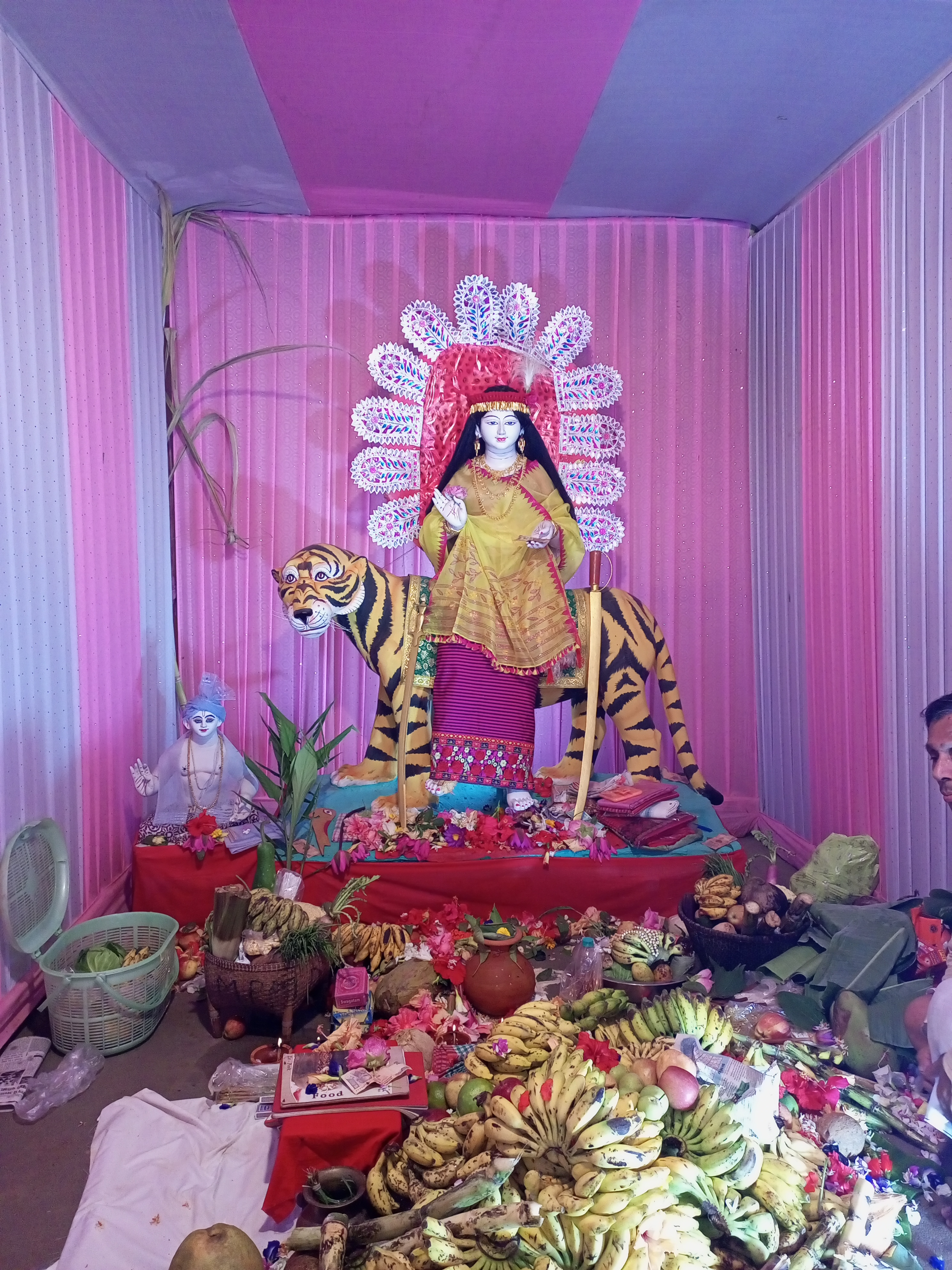
Panthoibi Iratpa festival dedicated to goddess Panthoibi celebrated in Hojai, Assam

Lai Haraoba (Meitei: ꯂꯥꯏ ꯍꯔꯥꯎꯕ) dedicated to the Umang Lai (Meitei: ꯎꯃꯪ ꯂꯥꯏ) deities is common among the Assam Meiteis. Goddess Panthoibi (Meitei: ꯄꯥꯟꯊꯣꯏꯕꯤ) is also commonly worshipped by them.

A modern Meitei social and religious institution named Apokpa Marup was founded by Laininghal Naoriya Phulo in Cachar.

== Groups ==
=== Development council ===
Inspired by the development of the autonomous councils for Karbi people and Bodo people, the Meiteis living in Hojai developed the "Manipuri Development Council" with the approval of the Government of Assam, after two rounds of protests against the government in front of Assam State Assembly. During the 2012 financial year, the Government of Assam gave Rs 1.50 lakh to the Manipuri Development Council. For the 2013 financial year, they gave Rs 2.30 crores for the same. The development council is run as an Ad hoc committee. Many Meitei candidates were elected in Panchayat elections.

=== Others ===
The following groups took active role in the historic Meitei associate official language movement:

- All Manipur Students' Union (AMSU)
- Assam Manipuri Meira Paibi Lup
- Assam Manipuri Sahitya Parishad
- All Assam Manipuri Muslim Youth Front
- All Assam Manipuri Students Union (AAMSU)
- Guwahati Manipuri Coordination Committee (GMCC)
- Manipuri Youth Front of Assam (MYFA)
- Union of Association of Manipuri Writers
- Youth's Action Committee for Protection of Indigenous People (YACPIP)

== See also ==
- Meitei people in Bangladesh
- Meitei people in Myanmar

== Bibliography ==
- Historical and Cultural Relations Between Manipur, Assam, and Bengal. India: Manipuri Sahitya Parishad, 1986.
- Vaghaiwalla, R. B.. Assam, Manipur and Tripura. India: India Office House, 1953.
- Encyclopaedia of Indian Tribes: Assam & Manipur. India: Anmol Publications, 1994.
- Tribes of Assam and Manipur. India: Anmol Publ., 1997.
- Kshetri, Rajendra. The Emergence of Meetei Nationalism: A Study of Two Movements Among the Meeteis. India: Mittal Publications, 2006.
