= Mayek =

Mayek may refer to:

- Meitei script
- Bengali–Assamese script
- Bengali alphabet
- Naoriya Phulo script
