= Naorem =

Naorem is a Meetei surname. It is native to Ancient Kangleipak (Antique Manipur). People of this family mainly inhabit in Manipur, India.

== History ==
During the era of King Samuroiba Ningthou, the Naorem clan built a temple dedicated to God Khamlangba at Kakching Wairi. The holy shrine was looked after by the Naorem family.

== Notable persons ==
- Laininghal Naoriya Phulo (alias Naorem Phulo) - Cultural revivalist and philosopher
