= Khamlangba =

Meitei God of iron ore mining and steel manufacturing

- God of iron, mining, metallurgy, steel manufacturing, hunting and war
- Member of Lainingthous and Lam Lais
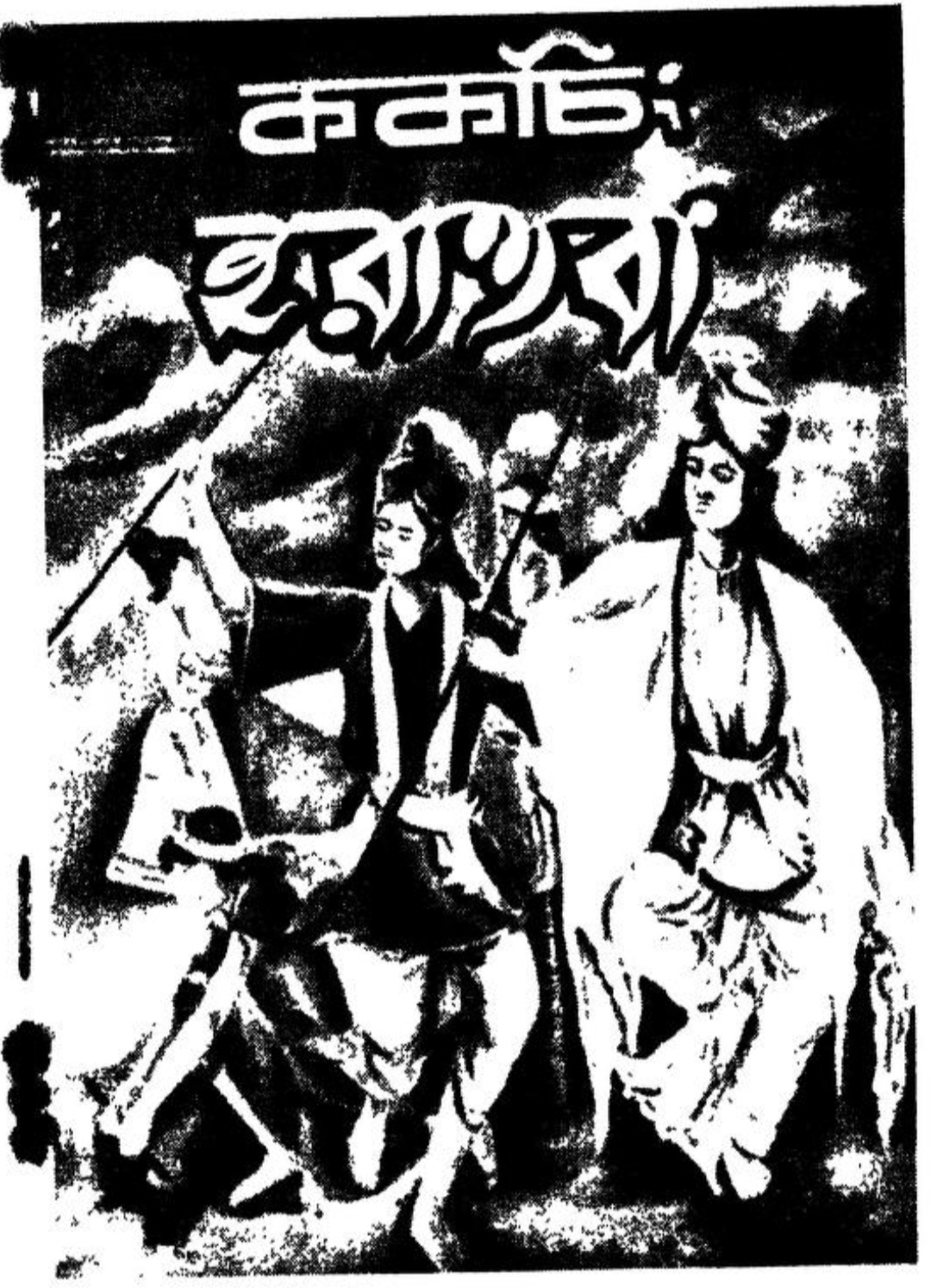
- Khamlangba is mainly worshipped in Kakching Haraoba, one of the major forms of Lai Haraoba
- Other names: Lai Khamlangpa, Lainingthou Khamlangpa
- Affiliation: Sanamahism
- Major cult center: Kakching
- Abode: Kakching
- Artifacts: Iron ores and steel
- Adherents: Meitei people
- Texts: Khamlangba Khunggumlon; Khamlangba Thenlon; Kangjeirol
- Gender: Male
- Region: Manipur
- Ethnic group: Meitei
- Festivals: Kakching Haraoba (Lai Haraoba)

Genealogy
- Parents: Atingkok (father)
- Consort: Huimu Leima
- Offspring: Amudon

Equivalents
- Greek: Hephaestus
- Hindu: Vishwakarma
- Roman: Vulcan

Khamlangba (Meitei: ꯈꯝꯂꯥꯡꯕ) is a deity in Sanamahism, the indigenous religion of Manipur. He is the God of iron, mining, metallurgy, steel manufacturing, hunting and war. His occupation is the extraction of the iron ores and the manufacture of steel. The Khamlangba Thenlon text mentions about his skills of iron metallurgy and blacksmith in ancient Kakching kingdom.

== Description ==
God Khamlangba is the miner of iron ores and the manufacturer of steel. He is worshipped for peace and prosperity in the kingdom. He is revered for protecting people from diseases and death. He drives away the evil spirits from the state. He belongs to the class of Sylvan Gods (Umang Lais).

The Kangjeirol text says that God Khamlangba was one of the divine polo players who played the divine polo match of the gods.

== Mythology ==
In the creation myth, God Khamlangba was grown out of Atiya Sidaba. He was a great hunter, warrior and miner. He lived with Goddess Huimu Leima and a son named Amudon was born to them. After this, Khamlangba left Ancient Kangleipak (Antique Manipur) for Tripura (Meitei: Takhel) in search of iron ores. When he returned to Ancient Kangleipak (Antique Manipur), he settled in Kakching. The people of Kakching worshipped Him. Later, "Kakching Haraoba", a new form of Lai Haraoba was developed. This account is evident in the Khamlangba Khunggumlon text.

In another legend, God Khamlangba stayed for some time at a place named Khuman Heiyel Loubuk. Later, he came to Kheraching. Nganba Tekcha Pamba Laihat Thouba beheaded Irum Lai Tubi Kokling Lengba. So, the place where God Khamlangba stayed was later known as Kakching Khullen and Kakching Wairi.

God Khamlangba participated in the divine polo match played among the gods. The divine polo match took place during the reign of the deified Meetei King Nongda Lairen Pakhangba as described in the Kangjeirol text. He was one of the seven polo players in the team led by Marjing. His opponents were led by Thangjing.

== Cults and shrines ==
God Khamlangba holds a special position for the Kakching Haraoba. Kakching Haraoba is one of the four types of Lai Haraoba festival.

During the era of King Samuroiba Ningthou, the temple of Khamlangba was built in Kakching Khullen. The Naorem family also built a temple of Khamlangba at Kakching Wairi. The temple of Khamlangba in Kakching Khullen was maintained by the Mayanglambam clan while the one at Kakching Wairi was maintained by Naorem family.

== Gallery ==
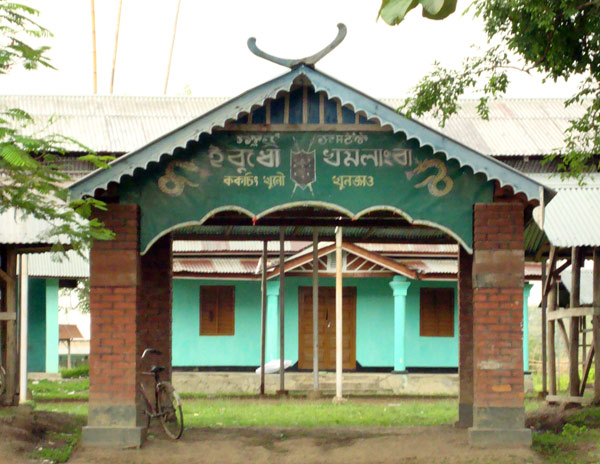
A shrine dedicated to Khamlangba

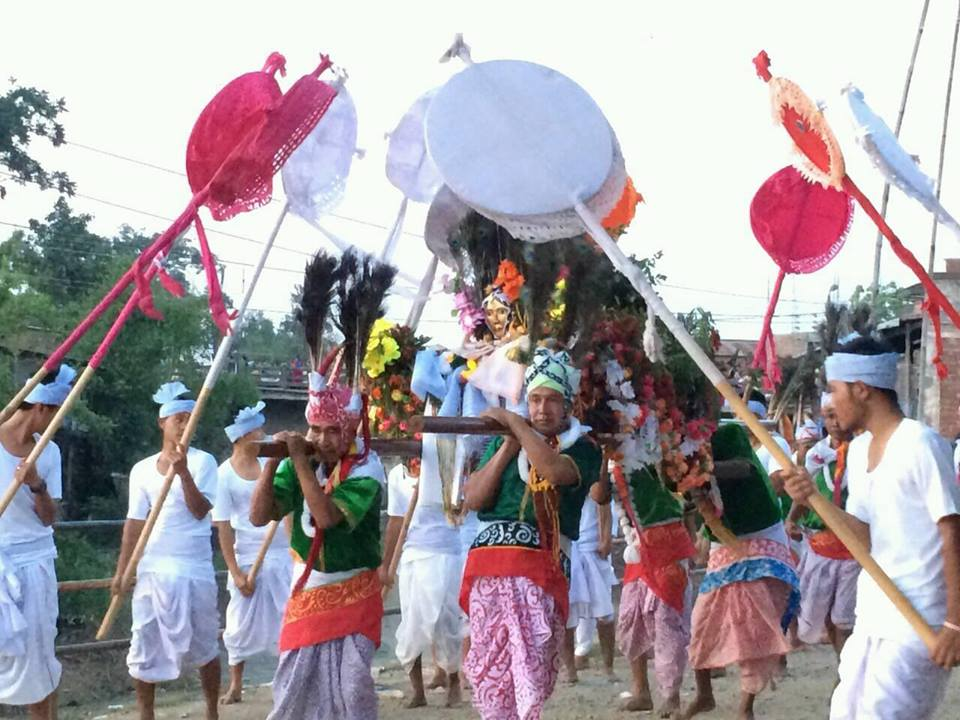
A religious festival dedicated to Khamlangba

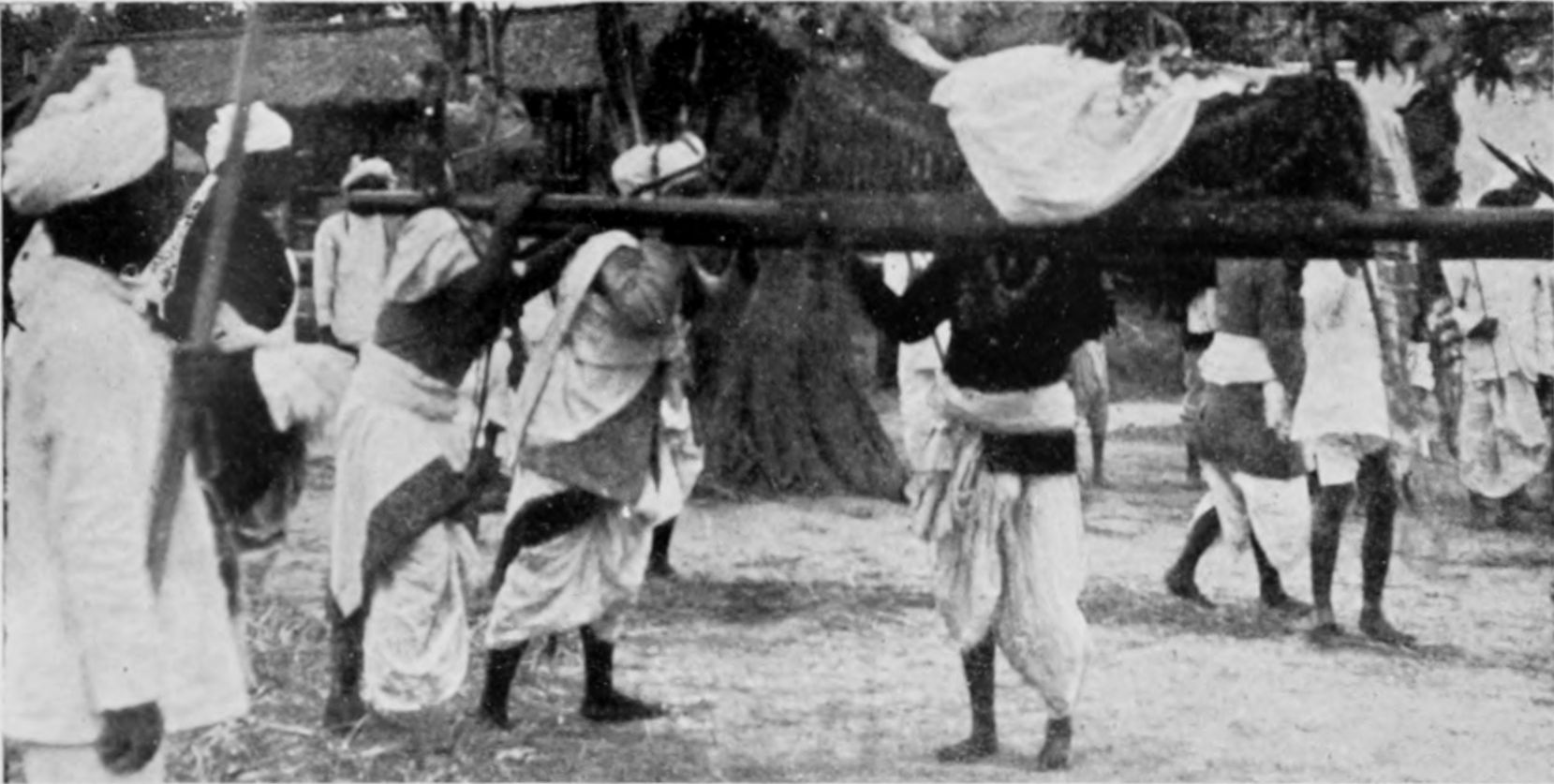
Litter with the emblem of Khamlangba

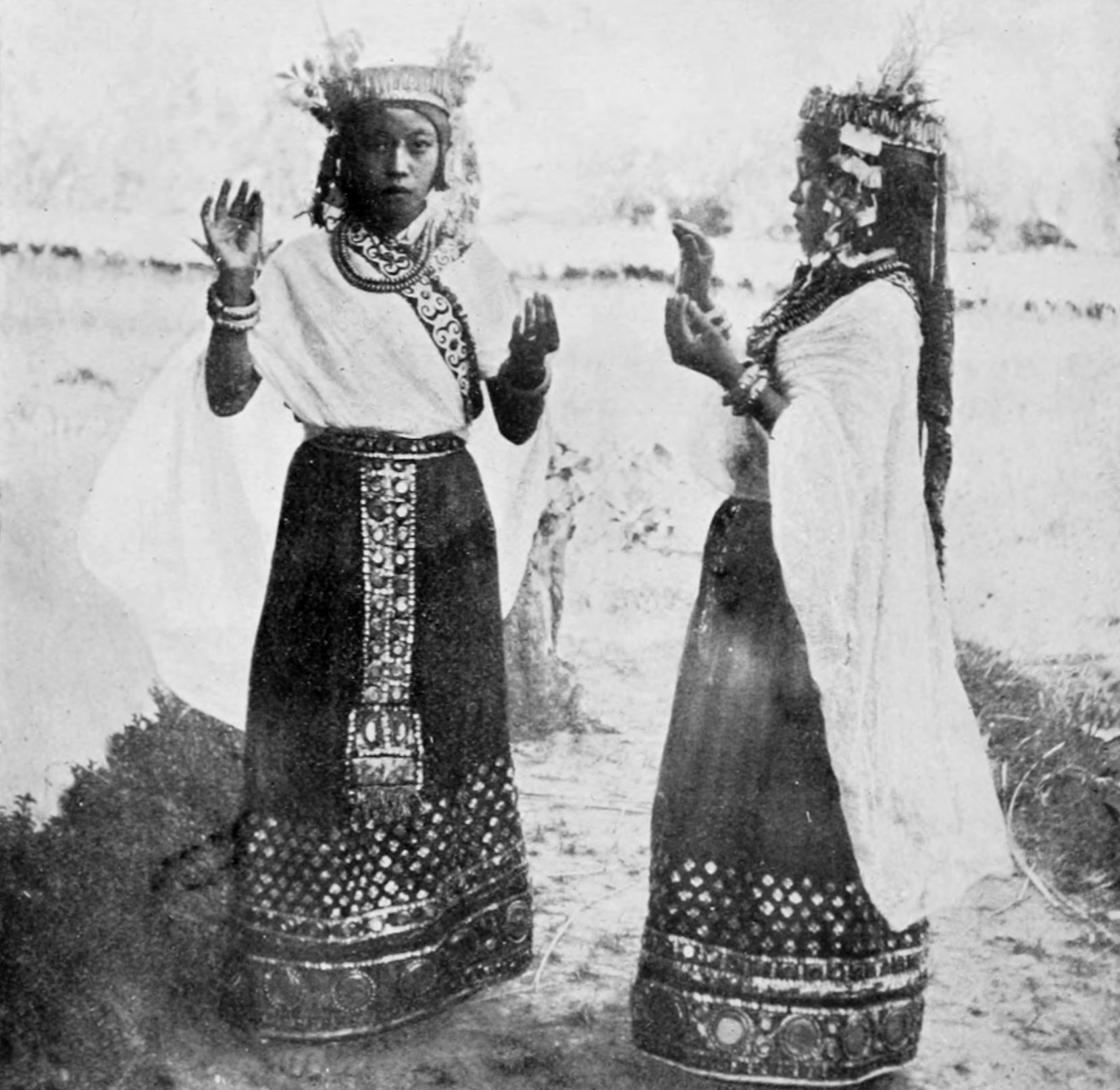
Maiden dancers at the religious festival of Lai Haraoba dedicated to Khamlangba

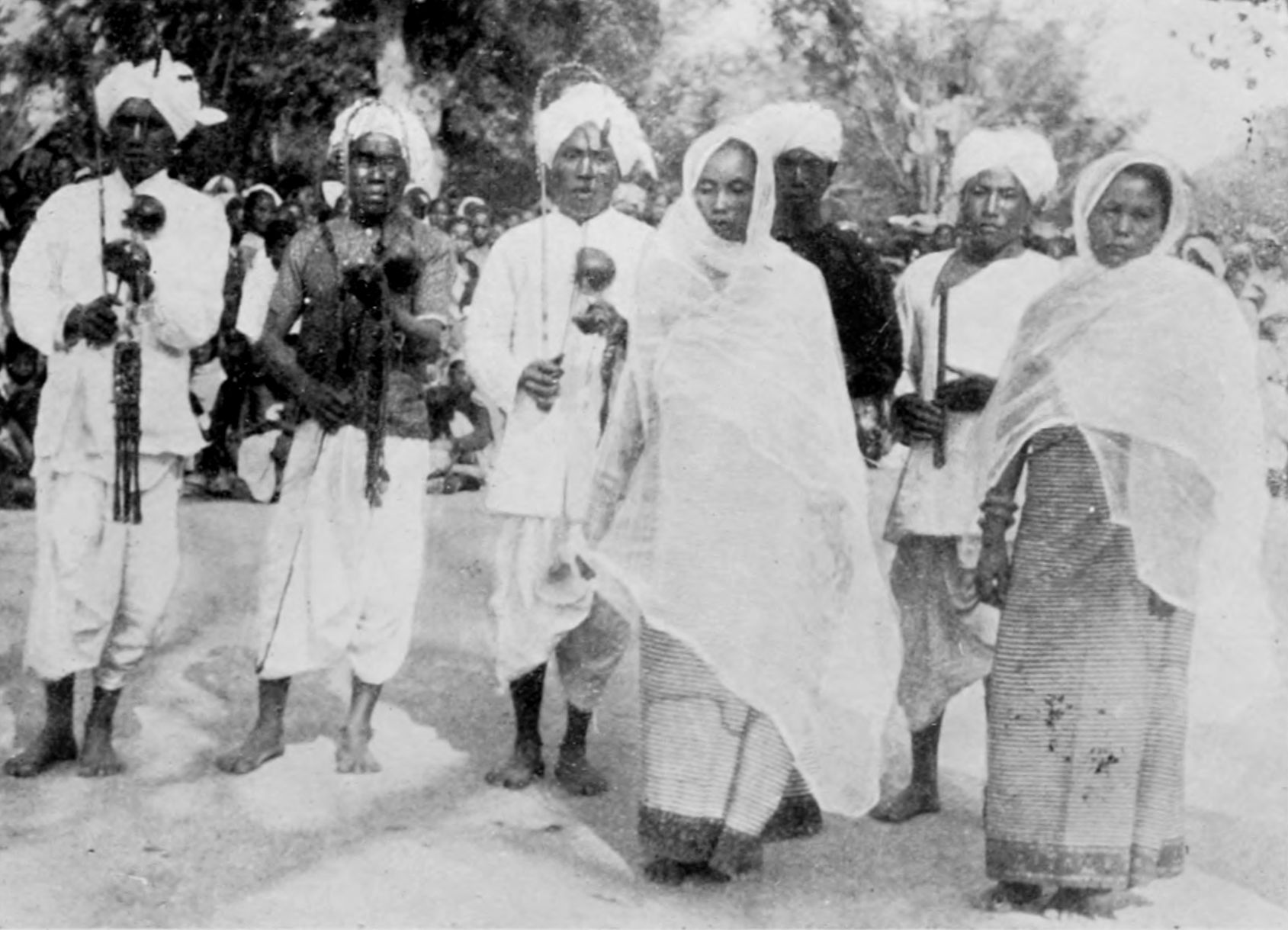
Khamlangba's orchestras (with penas) and the married dancers
