= Naoriya Phulo script =

Constructed script for writing the Meitei language

Naoriya Phulo script (Meitei: Naoriya Phulo Mayek) (Note: The term "Phulo" is also spelled as "Phullo" with an additional letter "L". But "Phulo" is the correct spelling as it means "flower", derived from the Indo Aryan term "Phul", which has single "L".)
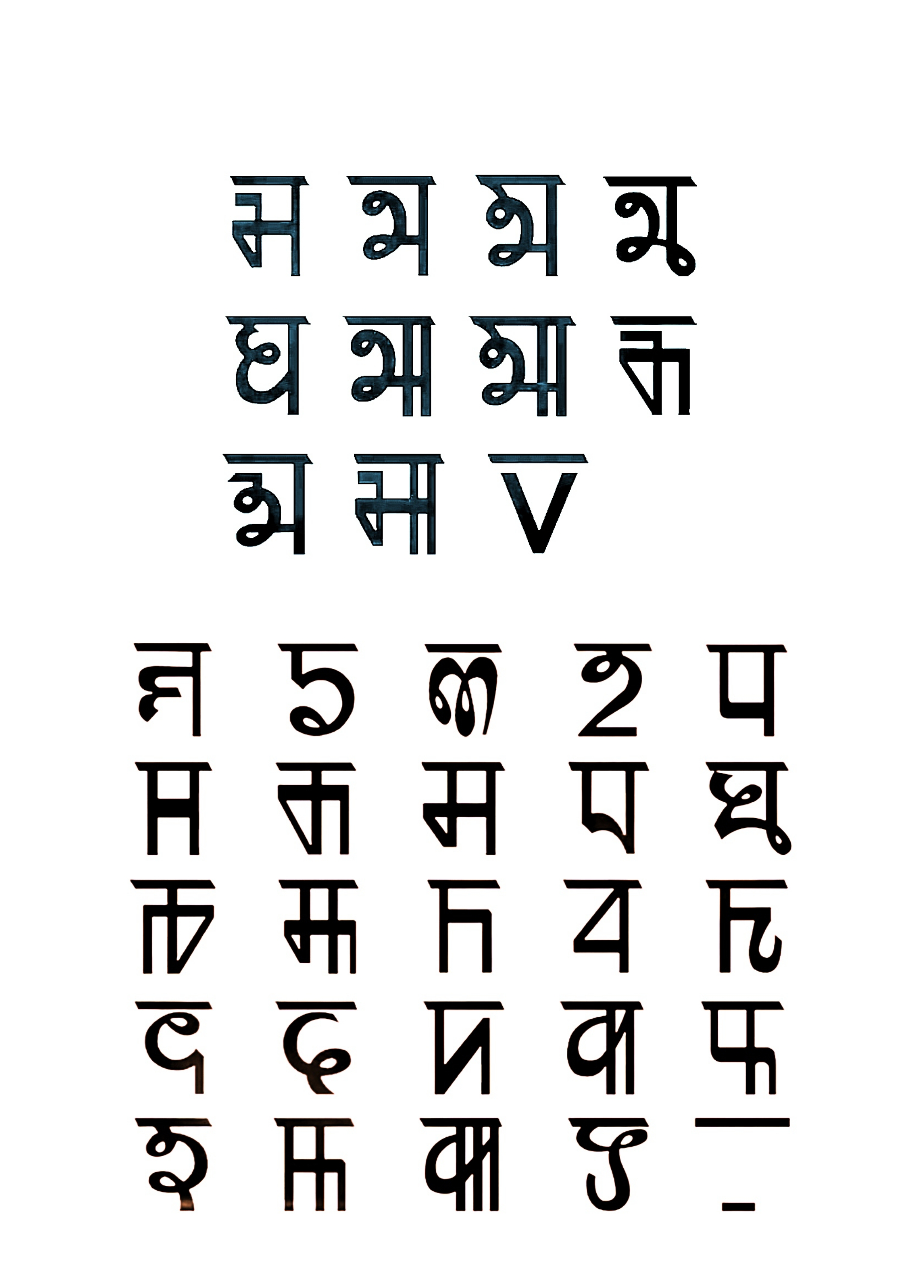
- The vowel and consonant letters of the Naoriya Phulo script (invented Meetei Yelhou Mayek)
- Script type: abugida
- Period: 20th century AD – present
- Official script: no
- Languages: Meitei language (officially termed as Manipuri)

Related scripts
- Sister systems: Meitei Mayek (traditional Meitei script), Devanagari script and the Eastern Nagari script (Bengali-Assamese script)
- It is a constructed script developed by Laininghal Naoriya Phulo (1888-1941).

The Naoriya Phulo script (Meitei: Naoriya Phulo Mayek), also known as the Naoria script (Meitei: Naoria Mayek), (Note: The term "Naoriya" is also spelled as "Naoria" removing the letter "y".) the Invented Meitei Yelhou Mayek script, or the Invented Meetei Yelhou Mayek script, (Note: The terms "Meitei Yelhou Mayek script" or "Meetei Yelhou Mayek script" are sometimes also used to refer to the general Meitei Mayek script. So, the term "Invented" is prefixed to refer to the Naoriya Phulo script.) is a constructed script, invented by Laininghal Naoriya Phulo (1888-1941), to write Meitei language (officially called Manipuri language). It is different from the Meitei Mayek, the official script for Meitei language. It shares many similarities with the Devanagari script and the Eastern Nagari script (Bengali-Assamese script).

== History ==
The invented script of Naoriya Phulo of Cachar was sometimes interpreted as a divine gift. According to a legend, it was presented to him in his trance along with a text named the "Shakok Salai Thiren" (written in this script). During the 1930s, using his own invented script, Naoriya Phulo challenged the then official script for Meitei language. Naoriya Phulo and his organization named "Apokpa Marup" used to claim the newly invented script as the original old script for Meitei language. However, the claim was later discarded. In the year 1973, they demanded their invented script to be adopted as the "Meitei script".

== Comparison to other scripts ==
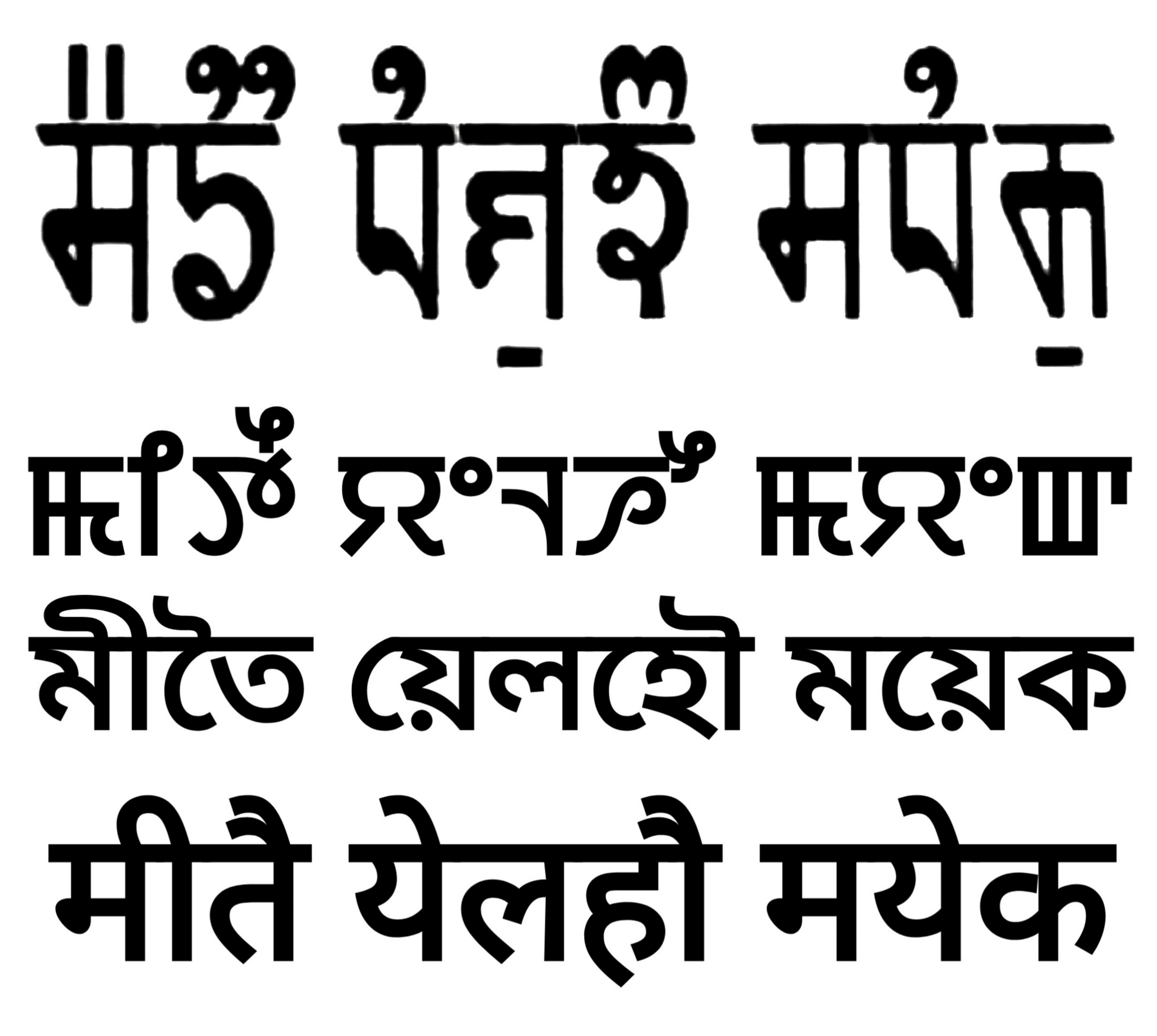
Transliterations of the term "Meetei Yelhou Mayek" in Naoriya Phulo script (invented Meetei Yelhou Mayek), traditional Meitei Mayek script, Bengali script (Eastern Nagari script), and Devanagari.

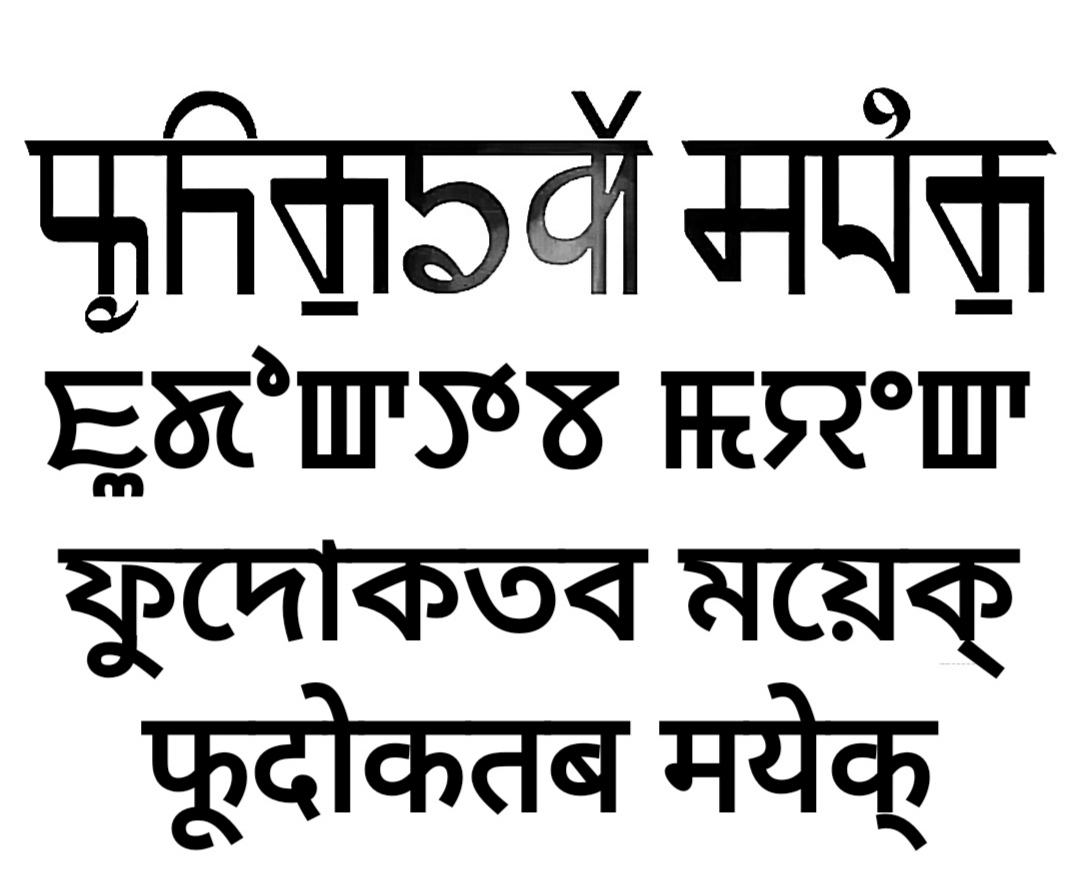
Transliterations of "Phudoktaba Mayek" in Naoriya Phulo script (invented Meetei Yelhou Mayek), traditional Meitei Mayek script, Bengali script, and Devanagari

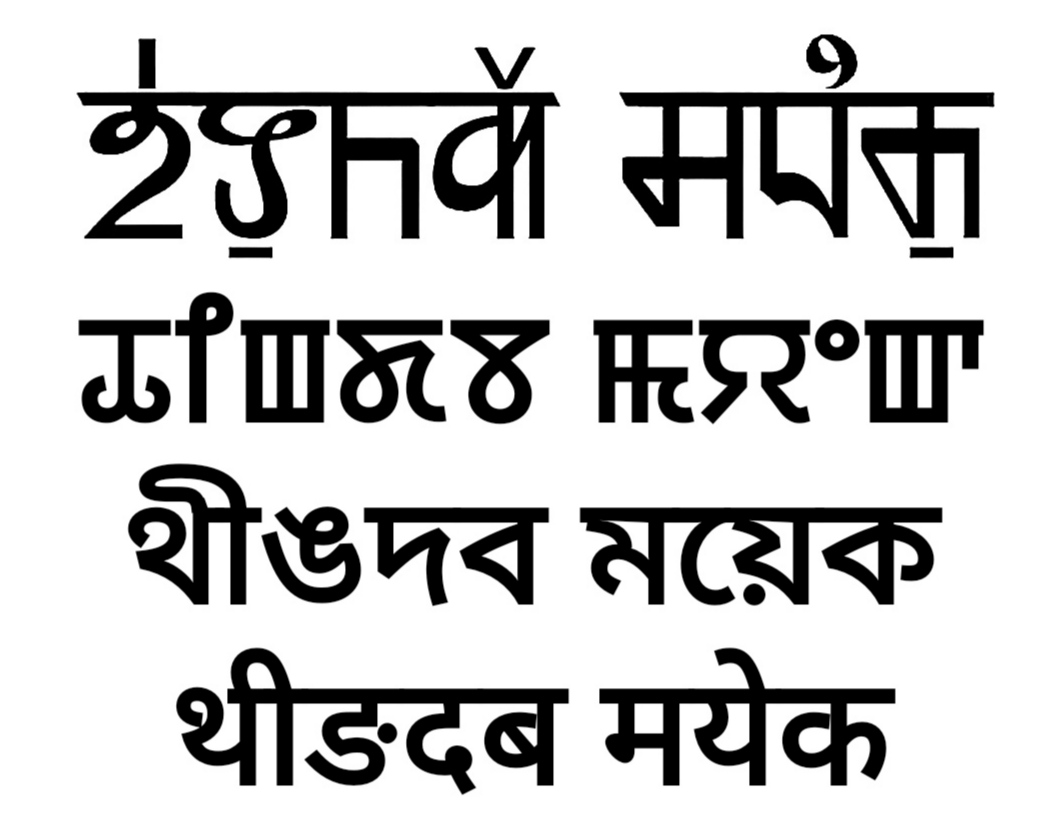
Transliterations of the term "Thingdaba Mayek" in Naoriya Phulo script (invented Meetei Yelhou Mayek), traditional Meitei Mayek script, Bengali script, and Devanagari

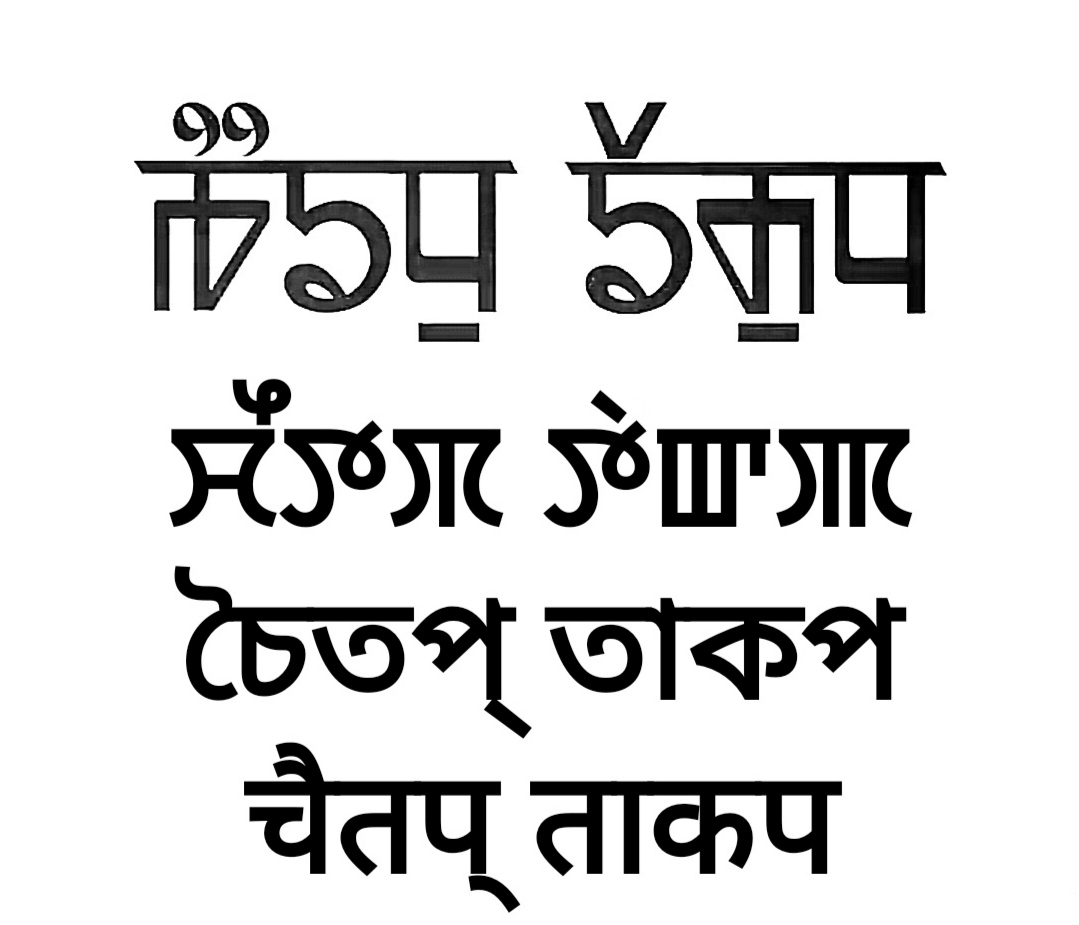
Transliterations of "Cheitap Taakpa" in Naoriya Phulo script (invented Meetei Yelhou Mayek), traditional Meitei Mayek script, Bengali script, and Devanagari

According to some scholars like Wahengbam Ibohal, the invented script of Naoriya Phulo seems to be a modified version of Devanagari script, using some letters of the generally approved Meitei script and Bengali script. There was no proper evidence of that script being used in any certain periods of history.

== Vowels ==
Naoriya Phulo Letters (along with Bengali equivalents)	Name(s) of the letter(s)	Meitei Mayek equivalents	Eastern Nagari equivalents	Devanagari equivalents	Latin equivalents
	OM	ꯑꯣ	ও	ओ	O
	ARA	ꯑ	অ	अ	A
	IRA	ꯏ	ই	इ	I
	RIK	not available	ঋ	ऋ	R̥
	UN	ꯎ	উ	उ	U
	AANG	ꯑꯥ	আ	आ	A
	EENG	ꯏ	ঈ	ई	Ī
	YEM	ꯑꯦ	এ	ए	Ē
	YEI	ꯑꯩ	ঐ	ऐ	Ei
	OUM	ꯑꯧ	ঔ	औ	Ou

== See also ==
- List of constructed scripts
- Naoriya Pakhanglakpa Assembly constituency
- Naoriya Pakhanglakpa
- Mayek (disambiguation)
