= Apokpa Marup =

- Type: Meitei
- Classification: Religious denomination
- Theology: Meitei philosophy, Meiteism
- Region: India (Manipur, Assam and Tripura), Bangladesh and Myanmar
- Language: Meitei language (Manipuri language)
- Founder: Laininghal Naoriya Phulo
- Origin: 1930 AD; Cachar, Assam
- Branched from: Sanamahism (Meitei religion)
- Other name: Apokpa Laining Marup
- Publications: Apokpa Mapu gi Tungnapham

The Apokpa Marup or the Apokpa Laining is a modern religious denomination of Sanamahism, the Meitei religion. The denomination was founded by Laininghal Naoriya Phulo in 1930 in Cachar, Assam. Its goal was reviving the suppressed old paganism of the Meitei.

== See also ==
- Sanamahi creation myth
- Lists of deities in Sanamahism
