= Laininghal Naoriya Phulo =

Meitei prophet Laininghan Naoriya Phulo
- Phundrei
- Born: 28 August 1888; Laishram Khul Mayai Leikai, Assam
- Died: 1941 (aged 52–53)
- Occupations: Philosopher and religious reformer
- Organization: Founded the Apokpa Marup in 1930, Cachar
- Known for: Revivalism of the antique paganism Sanamahism (Meitei religion) of the Meitei ethnicity
- Notable work: Apokpa Mapu Gi Tungnapham
- Title: Laininghan
- Family: Naorem

Laininghan Naoriya Phulo (born 28 August 1888) was a Meitei religious, social and political leader and the founder of the Sanamahism revivalist school of Apokpa Marup. According to Meitei doctrines, he was regarded as a prophet who was born to preserve and revive the suppressed ancient paganism of the Meitei ethnicity. He is seen as an example for all Meiteis to follow. He invented a modern script (different from the present Meitei Mayek) to write Meitei language and its numerals taking help from the old script which he discovered from the Shakok Salai Thiren, based on the cosmic evolution of the Meitei mythology. Still today, people celebrate his birthday on the month of Thawan (August) according to Meitei calendar both in Assam and Manipur.

== See also ==
- Swami Vivekananda
- Muhammad
- Theodor Herzl

== Bibliography ==
- https://archive.org/details/in.ernet.dli.2015.310092
- https://archive.org/details/in.ernet.dli.2015.465301
- https://books.google.com/books?id=aAuKAAAAMAAJ&q=naoriya+phulo
