= List of Meitei princesses =

Daughters of the Meitei royal family

In the history of Manipur, a Meitei princess, also known as Manipuri princess (Meitei: ꯃꯖꯥꯏꯕꯦꯝꯃ, romanized: majāibemma), was a female member of the royal family belonging to the Meitei ethnic group (also known as the Manipuris), the dominant community of Manipur. Historically, Meitei princesses held positions within the sociopolitical and cultural framework of the Kingdom of Manipur, often involved in ceremonial functions and, at times, administrative affairs. Their roles and status were shaped by the traditional norms and hierarchical structures of Meitei society. At various points in history, Meitei princesses became queens in neighboring kingdoms, including the Ahom kingdom, the Burmese kingdom, the Kachari kingdom, and the Tripura kingdom, through diplomatic marriage alliances arranged between royal families.

== Titles ==
- "Majāibemma" (ꯃꯖꯥꯏꯕꯦꯝꯃ; /mə.jai.bem.mə/) is a respectful form of address used in the Meitei language for royal women such as princesses, queens, or noble ladies. The word is formed from the morphemes ma‑jā‑i‑bemma, where ma- means "third person plural," jā- means "offspring" or "child," i- stands for "first person plural" meaning "our," and bemma means "lady" or "woman." Taken together, the term can be interpreted as "our lady of their child(ren)," reflecting a formal and respectful way of referring to women of royal descent.
- "Tampha Wangamlon" (ꯇꯝꯐꯥ ꯋꯥꯡꯉꯝꯂꯣꯟ) or "Tamphasana" (ꯇꯝꯐꯥꯁꯅꯥ) is a title usually given to the oldest daughter of the Meitei king.
- "Yimom" (ꯏꯃꯣꯝ) is a term used to refer to both the daughter and the younger sister of a king.
- "Yimanlon" (ꯏꯃꯥꯟꯂꯣꯟ) is a term used to refer to the aunt of a king.

== Legendary princesses ==
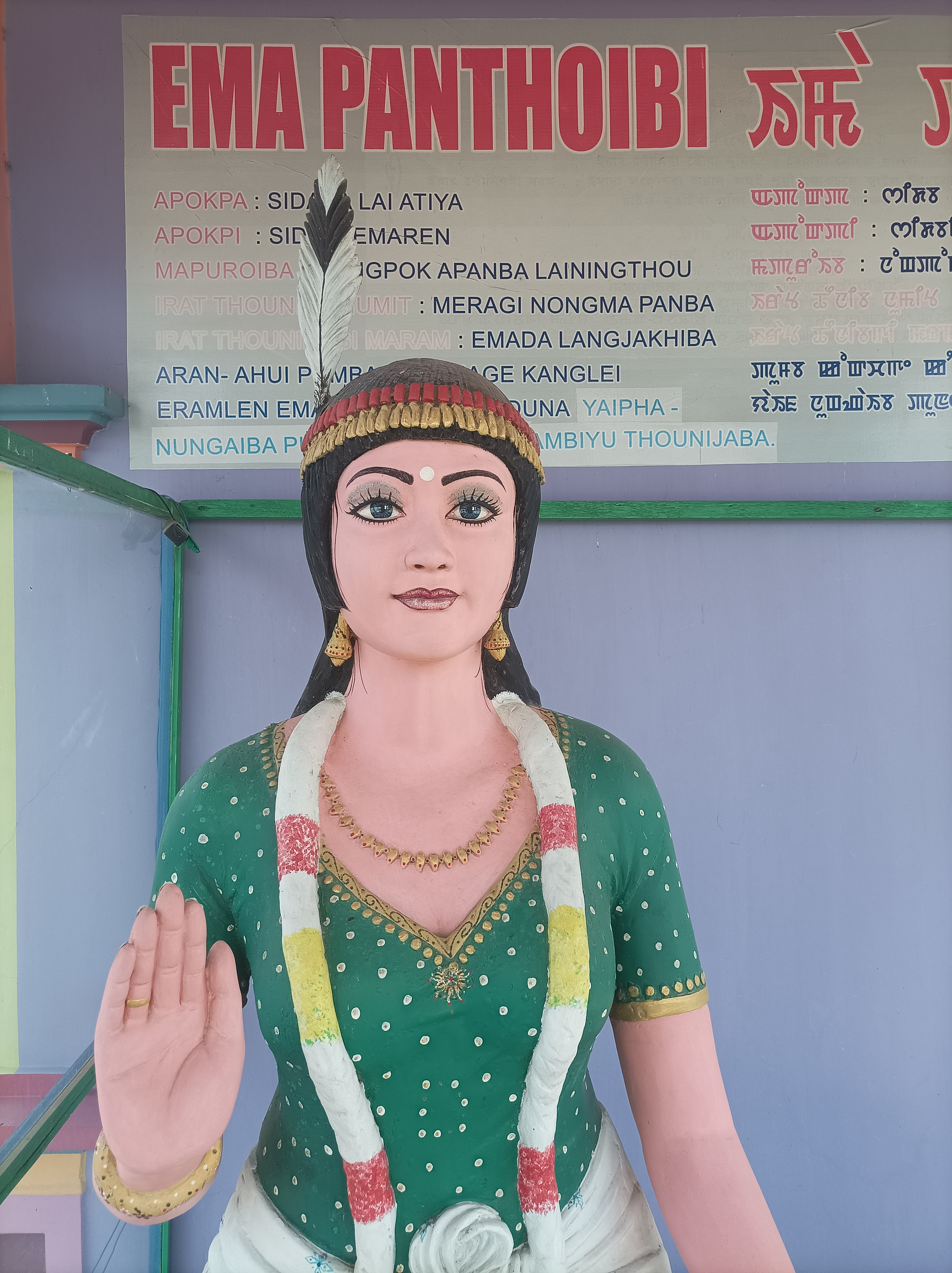
Statue of deified Meitei princess Panthoibi

Panthoibi (ꯄꯥꯟꯊꯣꯏꯕꯤ) was a Meitei princess from the Ningthouja dynasty. She was first married to Prince Tarang Khoinucha, the son of King Khaba Sokchrongba of the Khaba dynasty. Later, she married Nongpok Ningthou, the chief of the Selloi Langmai hills, also called the Nongmaiching hills. Panthoibi and Nongpok Ningthou were later worshipped as deities by the Meitei people, which led to the beginning of the Lai Haraoba festival.

Thoibi (ꯊꯣꯏꯕꯤ) was a princess of the Moirang royal family in the historic Ancient Moirang kingdom. She was noted for her abilities and appearance. She developed a romantic relationship with an orphan named Khuman Khamba, which led to a conflict with her suitor, Nongban. Eventually, she married Khamba. Her story is preserved in the Khamba Thoibi epic, including literary works like the Khamba Thoibi Sheireng and in the oral traditions of the Moirang Kangleirol.

== As the Queens of Assam ==
=== In Ahom kingdom ===
Kuranganayani (ꯀꯨꯔꯪꯒꯅꯌꯅꯤ) was a Meitei princess of the Ningthouja dynasty, the daughter of Gaurishyam, brother of King Jai Singh, also known as Ching-Thang Khomba or Bhagyachandra Karta Maharaj of the Manipur kingdom. She became the queen of the Ahom king Swargadeo Rajeswar Singha, also known as Surempha. After his death, she was remarried to his brother, Lakshmi Singha, who later became king. During a period of unrest, the Moamoria rebels overthrew and imprisoned the Ahom king. Kuranganayani played a key role in ending the rebellion by killing the rebel leader, Raghav Moran (Ragho Moran), during the night of the Bihu festival, leading to the restoration of the rightful Ahom ruler.

=== In Cachar kingdom ===
Induprabha (ꯏꯟꯗꯨꯄ꯭ꯔꯚꯥ), also spelled Induprava, was a Meitei princess of the Manipur kingdom and queen consort of King Krishnachandra of the Dimasa kingdom (Cachar kingdom) and the daughter of King Modhuchandra Singh of Manipur. She played a role in the spread of Hinduism in the Cachar kingdom, including the conversion of King Krishnachandra. She also contributed to maintaining diplomatic relations between Cachar and Manipur. Additionally, she was involved in the formation of the Manipur Levy, a military force organized by her relatives Gambhir Singh and Nara Singh to resist Burmese occupation during the period known as the Seven Years' Devastation. After the death of King Krishnachandra, the British administration recognized Induprabha as the Queen of Cachar in 1856.

== As the Queens of Burma ==
=== Chakpa Makhao Ngambi ===
Chakpa Makhao Ngambi (ꯆꯛꯄ ꯃꯈꯥꯎ ꯉꯝꯕꯤ) was a Meitei princess of the Ningthouja dynasty of the Manipur Kingdom (Kangleipak) and served as queen consort of the Toungoo dynasty in the Kingdom of Ava, located in present-day Upper Burma (Myanmar). She was married to King Taninganway Min, known in the Meitei language as Chekong Leimaba or Tongdoi Leimaba. Following the birth of her son, she abdicated her position as queen. She was a first-degree relative of King Charairongba of Manipur and a second-degree relative of his successor, King Pamheiba (Garib Niwaj). Her abdication contributed to a prolonged political conflict between the Meitei royal house (Ningthouja dynasty) and the Bamar monarchy (Toungoo dynasty).

=== Satyamala Devi ===
Satyamala Devi (ꯁꯇ꯭ꯌꯃꯂꯥ ꯗꯦꯕꯤ), also known as Nongleima (ꯅꯣꯡꯂꯩꯃ), was a Meitei princess of the Manipur Kingdom, the daughter of Khamlang Pamsaba (Wangkheirakpa), the brother of Maharaja Garibaniwaz (also known as Pamheiba). She was brought up by Garibaniwaz as his adopted daughter. During the reign of King Mahadhammaraza Dipadi of Burma, repeated diplomatic missions were sent to the Manipuri court requesting a royal marriage alliance. In response, Satyamala Devi was sent to Burma in 1749, where she became one of the queens of Mahadhammaraja Dipati, the last ruler of the Toungoo dynasty. She was conferred the title "Maha Devi." Her son, Khura Letpa, was later given the title Minye Sithu.

== As the Queens of Tripura ==
Not all queens of Tripura of Meitei ethnic background were princesses from the Manipur Kingdom. While a number of them came from non-royal or lay backgrounds, a significant proportion were Meitei princesses belonging to the royal family of Manipur. These royal marriages formed part of broader political and cultural interactions between the kingdoms of Manipur and Tripura.

- Hariseswari (ꯍꯔꯤꯁꯦꯁ꯭ꯋꯔꯤ) was a Meitei princess of the Manipur Kingdom and the daughter of King Bhagya Chandra, also known as Joy Singh, who ruled during the periods 1759–1761 and 1763–1798. She became the queen consort of Rajdhar Manikya II, the ruler of the Tripura Kingdom from 1785 to 1804. During a pilgrimage to various religious sites in India, King Bhagyachandra visited Agartala, the capital of Tripura. During his stay, he arranged the marriage of his daughter Hariseswari to King Rajdhar Manikya II.
- Chandrakola (ꯆꯟꯗ꯭ꯔꯀꯣꯂꯥ), Vidhukola (ꯋꯤꯙꯨꯀꯣꯂꯥ), and Akhileswari (ꯑꯈꯤꯂꯦꯁ꯭ꯋꯔꯤ) were daughters of King Marjit Singh of the Manipur Kingdom. They were married to Krishna Kishore Manikya, the ruler of the Tripura Kingdom from 1829 to 1849. Krishna Kishore Manikya was himself the son of a Meitei queen, reflecting continued dynastic and matrimonial ties between the royal houses of Manipur and Tripura.
- Ratnamanjuri (ꯔꯇ꯭ꯅꯃꯟꯖꯨꯔꯤ), also known as Dhaka Rani (ꯙꯥꯀꯥ ꯔꯥꯅꯤ), was a Meitei princess and a daughter of Meitei King Debendra Singh. She became a queen consort of Tripuri King Radha Kishore Manikya, who ruled from 1896 to 1909 and was the son of a Meitei queen. In 1874, during a visit to Dhaka by King Bir Chandra Manikya of Tripura, he met Meitei King Debendra Singh and his daughter Ratnamanjuri. Subsequently, Ratnamanjuri married Crown Prince Radhakishore and relocated to Agartala. She was also referred to as Dhaka Rani by the Meitei people in Tripura. Ratnamanjuri was the mother of Birendrakishore Manikya, who succeeded the throne of Tripura.

== In performing arts ==
Shija Laioibi (ꯁꯤꯖꯥ ꯂꯥꯏꯑꯣꯏꯕꯤ), also referred to as Shija Lailotpi (ꯁꯤꯖꯥ ꯂꯥꯏꯂꯣꯠꯄꯤ) or Bimbabati (ꯕꯤꯝꯕꯥꯕꯇꯤ), was a Meitei princess and the daughter of King Rajarshi Bhagyachandra of medieval Manipur kingdom. She is historically recognized as the earliest performer of the Manipuri Rasa Leela dance at the Shree Govindajee Temple. During this performance, she is noted for being the first to wear the traditional potloi costume.

== In literature ==
=== Sanatombi ===
Sanatombi (ꯁꯅꯥꯇꯣꯝꯕꯤ) was the eldest daughter of Maharaja Surachandra Singh of Manipur. She was favored in childhood by her grandmother, Maharani Kumudini. As part of a royal arrangement, Sanatombi was married to Manikchand of the Nongmaithem family. The marriage was reported to lack personal affection. The narrative of Sanatombi's relationship with Lieutenant Colonel Henry St P Maxwell, the British political agent in Manipur, is depicted in the historical fiction work The Princess and the Political Agent, which employs a flashback narrative structure.

Princess Sanatombi, the eldest daughter of Meitei King Surchandra Singh of Manipur kingdom

=== Binodini Devi ===
Maharaj Kumari Binodini Devi (ꯃꯍꯥꯔꯥꯖ ꯀꯨꯃꯥꯔꯤ ꯕꯤꯅꯣꯗꯤꯅꯤ ꯗꯦꯕꯤ) was the youngest daughter of Sir Maharaja Churachand Singh, KCSI, CBE, ruler of the Manipur Kingdom, and Maharani Dhanamanjuri Devi. She was born on 6 February 1922. Binodini Devi was awarded the Padma Shri in 1976. Her historical novel Boro Saheb Ongbi Sanatombi, published in 1976, received the Sahitya Akademi Award in 1979. The English translation of the novel, titled The Princess and the Political Agent, was published in 2020 by Penguin Random House India.

== See also ==
- List of Meitei kings
- List of rulers of Moirang
- Women in Meitei civilisation
- Meitei marriage
- Meitei goddesses
- British princess

== Bibliography ==
- https://archive.org/details/dli.language.1337
- https://archive.org/details/dli.language.1338
- https://archive.org/details/dli.language.1339
