= House of Karta =

Royal house of the uncrowned Meitei extended royal family

House of Karta ꯀꯔꯇꯥꯃꯌꯨꯝ
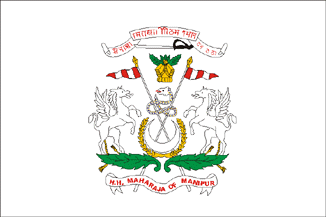
- Coat of Arms of the Ningthouja dynasty
- Parent family: Ningthouja dynasty
- Country: India
- Current region: Manipur and across
- Origin: Imphal
- Founder: Bhagyachandra
- Final ruler: Kulachandra Singh
- Historic seat: Kangla Palace
- Connected families: Mantrimayum; House of Nara Singh; Lourungpurelmayum; Urungpurelmayum
- Dissolution: 1891

The House of Karta (Meitei: ꯀꯔꯇꯥꯃꯌꯨꯝ, romanized: Kartaa mayuum, lit. 'Karta dynasty' IPA: /kər.taː.mə.juːm/) is one of the 5 royal houses of the Ningthouja dynasty of Manipur, India, alongside its counterpart, House of Nara Singh, with the latter being the current ruling house of Manipur. The House of Karta claims their descent from King Bhagyachandra (r. 1759-1761; 1763-1798). King Kulachandra Singh was the final ruler of the house but the family still lives on.

== History ==
The House of Karta traces its origin to King Bhagyachandra (1748–1798), who ruled Manipur from 1759 to 1761 and from 1763 to 1798. His reign took place during a period of repeated Burmese invasions and internal disputes within the royal family. During his exile in Assam, he formed political ties with the Ahom kingdom. He is also known for strengthening Meitei Vaishnavism, establishing major cultural practices such as the Raas Leela, and reorganising administration after returning to the throne. Although he could not complete all of his planned reforms, his policies shaped Manipur’s political and cultural direction in the late 18th century.

After Bhagyachandra’s abdication in 1798 and his death in the same year, his eldest surviving son Rabinchandra succeeded him. He was later assassinated by conspirators Prince Daoji and Gambhir Singh. After that, his younger brother Madhuchandra Singh immediately took over the throne and placed his younger brothers Chourajit Singh and Marjit Singh as the Yuvaraj and Senapati respectively. However, he was defeated and killed by Chourajit Singh with support from Marjit Singh. In the following years, Chourajit Singh and Marjit Singh had internal palace disputes and led to the latter being put on the throne after support from the Burmese, but also led to the Chahi Taret Khuntakpa, in which Gambhir Singh played a key role on freeing Manipur from the Burmese.

At various points, the throne alternated between the House of Karta and the House of Nara Singh, another branch of the Ningthouja family. The House of Karta ruled from 1763 upto the first reign of Gambhir Singh in 1821 and from 1822 to 1823, Joy Singh, the grandson of Prince Ananta Sai ruled. Until 1825, the House of Nara Singh ruled under Burmese occupancy (1819-1825). (Note: Three House of Nara Singh rulers during Burmese occupancy were: Yadu Singh (son of king Badra Singh, 1823); Ragav Singh (son of king Yadu Singh, 1823-1824); and Badra Singh (1824-1825).) Then, the House of Karta regained its rule from the restoration of Gambhir Singh as the king of Manipur from 1825 to 1844 (Nara Singh was the regent of young King Chandrakirti Singh, 1834-1844). After that, The House of Nara Singh became the rulers with Nara Singh reigning from 1844 to 1850 until his brother Debindro Singh in 1850. The House of Karta again returned to reign from the second reign of Chandrakirti Singh in 1850, upto the reign of the last ruler of the house, Kulachandra Singh in 1891.

The House of Nara Singh came back to prominence after that when the British chose young boy Churachand Singh as the king.

Both the House of Karta and the House of Nara Singh trace their descent from King Pamheiba.

== Historical significance ==
=== Cultural contributions ===
During the reign of Bhagyachandra, the Ras Leela dance was organized as a court tradition. It included themes from Vaishnavism and was later recognized as a classical form of Manipuri dance. When Bhagyachandra adopted Vaishnavism, he also built temples and instituted devotional rituals, many of which are still practiced in modern-day Manipur.

=== Political influence ===
Members of the House of Karta have been involved in Manipur's political events. Bhagyachandra's youngest son, Gambhir Singh, spearheaded attempts to re-establish the kingdom after the early 19th-century Burmese invasions.

== List of Karta monarchs ==
Portrait	Name	Reign		
Portrait	Name	From	To	Duration
	Bhagyachandra (b. 1748 – d. 1798)	4 April 1759	1761	1–2 years
	Bhagyachandra (b. 1748 – d. 1798)	6 September 1763	5 February 1798	34 years, 152 days
	Labanyachandra	5 February 1798	10 January 1801	2 years, 339 days
	Madhuchandra Singh (b. 1764 – d. 1804)	10 January 1801	18 March 1804	3 years, 68 days
	Chourajit Singh	18 March 1804	27 March 1814	10 years, 9 days
	Marjit Singh	6 April 1814	9 December 1819	5 years, 247 days
	Herachandra (Burmese occupancy)	1820	1821	less than 1-1 year
	Yumjaotaba (Burmese occupancy)	February 1821	April 1821	1–2 months
	Gambhir Singh (Burmese occupancy)	April 1821	October 1821	5–6 months
	Chinglen Nongdrenkhomba (Independent ruler) (b. 1788 – d. 1834)	12 June 1825	9 January 1834	8 years, 211 days
	Chandrakirti Singh (Ningthempishak)	9 January 1834	27 January 1844	10 years, 18 days
	Chandrakirti Singh (KCSI) (b. 1831 – d. 1886)	3 July 1850	17 May 1886	35 years, 318 days
	Surachandra Singh	17 May 1886	7 September 1890	4 years, 113 days
	Kulachandra Singh	9 September 1890	27 April 1891	230 days

== Karta Crown Princes ==
Portrait	Name	Birth and Death		
Portrait	Name	Birth	Death	Lifespan
	Tikendrajit Singh Koireng Sana	29 December 1856	13 August 1891	34 years, 227 days

== See also ==
- Meitei royal etiquette
- List of Meitei princesses
