= Yumjaotaba =

Meitei Prince

- Ibungosicha (Ibungoshija)
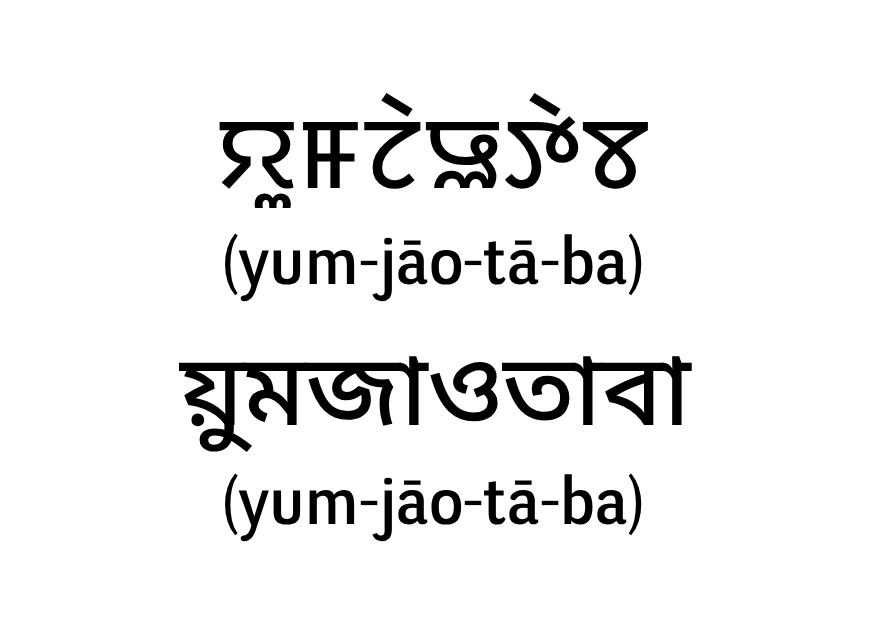
- "Yumjaotaba" in Meitei script and Bengali script.
Names
- Pitambar Singh, Yumjaosana
Regnal name
- ꯄꯤꯇꯝꯕꯔ ꯁꯤꯡꯍ
- House: House of Karta
- Dynasty: Ningthouja dynasty
- Father: Madhuchandra
- Mother: Konsam Chanu
- Religion: Traditional Meitei religion
- Occupation: Prince of Manipur

Yumjaotaba (Meitei: ꯌꯨꯝꯖꯥꯎꯇꯥꯕ, romanized: Yum-jaao-taa-ba) (Note: In Cheitharon Kumpapa Volume 2 by Saroj N. Arambam Parratt, he is referred to as "Yimchaotapa".) was a Meitei prince of Manipur Kingdom, which was under the Burmese Empire. He played a significant role in the effort to liberate Manipur from the Burmese during the Seven Years Devastation.

== Family ==
Yumjaotaba was the 4th son of King Madhuchandra, the second son of King Bhagyachandra. Yumjaotaba was born to Queen Konsam Chanu. Yumjaotaba was the elder brother (cousin) of Prince Herachandra.

== War tactics in 1820 ==
Yumjaotaba was assigned by his uncle, Chourjit Singh to support the guerrilla war against the Burmese. In 1820, Yumjaotaba arrived in Maklang. He was warmly welcomed by Herachandra. After conferring, the two princes made the decision to expel the foreign foe. Herachandra had 800 soldiers, 50 cavalry horses, 5 swords, and 12 muskets at the time. The sword, spear, and shield were the standard weapons used by his force. The dreaded weapon used by the cavalry against the Burmese was the Arambai. So, Yumjaotaba gave Herachandra 5 swords, 3 muskets, and 2 horses.

Yumjaotaba suggested meeting Kane Woon, the Burmese commander, pretending to ask for assistance. He approached the Commander by telling him that he was the son of King Madhuchandra (Modhuchandra) who was an ally of the Burmese, and stayed in the Burmese stockade for five days. Kane Woon revealed that a shortage of food grains was causing starvation among the Burmese. So, Yumjaotaba and 100 Burmese soldiers went to collect paddy at Sekmai.

Kane Woon was delighted by the prince's gesture. In exchange, he offered him the Manipur throne. Yumjaotaba accepted this alliance. He received 2 parasols, 2 silver-coated swords, 20 muskets, and 50 horses from Kane Woon. He then went to Herachandra with 200 Burmese soldiers, 40 cavalries and 20 rifles to Heiyen village. Then, the two princes killed all of the 200 Burmese soldiers.

The guerrillas killed Burmese soldiers at Chaobok and established positions from Uchiwa Khundon to Heiyel close to Loktak Lake.

== Reign ==
Another group of Burmese soldiers invaded Manipur in November 1820. There were thousands of them. Pakha Woon used 10,000 soldiers to attack Kakching. Despite retreating to Thoubal Moijing, Herachandra was vanquished by the vast army. After eight months of fighting, he and Yumjaotaba fled to Cachar. Many Manipuris were captured by Kane Woon and Pakha Woon. The two commanders installed Huidrom Shubol on the Manipur throne while the two princes were away. After returning to Manipur, Herachandra vanquished Huidrom Shubol, who then submitted to him. Yumjaotaba also returned to Manipur and was greeted by Herachandra and Huidrom Shubol.

Yumjaotaba took the throne rather than returning it to his uncle, Chourjit Singh. He ruled for several months. Other Manipur princes were upset to hear this news.

== Abdication ==
In April 1821, after learning that his nephew Yumjaotaba had ascended to the throne, Gambhir Singh left Cachar with a small force and deposed Yumjaotaba. After that, Gambhir Singh ascended to the throne, while Yumjaotaba fled to Burma and spent his life in Ava.

Yumjaotaba met Captain Pemberton while he was in Ava for the Kabaw Valley negotiations.

== Legacy ==
The dialogue "How has this country been ravaged?" by Herachandra and "Alright, we fight on" by Yumjaotaba, as mentioned in the royal chronicle Cheitharol Kumbaba, shows the determination of the Meitei resistance against the powerful Burmese army.

The liberation of Manipur was carried out under the help of Meitei princes like Yumjaotaba. He stands as an important figure in the history of Manipur's struggles against the Burmese Empire.

== In popular culture ==
Yumjaotaba's story and patriotism are also told in the Meitei language film Mareibak Ningba Herachandra (Herachandra the Patriot), in addition to Herachandra's story. It depicts the valiant battles the two princes fought to liberate Manipur from Burma during the Chahi Taret Khuntakpa.

== Bibliography ==
- Koireng Singh, Aheibam; Hanjabam, Shukhdeba Sharma; Thangjam, Homen (2015). Self Determination Movement in Manipur. Conflict and Human Rights Studies Network, Manipur. ISBN 9789351250975.
- Somorjit Sana, Rajkumar (2011). The Chronology of Meetei Monarchs: From 1666 CE to 1850 CE. Waikhom Ananda Meitei. ISBN 9788184652109.
- Sanajaoba, Naorem (1988). Manipur, Past and Present: Philosophy, Culture and Literature. Volume 2. Mittal Publications. ISBN 978-8183244350.
- Sanajaoba, Naorem (1988). Manipur, Past and Present: The Heritage and Ordeals of a Civilization. Volume 4. Mittal Publications. ISBN 9788170998532.
- Parratt, Saroj Nalini Arambam (2009). The Court Chronicle of the Kings of Manipur: Volume 2, The Cheitharon Kumpapa. Cambridge University Press. ISBN 9788175966383.
- Joykumar Singh, N (2002). Colonialism to Democracy: A History of Manipur 1819-1972. Spectrum Publications. ISBN 9788187502449.
- Joychandra Singh, L (1995). The Lost Kingdom: Royal Chronicle of Manipur. Prajatantra Publishing House.

== External books ==
- Suresh Singh, Th (2014). The Endless Kabaw Valley: British Created Vicious Cycle of Manipur, Burma and India. Quills Ink Publishing. ISBN 9789384318000.
