= Induprabha =

Meitei queen of Cachar Kingdom

- Sicha Mayang Reima (Note: also spelled as "Sicha Mayang Leima"), Maharani
- Tenure: 1802–1856
- Marriage: Govinda Chandra and Krishna Chandra
Era dates
- 1802–1856
- Royal family: Ningthouja dynasty
- Father: Modhuchandra Singh
- Religion: Meitei Vaishnavism
- Occupation: Queen of Kachari Kingdom (Dimasa kingdom) & Princess of Manipur Kingdom (Meitei kingdom)

Induprabha (ꯏꯟꯗꯨꯄ꯭ꯔꯚꯥ), also spelled as Induprava (ꯏꯟꯗꯨꯄ꯭ꯔꯋꯥ), was a Meitei queen of Kachari kingdom and a princess of Manipur kingdom. She was the consort of Dimasa king Krishnachandra of Cachar (in modern day Assam state). She was the daughter of Meitei king Modhuchandra Singh of Manipur.

In Meitei royal chronicle, she was nicknamed as "Sicha Mayang Reima". Mayang Reima is a title for any Meitei queen of Cachar.

== Marriage ==
Princess Induprabha, daughter of King Modhuchandra Singh of Manipur, was married to King Krishnachandra of Cachar around 1802 CE. Following the death of King Krishnachandra, his brother Govindchandra ascended the throne and married Induprabha without her consent. This action caused discontent among both the Manipuri royal family (Ningthouja dynasty) and the people of Cachar.

Details of her wedding ceremony was recorded in the Meitei royal chronicle. The Cheitharon Kumpapa records the events as follows:

"The year of Thanga Khunchao 1723 Kum Sak... Friday, the 22nd Lamta (26th March 1802 CE), 275 people including the Bor Mantri (minister) of Cachar, Bor Sahip, and Hitakphu Phanpa Hitang brought fish for the Meetei princess to be married to the king of Mayang... The year of Laisram Achou Singh 1724 Kum Sak... Tuesday, the 17th Sachiphu (20th April 1802 CE), Sicha Mayang Reima (Induprava) left for Mayang (Cachar). She scattered Sen (coins) in the royal market place... Monday, the 4th Thawan (2nd August 1802 CE), Prince Phairapa, son of Meetingu Loiren Khompa, and Haopam the Nongthonpa, who went to escort the Mayang Reima, arrived."

— Cheitharol Kumbaba

According to the Cheitharol Kumbaba (4th ed., p.181), the Chief Minister of Cachar arrived with 275 men to deliver fish for the then future Queen of Cachar.

== Contribution to cultural heritage ==
Queen Induprabha (ꯏꯟꯗꯨꯄ꯭ꯔꯚꯥ) played a notable role in the cultural and religious transformation of Cachar. She introduced Meitei Vaishnavism to the region and opposed the prevailing practice of animal sacrifice. She facilitated the performance of Ras Lila by bringing artists and instructors from Manipur, thereby promoting Meitei cultural heritage traditions in Cachar. Under the influence of her paternal family, King Krishnachandra of Cachar accepted the Vaishnavite form of Meitei Hinduism. In 1790, both Krishnachandra and his brother Govindchandra formally converted to Hinduism. Their people followed their example, and most of the Kacharis in the area also became Hindus.

== Contribution to international relations ==
Induprabha contributed to the maintenance of diplomatic relations between Cachar and Manipur. She was also involved in the formation of the Manipur Levy force, organized by her relatives, Gambhir Singh and Nara Singh, aimed at liberating Manipur from Burmese occupation, better known as the Chahi Taret Khuntakpa (or Seven Years' Devastation).

Induprabha's three relatives, Gambhir Singh, Marjit Singh, and Sarjit Singh, played important roles in the relationship between the two kingdoms.

Govindchandra, the king of Cachar, was weak. He had no real power or strong army, and people did not support him. He was known for running away during difficult times. The people of Cachar believed that their lives and property would be safer and the kingdom would improve if the stronger Manipuri princes took charge.

With support from local leaders like Gulu Mia and Barjuram, Gambhir Singh attacked the capital of Cachar in 1818. Govindchandra ran away to North Cachar without a fight, and the Manipuri rulers took control of the Cachar plains.

== Relation with the Britishers ==
After the death of King Krishnachandra, the British administration recognized Induprabha as the Queen of Cachar and granted her a monthly pension of Rs. 196 in 1856.

== Legacy ==
=== In Meitei literature ===
Maharani Induprabha is a historical novel authored by Kambrambam Nilakanta Singh, noted for its literary and historical significance.

In the novel Ladies in The Palace Trilogy - Ningthemnubee Trilogy, written by BM Maisnamba, Lady Induprava (ꯏꯟꯗꯨꯄ꯭ꯔꯚꯥ) is described as follows:

... Woman is a weapon of the war! Woman begets war. Woman can stop the war. ... What a capacity, the woman is. We can entrust the administrative policy on the woman. We can ramify the clan on the woman. We can extend and ramify the boundary of the country. The elder in-law of my husband, Maharaj Budhachandra's daughter Induprava was betrothed to the sons of Cachar King. My daughter Induprava has become the beloved wife of the two brothers - Krisnachandra and Gobinchandra- of the Cachar King. This is politics! ...

— Ponglembee, Ladies in The Palace Trilogy - Ningthemnubee Trilogy

=== In an educational institution ===
Women’s College, Silchar, was renamed in honor of Kachari queen Rani Induprabha. The renaming recognizes her historical significance, particularly her contributions to the cultural and religious transformation of the Kachari kingdom and her role in maintaining diplomatic ties between Cachar and Manipur.

== See also ==
- Ahom–Meitei relations
  - Kuranganayani
- Meitei people in Assam
  - Meitei language in Assam
- Meitei people in Tripura
  - Meitei queens of Tripura
- Burmese–Meitei relations
  - Meitei–Shan relations
  - Seven Years' Devastation
  - Manipur Levy
