= Haodijam Chaitanya =

Indian social and literary reformer

Haodijam Chaitanya (ꯍꯥꯎꯗꯤꯖꯝ ꯆꯩꯇꯅ꯭ꯌꯥ), also known as Haodijamba Chaitanya (ꯍꯥꯎꯗꯤꯖꯥꯝꯕꯥ ꯆꯩꯇꯅ꯭ꯌꯥ), or Haodeijamba Chaitanya Singha, was an early social and literary reformer from Manipur. He played an important role in social movements, public service, and the early development of printed literature in the Meitei literature (Manipuri language).

== Early life ==
Haodijamba Chaitanya was born as Haodijam Chaitanya Singh in Shillong in 1867. He was the son of Haodijam Gokul Singh, also called Polando Singh, who worked as a syce (horsekeeper) for Col. Kittinge, the Chief Commissioner of Assam, during the rule of Maharaja Chandrakirti Singh. His family title was Haodijam, which led to the form Haodijamba Chaitanya.

Chaitanya studied in a mission school and grew up in a cosmopolitan environment. He became fluent in Bengali, English, and Hindustani, along with his own language. Because of his education and upbringing in a city, he was considered more advanced in outlook than many people of his time.

After fifteen years of service in a government office, his father returned to Imphal. Soon after the Anglo-Manipuri War of 1891, Chaitanya worked as a postal overseer on the Cachar–Manipur Road. In 1895, he joined the State Office (later the State Secretariat) as a Tehsildar Clerk.

== Social reform activities ==
=== Opposition to slavery and abuse of power ===
Chaitanya first opposed the actions of royalty and nobility who ignored British orders banning the keeping of slaves. When the king's elder brother was involved in an incident, Chaitanya worked with the police, with support from the Political Agent, and succeeded in freeing two bonded slaves.

He also appealed to the Political Agent to stop the queen mother from making harmful appointments and dismissals in offices and royal institutions. This action helped reduce public dissatisfaction.

=== Conflict with Maj. Maxwell ===
In 1892, Maj. Maxwell, who later became the Political Agent of Manipur, took Sanatombi, daughter of former Maharaja Surchandra Singh and wife of Nongmaithem Manikchand, as his concubine. This shocked orthodox Manipuri society, especially because a woman of royal blood was living with a foreigner.

With Chaitanya's help, Manikchand submitted a strong complaint to Maxwell, accusing him of adultery and requesting compensation for marriage expenses. Maxwell suspected Chaitanya's involvement and removed him from his job. When he returned as Political Agent in 1900, he expelled Chaitanya from Manipur on weak grounds.

Chaitanya appealed to the Viceroy of India and was allowed to return in 1905.

=== Later exile ===
Chaitanya later led a people's movement to end forced labour in Manipur. Because of this, he was expelled again in 1915 by Col. Cole, the Political Agent at the time. His appeals for return and for a pension were ignored, and he lived the rest of his life in poverty in Cachar.

== Character and interests ==
Official records state that Chaitanya was competent and dutiful in his service. Although he earned a modest income and lived simply, he enjoyed hunting on horseback. He was deeply aware of the cultural heritage of his people.

== Contribution to Meitei literature ==
Chaitanya played a leading role in the early printing of Manipuri books in the vernacular language, using Bengali script. This was notable at a time when printing presses were rare in the region.

A Manipuri translation of the Bible in Devanagari script had been printed at Serampore in 1824, but it was not widely circulated.

=== Published works ===
Chaitanya is credited with four published works:

1. Khamba Thoibigi Warini (1899)

2. Khahi Ngamba (1900)

3. Thakhel Ngamba (1902)

4. Chingthangkhomba (1902)

Another work, Manipurer Itihas, describes the history of Manipur beginning from Hindu mythology. Because the book has no author's name, its authorship is uncertain, though its prose style suggests Chaitanya's influence. It was printed by the Baptist Mission and published by the Political Agent, Manipur, in 1890. It is considered the first printed work in Manipuri about Manipur in Bengali script.

=== Description of works ===
Khamba Thoibigi Warini

This book describes the ideal love story of Khamba and Thoibi. Chaitanya said it was a transliteration of an old text in the indigenous script, but its style and content suggest otherwise. The prose is simple and resembles paraphrased versions commonly sung by professional ballad singers.

The work includes details rarely mentioned elsewhere, such as the marriage of Khamnu (Khamba's elder sister) to Pheirojamba, the birth of their child, and the tragic end of Khamba and Thoibi. Chaitanya also used punctuation and chapter headings, which were largely absent in traditional manuscripts.

Khahi Ngamba

This is a prose version of an original manuscript. Chaitanya showed a good knowledge of Old Manipuri and wrote in a distinct Modern Manipuri style. Apart from small differences—such as the absence of the opening prayer, new names for the king and his men, and the omission of a note about its composition during Maharaja Chandrakirti's time—the content closely follows the original. It was printed by Abdul Raham at the Chronicle Press, Sylhet.

Thakhel Ngamba

This is also a prose version of an original manuscript, with only two important differences. Chaitanya addressed the opening prayer to Hindu gods instead of Meitei deities and the king, and he omitted the part where King Garibniwaj takes a new name after conquering Samsok in Burma. It was printed by Charuchandra Ghosh at the Chronicle Press, Sylhet.

Chingthangkhomba

Chaitanya's last published work retells the life story of the Meitei king Chingthangkhomba. It includes episodes such as:

- the Moirang king's demand for land
- the Burmese invasion supported by the Moirang king
- the capture of princes Labyanachandra and Modhuchandra
- Chingthangkhomba's stay at the Assamese court
- his taming of a wild elephant
- his return to Manipur after defeating the Burmese
- the death of his maternal uncle
- the installation of the idol of Sri Krishna after a divine command in a dream

The language includes some Bengali words and shows Bengali influence in spelling. Even so, Chaitanya's works mark an important stage in the development of Manipuri prose and show the growth of Modern Manipuri.

== See also ==
- Lai Haraoba
- Umang Lai
- Khamba Thoibi Sheireng
- Numit Kappa
