= Meitei people in Bangladesh =

Meitei people in the Bangladesh

Bangladeshi Meiteis (Meitei people in Bangladesh) (Meitei: ꯃꯩꯇꯩ ꯀꯥꯡꯂꯨꯞ) (Bengali: মণিপুরী জাতি)
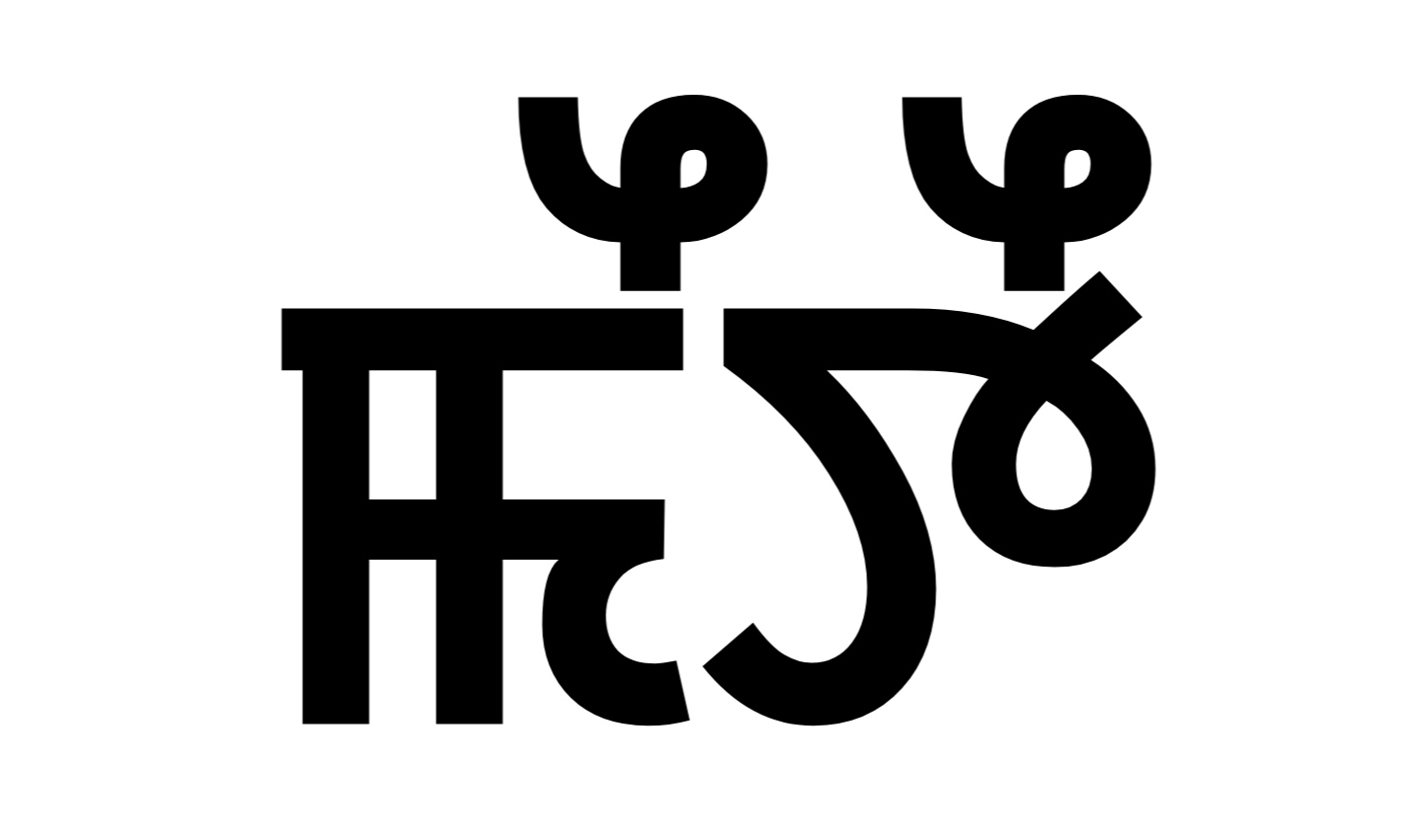

- Cultural flag of the Meiteis

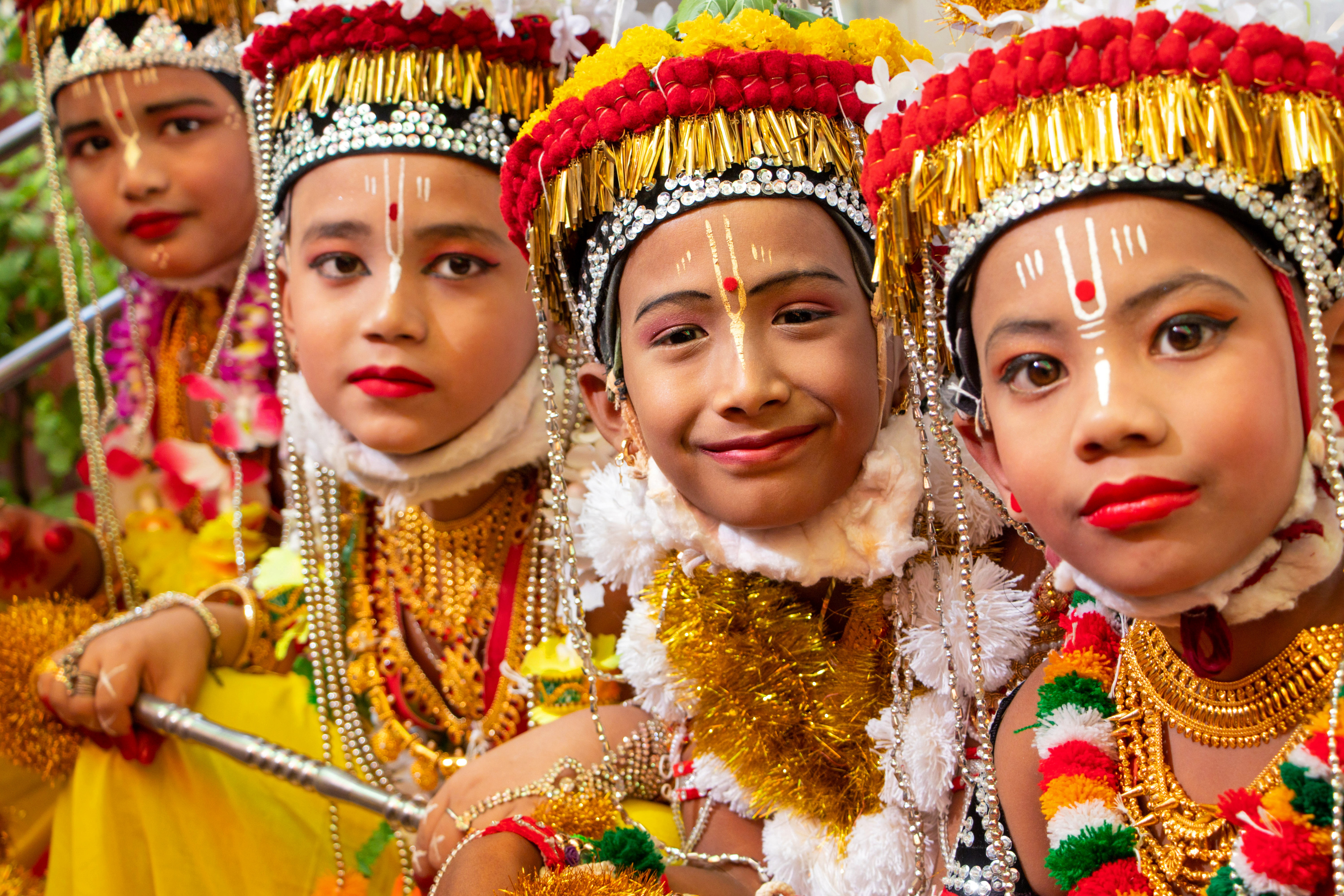
- Manipuri Raas Leela festival in Moulvibazar, Bangladesh

Total population
- 15,000 (2020)

Languages
- Meitei language (officially known as Manipuri language)

Religion
- Majority: Hinduism; Minority: Sanamahism, Islam

Related ethnic groups
- other Indian people and other Bangladeshis

Meitei people (Meitei: ꯃꯩꯇꯩ ꯀꯥꯡꯂꯨꯞ), also known as Manipuri people (Meitei: ꯃꯅꯤꯄꯨꯔꯤ ꯀꯥꯡꯂꯨꯞ), is one of the minority ethnic groups of Bangladesh. They live mostly in the Sylhet Division of the country. The Meitei of Bangladesh's population reached 15,000 in 2020

== History ==
Meiteis moved from Manipur to Bangladesh at different times because of wars, conflicts, and other reasons. They started moving during the rule of Meitei King Ching-Thang Khomba, also known as Rajarshi Bhagyachandra (1764-1789). The Manipuri-Burmese wars (1819-1825) made more people move. After the war, the Burmese ruled Manipur for about seven years (Chahi Taret Khuntakpa). During this time, King Chourjit Singh and his two younger brothers, Marjit Singh and Gambhir Singh, went to Sylhet. Many Manipuri people followed them. A palace was built for them in Mirzajangal, Sylhet town. During this time, Meitei people settled in Kasba of Brahmanbaria, Durgapur of Mymensingh, and Tejgaon of Dhaka. But now, these places are not special Meitei settlements. Most Meitei people now live in Sylhet town and its nearby areas, and in Kamalganj, Sreemangal, Kulaura, and Barlekha areas of Maulvibazar District; Chunarughat area of Habiganj District; and Chhatak area of Sunamganj District. Banglapedia mentions, "According to the 1991 Population Census, there are about 25,000 Manipuris in Bangladesh. Of them about 13,000 are in Maulvi Bazar, 7,000 in Sylhet and 4,000 in Habiganj."

== Language ==
There are possible signs of extinction of Meitei language (also known as Manipuri language) from use in the next generation as the Meiteis started becoming more fluent in speaking Bengali than their own language.

== Culture ==
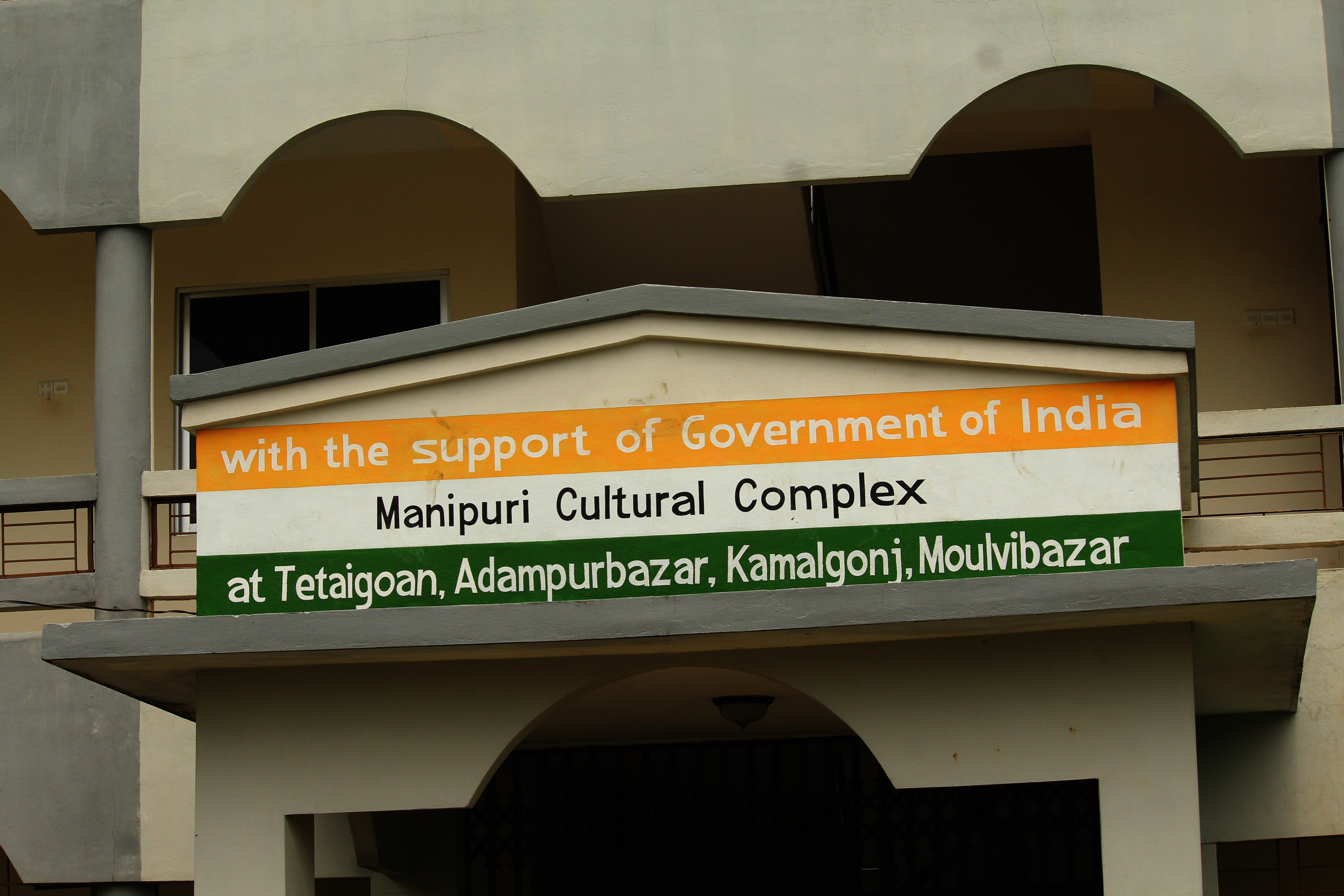
Manipuri Cultural Complex

Meiteis enjoy polo, boat racing, drama and dancing.

=== Agriculture ===
Most Meiteis of Bangladesh are farmers and grow rice, sugarcane, tobacco, oranges and pineapples. They usually built their houses near the riverbanks.

=== Clothing ===
Handloom is common among the Bangladesh Meiteis. Moirang Phee is a common clothing of the Meitei women. A new type of women's clothing was developed from banana fibres, and was named as "Kalabati". It was also recognised by the Prime Minister of Bangladesh.

=== Cuisine ===
Meiteis do not consume meat, except fish. In other words, they practise pescetarianism.

=== Festivals ===
Meitei festivals like Lai Haraoba and Ningol Chakouba are celebrated by the Meiteis of Bangladesh.

=== Matrimony ===
Meiteis do not marry a person of their own clan (Meitei: yek salai). So, they marry people of other clan.

=== Monuments ===
==== Manipuri Rajbari ====
Meitei kings built many shrines dedicated to traditional Meitei deities, including those of God Nongshaba, God Pakhangba and Goddess Yumjao Lairembi notably in the Manipuri Rajbari (Meitei: ꯃꯅꯤꯄꯨꯔꯤ ꯔꯥꯖꯕꯔꯤ) in Lama Bazar of Bangladesh. Moreover, there are palaces and tombs of the Meitei royalties in the Manipuri Rajbari of Lama Bazar.

==== Proposed monuments ====
The construction of a statue of Meitei King Gambhir Singh at Rajbari, Sylhet, and a museum for Meitei King Marjit Singh at Kamalganj, Moulvi Bazar, are proposed by the United Committee Manipur to the Chief Minister of Manipur.

=== Performing arts ===
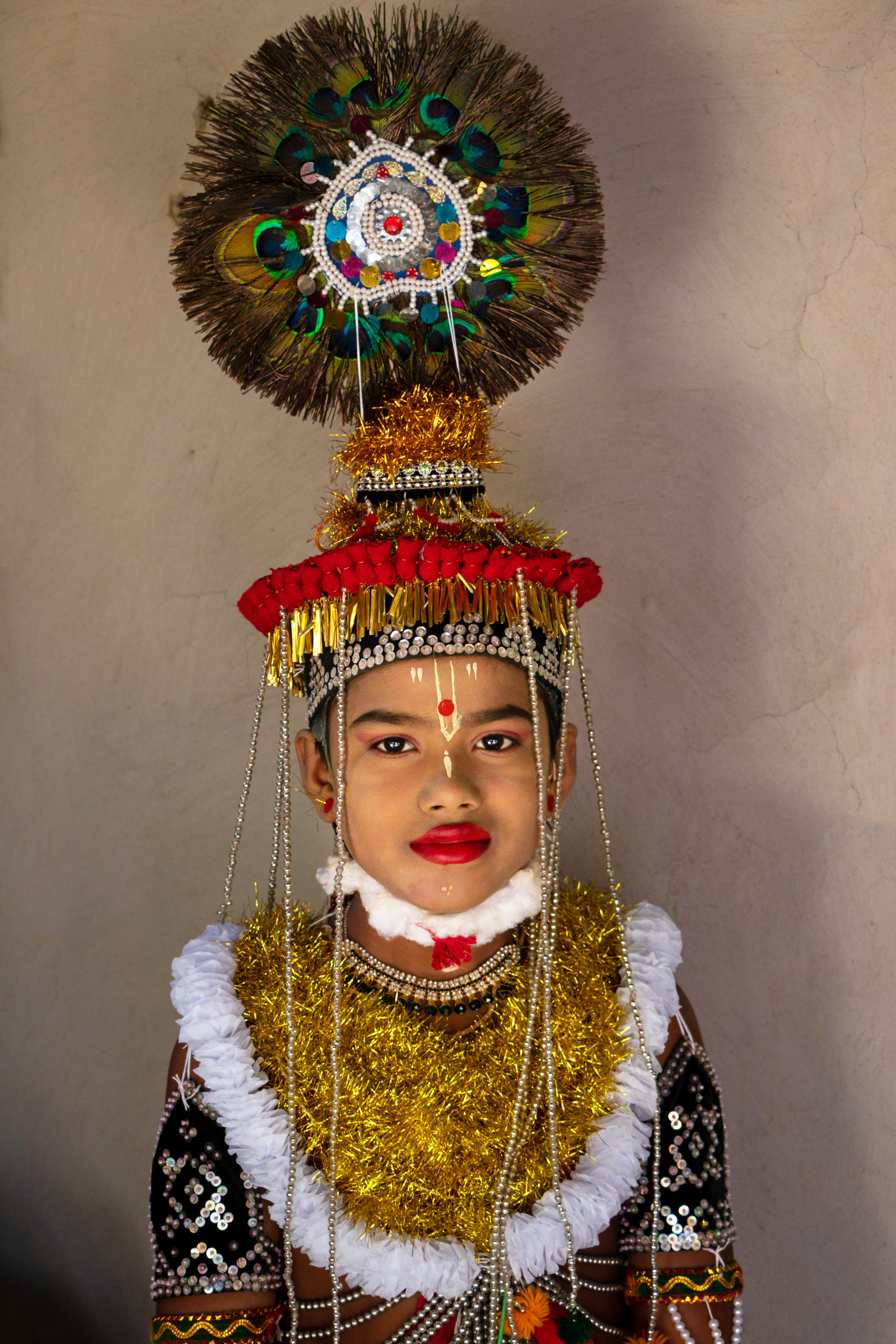
A Manipuri in Moulvibazar, Bangladesh

Dance is an important part of the Meitei cultural heritage. Traditional dances include Lai Haraoba, Khamba-Thoibi, Maibi Jagoi and Leisem Jagoi. Classical dances include Manipuri Raas Leela, Gostha leela, Udukhol and Mridanga. Thabal Chongba is also common among the Bangladeshi Meiteis.

=== Religion ===
Bangladeshi Meiteis are mostly Hindus but also practise traditional Meitei religion. Meitei rulers built many temples for traditional Meitei deities, especially those of God Nongshaba, God Pakhangba and Goddess Yumjao Lairembi in the soils of Bangladesh. The Lainingthou Sanamahi Temple Board (LSTB) is about to build a temple dedicated to traditional Meitei deity, Sanamahi, in Kunagaon of Bangladesh.

=== Sports ===
Bangladeshi Meiteis enjoy polo (Meitei: Sagol Kangjei), boat race (Meitei: Hiyang Tannaba), among many.

== Groups ==
- Bangladesh Manipuri Sahitya Sangsad

== See also ==
- Meitei people in Myanmar
