= Madhuchandra Singh =

- Meitei Ningthou; Maharaja of Manipur

King of Manipur
- Monarchy: 1801 - 1804
- Coronation: 17 Kalen 1801 (30 April)
- Predecessor: Labanyachandra
- Successor: Chourjit Singh
- Born: 1764
- Died: May 23, 1804 (aged 39–40)
- Spouse: 29 wives (19 issueless)
- Issue: Sana Naol Singh, Sana Pabritra Singh, Sana Mega Singh, Sana Yumjaotaba, Sana Nilambar Singh, Sanaton, Sana Hem Singh (sons); Induprabha (daughter)
Names
- Meidingu Tamlen Khomba Madhuchandra Singh
Regnal name
- Meidingu Tamlen Khomba
- House: House of Karta
- Dynasty: Ningthouja dynasty
- Father: Bhagyachandra
- Mother: Khayoiron Ngangbam Chanu Harimati
- Religion: Hinduism

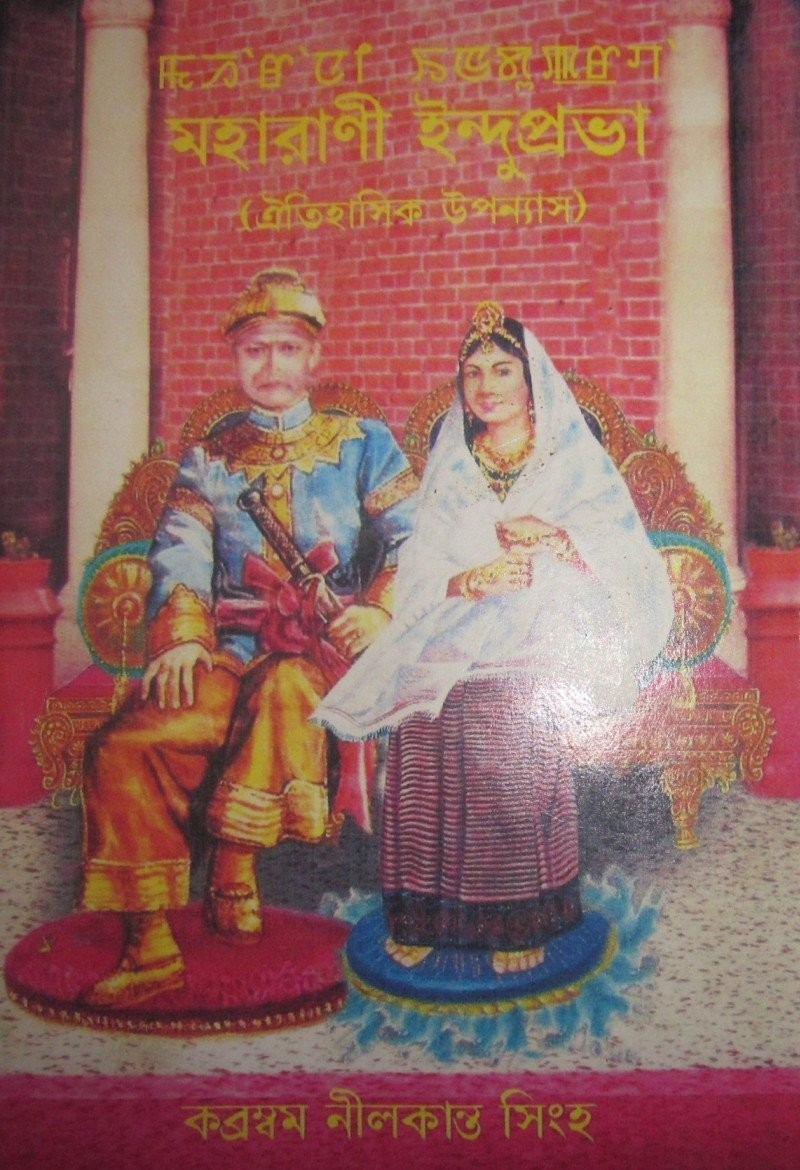
Induprabha with Krishna Chandra, King of Cachar.

Maharaja Madhuchandra Singh or Meidingu Tamlen Khomba (Meitei: ꯇꯝꯂꯦꯟ ꯈꯣꯝꯕ) was a king of the Ningthouja dynasty of Medieval Manipur who ruled from 1801 to 1804. He was the third son of King Bhagyachandra. Accordingly, he ascended the throne in 1800, but was crowned in 1801.

== Family ==
Madhuchandra Singh was the third son of King Bhagyachandra, born by Khayoiron Ngangbam Chanu Metuloikhombi Wairang Lamnembi (Harimati). Eventually after Bhagyachandra's death, his numerous sons fought for the throne.

Bhagyachandra had eight sons;

- Sanahal
- Labanyachandra
- Madhuchandra Singh himself
- Tulsijit
- Chourjit Singh
- Marjit Singh
- Daoji
- Gambhir Singh

== Reign ==
Madhuchandra became king at age 36, soon after his older brother, Labanyachandra was assassinated after a conspiracy by his younger siblings, Daoji and Gambhir Singh. Following his death, Madhuchandra took the throne, foiling the conspirators' plans. He made Kanchipur as the second capital as the kingdom. During his reign, he also introduced three coins made of bell metal He was crowned with his queen, Meitei Reima Yanglei Ngambi from the Haobam family. on 30th April 1801.

He made his two younger brothers, Chourjit Singh his Yuvaraja, or crown prince, and Marjit Singh the Senapati, or General. However, Chourjit Singh opposed Madhuchandra and went to Cachar in 1802.

=== Manufacture of muskets ===
There were no Burmese invasions during Madhuchandra's rule. However, some double-barrel guns were produced to improve the defense capability, continuing the process started during Bhagyachandra's reign. In April 1801, shortly after Madhuchandra's accession, the production of double-barrel guns commenced.

=== Religion and alliance with Cachar ===
In 1801, Tamlen Khomba placed a new image of Mahaprabhu in the temple of Bishnupur. He also built Shri Govindajee's chapel and new temples. Many Brahmins and royals made pilgrimages to the Ganga during his rule.

He maintained friendly ties with the Cachar in 1802 and married his beautiful daughter, Induprabha, to the King of Cachar, Krishna Chandra.

== Deposition and death ==
Crown Prince Chourjit, arrived in Nabadwip and joined forces with the ambitious young Senpati, 20-year-old Prince Marjit, to invade Manipur and depose Tamlen Khomba in 1804. Madhuchandra was dethroned and was forced to flee to Cachar. Chourjit then became King, with his mother, Chingakham Chanu Devahuti becoming the Queen Mother.

In order to reclaim his throne, Tamlen invaded Manipur with the assistance of the King of Cachar. To ensure victory, he worshipped Devi, the goddess of war, and spent the following night at Hiyangthang. Marjit moved forward and set up camp at Mayang Keinou with the royal army.

On Kalen 14, Madhuchandra arrived in Shamupan. After three hours of fierce fighting, Tamlen was killed in combat, along with 100 of his soldier. The royal army took 600 prisoners and captured 50 Ramjangees, 148 muskets, 100 swords, 100 shields, one bronze cannon, and one iron cannon.

== Bibliography ==
- Joykumar Singh, N (2002). Colonialism to Democracy: A History of Manipur, 1819-1972. Spectrum Publications. ISBN 9788187502449.
- Jhalajit Singh, R.K. A Short History of Manipur – via Internet Archive.
- Somorjit Sana, Raj Kumar (2010). The Chronology of Meetei Monarchs: From 1666 CE to 1850 CE. Waikhom Ananda Meitei. ISBN 9788184652109.
- Hodson, Thomas Callan (1908), The Meitheis, Harvard University – via archive.org
- Sanajaoba, Naorem (1988). Manipur, Past and Present: The Heritage and Ordeals of a Civilization. Volume 4. Mittal Publications. ISBN 9788170998532.
- Parratt, Saroj Nalini Arambam (2009). The Court Chronicle of the Kings of Manipur: Volume 2, The Cheitharon Kumpapa. Cambridge University Press. ISBN 9788175966383.
