= Kanchipur, Manipur =

Canchipur Langthabal
- Town
- Location in Manipur, India Canchipur (India)
- Coordinates: 24.90°N 94.00°E
- Country: India
- State: Manipur
- Capital [Temporary]: 1829 CE
- Founder: Maharaj Ghambir Singh

Languages
  - Official: Meitei
- Time zone: UTC+5:30 (IST)
- Vehicle registration: MN
- Nearest city: Imphal
- Website: manipur.gov.in

Kanchipur is a town in the Indian state of Manipur, and a suburb of the city of Imphal. During the reigns of Joy Singh and Gambhir Singh, Kanchipur served as Manipur's capital city. Currently, Manipur University is located within the town.

Kanchipur contains the Shri Radha Raman Temple of Kanchipur at the old Langthabal place on Hill Ridge near the Manipur University campus. It was dedicated by Maharaj Churachand in 1917. The temple structure is raised on a square pedestal, facing south. It is not in use now.
