= Nongmaithem =

Nongmaithem is one of the oldest Meitei family. The surname "Nongmaithem" has Indian Origins and is primarily associated with the Meitei community in Manipur, India. Members of this family inhabit different parts of the Imphal valley, notably in Imphal and others parts of Manipur valley.

Nongmaithem is a family under the Angom clan.

== Notable people ==
Notable people with this surname are:

- Langol Lukhoi, Maichou
- Nongmaithem Tomchaoba Singh Selungba, Member of the State Durbar
- Nongmaithem Syamacharan Singh Selungba, Member of the State Durbar
- Nongmaithem Ibotombi Singh, M.C.S., Sub-Divisional Officer, Chakpikarong
- Nongmaithem Ratanbala Devi, Indian women's professional footballer
- Nongmaithem Pahari, Indian singer, composer, lyricist, revolutionist
- Nongmaithem Biren Singh, Poet
- Nongmaithem Ibopisak, Historian
- Nongmaithem Tombi, Writer
- Nongmaithem Pramodini Devi, Historian and Writer
- Nongmaithem Manaoyaima, Historian
- Nongmaithem Narendra Singh, Poet
- Nongmaithem Nara, Historian and Writer
- Nongmaithem Hera Singh, Writer
- Nongmaithem Arunkumar, Writer
