= Haobam =

Haobam is a Meitei family name. Notable people with this surname are:

- Haobam Ongbi Ngangbi Devi, Indian classical dancer and musician
- Haobam Paban Kumar, Indian filmmaker
- Haobam Singh, Indian professional footballer
