= Rabinchandra =

Labanyachandra
- Ningthou
- Monarchy: 1798 CE - 1801 CE
- Coronation: 1798 CE
- Predecessor: Bhagyachandra
- Successor: Madhuchandra
- Born: Loirenkhomba
- Issue: Herachandra
- House: Ningthouja dynasty
- Father: Bhagyachandra
- Mother: Akham Chanu Bhanumati
- Religion: Meitei Hinduism
- Occupation: Monarch of the Manipur Kingdom

Rabinchandra, also known as Harshachandra, Labanyachandra, (died 1801) was a Manipuri King who ruled between 1798 and 1801. He was the son of Bhagya Chandra.

== See also ==
- List of Manipuri kings
- Manipur (princely state)

Preceded by Bhagya Chandra	King of Manipur; 1798–1801	Succeeded by Maduchandra Singh
