= Chourajit Singh =

Meitei King and Maharaja of Kangleipak

Chourjit Singh Chourajit Singh
- Ningthou & Maharaja
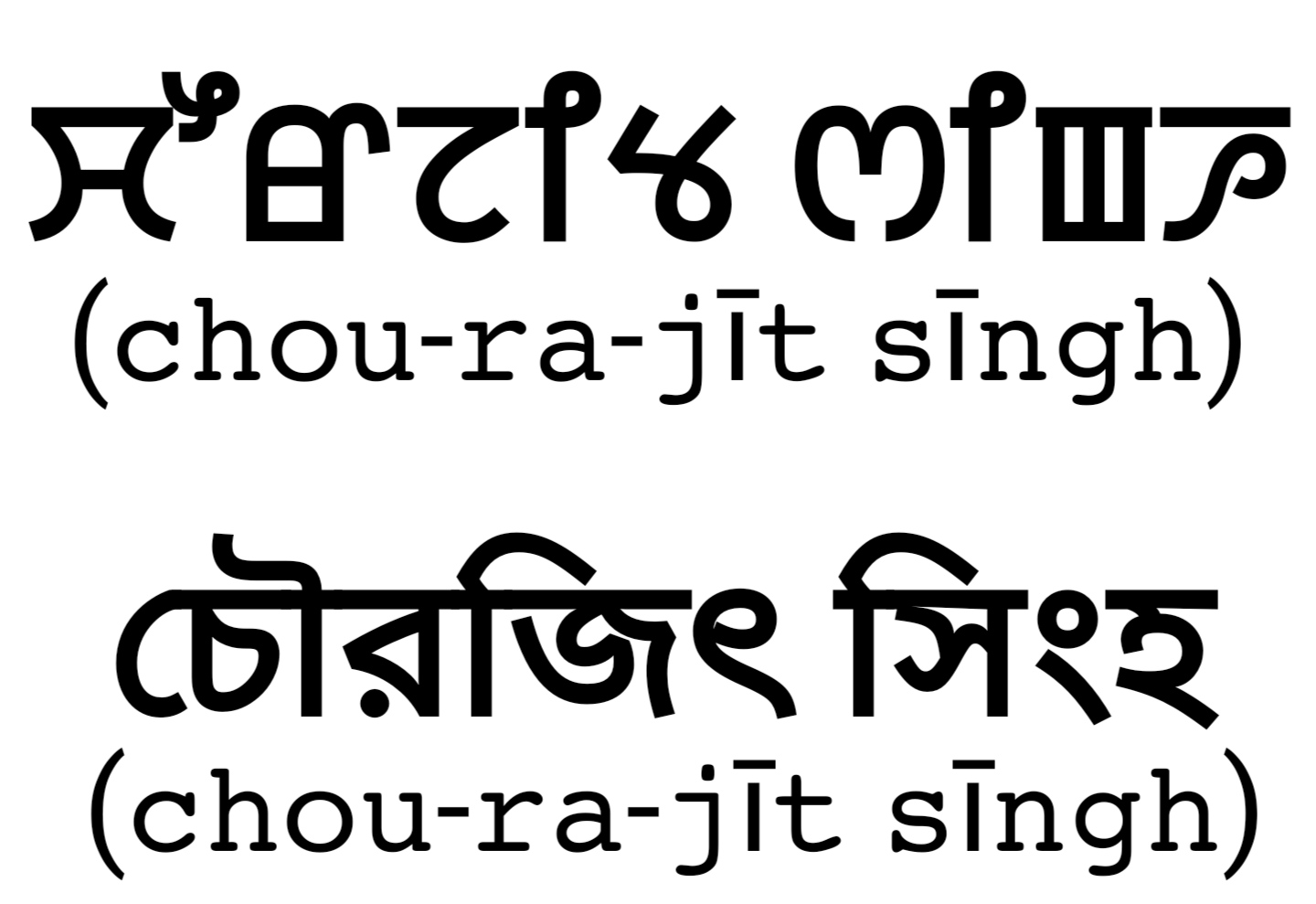
- Meitei and Bengali transliterations of "Chourajit Singh", the name of a Meitei King, the Maharaja of Kangleipak (Meitei for 'Manipur kingdom')
- Born: Kangleipak
- Died: Nabadwip
- Burial: Nabadwip
- royal: Ningthouja dynasty
- royal: Ningthouja dynasty
- Dynasty: Ningthouja dynasty
- Occupation: monarch

Chourjit Singh, also known as Charajit Singh, was a Meitei King and a Maharaja of Kangleipak (Meitei for 'Manipur kingdom'), who ruled between 1806 and 1812.

== See also ==
- List of Manipuri kings
- Manipur (princely state)

== Bibliography ==
- Hodson, Thomas Callan.The Meitheis. Harvard University, 1908.

Preceded by Maduchandra Singh	King of Manipur; 1806–1812	Succeeded by Marjit Singh
