= Gambhir Singh =

Monarch of Manipur (1788–1834)

- King of Manipur
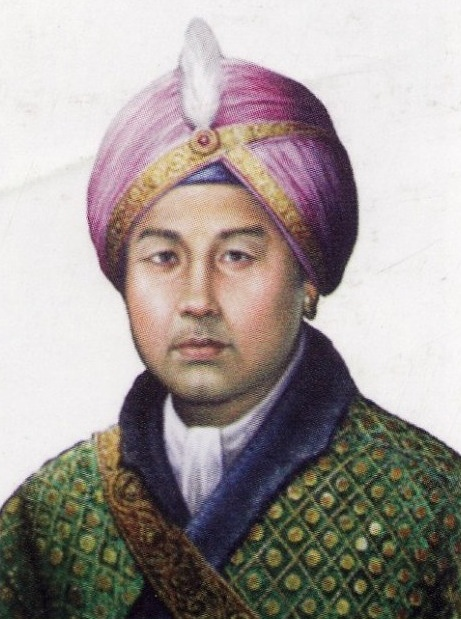

King of Manipur
- Reign: April 1821 to October 1821 and 12 June 1825 to 9 January 1834
- Coronation: 6 June 1831
- Predecessor: Badra Singh
- Successor: Chandrakirti Singh
- Born: Chinglen Nongdrenkhomaba; 5 March 1788; Canchipur, Imphal
- Died: 9 January 1834 (aged 47); Canchipur, Imphal
- Consort: Maipung Lanthabi, Maisnam Kumudini
- Issue: Chandrakirti Singh, Shija Tamphasana, Ibungshija Raj Singh
- House: House of Karta
- Father: Bhagyachandra
- Mother: Queen Khumong Mayum Chanu
- Religion: Meitei Vaishnavism

Chinglen Nongdrenkhomba (1788–1834), also known as Maharaja Gambhir Singh, was a ruler of the Manipur Kingdom.

== Biography ==
Gambhir Singh was a son of Bhagya Chandra. His rule was preceded by his brothers Labanyachandra, Madhuchandra, Chourajit Singh, and Marjit Singh. The last of these, Marjit SIngh, usurped the throne from Chourajit Singh with Burmese assistance, causing the latter to flee to Cachar. Gambhir Singh accompanied him to Cachar as a loyal lieutenant.

In Cachar, Gambhir Singh with the help of his elder brothers Chourjit and Marjit , ethroned Govinda Chandra, the king of Cachar. Govinda Chandra applied for the protection of the British East India Company. His request was refused. In consequence of which he applied to the King of Burma to reinstate him. Accordingly, in 1823 the king of Burma sendtla arge army into Cachar to arrest Chourjit, Marjit, and Gambhir Singh. The Burmese forces proceeded up to the territory of the British East India Company.

In March 1824, Lord Amherst, the then Governor General of British India declared war against Burma. In 1823, the British Government opened communications with Gambhir Singh; upon which 500 Meiteis under his command were taken into pay of the British Government and co-operated with the British troops in driving out the Burmese out of Cachar. This force of 500 men was known as Gambhir Singh Levy (later Manipur Levy). The Manipur Levy under Gambhir Singh and his second cousin Nara Singh, later Maharaja Nara Singh, played a key role in driving out the Burmese from Cachar and Manipur. The First Anglo-Burmese War was ended with the defeat of the Burmese. A peace treaty was signed between the Burmese and the British on 24 February 1826 known as the Treaty of Yandaboo. According to Article 2 of the treaty, Gambhir Singh was recognised as an independent ruler of Manipur. Gambhir Singh reigned until his death on 9 January 1834. He was succeeded by his infant son Chandra Kirti with Maharaja Nara Singh as regent.

== Religious policy ==
According to the Khaki Ngamba, on a Monday in either April or May 1829, Singh was passing through Sylhet as part of a British expedition against the Khasis. At the time, both the Muslim and Hindu communities of Sylhet were independently preparing processions — the Muslim community observing the Muharram commemorations, during which tazia processions were customary in Sylhet, and the Hindu community marking the festival of Rathajatra, which fell on the same day. The Faujdar of Sylhet, Ganar Khan, ordered the Hindu community to postpone their procession by one day. However, before any resolution could be reached, clashes broke out between members of the two communitie . Singh, who was a devout Vaishnava Hindu, intervened with his Manipuri troops to restore order and protect the Hindu participants, allowing the Rathajatra procession to proceed without further disruption. According to local tradition, he was thereafter regarded by the Hindu community of Sylhet as a protector of their religious practices. Following his participation in the festival, Singh is credited with introducing the celebration of Rathajatra and the worship of Jagannath to his home kingdom of Manipur.

== See also ==
- List of Manipuri kings
- Manipur (princely state)
- Battle of Talain (1824)
- Liberation of Manipur
- Seven Years Devastation

Preceded by Pitambara Singh	King of Manipur; 1825–1834	Succeeded by Nara Singh
