= Marjit Singh =

- Vassal king of Manipur
- Reign: r. 1812–1819
- Predecessor: Chourjit Singh
- Successor: Bagyidaw (King of Burma)
- Born: Kangleipak
- Died: Balush Ghat, Sylhet
- Dynasty: Ningthouja dynasty
- Father: Bhagya Chandra

Marjit Singh was a king of the Manipur kingdom between 1812 and 1819 as a vassal of Burma but was eventually expelled by the Burmese. The Burmese devastated Manipur during a seven-year occupation that came to be known as Chahi-Taret Khuntakpa.

== Family ==
Marjit Singh was a son of Raja Bhagya Chandra, the ruler up to 1798. Afterwards, his numerous sons fought for the throne.

Madhuchandra succeeded his father at first. He fled to Cachar when the Burmese threatened the kingdom. He tried to regain it with the help of the Cachar king Govinda Chandra. However, he was killed by the troops of his brother, Chourjit Singh. During Chourjit Singh's reign, Marjit Singh fled to Cachar and got into a serious dispute there. Then he went to Burma in 1806 and received the help of King Bodawpaya in 1812. Bodawpaya sent a Burmese force, expelled Chourjit Singh and installed Marjit Singh as a vassal king. Marjit Singh also ceded the Kabaw Valley to Burma in return for the favour.

== Rule ==
Marjit Singh ascended to the throne in 1812. Chourjit Singh, along with another brother Gambhir Singh, fled to Cachar. Govinda Chandra refused to help them against a brother, but Marjit Singh invaded Cachar anyway in 1817. Chourjit and Gambhir Singh helped Govinda Chandra fend off Marjit Singh, but they in turn drove out Govinda Chandra, took over Cachar, and plundered it.

Marjit Singh and his nobles tried to replicate the luxurious habits they learnt at the Burmese court, with splendour in dress and cavalcades, which contrasted with the natural simplicity of Manipur. The people tolerated them only for fear of the Burmese. Marjit Singh is also said to have built a gilded palace, which was only allowed for the Burmese king. In 1819, when Bagyidaw succeeded Bodawpaya, Marjit Singh failed to attend his coronation. Bagyidaw, who had always supported Marjit Singh's entreaties in the past, was irked by the insubordination, and sent troops to reconquer Manipur.

The Burmese drove out Marjit Singh and installed puppet rulers, supported by a permanent garrison stationed in Manipur.

== Exile ==
The Burmese occupation lasted until the First Anglo-Burmese War in 1824, and became locally known as Chahi-Taret Khuntakpa. It devastated Manipur. Accordingto Pemberton, Manipur was 'doomed ... to the devastating visitation of Burmese armie,s which have nine or ten times swept the country from one extremity to the other, with the apparent determination of extirpating a race whom they found it impossible permanently to subdue.'

Marjit Singh went to Cachar and joined his other brothers. The brothers divided Cachar among themselves, with Marjit occupying Hailakandi and Gambhir Singh taking control of South Cachar. Chourjit took shelter in Sylhet.

In 1823, the Burmese invaded Cachar, and Gambhir Singh drove them back. In 1824, the British declared war against the Burmese, and the latter came back to invade Cachar with a force of 10,000 men. By this time the British had agreed to support Gambhir Singh with a force of 500 men and artillery. The combined British and Gambhir Singh forces fought the Burmese and drove them back to Manipur.

The British decided to restore Cachar to Govinda Chandra, and appointed the three brothers to Manipur, with Chourjit Singh as the king, Marjit Singh as the heir apparent, and Gambhir Singh as the general. However, it is said that Chourjit and Marjit did not act, and so, Gambhir Singh was made king. He recovered Manipur from the Burmese and ascended the throne in 1825.

Chourjit and Marjit were allowed to settle in British territory with a monthly allowance of one hundred rupees. Marjit Singh settled in Sylhet, and he died at Balush Ghat, in the south of the district.

== See also ==
- List of Manipuri kings
- Manipur (princely state)

== Bibliography ==
- Banerjee, A. C. (1946) [1943], The Eastern Frontier of British India, 1784–1826 (Second ed.), Calcutta: A. Mukherjee – via archive.org
- Cocks, S. W. (1919), A Short History of Burma, London: McMillan – via archive.org
- Brown, R. (1874), Statistical Account of the Native State of Manipur and the Hill Territory under Its Rule, Calcutta: Office of the Superintendent of Government Printing
- Harvey, G. E. (1925). History of Burma: From the Earliest Times to 10 March 1824. London: Frank Cass & Co. Ltd – via archive.org.
- Hodson, Thomas Callan (1908), The Meitheis, Harvard University – via archive.org
- Thant, Myint-U (2001), The Making of Modern Burma, Cambridge University Press, ISBN 978-0-521-79914-0

Preceded by Chourjit Singh	Vassal king of Manipur; 1812–1819	Succeeded by Shubol
