= Ningthouja dynasty =

Ruling dynasty of Kangleipak (Manipur) Kingdom

House of Ningthouja
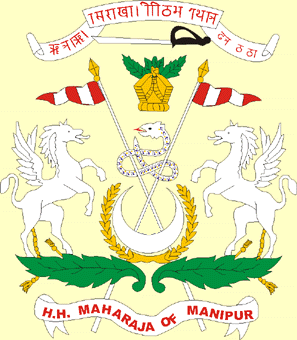
- Royal coat of arms of Manipur
- Country: Manipur
- Founded: 33; 1993 years ago
- Founder: Nongdā Lāiren Pākhangba
- Current head: Leishemba Sanajaoba
- Final ruler: Bodhchandra Singh
- Titles: King of Manipur
- Deposition: 1949 (Merged into the Union of India)

The Ningthouja dynasty, also known as Mangang dynasty, comprises the descendants of the kings of Manipur. Ningthouja literally means progeny of King (Ningthou means king and cha or macha means progeny in which ja is a corrupted word of cha). It has 125 extended families. It was founded by King Nongdā Lāiren Pākhangba in 33 CE.

== History ==
By the beginning of the 1st millennium CE, the Ningthouja Dynasty began to emerge in Imphal River valley, overrunning the territory of the Khaba clan. They established Kangla as their seat of power. From Kangla they absorbed the surrounding clan principalities of Luwang, Moirang, Khaba-Nganba, Angom, Sarang-Leishangthem and Khuman.

Since 33 CE till the rule of the last King Bodhchandra, Manipur was ruled by seventy-four kings, of whom the hallowed reign of Pakhangba, Naothingkhong, Loiyumba, Kiyamba, Khagemba, Charairongba, Pamheiba, Maharaja Jai Singh, Maharaja Gambhir Singh, Maharaja Nara Singh, Chandrakirti and Churchand are outstanding.

== Rulers ==
- Nongdā Lāiren Pākhangba (33–154 CE), founder of dynasty
- Khuiyoi Tompok (154–264 CE)
- Taothingmang (264–364 CE)
- Khui Ningonba (364–379 CE)
- Pengsipa (379–394 CE)
- Kaokhangpa (394–411 CE)
- Naokhampa (411–428 CE)
- Naophangpa (428–518 CE)
- Sameilang (518–568 CE)
- Urakonthoupa (568–658 CE)
- Naothingkhon (663–763 CE)
- Khongtekcha (763–773 CE)
- Keilencha (784–799 CE)
- Yalaba (799–821 CE)
- Ayangpa (821–910 CE)
- Ningthoucheng (910–949 CE)
- Chenglei-Ipan-Lanthapa (949–969 CE)
- Keiphaba Yanglon (969–984 CE)
- Irengba (984–1074 CE), last ruler of dynasty
- Note - the dynasty still continued as Kingdom of Manipur, where Ningthouja dynasty rules.

== Royal houses ==
Since 19th century the ruling family was divided into several royal houses. They are:

1. The House of Nara Singh (descendants of Maharaja Nara Singh (r. 1844-1850 CE). This house is also the successor of the House of Senapatimayum, that descended from Prince Ngoubram Bir Sai, a son of King Pamheiba, and the grandfather of King Nara Singh.
2. The House of Karta (descendants of Maharaja Bhagyachandra (r. 1759-1762 CE, 1763-1798 CE).
3. Mantrimayum (descendants of Prince Ananta Sai).
4. Lourungpurenmayum (descendants of Prince Haricharan Sai).
5. Urungpurenmayum (descendants of Prince Satrughana Sai/Tolon Tomba).

=== Members of the Royal Family of Manipur since 1709 CE ===
The members of the Royal Family of Manipur since 1709 CE include:

- Emperor Pamheiba (r. 1709-1748 CE), popularly known as Garibniwaz, Mayangamba, Gopal Singh
- King Ajit Sai (r. 1748–1752), son of Garibniwaz
- King Bharat Sai (r. 1752–1753), son of Garibniwaz
- Prince Shyam Sai, the Khurai Lakpa, son of Garibniwaz
- Prince Ngaobram Bir Sai, the Senapati, also known as Theer Sai, son of Garibniwaz
- Prince Ananta Sai, son of Garibniwaz
- Prince Haricharan Sai, son of Ningthem Pamheiba
- Jay Jagadananda, the Lourungpuren, Son of Haricharan Sai
- Prince Kokilananda, son of Ananta Sai
- Joy Singh (r. 1822–1823), son of Kokilananda
- King Maramba, also known as Gourshyam (r. 1753–1759, 1762-1763 CE), son of Shyam Sai
- Princess Sheitamala, niece of Garibniwaz, later the Queen of Burma
- Princess Haripriya, daughter of Garibniwaz, later the Queen of Cachar

=== Members of the House of Nara Singh ===
- King Badra Singh (r. 1824–1825), also known as Meetingu Nongpok Wairang Pamheiba, Maharaja Khaba, son of Ngaobram Bir Sai
- King Yadu Singh (r. 1823), son of King Badra Singh
- King Ragav Singh (r. 1823–1824), Son of King Yadu Singh
- King Nara Singh (r. 1844–1850) also known as Chingthanglen Pamheiba, Meetingu Lairen Nongdren Sendreng Manik Khomba, son of King Badra Singh.
- Crown Prince Bubonsana, also known as Bogendra, son of King Nara Singh
- Prince Barachaoba, the Yaiskullakpa (He rose in rebellion against Maharaja Surchandra. He was captured and exiled to Hazaribad.), son of King Nara Singh
- Prince Angou, the Senapati (He rose in rebellion against Maharaja Chandrakirti in 1851. He was defeated and fled to Cachar.), son of King Nara Singh
- Prince Haojao, the Khurailakpa, son of Nara Singh
- Prince Puskar Sana, the Mantri (after the Anglo-British War he was recommended as the new king of Manipur under the British rule. He declined it and recommended his elder brother's youngest grandon son Churchand as the king of Manipur.), son of King Nara Singh
- Prince Udendra also known as Sana Uriba, son of King Nara Singh
- Prince Megazing, son of King Nara Singh
- Prince Theba, son of King Nara Singh
- Prince Bekendra, the Sangol Senba Hanjaba
- Prince Keipha Sana or Keifa Singh, son of King Nara Singh (Keifa Singh introduced the modern polo game to the British in his exile to Hazaribad in 1862).
- Princess Konusana, daughter of King Nara Singh
- Princess Chaobiton, daughter of King Nara Singh
- Princess Sana Pukhrambi
- Princess Yumsangbi, daughter of King Nara Singh
- Princess Thokchom Ongbi, daughter of King Nara Singh
- Princess Nongthonbi Sana, daughter of King Nara Singh
- Princess Chaonu Sana, daughter of King Nara Singh
- King Devendra Sing (r. 1850), also known as Maharaj Dhaka Taba, son of King Badra Singh
- Princess Dhaka Rani, daughter of King Devendra Singh, later the Queen of Tripura
- Prince Thangkok Sana, son of King Devendra Singh (he was exiled for taking part in the uprising of 1904. He later became a Member of Darbar)
- Prince Dumbra Singh, also known as Chaobiyaima, son of Bogendra
- Dumbra Singh, son of Chaobiyaima and elder brother of King Churchand ( He was given the title of "Raja" by the British Govt. for his service to the state)
- Maharaja Sir Chura Chand Singh (r. 1891–1941) (He died at Nabadwip, West Bengal), son of Chaobiyaima
- Prince Priya Brata Singh, the first and last Chief Minister of independent Manipur, son of Maharaja Chura Chand Singh.
- Princess Tamphasana, daughter of Maharaja Chura Chand Singh
- Princess Tombisana, daughter of Maharaja Chura Chand Singh
- Prince Jai Singh
- Prince Khedasana, son of Maharaja Chura Chand Singh
- Prince Maipaksana, son of Prince Sanahal, also known as Aminsana
- Princess Sanatombi, daughter of Maharaja Sur Chandra
- Princess Binodini, popularly known as M. K. Binodini Devi, daughter of Maharaja Chura Chand Singh. She was a novelist, short stories writer, film maker and social activist.
- Maharaja Bodh Chandra (r. 1941–1955), son of Maharaja Chura Chand Singh
- Princess Tamphasana
- Maharaja Okendra Singh, son of Maharaja Bodh Chandra
- Maharajkumar Lakshmikant Singh, son of Maharaja Bodhachandra

=== Members of the House of Karta ===
- Maharaja Bhayachandra, popularly known as Chingthang Khomba (r. 1759–1762, 1763–1798), son of Shyam Sai
- King Labyanachandra (r. 1798–1801), son of Bhayachandra
- King Madhuchandra (r. 1801–1803), son of Bhayachandra
- King Chourjit (r. 1803–1813) (He died at Nabadwip, West Bengal), son of Bhayachandra
- Prince Sana Chahi Ahum (popularly known as Rajkumar Norendra Singh, son of Maharaja Chourjit. He raised banner of rebellion against the British in North East India in 1857).
- King Marjit (r. 1813–1819), son of Bhayachandra
- Prince Herachandra, popularly known as Daku Ningthou, son of King Labyanachandra (He was the first leader who mobilized the Meiteis against the Burmese occupation forces in 1819–1821)
- King Yumjaotaba, also known as Pitamber (r. 1821–1822), son of King Madhuchandra
- King Gambhir Singh (He, accompanied by his second cousin Nara Singh drove out the Burmese occupation forces beyond Chinwin River in 1825. By the Treaty of Yandaboo he was declared as the independent ruler of Manipur, 1826–1834), son of Bhayachandra
- Princess Kuranganayani, daughter of Bhayachandra, later the Queen of Assam.
- Princess Tamphasana (Chingakham Ongbi) (today's Moirangkhom market was the dowry of the princess)
- King Chandra Kirti (r. 1834–1844, 1850–1886), son of Gambhir Singh
- Princess Phandengsana (she was a daughter of King Chandra Kirti. She lived at Thangmeiband and later at Nabadwip, Nadia, West Bengal)
- King Surchandra (r. 1886–1890) (He died in Calcutta), son of Chandra Kirti
- Prince Lukhoisana, the son of King Surchandra (He died young after the Anglo Manipur War).
- Rajkumari Sanatombi, daughter of King Surchandra (She became the second wife of Major Maxwell, British political Agent in Manipur and the Regent to the young Raja Churchand. she was popularly known as Bor Sahib ongbi Sanatombi)
- King Kulachadra (r. 1890–1891) (He was exiled to Andaman Island and later settled down until his death at Radhakunda, U.P, India), son of King Chandra Kirti
- Crown-Prince Tikendrajit, also known as Koireng the Senapati (He was hanged by the British in 1891 for waging war against the Queen of the United Kingdom), son of King Chandra Kirti
- Prince Paka Sana, the Sagol Hanjaba, also known as Bheirajit Singh, son of King Chandra Kirti
- Prince Thambou Sana, the Samu Hanjaba, also known as Kishorjit Singh, son of King Chandra Kirti
- Prince Gopal Sana, the Phunganai Hanjaba, son of King Chandra Kirti
- Prince Zilla Ngamba, son of King Chandra Kirti
- Prince Angou Sana, son of King Chandra Kirti
- Rajkumar Bikramjit Singh (Indian flautist)

== Royal titles ==
The royal titles of Meitei princes are:

1. Wangam for male members of the Ningthouja Dynasty.
2. Meidingu for king.
3. Ningthem for king.
4. Wangol Ningthou for crown prince.
5. Ningthemcha, Ibungshija, Ibungo, Ningthoumacha for princes.
6. Sanawapihal or Sanahal for the eldest son of the reigning king.

The royal titles for Meitei princesses are:

1. Wangamlon for the daughters of the Ningthouja Dynasty.
2. Meetei Leima for head queen.
3. Apambi Ahal for second queen.
4. Leimakhubi Ahal for third queen.
5. Apambi Naha for fourth queen.
6. Shija and Ebemma for the princesses and wives of the princes.
7. Tampha Wangamlon or Tamphasana for the eldest daughter of the reigning king.

Since the adoption of Hinduism in the 18th century the royal family of Manipur styled Hindu titles:

1. Maharaja, Shrijut, Manipureswar, Mekleswar for king.
2. Yuvaraj for crown prince.
3. Rajkumar for princes.
4. Rajkumari for princesses.

During the reigns of Maharaja Churchand Singh (1891–1941) and Maharaja Bodhchandra Singh (1941–1955) their sons and daughters were given the high-sounding titles such as Maharaj Kumar and Maharaj Kumari. On the inherent title and privilege of the princes Major Maxwell, the then British Political Agent in Manipur and the regent of the young Raja Churchand Singh writes:"Rajkumars, or as they are called in Manipur Ninthou Machas, a Rajas, are very numerous; if, for instance, a Raja had eight sons and these sons were equally well blessed with male issue, the whole 64 grandsons would be Ningthou Machas, and their sons again, and so on." Rajkumars were a troublesome people, Major Maxwell observed and he gave them little encouragement.

== Notable works about Manipur royalty ==
=== Films about Manipur royalty ===
- Coronation of the Maharaja of Manipur (1944, 7 min, 35 mm)
- The Maharajah Dancer (1945)
- Raj Nartaki (1941)

=== Books on the kings of Manipur ===
- L. Ibungohal Singh and N. Khelchandra, Cheitharol Kumbaba (Imphal: Manipur sahitya Parisad)
- Saroj Nalini Arambam Parratt, The Court Chronicle of the kings of Manipur (London, 2005).
- Raj Kumar Somorjit Sana, The Chronology of Meetei Monarchs (From 1666 CE to 1850 CE)(Imphal: W. Ananda Meetei, 2010)
- L. Joychandra, The Lost Kingdom (Imphal, 2005)
- Gangmumei Kamei, A History of Modern Manipur 1826-2000 (New Delhi: Akansha Publishing).

== See also ==
- List of Manipuri kings
- Khuman Salai Dynasty
- Ahom dynasty
- Toungoo dynasty
