= Leichillon =

Ancient Meitei study for clouds

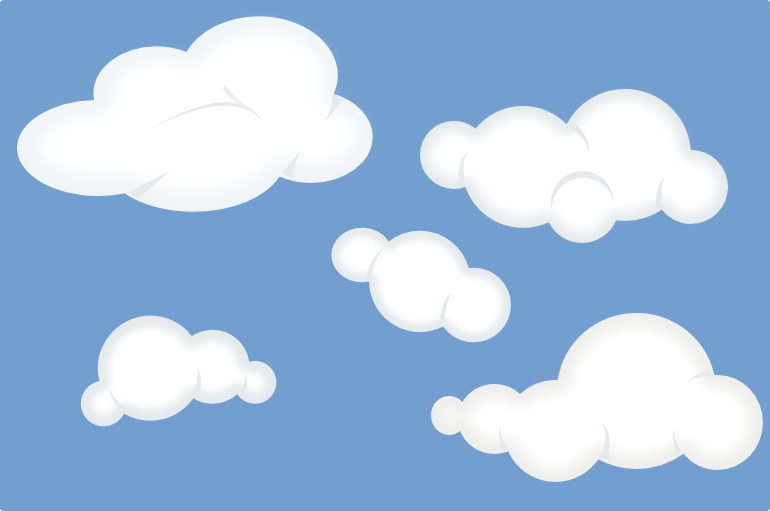
Illustration of some clouds in the sky

Leichillon Kanglon Yengba (ꯂꯩꯆꯤꯜꯂꯣꯟ ꯀꯥꯡꯂꯣꯟ ꯌꯦꯡꯕ), shortly known as Leichillon (ꯂꯩꯆꯤꯜꯂꯣꯟ), or Leichilon (ꯂꯩꯆꯤꯂꯣꯟ), or Leichinlon (ꯂꯩꯆꯤꯟꯂꯣꯟ), is an ancient method of cloud divination practiced by the Meitei people of Manipur, in northeastern India. This traditional form of fortune-telling was used to predict the outcome of important events, especially during times of war, in Meitei civilization. The term can be roughly translated to mean “observing the sky for signs through clouds.”

In the past, it had strong relations with the Meitei martial art form of Thang Ta.

There exists an ancient Meitei language manuscript known as Leichillon, which serves as a detailed treatise on the practice of cloud divination. The text describes various symbolic cloud formations—such as those resembling lions (nongsa/nongsha), pythons (lairen/lairel), and other figures—that were interpreted as omens, particularly in times of war. It emphasizes observing whether the figure appears with a head (makok yaoba) or headless (makok yaodaba), as this distinction determines whether the omen is favorable or unfavorable during wartime.

Leichin (ꯂꯩꯆꯤꯟ) or Leichil (ꯂꯩꯆꯤꯜ) is a Meitei language term for cloud.

== Overview ==
In Meitei culture, cloud observation was an important part of planning for battle. Before setting out on a military campaign, Meitei warriors and leaders would look at the clouds in the sky to find omens or signs. These signs were believed to give information about the success or failure of an upcoming war. Based on the interpretation of these cloud shapes, the army would either proceed with the attack or retreat to avoid disaster, in ancient Kangleipak (early Manipur).

This form of divination was highly respected, and those who led armies were expected to understand it well. A mistake in reading the signs could lead to great loss, while accurate interpretation could lead to victory. This practice combined spiritual belief with strategic decision-making.

== Methods and interpretations ==
There were specific shapes and forms that warriors were trained to recognize in the clouds. These shapes were interpreted as good or bad omens, depending on how and where they appeared in the sky. Some commonly recorded interpretations include:

- Cloud in the shape of a man with a hanging neck (near own camp): This was seen as a very bad omen. If this type of cloud appeared over the army’s own camp, it meant defeat or danger was near. The army was advised to retreat immediately.
- Same shape in enemy territory: If the cloud with a hanging neck appeared over the enemy's camp, it was seen as a positive sign. It meant that the enemy would face defeat. In this case, the army was encouraged to advance quickly, as victory was likely.
- Cloud shaped like a fully armed warrior: This was another inauspicious sign. If a cloud looked like a soldier wearing full battle gear and holding various weapons, it meant that the army could suffer heavy casualties. The advice was to flee the battlefield and avoid confrontation.
- Cloud shaped like a broken flag or fluttering pennon: This was also considered a bad omen. A flag or banner that appeared broken or loose in the clouds suggested disorder on the battlefield. It meant that the battle would be chaotic, and things would not go according to plan.

== Cultural importance ==
Leichillon Kanglon Yengba is one of several methods used by the Meiteis for making predictions or seeking divine guidance. Other forms of traditional augury included studying animal behavior, interpreting dreams, or examining natural phenomena.

Although modern warfare no longer depends on such practices, the method of cloud divination holds historical and cultural significance. It reflects the Meitei people's deep connection with nature, spirituality, and the cosmos.

In modern times, Leichillon Kanglon Yengba remains a part of Meitei folklore and traditional knowledge, often studied by scholars of traditional Meitei religion and ancient military customs.

== See also ==
- Meitei astronomy
- Animals in Meitei culture
- Meitei Lanmi
  - Khong Lanmi
  - Sagol Lanmi
  - Hee Lanmi
- Shamu (Meitei culture)
- Meitei confederacy
- Meitei martial arts
  - Thang Ta
  - Sarit Sarak
  - Cheibi
- Meitei traditional weapons
- Meitei traditional toys
- Meitei traditional games
- Meitei royal etiquette
- Ahom–Meitei relations
  - Meitei people in Assam
- Burmese–Meitei relations
  - Seven Years' Devastation (Chahi Taret Khuntakpa)
  - Meitei people in Myanmar
  - Meitei–Shan relations
- Takhel Ngamba
  - Meitei people in Tripura
- Meitei people in Bangladesh
