= Lanmi (Meitei culture) =

Meitei traditional military system

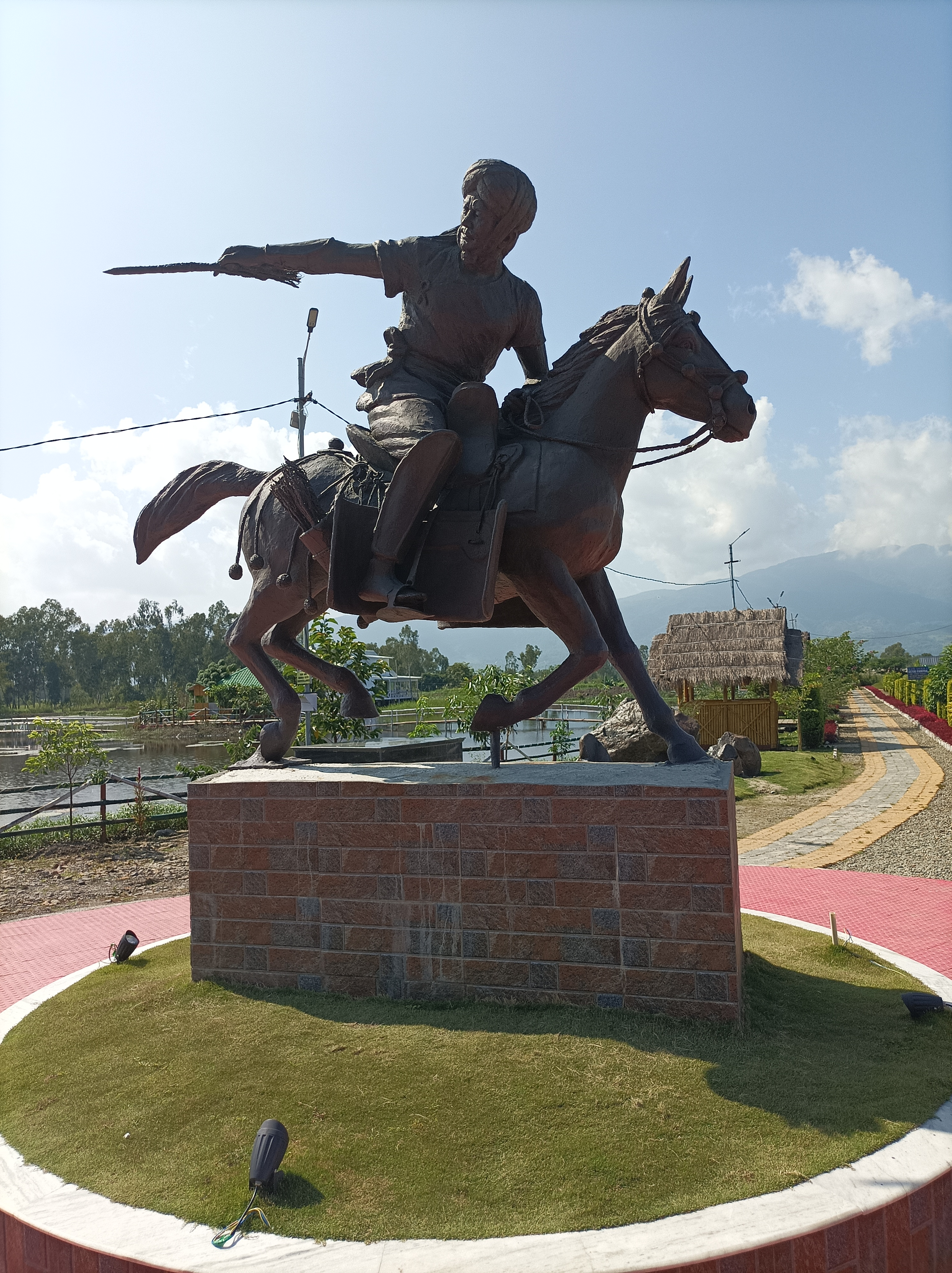
A Classical Meitei sculpture of an ancient Meitei cavalry soldier, trying to throw an Arambai weapon backwards (traditionally towards the pursuing enemies), while riding on a galloping Meitei horse (Manipuri pony)

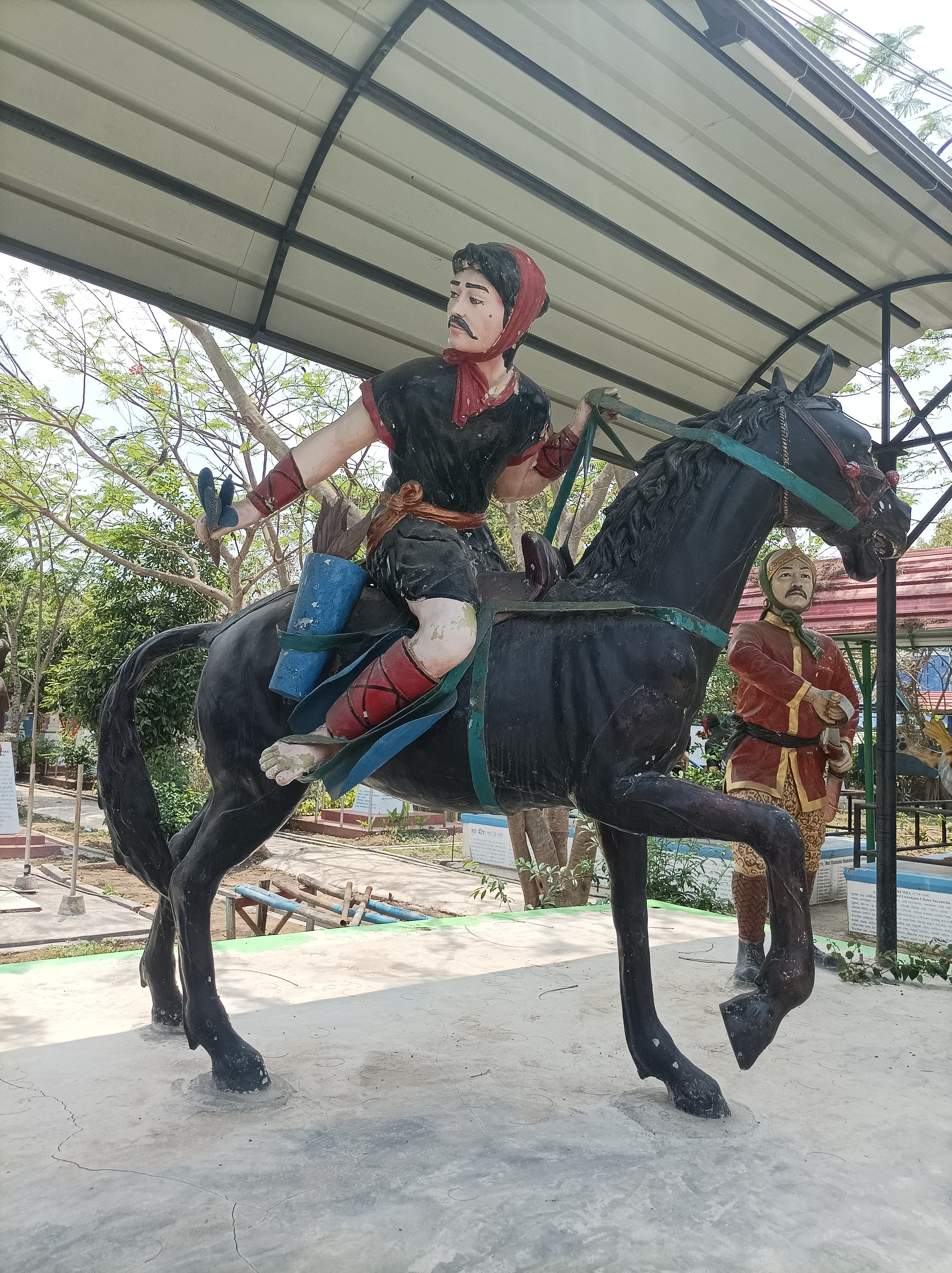
Sculptures of Meitei prince Daku Ningthou Sana Herachandra, riding a Meitei horse and holding an Arambai poisoned dart-like weapon, and King Nara Singh (standing)

Lanmi (ꯂꯥꯟꯃꯤ), also spelled as Lanmee, refers to the traditional warrior class in Ancient Kangleipak, the early realm of modern day Manipur, a region in northeast India with a long and established martial history. The term Lanmi translates to "man of war" or "warrior" in the Meitei language. The institution of Lanmi played a central role in Manipur’s military system and cultural heritage, especially during its time as an independent kingdom before its integration into Republic of India.

== Historical background ==
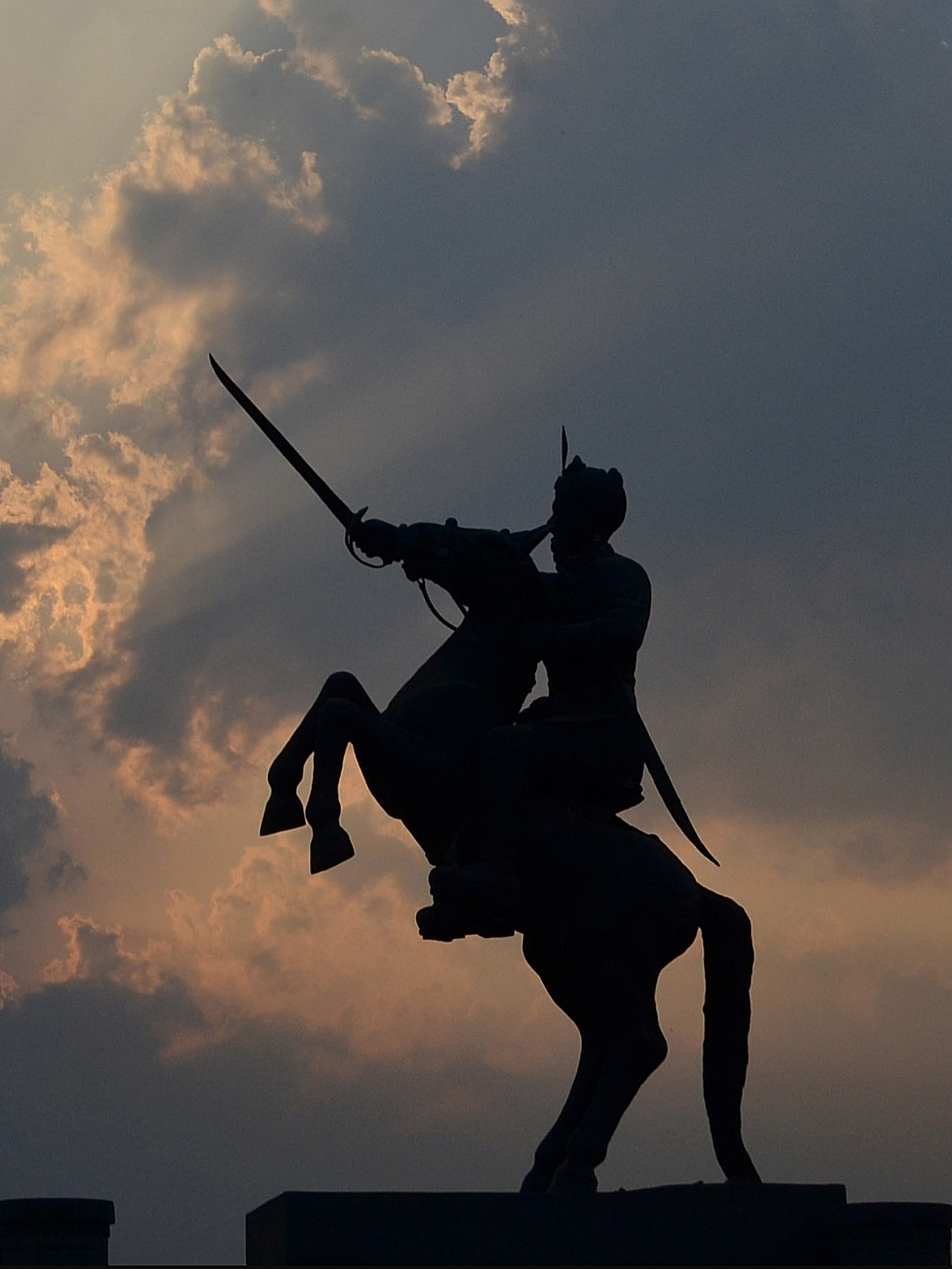
A classical Meitei sculpture of King Gambhir Singh

Manipur was historically an independent kingdom ruled by Meitei monarchs. Its strategic location and frequent conflicts made it necessary for the kingdom to develop a strong and well-organized military force. The foundation of the Lanmi system coincided with the establishment of a centralized administrative structure, notably during the reign of King Meidingu Punshiba (1404–1432).

The military department created under Punshiba was called Shingchep Meira Haijouroi (Torch Swingers). The Lanmis served the king during royal processions and also took part in battles. They carried traditional arms such as swords, spears, and shields and also had ceremonial roles during peace times.

== Roles and duties ==
In times of war, Lanmis fought as skilled warriors. During peace, they took on various roles including:

- Crafting bamboo items and constructing buildings
- Organizing and clearing sites for rituals
- Attending royal animals like elephants and horses
- Guarding criminals and convicts
- Catching specific birds and animals for ceremonial purposes

It was customary that husbands of the king’s daughters were not allowed to join the Lanmi ranks. Lanmis also participated in specialized rituals and festivals, including Ayang Chatpa, which involved religious offerings and taboos.

== Military organization ==
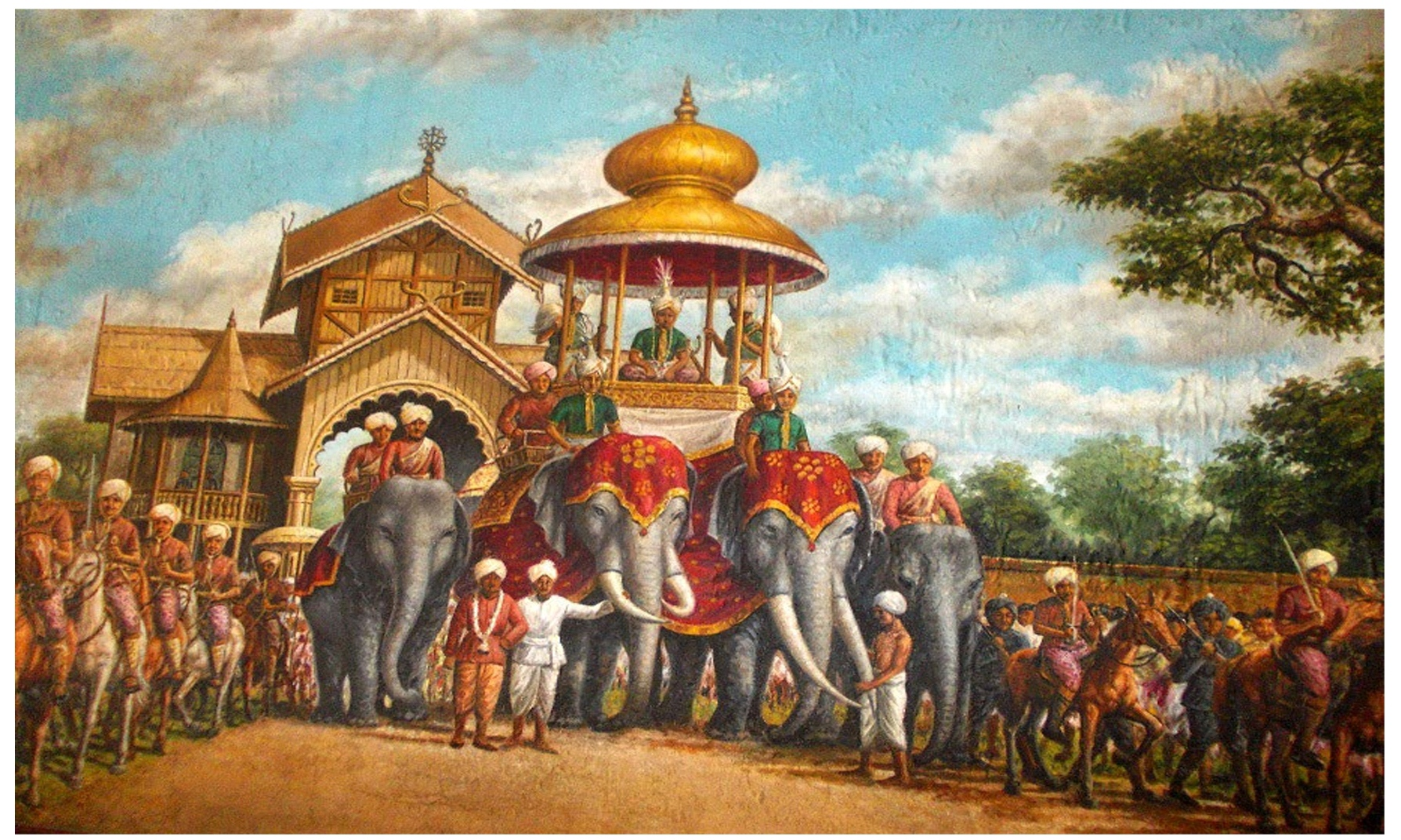
Depiction of royal horsemen guarding a Meitei king, being carried on a howdah, by the imperial elephants

The Meitei army, including the infantry, was organized using a decimal system, similar to that of the Mughals. The basic unit was a regiment of 1,000 soldiers, originally called a fauji or doli, later known as a tuli. The entire army was made up of 13 tulis, each with its own name and command.

Each Tuli was divided into several Lups (companies). A Tuli usually had 7 to 17 companies. Each Lup was led by a Lakpa, and below him were various officers including Hidang Hanjaba, Thangsuhanba, Thangsunaha, Tenshuhanba, Tenshunaha, and Meiraba. During the British period, ranks like Captain, Subedar, and Jamadar were also used. The commander of a Tuli was called Lallup Chingba or Tulinaha Major.

=== Under King Garibaniwaj (1709–1748) ===
The military of Manipur reached its peak during King Garibaniwaj’s rule. He established a formal military structure with three main branches:

==== Infantry ====
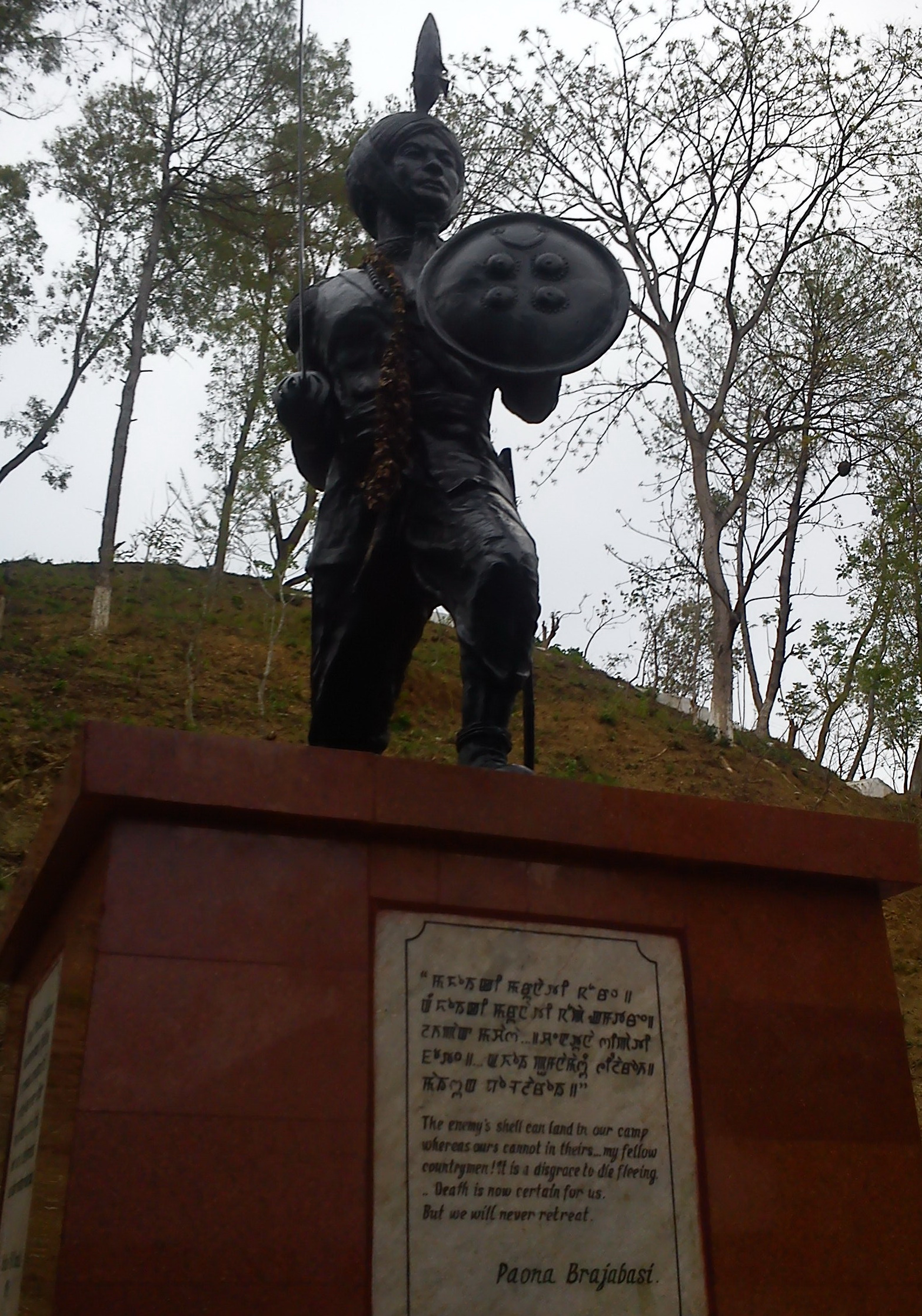
A statue of Paona Brajabashi, a warrior leader in the Meitei infantry

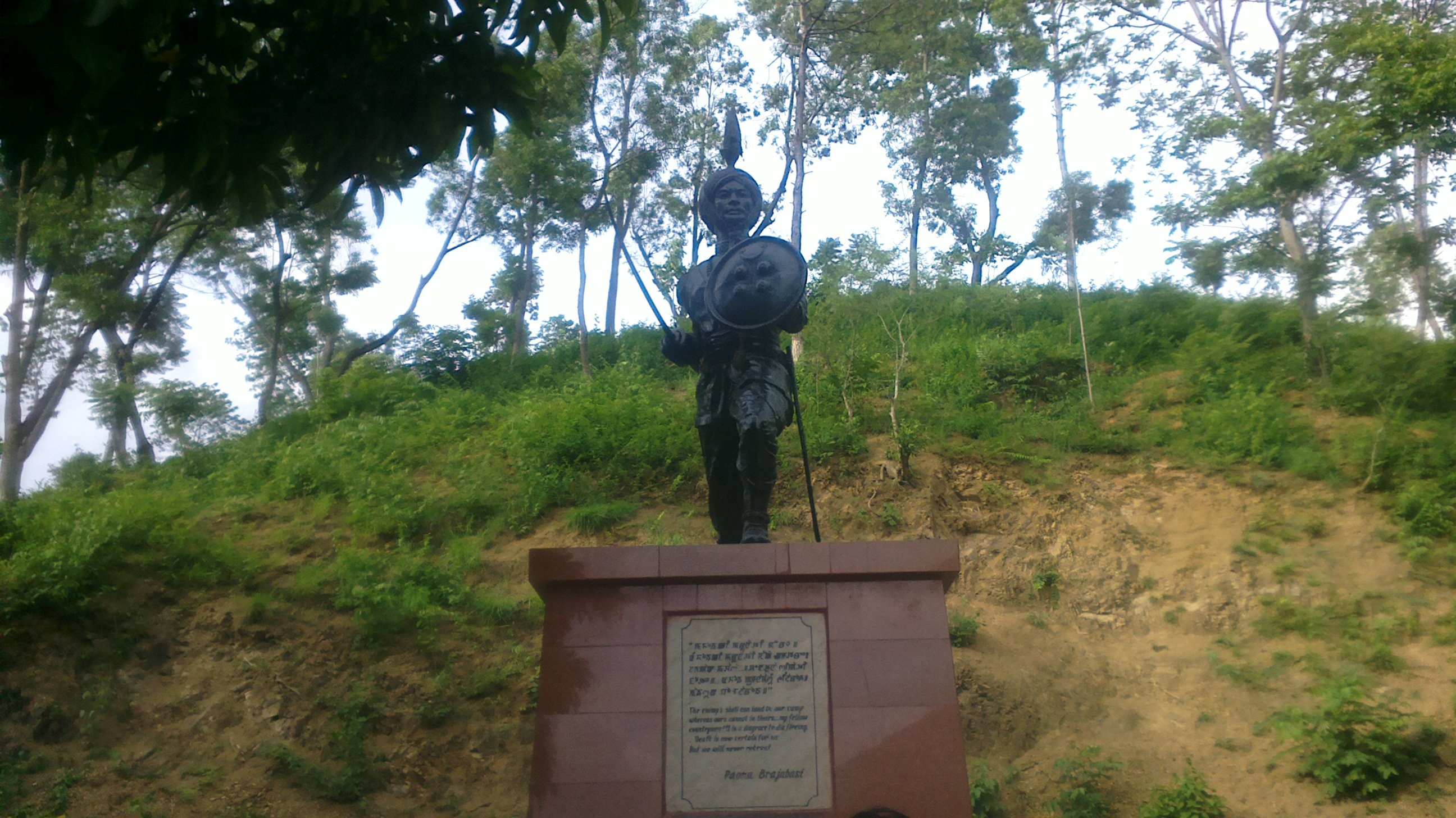
A statue of Paona Brajabashi, a warrior leader in the Meitei infantry

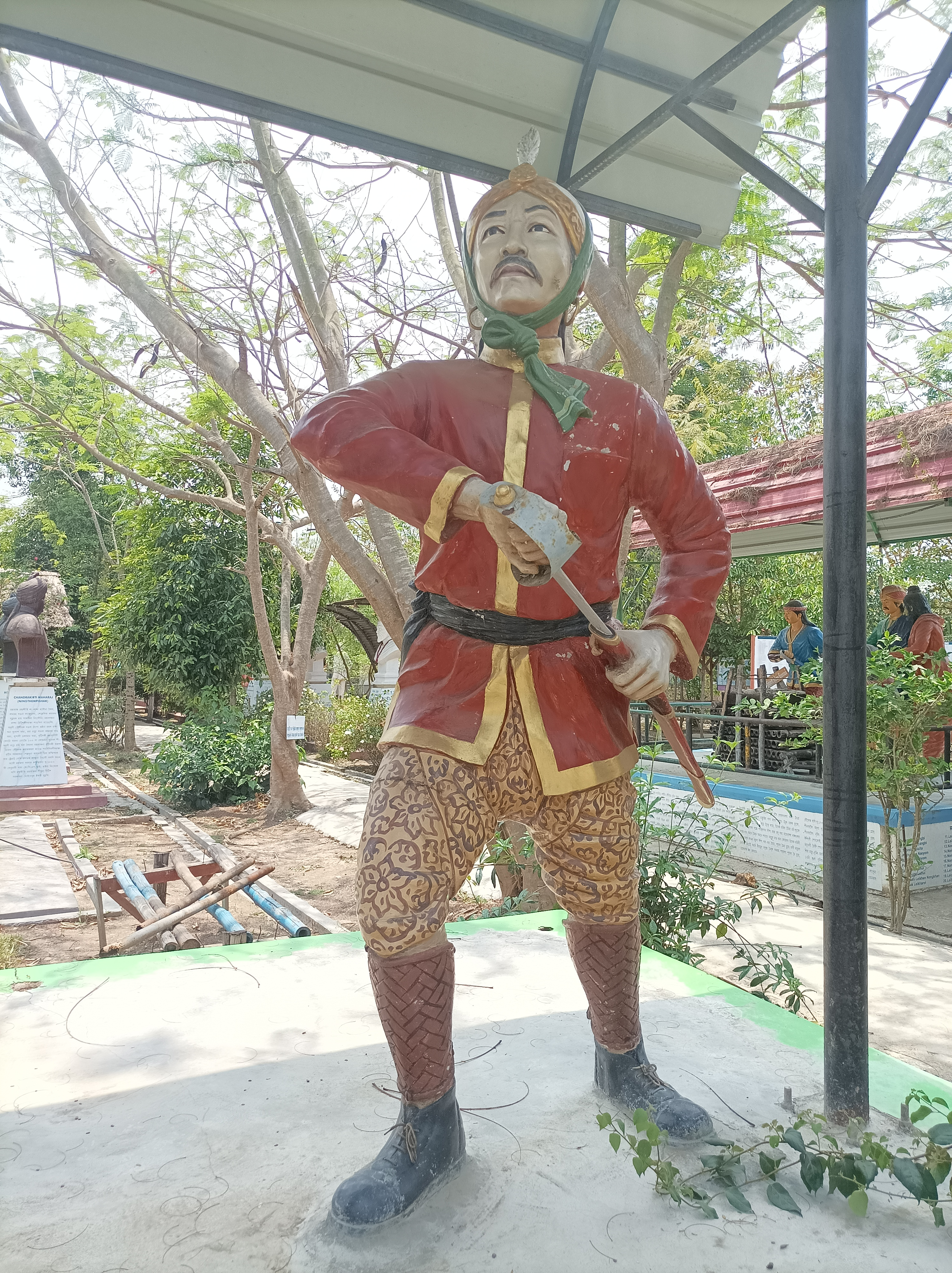
Sculpture of Meitei king Meidingu Nara Singh, the Maharaja of Kangleipak (Manipur Kingdom)

Khong Lanmi (ꯈꯣꯡ ꯂꯥꯟꯃꯤ), (Note: also spelled as Khong Lanmee) also known as Khongmi Lanmi (ꯈꯣꯡꯃꯤ ꯂꯥꯟꯃꯤ), (Note: also spelled as Khongmee Lanmee) refers to the infantry or foot soldiers of the Meitei traditional army. It was one of the three main divisions of the military, along with Sagol Lanmi (cavalry or horsemen) and Hi Lanmi (naval or boat army).

The Khong Lanmi were the most numerous and important branch of the Meitei military forces. These infantry soldiers were trained to engage in direct hand-to-hand combat and often faced enemies fearlessly, sometimes fighting against several opponents at once.

The Khong Lanmi were recruited through the Lallup system, a type of compulsory military service. All able-bodied Meitei males aged 17 or 18 to 60 years were trained as soldiers. They had to serve the state for 10 days out of every 40 days, ensuring the kingdom had a constant supply of well-trained troops.

The infantry used both traditional and modern weapons, especially in different historical periods. Common weapons included:

- Thang (sword)
- Ta (spear)
- Langshoi (club or blunt weapon)
- Tapak (broad-tipped spear)
- Oblong shields
- Shingjang (axe)
- Naori (sling)

From the late 16th century, firearms began to be used. King Mungyamba brought guns from Khamral (Burma or China) in 1584 C.E. Later, King Khagemba used guns against enemies in Cachar kingdom and Tripura kingdom. In Pamheiba’s reign (1709–1748), bell metal cannons called Sen Kamran were used. By 1825, Raja Gambhir Singh received 1,500 muskets from the British, indicating further modernization of the army.

At various points in history, the infantry had a significant strength:

- King Garibaniwaj had 13,000 well-equipped foot soldiers and an additional 7,000 auxiliary troops.
- The Manipuri army had a total of 13 regiments (Tulis), each with about 1,000 soldiers.

The thirteen regiments of Khong Lanmi included: 1. Tulihal 2. Tuliyaima 3. Tulinaha 4. Bhitna Tuli 5. Vishnu Senahal Tuli 6. Vishnu Naha Tuli 7. Top Tuli 8. Loya Tuli 9. Kang Tuli 10. Kangnao Tuli 11. Oinamlong Tuli 12. Naya Tuli 13. Bamdiyar Tuli

The Khong Lanmi were not just a military force but also an integral part of Meitei society. The Lallup system tied military duty to citizenship, ensuring that military service was both a responsibility and a rite of passage for all Meitei men.

==== Cavalry ====
Sagol Lanmi (Cavalry):

- Elite horsemen, known for their agility and combat skills
- Famous for using the Arambai (dart-like weapon)
- Wore specific uniforms including kokyets (turbans), Lanphi (war cloth), and greaves
- Used in major battles against external enemies like the Awa (Burmese)

==== Navy ====
Hi Lanmi (Boat Army):

- Used boats for warfare in marshy terrains and rivers
- Conducted operations on the Ningthi River and Barak River
- Boat races (Hiyang Tannaba) were held annually as both training and entertainment

== Departments related to military production ==
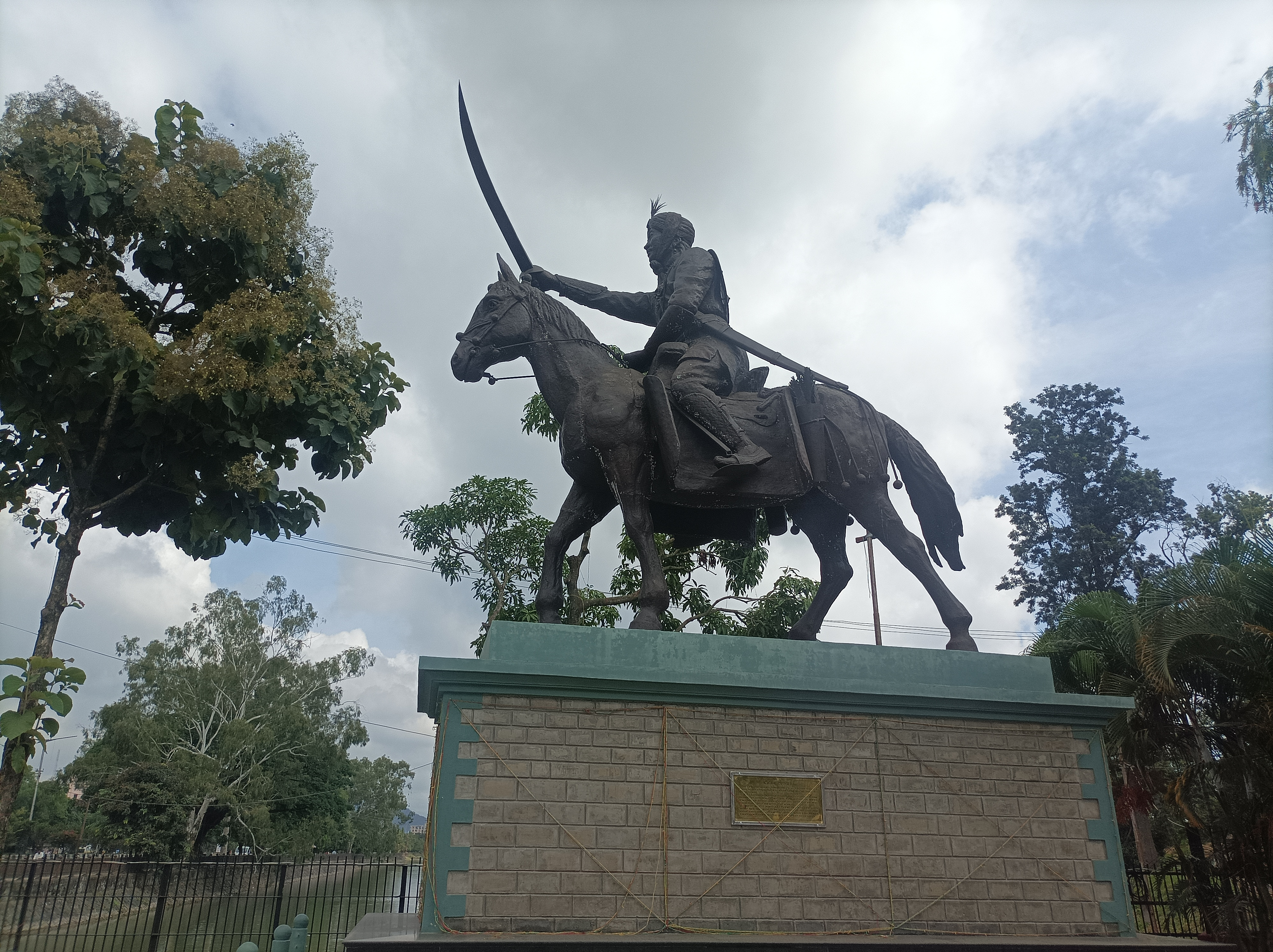
Statue of Meitei king Meidingu Nara Singh, the Maharajah of Kangleipak

Several departments existed to support the military, each with specialized roles:

- Khut-heiba: Made bows, arrows, and ceremonial flags
- Thangsa Hanba: Produced spear handles, shields, and iron parts
- Thangsaba: Worked as blacksmiths, making swords and other weapons
- Arambai-making teams: Involved leather workers, cane workers, and archers

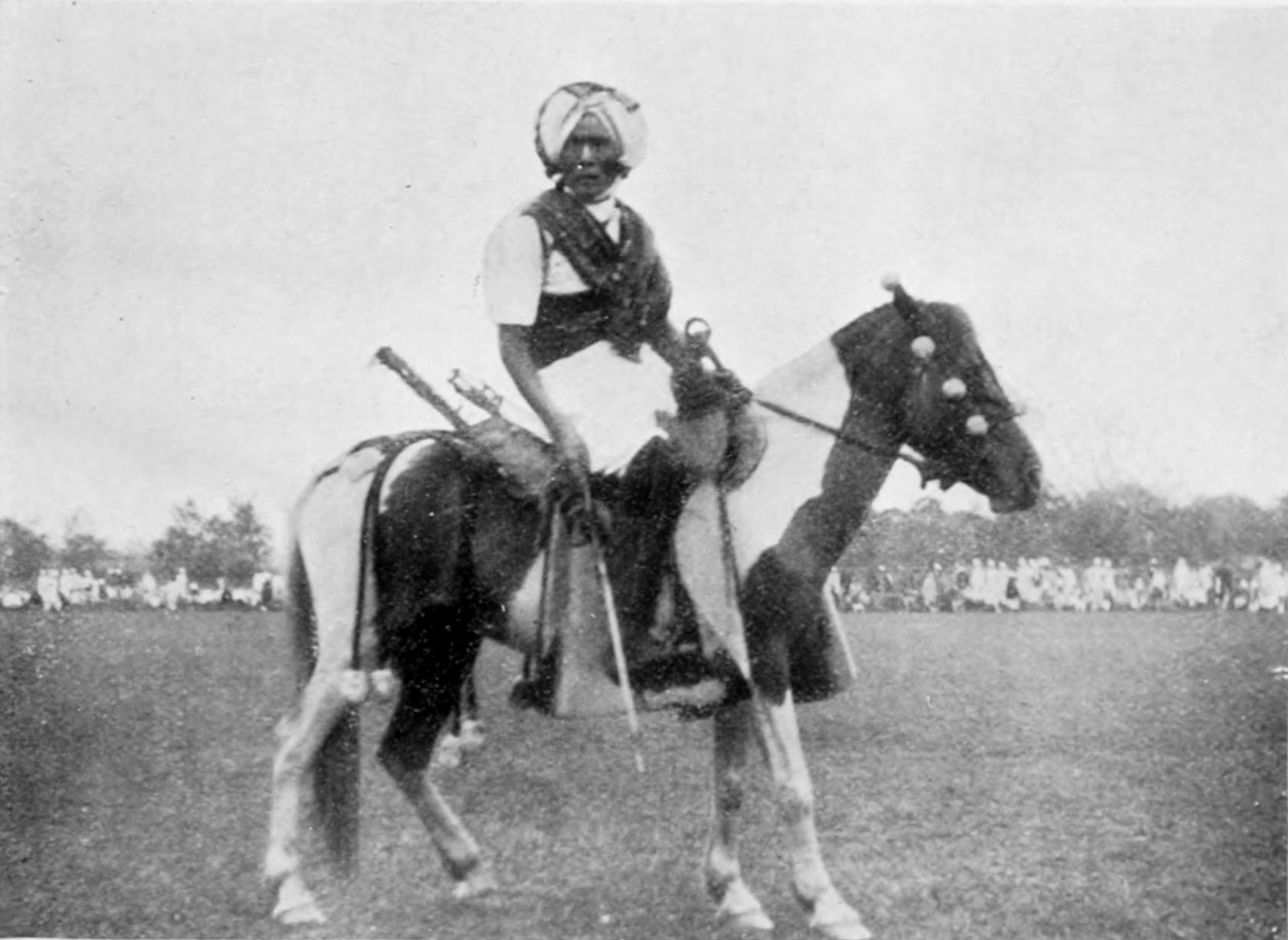
A Meitei warrior carrying the lethal Arambai weapons

== Rituals connected to war and hunting ==
Traditional Meitei culture integrated rituals into military life to maintain spiritual balance and honor:

- Yenbum Huiroi Chanba: For absolving sins from improper kills
- Lanchak Thakpa: Performed by descendants to cleanse ancestors’ war sins
- Nungoibi Lallu Chanba: Offering skulls to a female deity after war
- Lanmi Yanba: Ritual "defeat" of the enemy’s commander before actual battle
- Keiyang Thekpa: Ritual after capturing a tiger
- Lanbao Tamba: Reporting war success to state deities
- Thenggou: Spear dance performed by heroes and generals for success
- Ougri: Sacred chant used for blessing the kingdom or cursing enemies

== Military rewards and honors ==
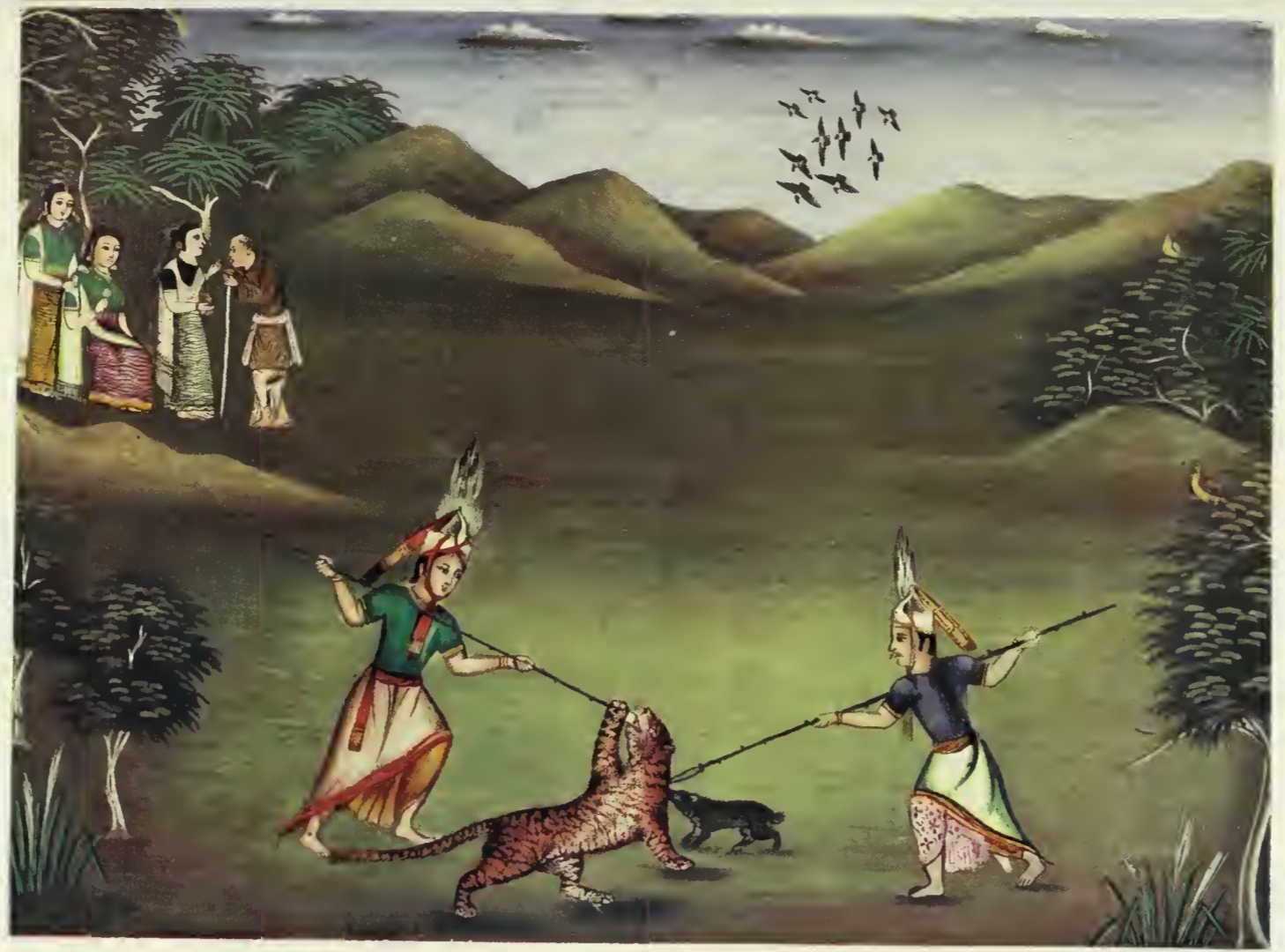
Warriors trying to capture or kill a tiger

Manipur had a structured reward system for warriors and hunters:

- For capturing enemies in war:
  - Honors ranged from shirts of honor to being gifted a royal wife
  - Highest honor was Thangballoi, signifying the capture of 100 enemies or animals
- For capturing animals:
  - Rewards included land, salt, ceremonial items, and sometimes royal honors

== Martial omens and predictions ==
Before going to war, ancient Meiteis practiced various forms of divination:

1. Leichillon Kanglon Yengba: Observing cloud shapes for omens

2. Shaya Miren Yengba: Examining one's shadow or reflection to predict fate in battle

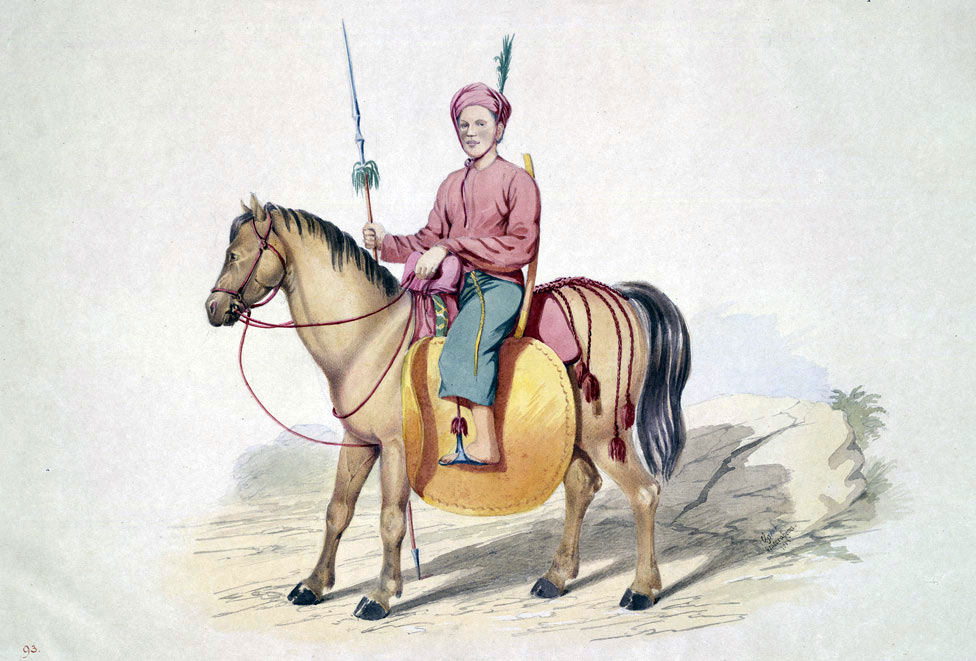
A Meitei horseman in Myanmar

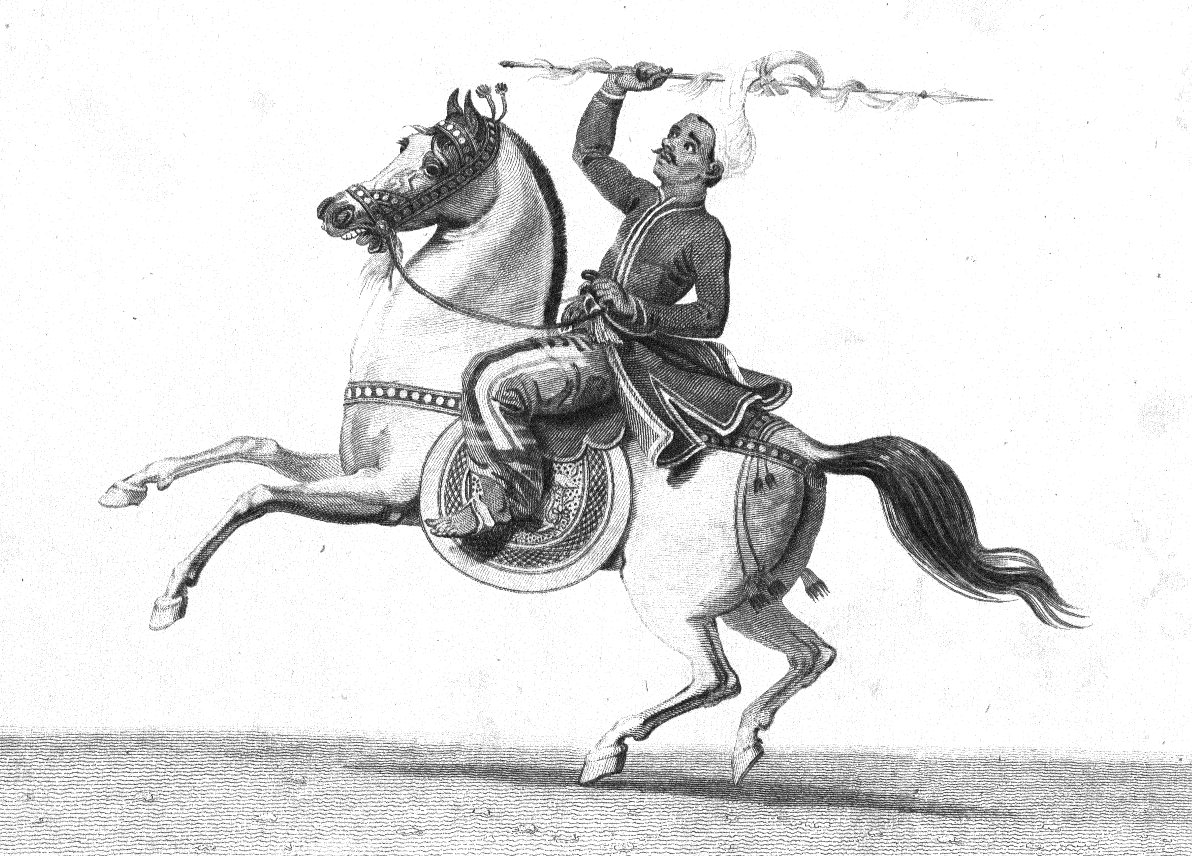
A Meitei horse riding warrior in Myanmar

== Gallery ==

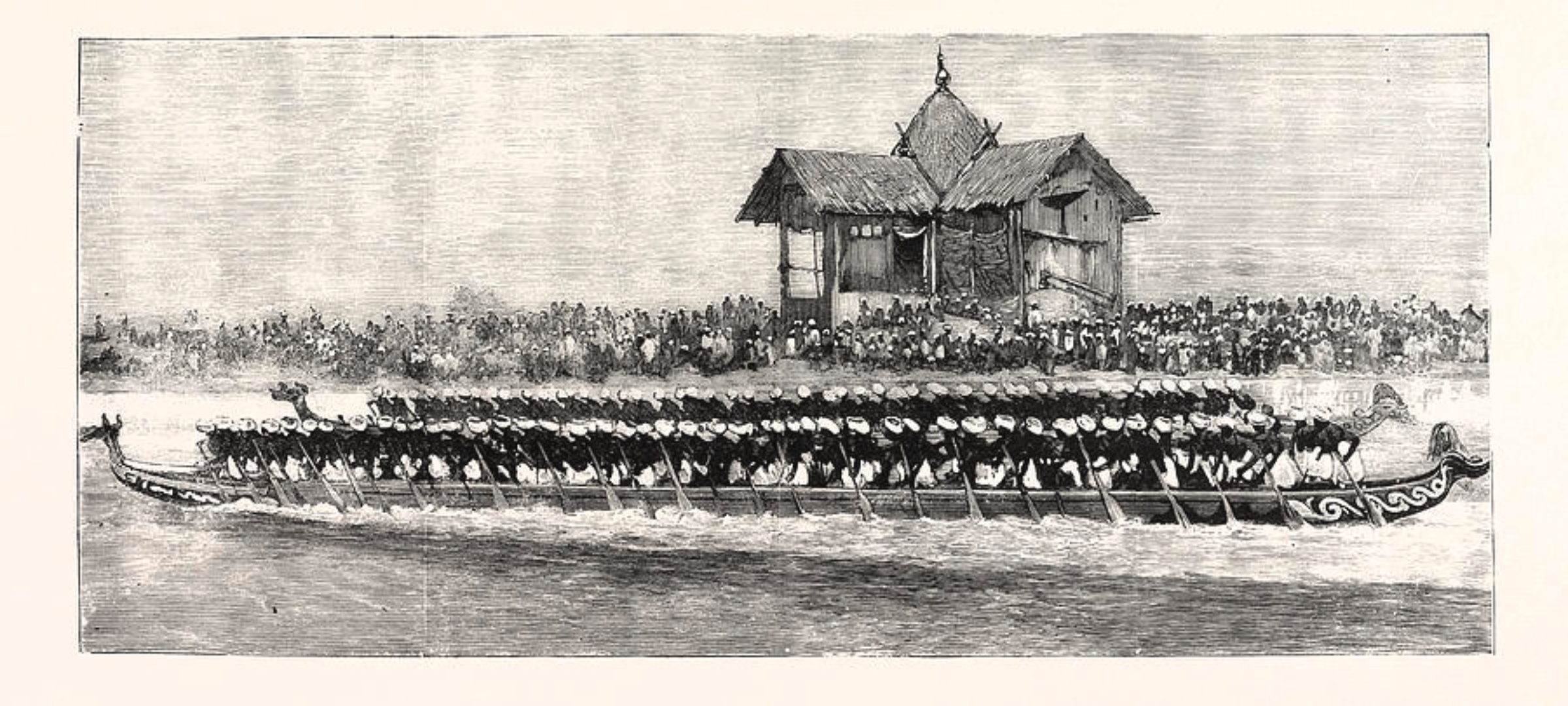

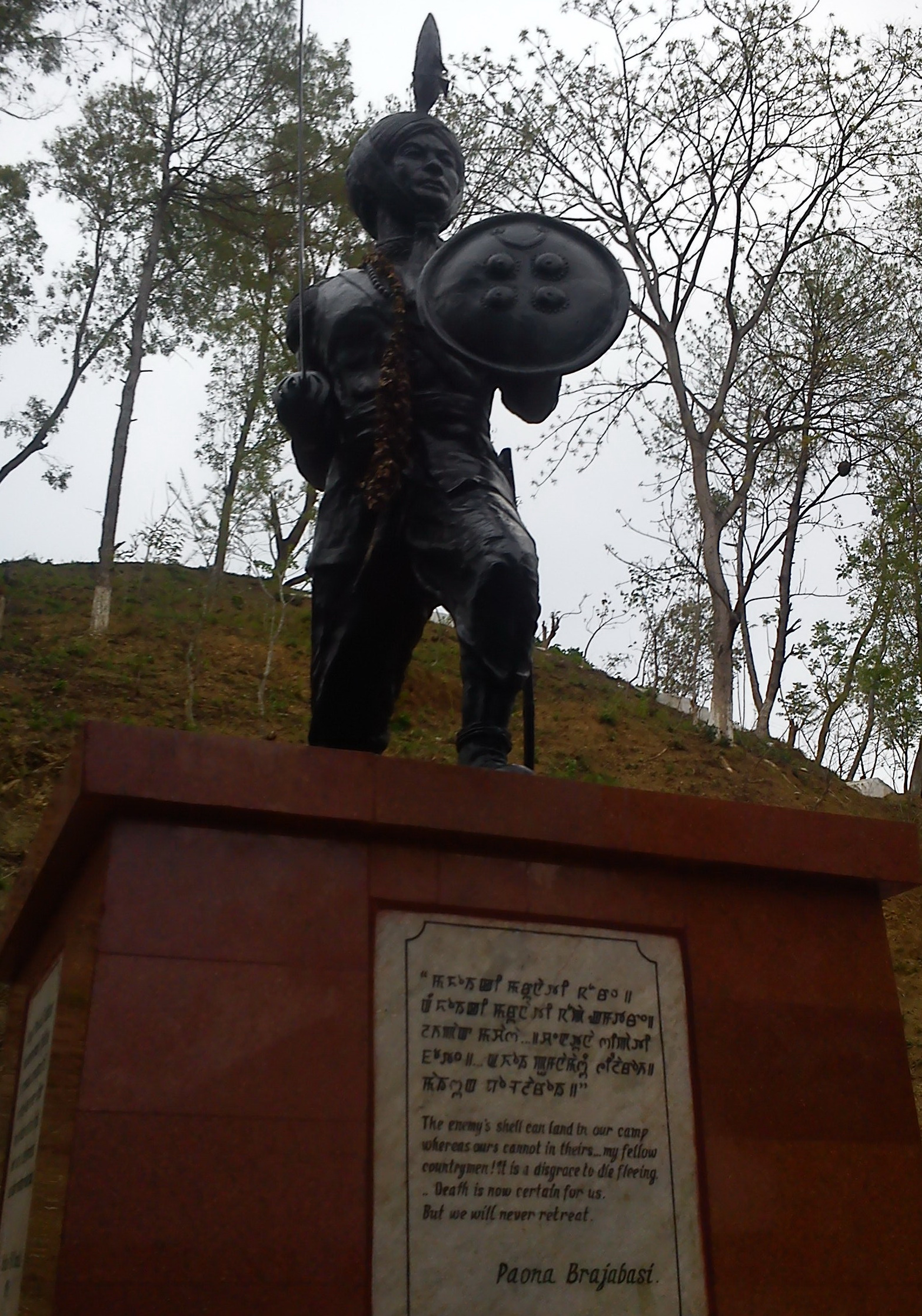

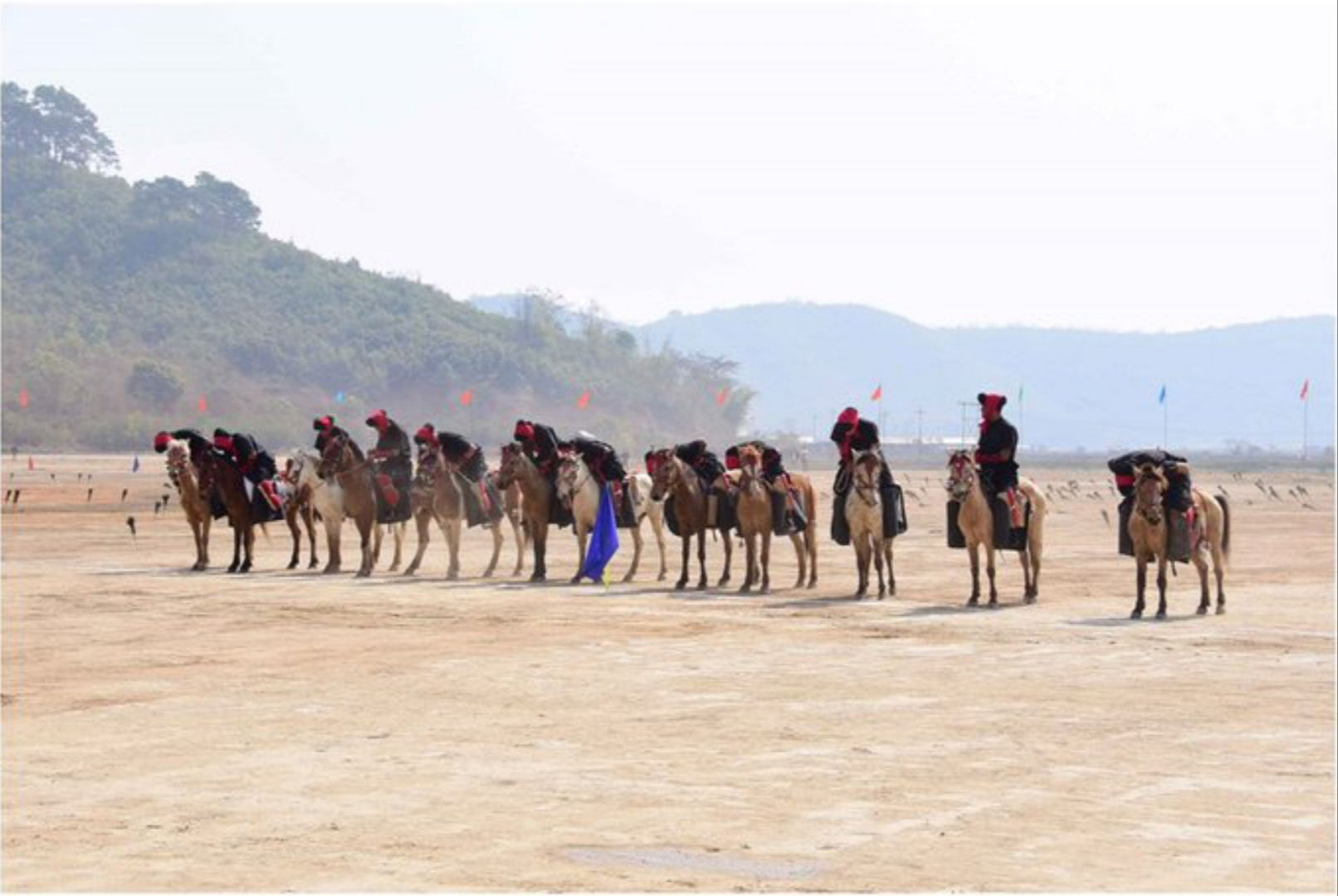

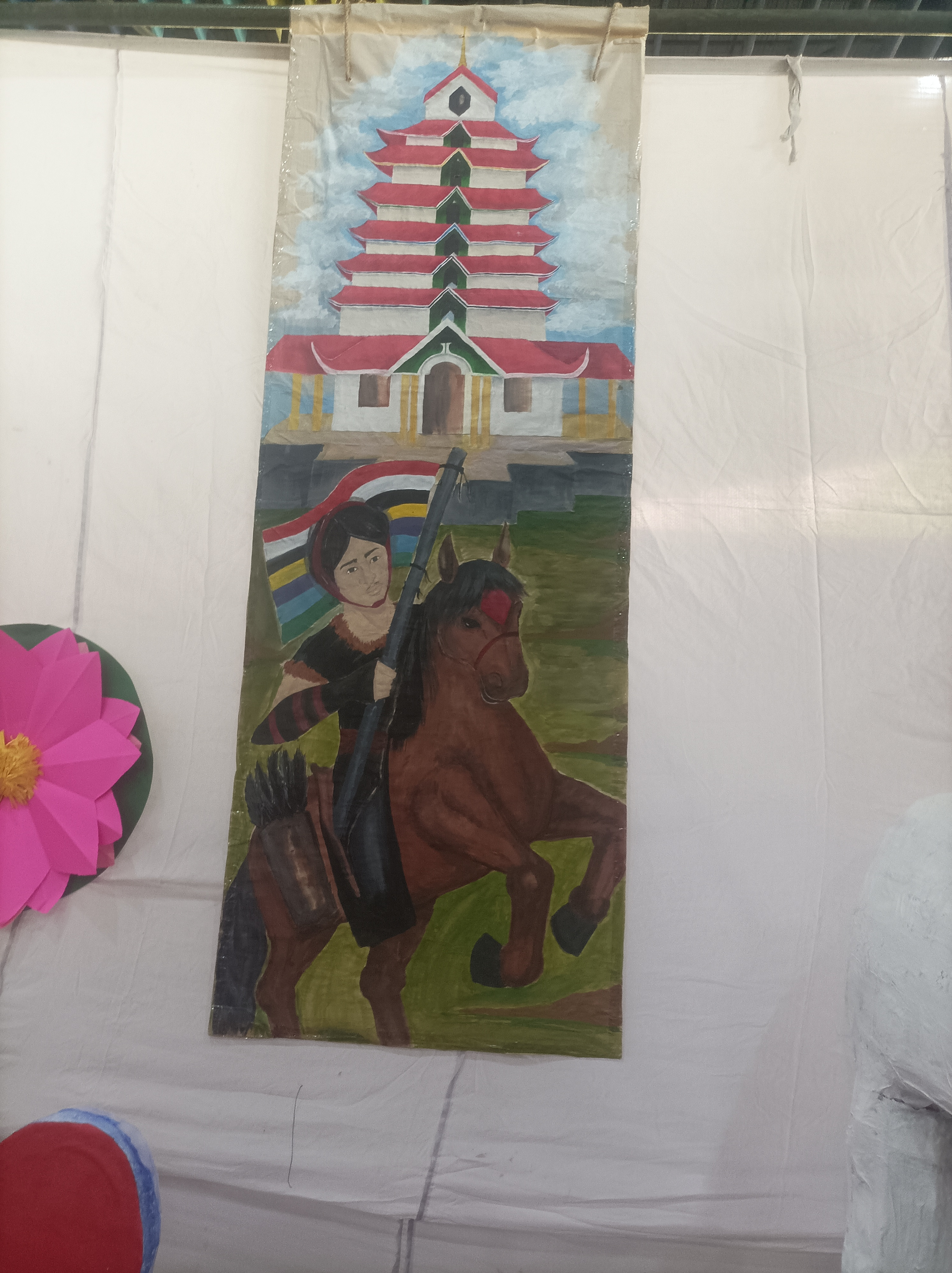

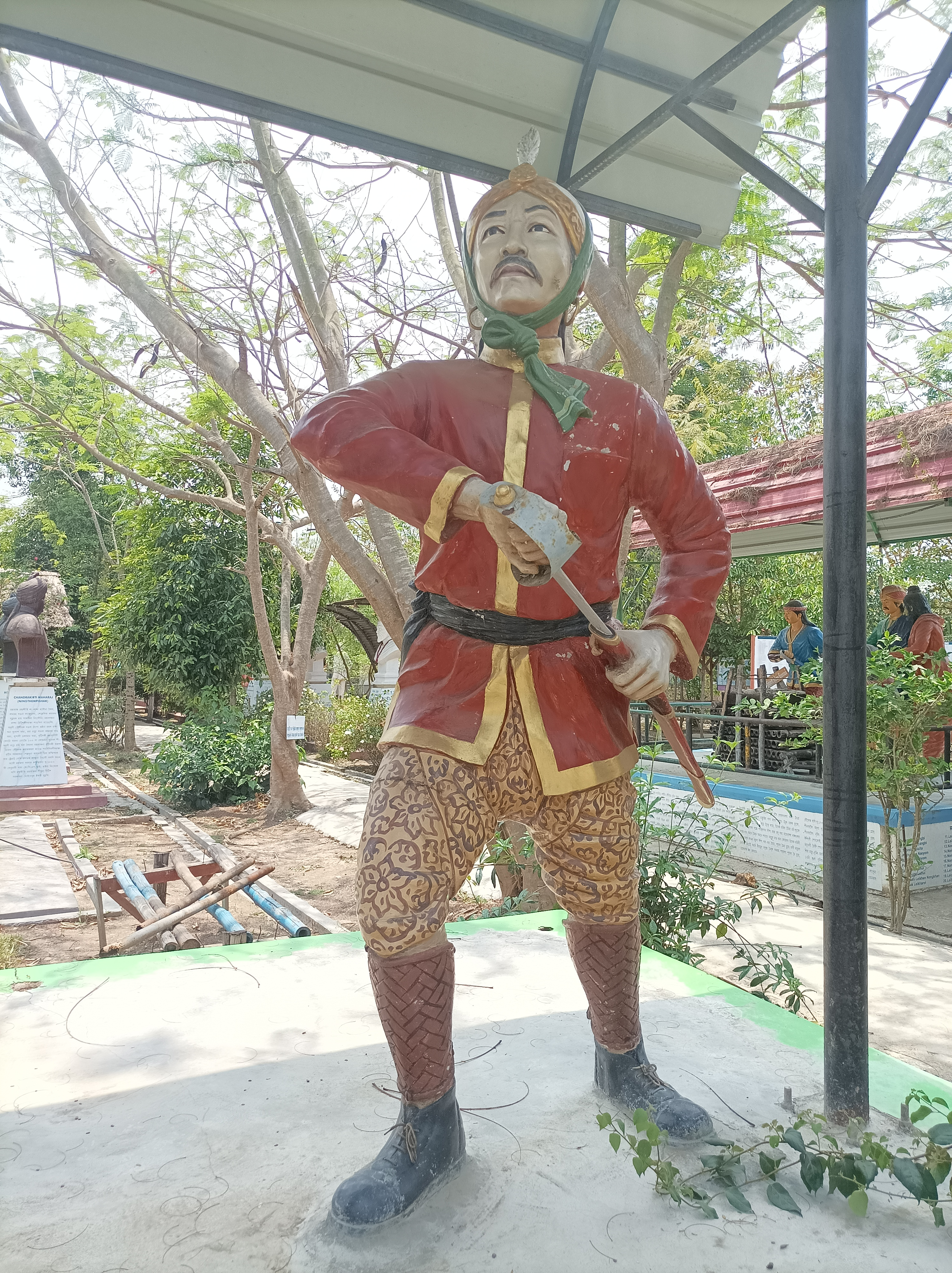

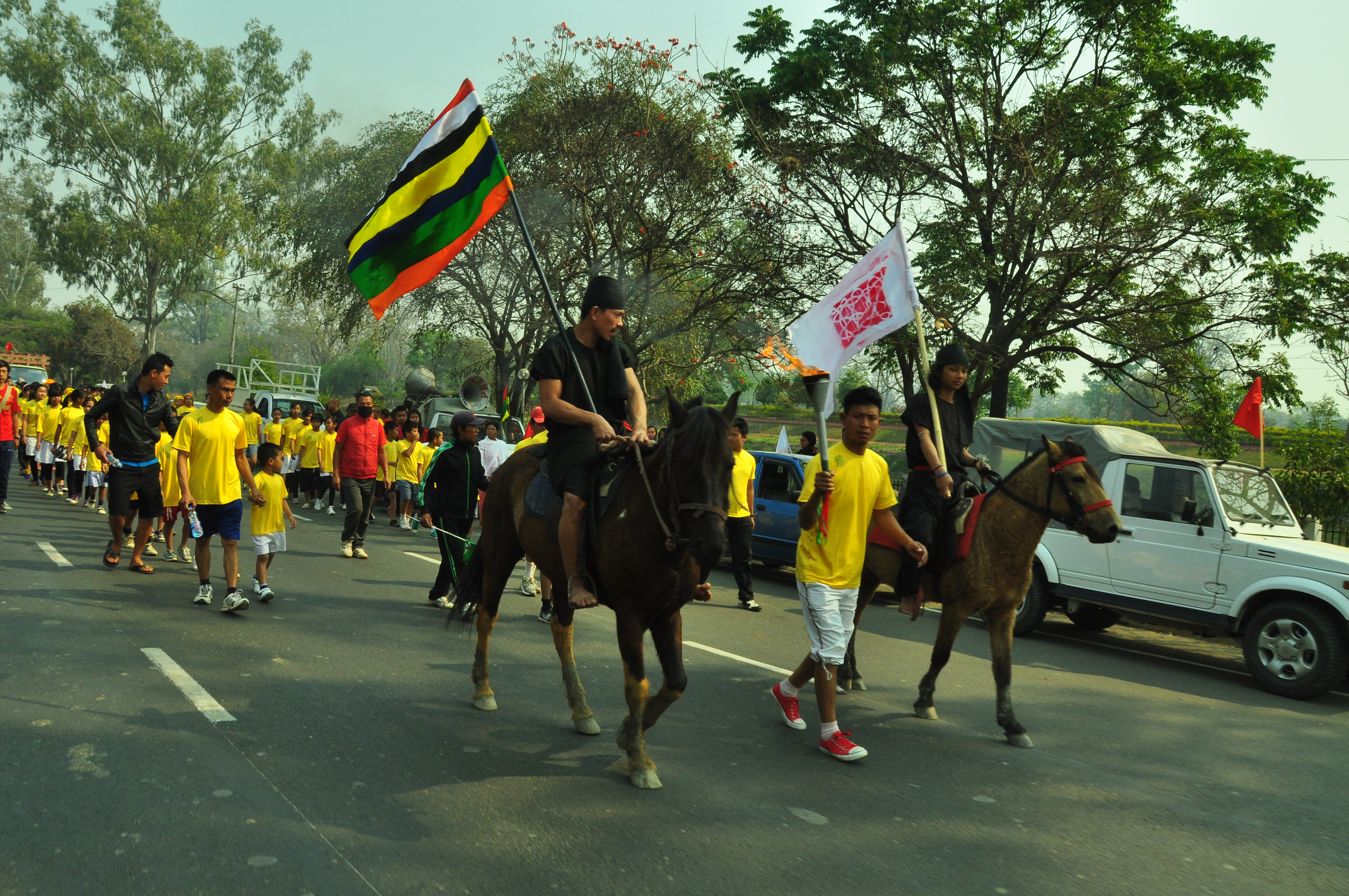

== See also ==
- Shamu (Meitei culture)
- Meitei confederacy
- Meitei martial arts
- Meitei traditional martial arts
  - Thang Ta
  - Sarit Sarak
  - Cheibi
- Meitei traditional weapons
- Meitei traditional toys
- Meitei traditional games
- Meitei royal etiquette
- Anglo Manipuri Treaty (1762)
- Manipur Levy
- Anglo Manipuri Treaty (1833)
- Agreement Regarding Compensation for the Kubo (Kabaw) Valley (1834)
- Anglo-Manipur War
- Ahom–Meitei relations
  - Kuranganayani
  - Meitei people in Assam
    - Induprabha
- Burmese–Meitei relations
  - Chakpa Makhao Ngambi
  - Seven Years' Devastation (Chahi Taret Khuntakpa)
  - Meitei people in Myanmar
  - Meitei–Shan relations
- Takhel Ngamba
  - Meitei queens of Tripura
  - Meitei people in Tripura
- Meitei people in Bangladesh
