= Sagol Lanmi =

Meitei traditional cavalry

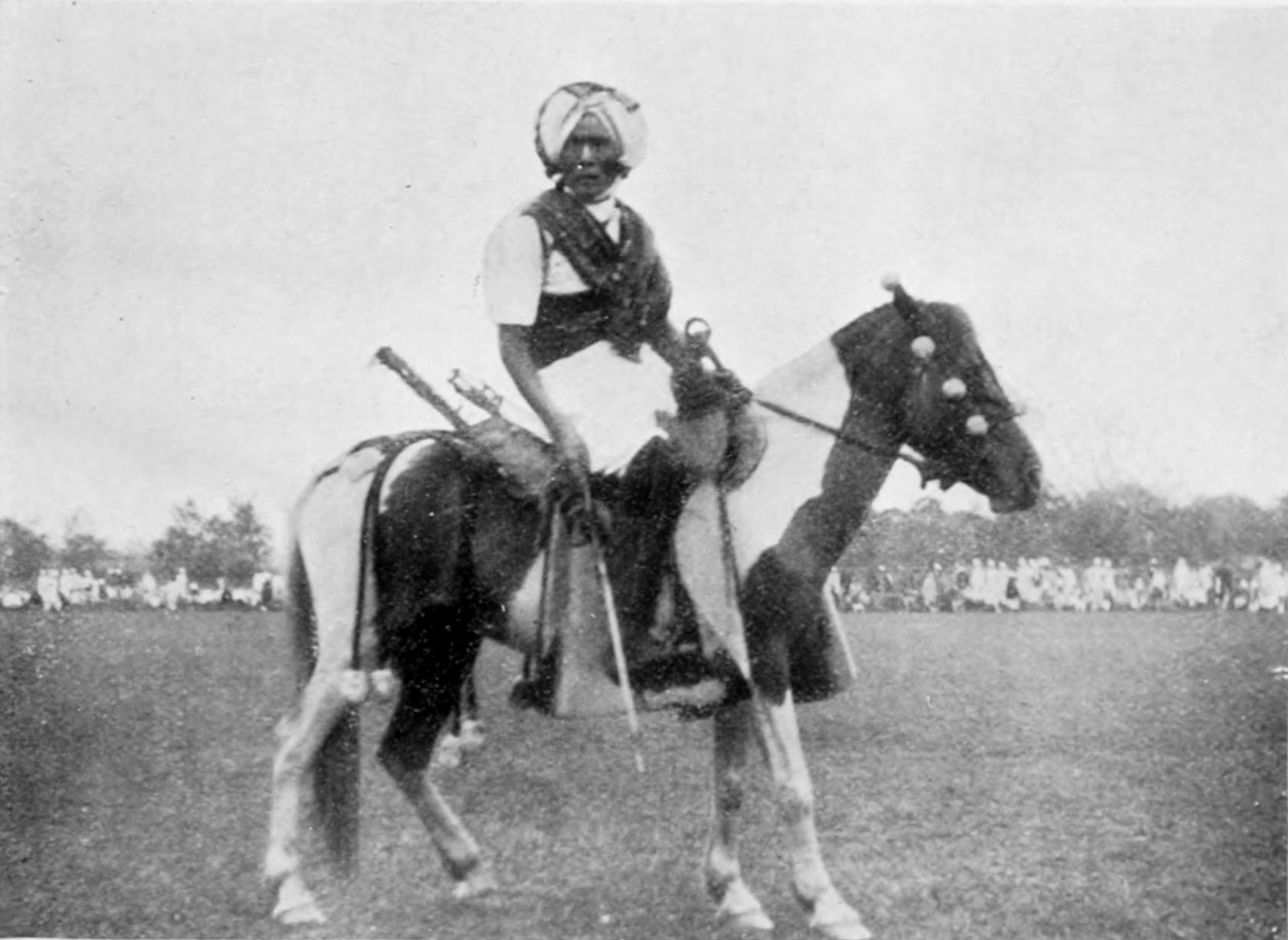
A Meitei warrior carrying the lethal Arambai weapons

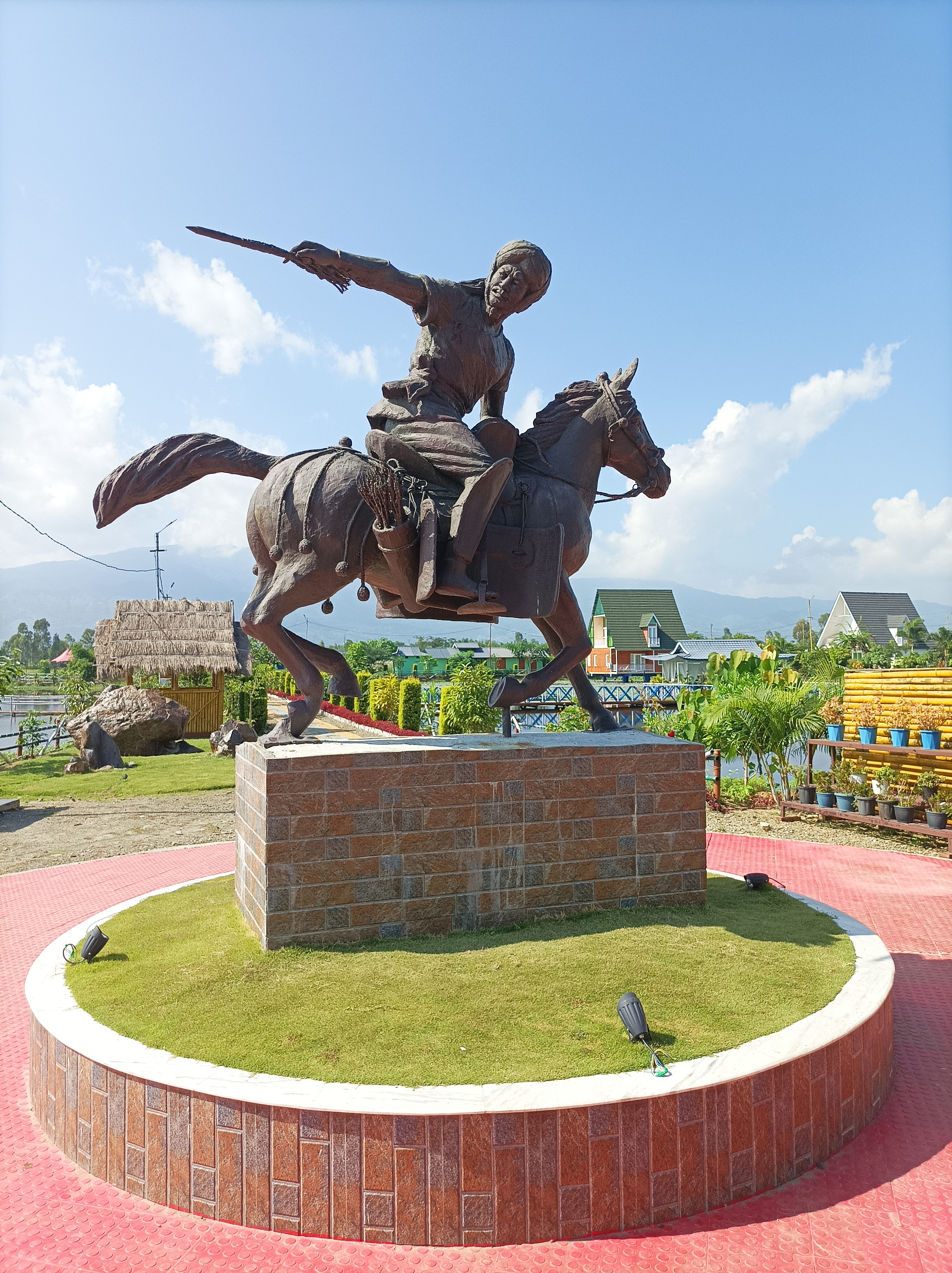
A Classical Meitei sculpture of an ancient Meitei cavalry soldier, trying to throw an Arambai weapon backwards (traditionally towards the pursuing enemies), while riding on a galloping Meitei horse (Manipuri pony)

Sagol Lanmi (Note: written in Meetei Mayek script as ꯁꯒꯣꯜ ꯂꯥꯟꯃꯤ, also spelled as Shagol Lanmee, also known as Sagon Lanmi (ꯁꯒꯣꯟ ꯂꯥꯟꯃꯤ), also spelled as Shagon Lanmee) refers to the cavalry or horse soldiers of the traditional Meitei army, using Manipuri pony. It was one of the three main divisions of the military, along with Khong Lanmi (infantry) and Hi Lanmi (naval or boat army). The cavalry was considered the most effective and important part of the Meitei military forces.

== Overview ==
The Sagol Lanmi were known for their speed, skill, and powerful tactics. Meitei cavalrymen were expert horse riders and fighters who could encircle the enemy quickly, confuse them, and force them to surrender. Their fighting style involved moving rapidly in circles, making sudden attacks, and using different weapons with great accuracy.

Meitei horsemen were compared to centaurs—mythical half-man, half-horse beings—because of their close connection with their horses. A horseman could control his horse perfectly and fight while riding, jumping back and forth, and striking without pause.

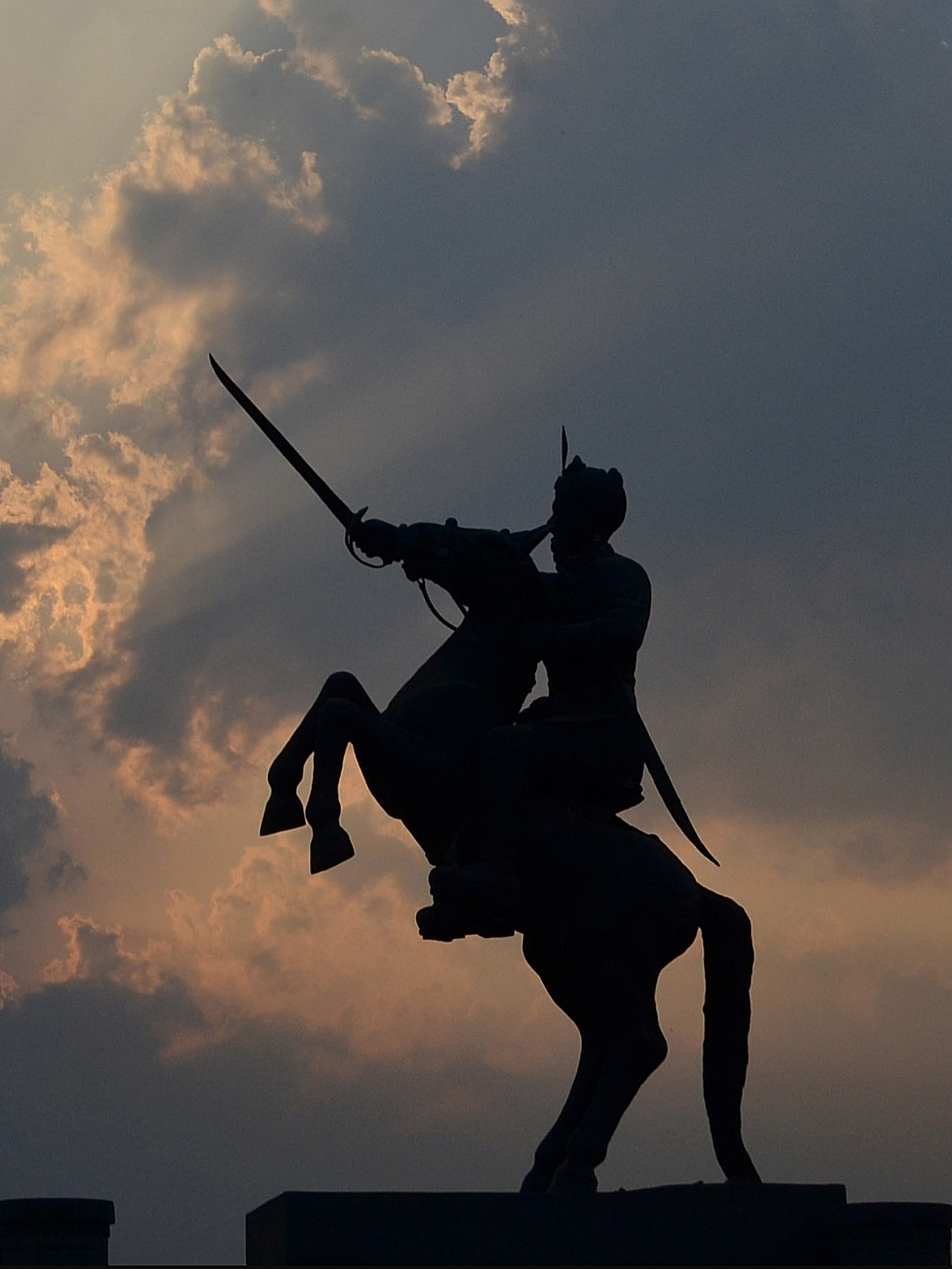
A classical Meitei sculpture of King Gambhir Singh

== Weapons and tactics ==
The Sagol Lanmi were trained to use many weapons, including:

- Thang (Sword)
- Ta (Spear)
- Arambai (poisoned darts thrown while riding)
- Lance
- Hunnata (Spear to hurl)
- Taronta
- Timenta
- Whip (usually with 5–9 strands)

Their tactic was to circle around the enemy, then suddenly strike, slash, pierce, and block the enemy's attacks. The combination of swift horse movements and weapon skills made the cavalry highly effective in battle. These techniques helped defeat enemies like the Awa (Myanmar/Burma), Khagi (China), Mayang (Bengal), and Takhel (Tripura).

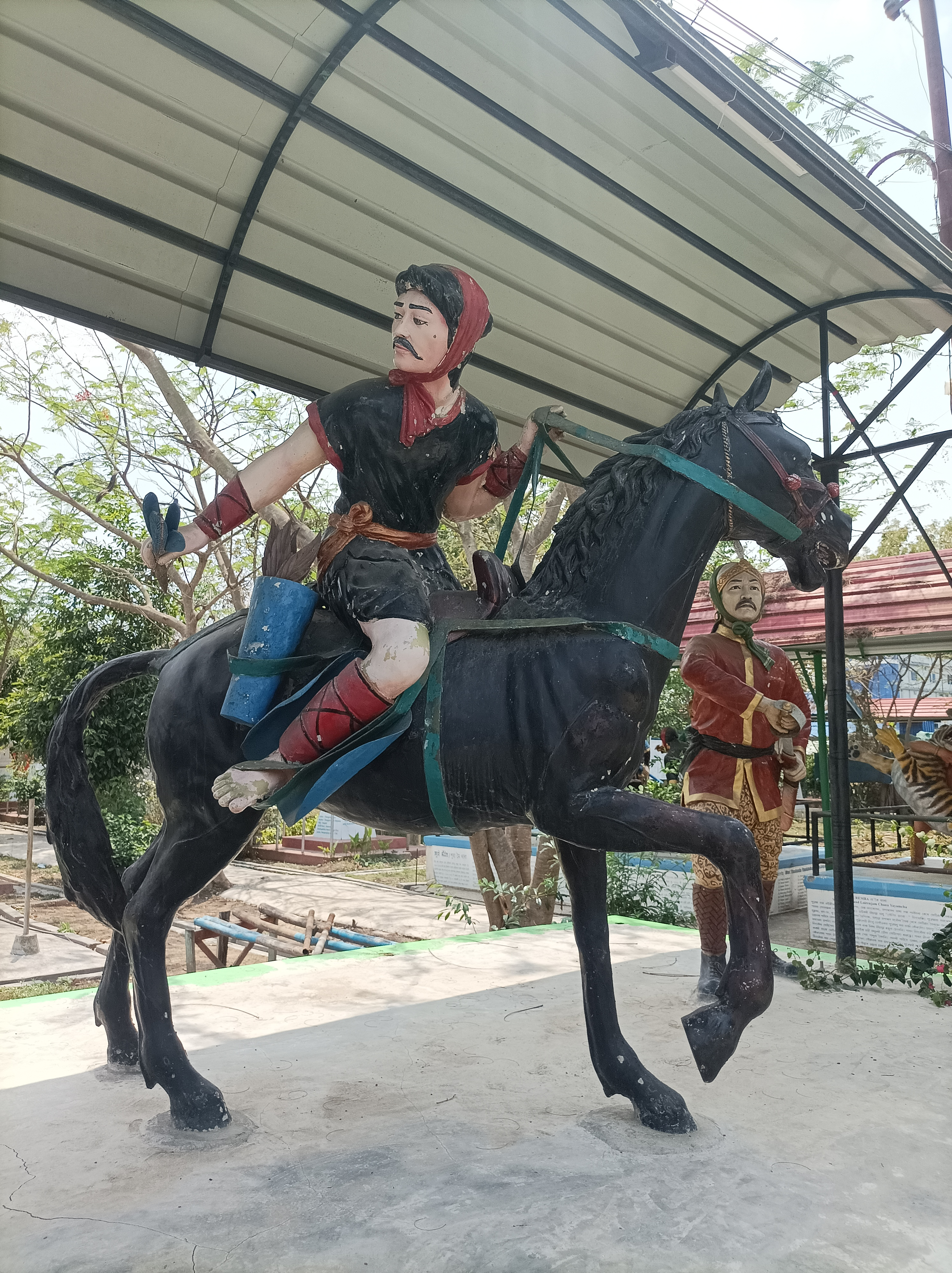
Sculptures of Meitei prince Daku Ningthou Sana Herachandra, riding a Meitei horse and holding an Arambai poisoned dart-like weapon, and King Nara Singh (standing)

== Dress and equipments ==
The Meitei horse soldier wore:

- Pheijom (loincloth/dhoti) tucked up above the knee
- Half-sleeved shirt
- Greaves (leg armor) and gauntlets (arm guards)
- Lanphi (war cloth) worn across the right shoulder
- Wooden sandals (Khurum)
- Kokyet (headdresses/turban), tied with silk thread under the chin to cover the mouth

A sword was placed on the left waist under the Lanphi. A shield (chungoi) was worn on the chest or left side. On the saddle, quivers full of Arambai darts were placed on both sides. The soldier also carried Taronta, Timenta, and a whip. Before going to battle, the horseman would touch the forehead of the horse in respect, mount it from the left side, and ride into war.

== Historical use ==
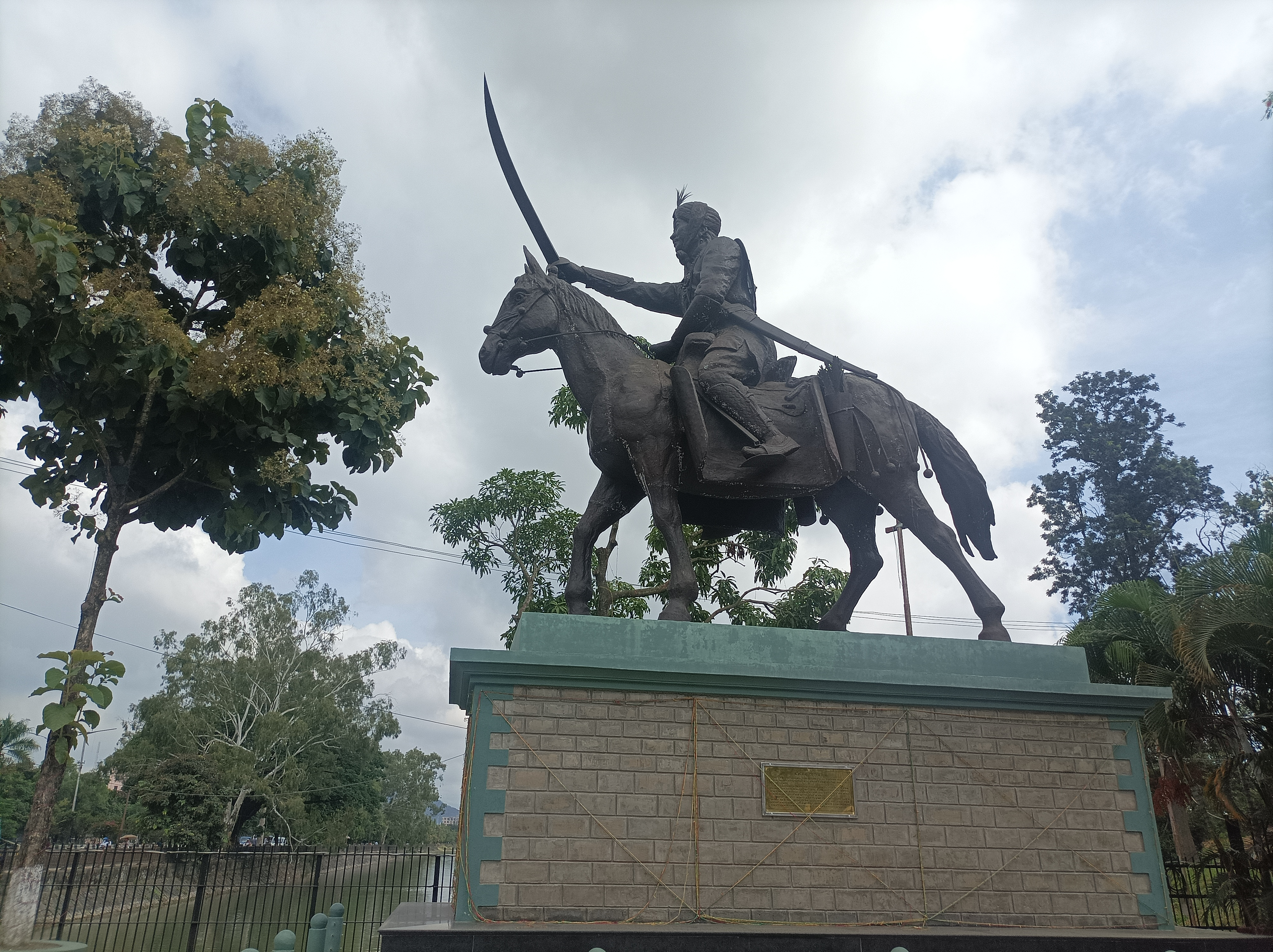
Statue of Meitei king Meidingu Nara Singh, the Maharajah of Kangleipak

Horses were used by the Meitei for military purposes from ancient times. Following kings successfully used cavalry forces in their military campaigns:

- Kiyamba
- Mungyamba
- Khagemba
- Garibaniwaj
- Bhagyachandra
- Chourajit
- Marjit
- Gambhir Singh

During the reign of Garibaniwaj, Meitei horsemen created fear in the minds of the enemy, especially the Awa soldiers.

The cavalry operated under the Lallup system, a form of organized military service, and was considered a model of discipline and effectiveness.

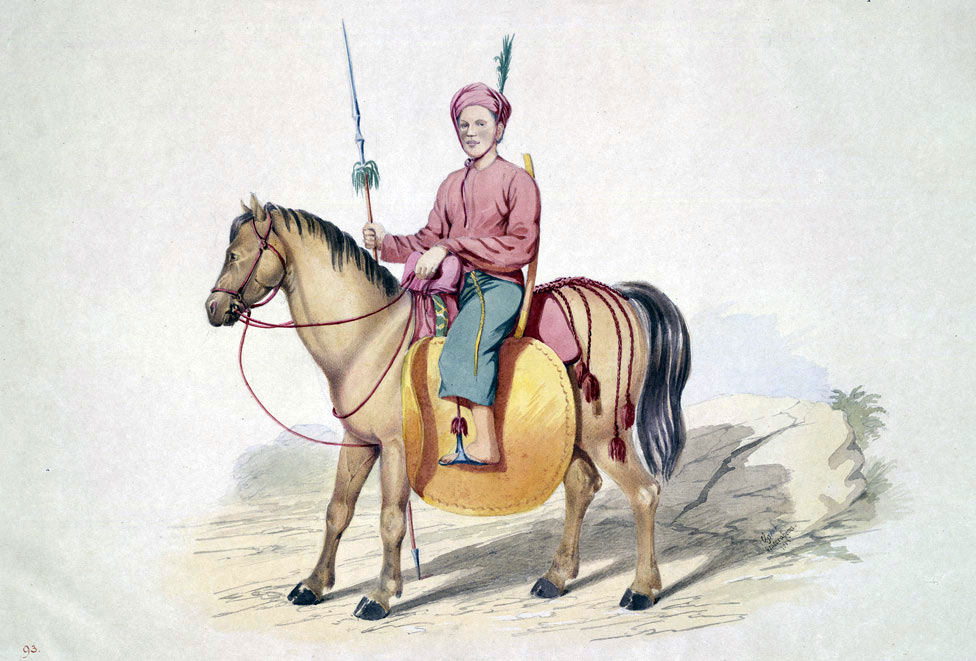
A Meitei horseman in Myanmar

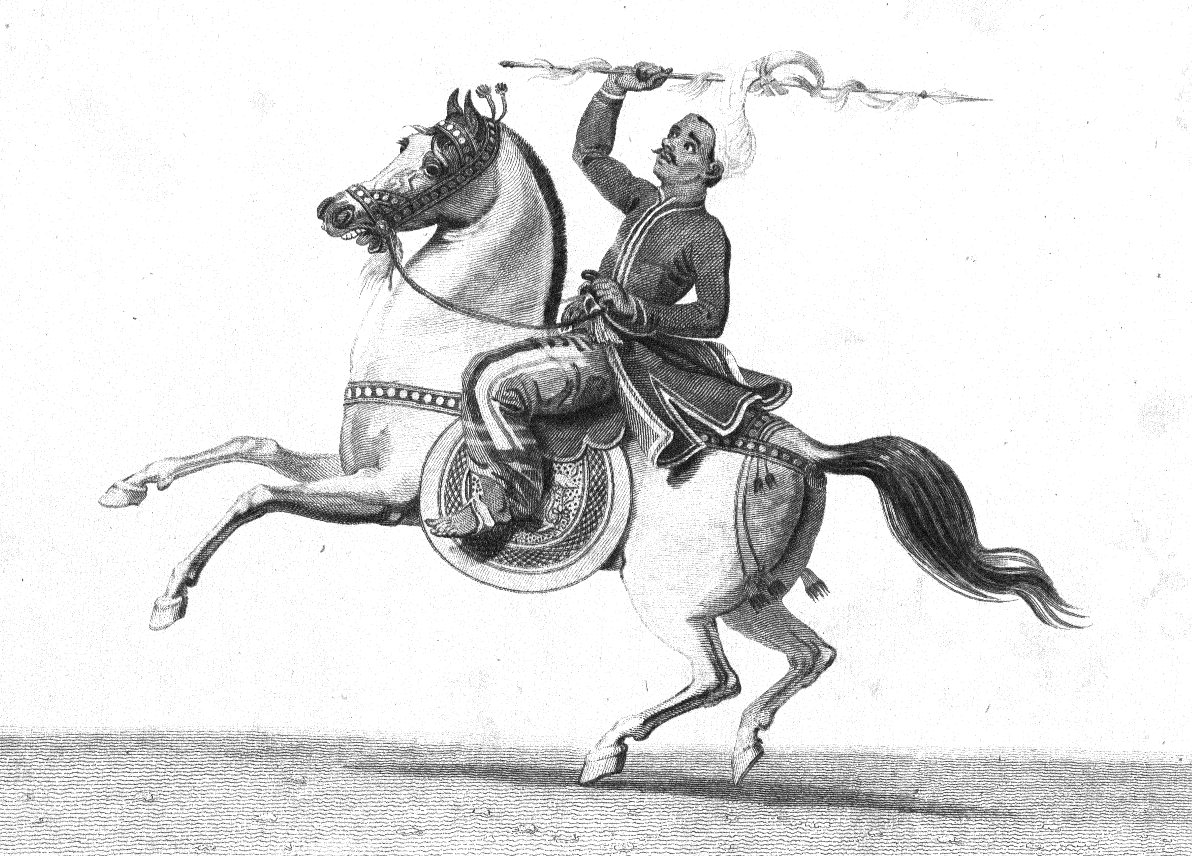
A Meitei horse riding warrior in Myanmar

== See also ==
- Shamu (Meitei culture)
- Meitei confederacy
- Meitei martial arts
  - Thang Ta
  - Sarit Sarak
  - Cheibi
- Meitei traditional weapons
- Meitei traditional toys
- Meitei traditional games
- Meitei royal etiquette
- Anglo Manipuri Treaty (1762)
- Manipur Levy
- Anglo Manipuri Treaty (1833)
- Agreement Regarding Compensation for the Kubo (Kabaw) Valley (1834)
- Anglo-Manipur War
- Ahom–Meitei relations
  - Kuranganayani
  - Meitei people in Assam
    - Induprabha
- Burmese–Meitei relations
  - Chakpa Makhao Ngambi
  - Seven Years' Devastation (Chahi Taret Khuntakpa)
  - Meitei people in Myanmar
  - Meitei–Shan relations
- Takhel Ngamba
  - Meitei queens of Tripura
  - Meitei people in Tripura
- Meitei people in Bangladesh
