= Akangsu =

Akangsu (ꯑꯀꯥꯡꯁꯨ) was a Meitei warrior from ancient Kangleipak (early Manipur), whose memorable encounter with a Khuman fighter named Maithingkongaba is notably mentioned in the classical Meitei historic martial text Chainarol. Unlike many warriors chronicled in the text, Akangsu's story is known not for brute strength or bloody combat, but for cleverness, patience, and unexpected mercy, which stood in contrast to the typical glorification of headhunting and vengeance. Akangsu is remembered as an unconventional hero, as he challenges the typical glorification of violence in the Chainarol and offers a rare example of mercy triumphing over vengeance. It stands out as a lesson in humility, cleverness, and the power of restraint.

== Background ==
In the martial society of ancient Kangleipak (early Manipur), warriors from various clans upheld personal and clan honour through ritualized single combats, often resulting in the death of one combatant and the taking of his head by the victor. These stories were collected in the Chainarol, a record of 27 duels that reflect the values, ethics, and drama of the warrior class.

Akangsu was a member of the Meitei Mangang clan and is remembered for his surprising victory over a fully armed Khuman warrior using wit and restraint rather than sheer force.

== Duel at Waisen Pheibok Yi ==
Akangsu's most famous encounter took place at a location called Waisen Pheibok Yi, where he was peacefully engaged in fishing when he was approached by Maithingkongaba, a Khuman warrior dressed in full battle gear and carrying sword, spear, and shield. Maithingkongaba, spoiling for a fight, challenged Akangsu to a duel.

Not ready for battle and preoccupied with his fishing, Akangsu requested a delay, saying he had not caught enough fish. Maithingkongaba, possibly amused or overconfident, agreed and rested under a tree.

Taking advantage of this moment, Akangsu quietly approached the sleeping warrior, overpowered him, and tied his hands and feet.

== Act of mercy ==
With the tide turned unexpectedly, Maithingkongaba pleaded for his life and offered Akangsu his weapons and warrior attire as tokens of submission. Rather than killing him, despite having the opportunity and justification under the warrior code, Akangsu chose to spare his life.

He returned home in triumph, not with a head as was customary, but with the symbolic trophies of his opponent, the sword, shield, and attire of a warrior, showing his cleverness and dominance without bloodshed.

== See also ==
- Meitei martial arts
- Meitei traditional weapons
- Khuman martial traditions
- Khuman kingdom
- Meitei warriors
