= Hee Lanmi =

Meitei traditional navy

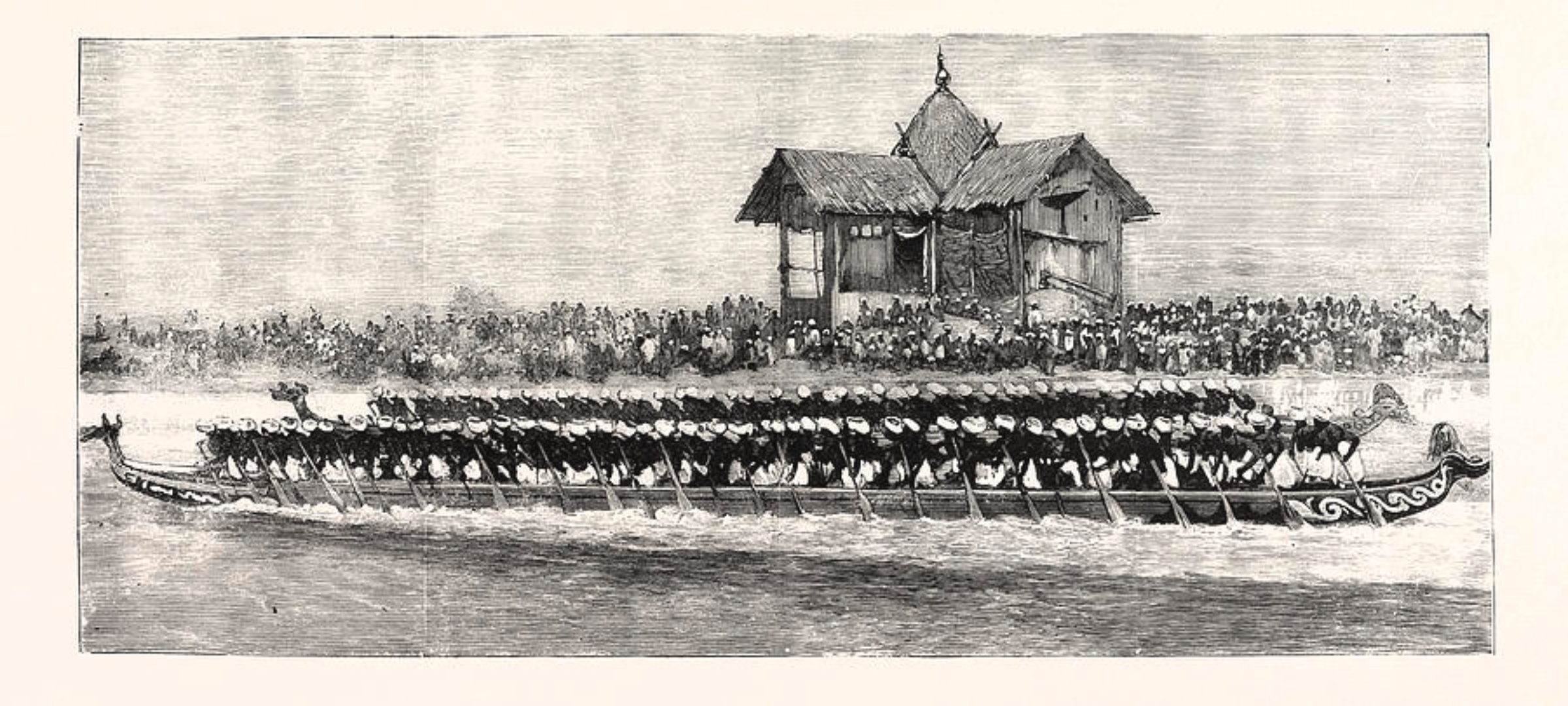
The Hiyang Tannaba, a traditional Meitei boat race, was usually held as a form of war training and later, as a festival for entertainment

Hee Lanmi, (Note: written in Meetei Mayek script as ꯍꯤ ꯂꯥꯟꯃꯤ.) also spelled as Hi Lanmi or Hee Lanmee, refers to the boat army or naval force of the traditional Meitei military. It was one of the three divisions of the military, along with Khong Lanmi (infantry) and Sagol Lanmi (cavalry). The Hee Lanmi played a crucial role in both warfare and transportation, especially in a time when roads and bridges were few.

The Hee Lanmi was an essential part of Manipur’s military and cultural history. It reflected the adaptability of the Meitei military system, using the region’s natural waterways for defense, trade, and communication, and forming a unique naval tradition that combined warfare and cultural celebration.

== Overview ==
In ancient Kangleipak (early Manipur), the region was filled with rivers, lakes, swamps, and wetlands. Due to the lack of proper roads, boats were widely used for travel, trade, and communication. The Meitei kings developed the Hee Lanmi to carry out military operations on water. This force was skilled in rowing, fighting on boats, and handling various weapons while at sea or river.

== Organization and function ==
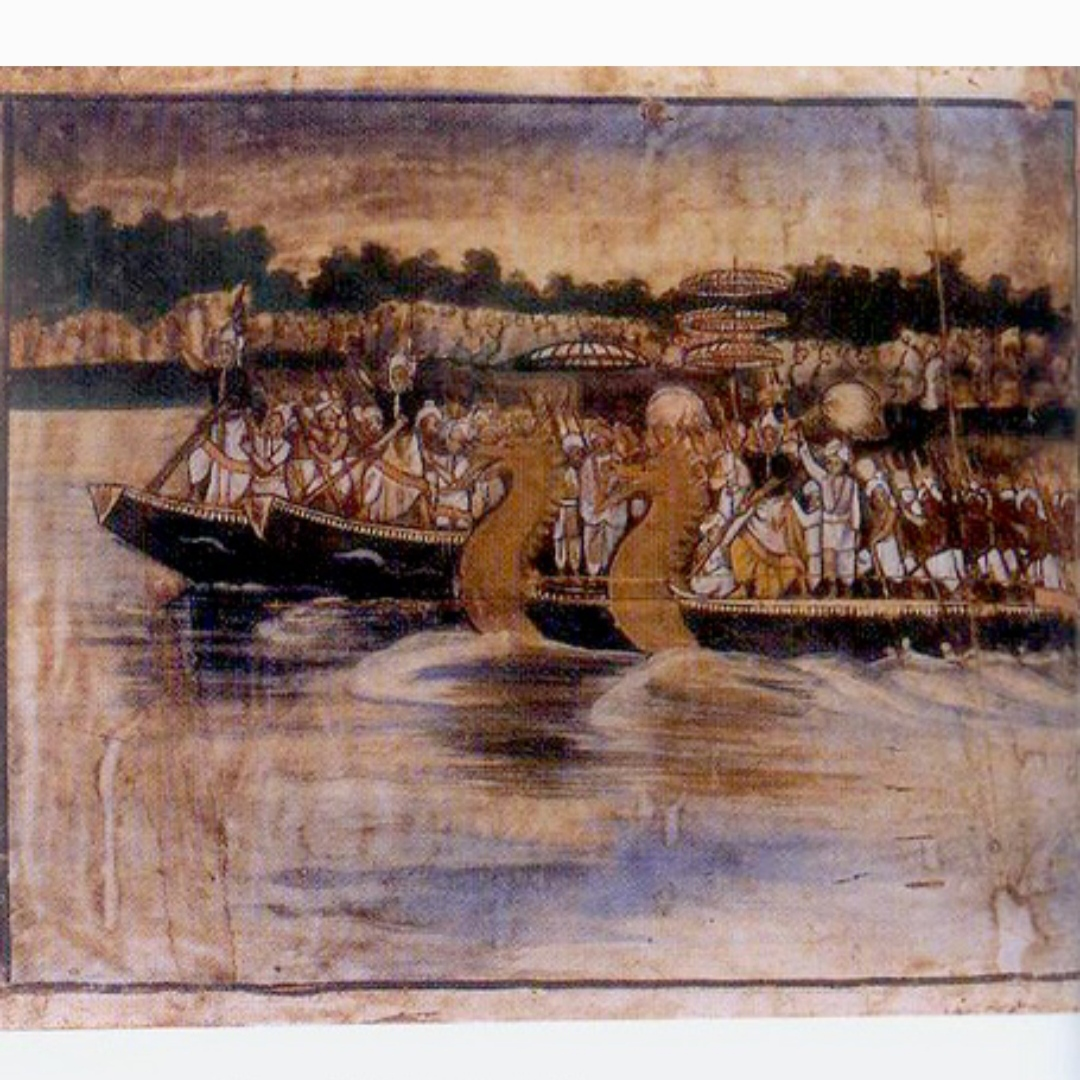
The Hiyang Tannaba, a traditional Meitei boat race, was usually held as a form of war training and later, as a festival for entertainment

To maintain a strong naval force, the kings kept a large number of boats on major rivers such as the Ningthi River in the east and the Barak River in the west. They used to train the boat soldiers to be experts in combat, rowing, and handling Meitei traditional weapons. They held the Hiyang Tannaba, a traditional Meitei boat race, as a form of war training and later, as a festival for entertainment.

The Hiyang Loishang (Department of Boat Building) was responsible for constructing war boats. King Khagemba even set up a department called Mayang Hishaba Loishang, specifically for boat makers.

== Uniform and dress ==
Though there was no strict distinction between infantry and cavalry uniforms, members of the armed forces (including the boat army) typically wore:

- Pheijom (loincloth/dhoti)
- Red jackets
- White Kokyets (headdresses/turbans)
- A piece of cloth called Khadangchet to tie the turban under the chin

High-ranking officers, such as generals, wore Khamenchatpa and decorated their headdresses with Pajeng Phiral (the champion's flag).

== Significance ==
Depiction of Meitei Hiyang Tannaba in a tableau representing Manipur, passing through the Raj path, during the 61st Republic Day Parade-2010, in New Delhi

The Hee Lanmi allowed Meitei kings to conduct military campaigns via rivers, secure trade routes, and improve communication with distant regions. The annual boat races not only strengthened the navy but also kept the people engaged in cultural and martial traditions.

== Historical mentions ==
Historical texts like the Shang Panabagi Masil mention the activities of the Department of War, including cutting trees and bamboo to construct boats and clear waterways.

== Gallery ==
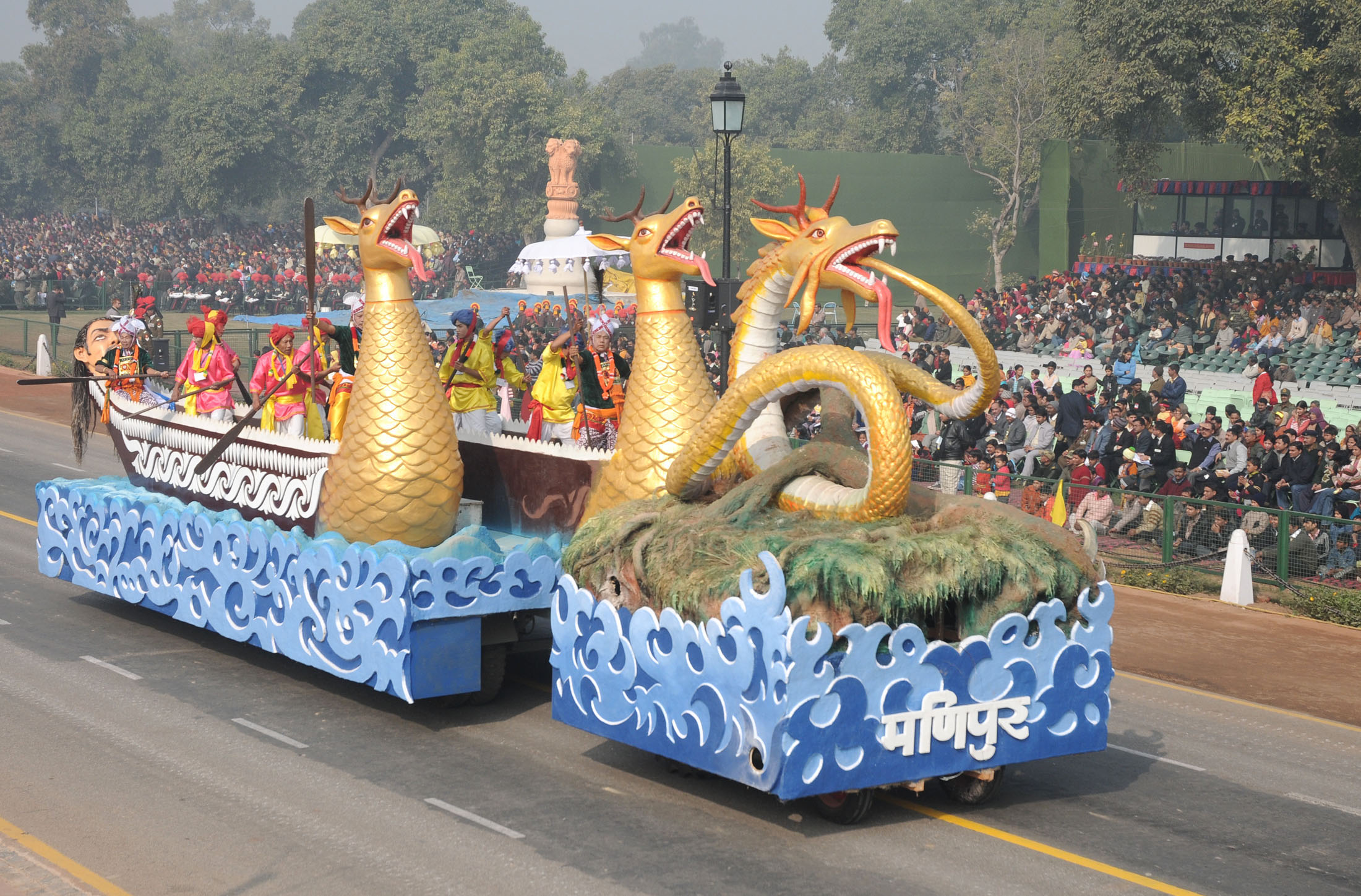

== See also ==
- Shamu (Meitei culture)
- Meitei confederacy
- Meitei martial arts
  - Thang Ta
  - Sarit Sarak
  - Cheibi
- Meitei traditional weapons
- Meitei traditional toys
- Meitei traditional games
- Meitei royal etiquette
- Anglo Manipuri Treaty (1762)
- Manipur Levy
- Anglo Manipuri Treaty (1833)
- Agreement Regarding Compensation for the Kubo (Kabaw) Valley (1834)
- Anglo-Manipur War
- Ahom–Meitei relations
  - Kuranganayani
  - Meitei people in Assam
    - Induprabha
- Burmese–Meitei relations
  - Chakpa Makhao Ngambi
  - Seven Years' Devastation (Chahi Taret Khuntakpa)
  - Meitei people in Myanmar
  - Meitei–Shan relations
- Takhel Ngamba
  - Meitei queens of Tripura
  - Meitei people in Tripura
- Meitei people in Bangladesh
