= Paona Brajabasi =

Major rank official Meitei of 18th century for Manipur Kingdom

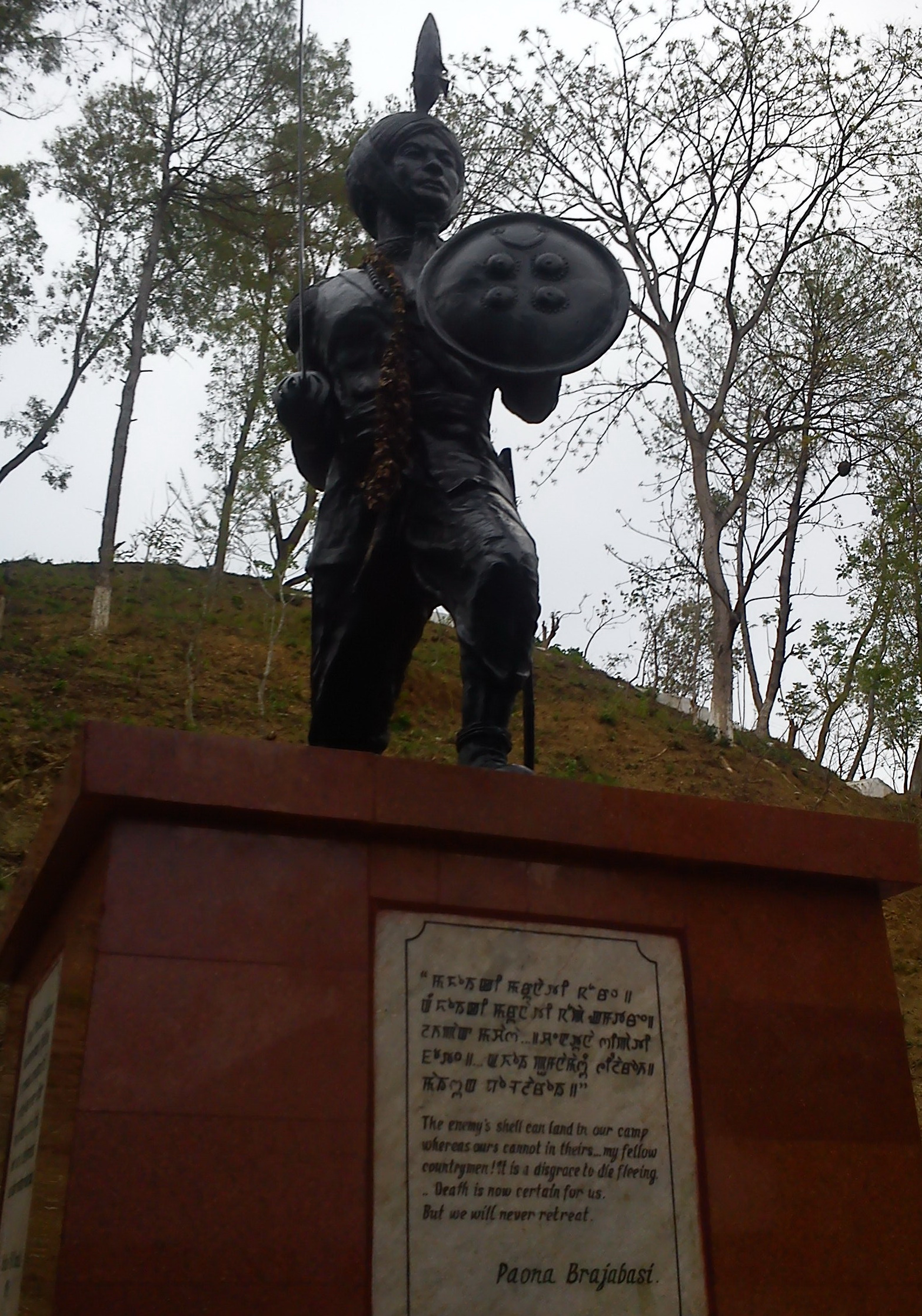
- Native name: Paonam Nawol Singh
- Born: 1833
- Died: April 23, 1891 (aged 57–58) Khongjom
- Allegiance: Manipur Kingdom
- Rank: Major

Paona Brajabasi was a Manipuri military officer. He was born in about 1833 and later entered the military of the Manipur Kingdom, reaching the rank of major by 1891. The same year he fought in the Anglo-Manipur War against the British Empire. Following the defeat of his troops in a skirmish with the British, his adversaries offered to spare Brajabasi's life if he entered their service. Brajabasi refused and was subsequently executed. This act entered Manipur's popular imagination and Brajabasi has since been commemorated by a statue.
