= Arambai =

Traditional Meitei dart-like weapon

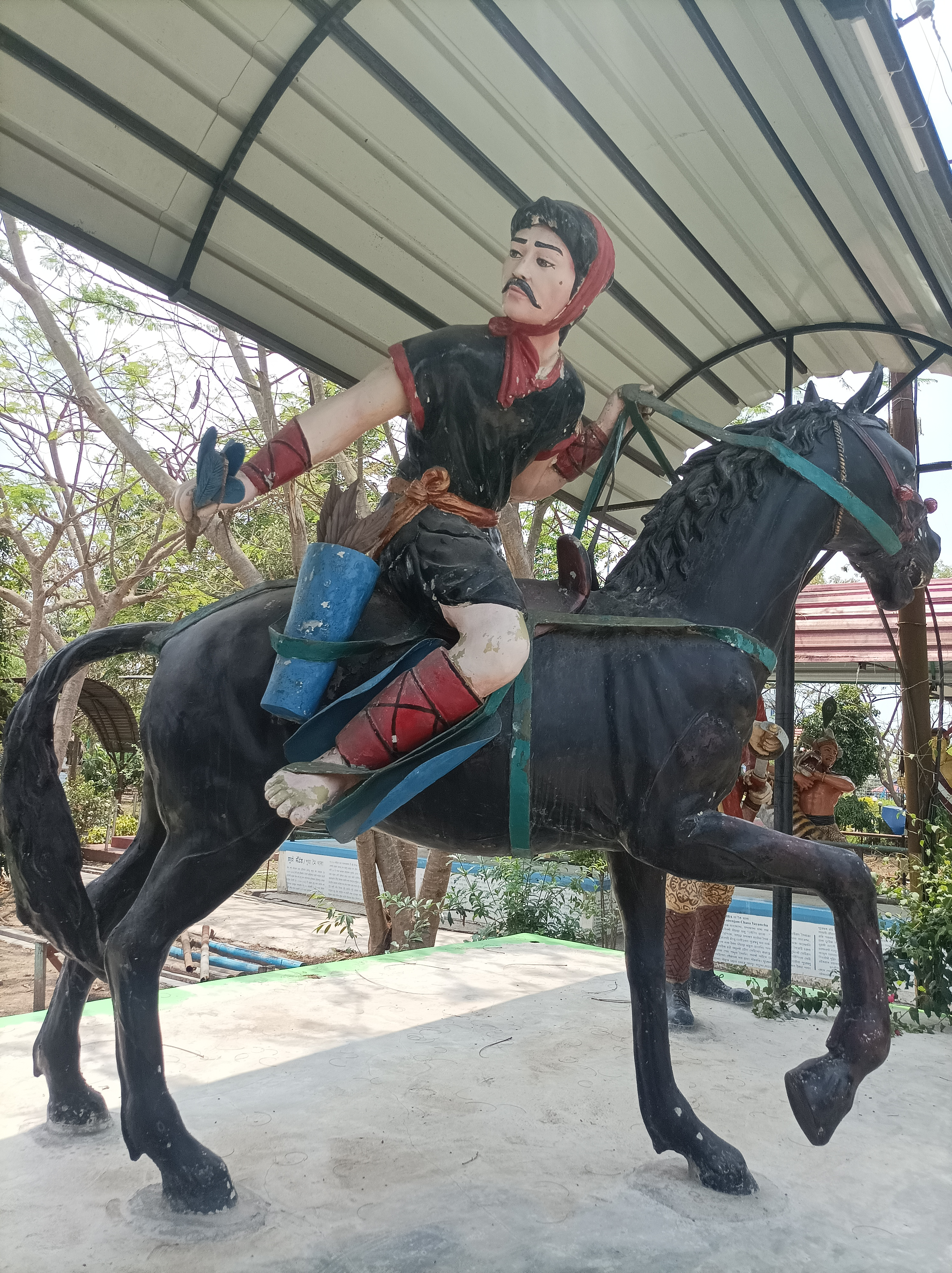
Statue of Meitei prince Daku Ningthou Sana Herachandra of Kangleipak (Manipur Kingdom), holding an Arambai, displayed in the MMRC & Unity Park, Khangabok, Thoubal district

Arambai, also known as Alapai tenton (meaning arrowhead flew in distance), is a dart weapon used by the Meitei cavalry soldiers of Kangleipak while mounted on Manipur Ponies. The cavalry armies used arambai as attacking or retreating weapon, and it is usually poisoned.
