= Meitei people in Myanmar =

Meitei people in Myanmar (Burmese: ကသည်းလူမျိုး, romanized: Kathe luumyo)
ꯃꯩꯇꯩ
- Cultural flag of the Meiteis

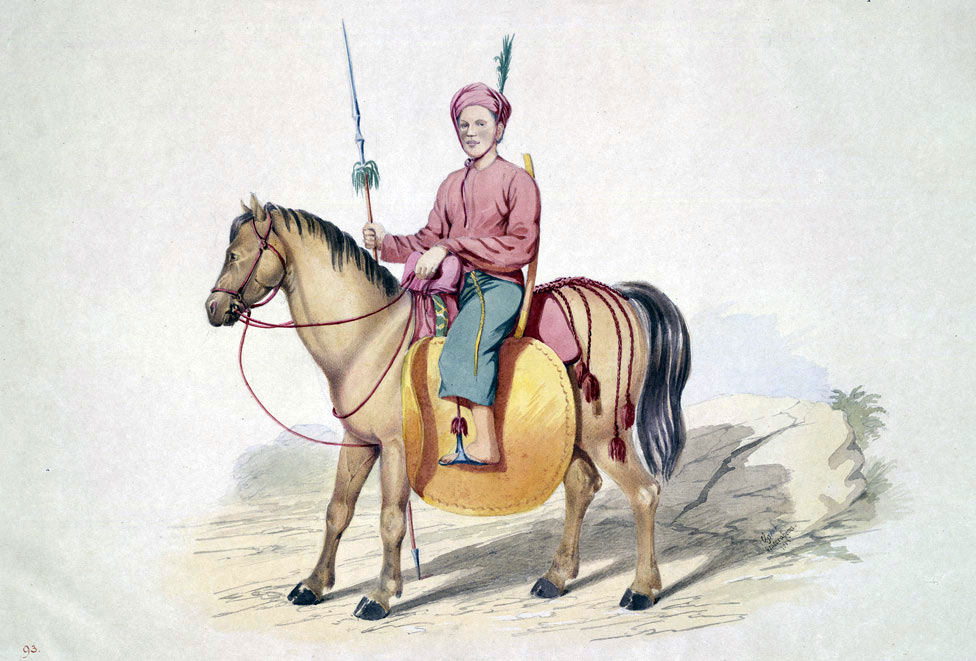
- A painting of Meitei horseman in Myanmar

Total population
- 25,000 (2015)

Languages
- Meitei, Burmese

Religion
- Hinduism (majority), Sanamahism, Buddhism

The Meitei people, also known as the Manipuri people (Meitei: ꯃꯩꯇꯩ ꯀꯥꯡꯂꯨꯞ; Burmese: ကသည်းလူမျိုး, romanized: Kathe Lumyo, lit. 'Kathe people'), are a minority ethnic group in Myanmar. They are better known as the Kathe, Cassay, or Ponna in Myanmar. They number around 25,000 and reside mainly in the eastern states of Kachin and Shan, Yangon division, Sagaing division, and Ayeyarwaddy division.

The Government of Myanmar currently classifies the Meiteis as a sub-group under the "Chin" category. However, there have been proposals to reconsider and revise this classification.

== History ==
Meitei settlement in Myanmar was a result of the Manipuri–Burmese wars of 1717 to 1749 as well as of the matrimonial alliance formed by the marriage of Meitei princess Chakpa Makhao Ngambi to Burmese King Taninganway Min in 1703.

During the reign of Meitei King Senbi Kiyamba (Meitei: ꯅꯤꯡꯊꯧ ꯀꯤꯌꯥꯝꯕ) (1467-1508 CE), the eastern border of Kangleipak extended to the Ningthee River. According to Henry Yule map, this border was drawn beyond the Ningthee River between 1500 and 1580 CE. The Kabo Valley (Meitei: ꯀꯕꯣ ꯇꯝꯄꯥꯛ) is located between the Yoma mountain range, which forms the eastern boundary of the Manipur Valley, and the Ningthee River.

Before and after 1648, Kangleipak and Myanmar were at war. In 1735, Meitei King Garibaniwaj (Meitei: ꯅꯤꯡꯊꯧ ꯒꯔꯤꯕ ꯅꯤꯋꯥꯖ) attacked Myedu, in the present-day Shwebo region of Myanmar. He took cattle and slaves, destroyed Burmese villages and pagodas, and sent cavalry to the upper part of Myanmar, but he was defeated by the army of Myanmar. In 1738, Garibaniwaj entered the Kaunghmudaw pagoda and marked the eastern door with a sword. In July 1757, Burmese King Alungpaya captured thousands of Meiteis and settled them in Sagaing and Amarapura regions.

In December 1764, the Burmese from Myedu invaded Kangleipak. They took some Meitei people from Manipur to Ava, which was the capital city at different times. He settled them around the city. Burmese King Alungpaya made a cavalry unit from these people. Later, he invaded Thailand with 500 of these cavalry soldiers. In 1780, Burmese King Bodawpaya brought some Meiteis from Manipur to Mogok to work in the ruby mines. In 1812, he brought more Meiteis from Manipur and let them live there.

According to Francis Hamilton, the Meitei settlement in Myanmar in 1768 is described as follows:

"Burmese invaded Manipur about the year 1768 and for eight years remained there, committing every kind of devastation. The country previously had contained a very great number of horses, other cattle not above one in a hundred of which was left behind. He (a priest of Raja Bheigyachandra) thinks that (they) carried away or destroyed 300,000 persons of different ages and sexes and indeed it was alleged, when I was at Ava that 100,000 captives remained near the city."

Regarding the Meitei settlement in Myanmar, W.S. Desai said,

"the captured Manipuris were settled in the districts of Amarapura and Sagaing They introduced the Acheik pattern in silk into Burma. The Burmese monarch enrolled Manipuris into his army in cavalry corps. When Alaungpaya invaded Siam, he had 500 Manipuri (Meitei) horseman with him. Manipuri Brahmins served as astrologers and priests at royal state functions."

Regarding the forced Meitei immigration to Myanmar, scholar L. Ibungohal said that "Ibungsai Joyram continued guerrilla (war) against the Burmese. Burmese officers treacheroulsy arrested him with 30,000 Manipuri followers and sent them to Burma."

Regarding the Meitei settlement in Myanmar, A.C. Banerjee said, "... thousands of people were deported for settlement in Sagaing and Amarapora districts. Among them were boatman, silk workers and silver smith. From this time onwards the astrologers at the Burmese court were Manipuri Brahmins, while Manipuris formed a cavalry in the Burmese army known as Cassay (Manipuri) Horse."

During the rule of Meitei King Marjit (1813–1819), the Burmese King Bagyidaw from Myanmar invaded Manipur. This led to a period called the Seven Years Devastation (Meitei: ꯆꯍꯤ ꯇꯔꯦꯠ ꯈꯨꯟꯇꯥꯛꯄ), which lasted from 1819 to 1826. During this time, King Bagyidaw took some Meitei people to Myanmar by promising them jobs. In 1820 and 1821, he took 30,000 Meitei people each year to Myanmar. Later, Meitei King Gambhir Singh (Meitei: ꯅꯤꯡꯊꯧ ꯒꯝꯚꯤꯔ ꯁꯤꯡꯍ) of Manipur, with the help of the British, formed the Manipur Levy and drove the invaders out of Manipur.

Before and during the first Anglo-Burmese war (1764–1824), the total number of Meiteis captured and killed by the Burmese was approximately two lakhs, which was nearly nine-tenth of the total Meitei population of that period.

In the "Supplementary LXXXV of Eastern Frontier of British India", Captain R.B. Pemberton documented the status of the Meiteis in Myanmar as follows "There are hundreds of captive Casseys now in Ava, and living within 500 yards of the residency, besides many others scattered over different parts of the kingdom, the majority of these, however, were taken during former wars, and have become naturalised."

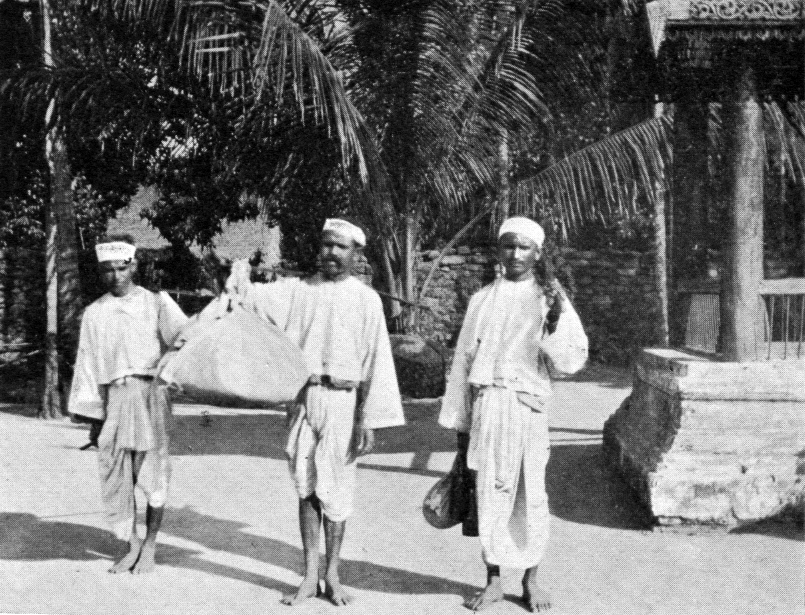
Meitei-speaking Brahmins (Meitei Brahmins) in Myanmar

== Language and scripts ==
Most Meiteis are preserving their mother language, though some Meitei youths do not speak their language after converting to Buddhism.

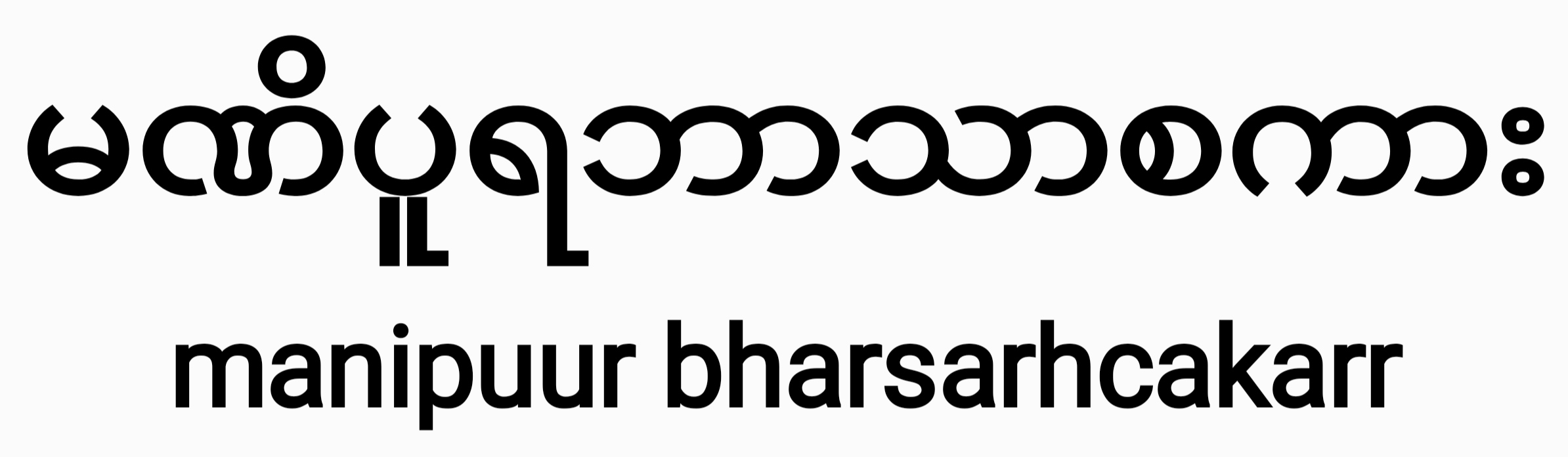
Burmese translation & transliteration of "Meitei language" (alias "Manipuri language")

According to the 1931 census report of Myanmar, two out of every three Myanmar Meiteis could understand and speak Meitei language (Burmese: ကသည်းဘာသာစကား, romanized: Kathe bharsarhcakarr). As of 2011, Meiteis living in Yangon, around Mandalay, near Amarapura and Sagaing, etc. no longer use their mother language as first language at homes. As an exception, those living by the Ningthi river banks, can speak the language. Overall, while most youth cannot speak the language, amongst those who can, girls were found more capable than boys.

An organization named "United Meitei Language and Cultural Group" was formed in Mandalay on 1 December 1997 to give Meitei language lessons to the Meitei families, at least on a weekly basis. But, it was not successful.

Some Meiteis of Yangon and Mandalay can write and read their language written in Bengali script. Some elders of Mandalay can write in archaic Meitei Mayek script.

Historically, when these Meiteis left their homeland to live in Myanmar, they took Meitei language books on Sagei Yumdaba (Meitei: ꯁꯥꯒꯩ ꯌꯨꯝꯗꯥꯕ, settlement of clans), Subika Laishaba (Meitei: ꯁꯨꯕꯤꯀꯥ ꯂꯥꯏꯁꯥꯕ, illustrated manuscripts about the human activities related to the twelve months), written in archaic Meitei script. They translated these books into Burmese (Burmese language). Meiteis of Ningthi river basin did not learn Burmese language before the Second World War era as they believed that it was inferior. Afterwards, they started learning it.

== Religions ==
Most Meiteis are Hindus, some are converted into Buddhism, but also practised traditional Meitei religious beliefs, such as worship of Umang Lai (Meitei: ꯎꯃꯪ ꯂꯥꯏ, forest deities) and Apokpa Khurumba (Meitei: ꯑꯄꯣꯛꯄ ꯈꯨꯔꯨꯝꯕ, ancestor worship).

=== Traditional Meitei religion ===
Traditional Meitei deities worshipped in Myanmar are Pakhangba, Yumjao Lairembi, Nongpok Ningthou, Panthoibi, Marjing, Thangjing, Leimarel Sidabi, among other. Apokpa Khurumba (or ancestral worship) is practised by offering shareng (fresh water shark, Wallago attu) to the ancestral deities. This is especially common among the Meiteis of the families of the Kakchingtabams (Meitei: ꯀꯛꯆꯤꯡꯇꯥꯕꯝ) and Hajarimayums (Meitei: ꯍꯖꯥꯔꯤꯃꯌꯨꯝ). In older days, there was a tradition of offering shareng fish to Umang Lai (forest deities) and distributing it among people. But this tradition gets extinct.

There is no tradition among Meiteis of Mandalay region for reserving a place inside the south-eastern corner of their houses dedicated to God Sanamahi.

Meiteis, who live along the banks of the Ningthi river, practise the tradition of reserving a place dedicated to God Sanamahi (Meitei: ꯁꯅꯥꯃꯍꯤ) in their houses. They don't have the tradition of domestic poultry because of a belief that if a hen sits on the roof of a house, God Sanamahi will leave their house.

=== Hinduism ===
Hindu deities worshipped by Meiteis in Myanmar are Lord Radha-Krishna, Jaganath, Vishnu, Nityananda, Mahaprabhu, Rama-Sita, Narayana, etc. There are temples of Hindu deities in the Meitei settlements. Religious offering is done once in a week. During the evening prayer sessions, devotees sing devotional songs by beating drums and striking cymbals. For easy memories of those devotional songs, panels are fixed with these songs written inside the pavilions.

=== Buddhism ===
Some Meiteis converted to Buddhism around 1917 due to casteism and discrimination. The 1931 census of Myanmar showed a significant increase of Meitei Buddhist population.

== Culture ==
Historically, most Meiteis of Myanmar worked as cavalry (horsemen), infantry (foot soldiers), indigenous physicians, carpenters, goldsmiths, rowers, weavers, miners of precious stones, fishermen, priests and astrologers, etc. under the patronage of the Myanmar royalty. In modern times, most Meiteis work at trade and commerce. Some Meitei merchants of the Ningthi river basin even came to Manipur during festival times for selling clothes and sweets.

=== Nomenclature ===
Among the Myanmar Meiteis, people use two names. The first name is given by the family, and the second name is in the Myanmar language (Burmese language). The Meitei name is used within the family and among other Meiteis. To get better chances in education and jobs, they must have a name in the Burmese language. Myanmar names do not have surnames. For male elders, 'U' is added before their name. For middle-aged women, 'Daw' is added before their name. Girls add 'Ma' before their names. Meiteis living in Mandalay, Amarapura, and Sagaing know their surnames and family lineage. Some Meiteis living along the Ningthi (Chindwin) river know their surnames and Yek Salai (clan).

=== Clothing ===
Myanmar Meiteis have different ways of clothing. They wear longyi as outdoor clothes. They cover their head with a clothing and a knot is left on the left side. Myanmar Meitei women wear stripped sarong and long sleeved blouses. There is no significant difference between clothing of married and unmarried women. Men wear white pheijom and white armless vests, with a cloth hanging around the neck, during religious or ritualistic or ceremonial events. Women wear pumngou phanek (pale pink sarong) during ceremonial events. This tradition is exceptionally a recent one in Mandalay. There is no tradition of phidon chingkhatpa (wearing sarong over the chest) among married women during religious events. The tradition of phidon chingkhatpa by women is common during bathing.

=== Conversion of mother language and religion ===
Some Meiteis in Myanmar, especially in Ahneiktaw, made friends with people from other communities. They were shunned for visiting their traditional temples, meaning they were treated as untouchables and not allowed to join in. Even their relatives were affected. Because of fear, shame, and sadness, they converted to Buddhism, a religion of the majorities. After that, they started mixing with Buddhists. This led to them forgetting their mother tongue. Over time, these Meiteis became part of the Myanmar social system. Today, they have forgotten that their ancestors were Meiteis.

== Influence on Burmese ==
The Meiteis introduced polo (Meitei: Sagol Kangjei) and foot hockey (Meitei: Khong Kangjei) in the Burmese court. They introduced astrology to the Burmese and the rest of the South East Asians.

When Burmese King Alaungpaya invaded Siam (Thailand), he had 500 Manipuri (Meitei) horsemen with him. Meitei Brahmins worked as astrologers and priests for the Burmese royalties.

== Unmarried people and population decline ==
In every Meitei household, there are unmarried men and women aged 30 to 84. Boys and girls stay unmarried because they can't find suitable partners, face discrimination, or deal with caste issues. They could marry Myanmar people but prefer to stay Meitei. Some girls stay unmarried because they have to take care of their parents. If someone marries a Myanmar girl because they can't find a Meitei girl, they often face social rejection. Staying unmarried is one reason for the declining population. Meiteis living by the Ningthi river can marry brides from other communities if they convert to Hinduism, as they can't find suitable brides within their own community. There are more unmarried women than men among the Meiteis.

== Groups ==
- Meithei/Kathe Ethnic Literature and Culture Association, a working organization in Mandalay
- United Meitei Language and Cultural Group was established in Mandalay on 1 December 1997.

== Notable people ==
- Chakpa Makhao Ngambi

== See also ==
- Meitei language in Assam
- Meitei language in Bangladesh
- Meitei language in Tripura

== Bibliography ==
- Wolleng, Angelee. The Politics of Identity and Settlement of Manipuri in Myanmar. India: Ruby Press & Company, 2017.
- Manipuri (Metei Kathe) Settlements in Myanmar. India: EBH Publishers, 2023.
- Khundrakpam, Padmabati. Experiences of Manipur and Indo-Myanmar Border Trade: A Relook. India: Akansha Publishing House, 2016.
- Bahadur, Mutua. Kate: Myanmarese Meetei/Meitei. India: Mutua Museum, 2017.
- Social Transformations in India, Myanmar, and Thailand: Volume II: Identity and Grassroots for Democratic Progress. Singapore: Palgrave Macmillan US, 2022.
- Bahadur, Mutua. The Art of Bamboo: Bamboo in Manipuri Cultural Life India, Bangladesh and Myanmar : Cane and Bamboo Craft of NE India, Bangladesh, Myanmar and Thailand. India: Mutua Museum, 2013.
- Manipur, Past and Present: The Heritage and Ordeals of a Civilization. India: Mittal Publications, 1988.
