= Gurumayum Gourakishor Sharma =

Indian martial art exponent

Gurumayum Gourakishor Sharma is an exponent and teacher of thang-ta.

In 2009, he received the high Padma Shri honor award from the Indian Government for his contributions to the preservation and advancement of thang-ta.

== See also ==
- Thang-Ta
- Indian martial arts
- Mukna
- Sarit Sarak
- Banshay
