= Huiyen Lallong =

Traditional Meitei martial art form

- Meitei: ꯍꯨꯢꯌꯦꯟ ꯂꯥꯂꯣꯡ
- Also known as: Huiyen Lalong; Huiyen Lallon; Huiyen Lalon; Huiyen Lanlon; Huiyen Langlon; Huiyen Langlong; Huyen Lallong; Huyen Lalong; Huyen Lallon; Huyen Lalon; Huyen Lanlon; Huyen Langlon; Huyen Langlong
- Country of origin: India
- Creator: Nongda Lairen Pakhangba (according to Meitei tradition)
- Olympic sport: No

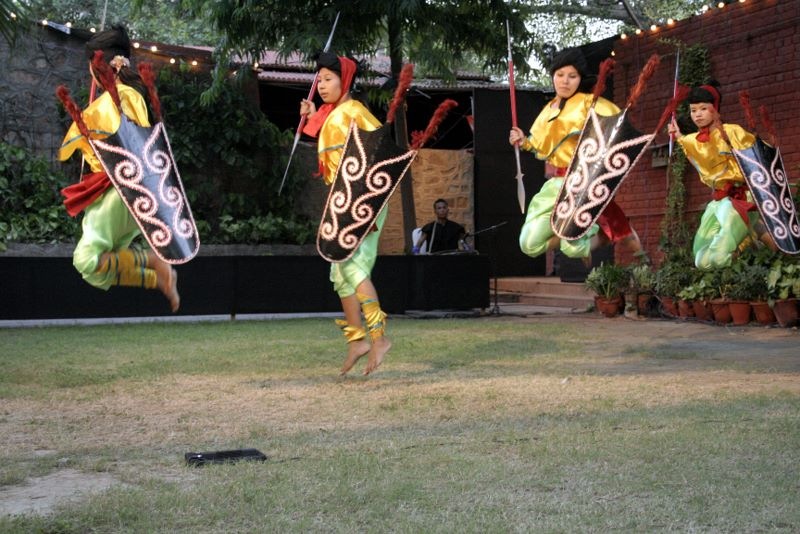
Thang-ta

Huiyen Lallong is a classical Meitei traditional martial art form. It is one of the Indian martial arts, originating from Manipur. consists of two main subforms: Thang-Ta (armed combat) and Sarit Sarak (unarmed fighting). It is one of Meitei intangible cultural heritage. Huiyen Lallong, along with the fusion of three other performing art forms, Lai Haraoba, Meitei Nata Sankirtana and Raaslila, gave rise to the Sangeet Natak Akademi-recognised Indian classical dance form, popularly known as the "Manipuri dance".

== Etymology ==
In the Meitei language, Huiyen means war while Lallong or Lanlong can mean net, knowledge or art.

== Weapons and techniques ==
The primary weapons of Huiyen Lallong are the Thang (sword) and Ta (spear). The spear can be used in its non-missile form while up close, or thrown from afar. Other weapons include the shield and the axe. Unarmed combat incorporates hand strikes, kicks, and grappling (Mukna).

== Overview ==
The Thang-Ta aspect of huyen langlon can be practiced in three ways: ritual, demonstration, and combat. The first way is related to tantric practices and is entirely ritualistic in nature. The second way consists of a spectacular performance involving sword and spear dances. These routines can be converted into actual fighting practices. The third way is the true combat application.

Thang-Ta shares a connection with certain war-dances, often blurring the line between dance and combat forms, such as Thang-hairol (sword dance) and Khousarol (spear dance). Many ritualistic dances in Manipur were traditionally performed by martial artists such as the spear dance for funerals or the sacred Thenkou dance. The sword movements in dance are meant to either symbolize protection or to ward off evil spirits. As a result, it is part of the Manipuri classical dance.

== History ==
All that can be gleaned of huyen langlon's ancient history comes from hymns and legends. Folklore links the creation of huyen langlon and its related dances with the native animist gods. Manipur was a valley protected from neighbouring Hindu, Burmese and Chinese kingdoms by hills. The valley people were divided into seven related clans, known as yek, salai, or pana. These were the Mangang, Luwang, Khuman, Angom, Moirang, Khaba-Nganba and Sarang Leishangthem. Before their integration into a single unified Meitei community, these clans each ruled separate principalities over which they fought amongst each other.

The earliest written record of huyen langlon come from the Puya or written records handed down to posterity by the forefathers of the Meiteis, which record the history of the Manipur royalty in archaic Meitei script. The Chainarol-Puya details the ethics of duelling. The fights took place under strict rules of conduct and to violate them was shameful and sinful. When a fighter is challenged, the day for the bout is fixed to allow for time to prepare the weapons. Allowing the opponent the first chance to fire an arrow or hurl a spear was considered particularly courageous. The duel itself was not necessarily to the death and usually ended once first blood has been drawn. However, the victor was expected to behead the loser. Either before the duel or before the beheading, the fighters would share the meals and wine prepared by their wives. If it had been so requested beforehand, the loser's body may be cremated. Heads were taken as trophies, as was custom among the headhunters of northeast India. Taboos existed such as not killing an opponent who runs, begs or cries out of fear, or anyone who pleads for protection.

Until this point, most of the fighters were commoners who also served as warriors. Loiyamba Shinyen (1074-1122 AD) introduced an armed force or lallup, while King Punshiba (1404-1432 AD) created a permanent military department known as Shingchep Meira Haijouroi, paving the way for the conqueror kings of the 15th century. The warrior queen Linthoingambi successfully defeated raiding Tangkhul tribesmen while the king was absent. Her husband Meidingu Ningthou Khomba took advantage of his highly trained warriors and expanded the kingdom's territory. Their son Meidingu Senbi Kiyamba, an expert with the spear, eventually went on to conquer the Shan kingdom of Kyang.

Meidingu Pamheiba (1709-1748 AD) is regarded as one of Manipur's greatest kings. He upgraded the lallup system, making it the duty of every male above 16 to serve the state for 10 in 40 days. Therefore each person served the state some 90 days in a year, with martial arts as part of their training. Thus Manipur had no true standing army and relied on its individual warriors for protection. Pamheiba's development of the military paid off. His warriors fought Tripura and the Burmese kingdom of Awa, expanding Meitei rule as far as Cachar. Conflict with the Burmese continued through the 18th and 19th centuries, culminating in the Chahi-Taret Khuntakpa or Seven Years Devastation. As muskets were not widely available, swords and spears remained the primary weapons of both the Burmese and Meitei armies.

From 1891 to 1947 British colonists prohibited martial arts, the possession of weapons, duels to the death, and other violent customs among India's indigenous populations. The ban was somewhat difficult to enforce due to the region's isolation. The neighbouring Naga people in particular have practiced headhunting in living memory. Nevertheless, modernization and adoption of Christianity killed off much of the native culture, particularly after the second World War. The meditative practices of huyen langlon were nearly lost before India achieved independence. Today it is the most popular of Meitei martial arts, practiced by men and women. It is most often seen through demonstrations in cultural programs.

In recent years huyen langlon has been promoted as a sport all over India and as a self-defence tactical subject. Competitions are held yearly at school, district, state and national level. The promotion of huyen langlon as a sport helped in the cause of its promotion and spread from Manipur to the whole of India, particularly Jammu and Kashmir. Manipur and Jammu & Kashmir are the strongest contenders at the national level. In 2009 Gurumayum Gourakishor Sharma, a leading exponent and teacher of huyen langlon, received the high Padma Shri award from the Indian Government for his contributions to the preservation and advancement of the art.

The biggest training school is the Huyen Langlon Thang-Ta Academy which holds demonstrations at cultural shows.

== Training ==
As in all Indian martial arts, training begins with stepping patterns and then basic sword strikes. The main sword stance is the lion posture, in which the body leans forward with one leg stretched back and the other bent forward. The feet are about shoulder-width apart and form a 45-degree angle. This stance emphasises phidup or a coil, enabling a springing action. At higher levels, exponents slice pieces of watermelons on a person's body without causing any injury. This is eventually done blindfolded.

Spear technique is considered more difficult and is taught after the sword. The spear emphasizes phanba, an opening out of the body with two forms: nongphan to simulate the expanse of the sky and leiphal emulating the expanse of the ground. Generally speaking, the spear demands more of the lower body while the sword uses more of the upper body. Bare-handed techniques (sarit sarak or sharit sharak) are only taught when a student has gained competence in armed fighting. The physical side of thang-ta is eventually supplemented with breathing exercises (ningsha kanglon), traditional medicine (layeng kanglon), meditation (hirikonba), and the sacred dances (thengouron).

Sparring matches are conducted in a 30-foot circular arena. There are two methods of sparring: phunaba ama and phunaba anishuba. In phunaba ama, competitors wield a two-foot leather-encased cheibi (cudgel) paired with a leather chungoi (shield) measuring one feet in diameter. One match consists of two three-minute rounds with one minute of rest in between. One central referee, six scorers, one time keeper and either one or two chief judges are assigned for one match. The other form of sparring, phunaba anishuba, is identical with the exception that kicks are allowed and there are no shields. These forms of sparring in which cudgels or cheibi simulate swords are referred to as cheibi chainaba (clash of cheibi).

== See also ==
- Gad-Ga
- Gatka
- Bando
