= Sarit Sarak =

Classical Meitei martial art

- (Meitei: ꯁꯔꯤꯠ ꯁꯔꯥꯛ)
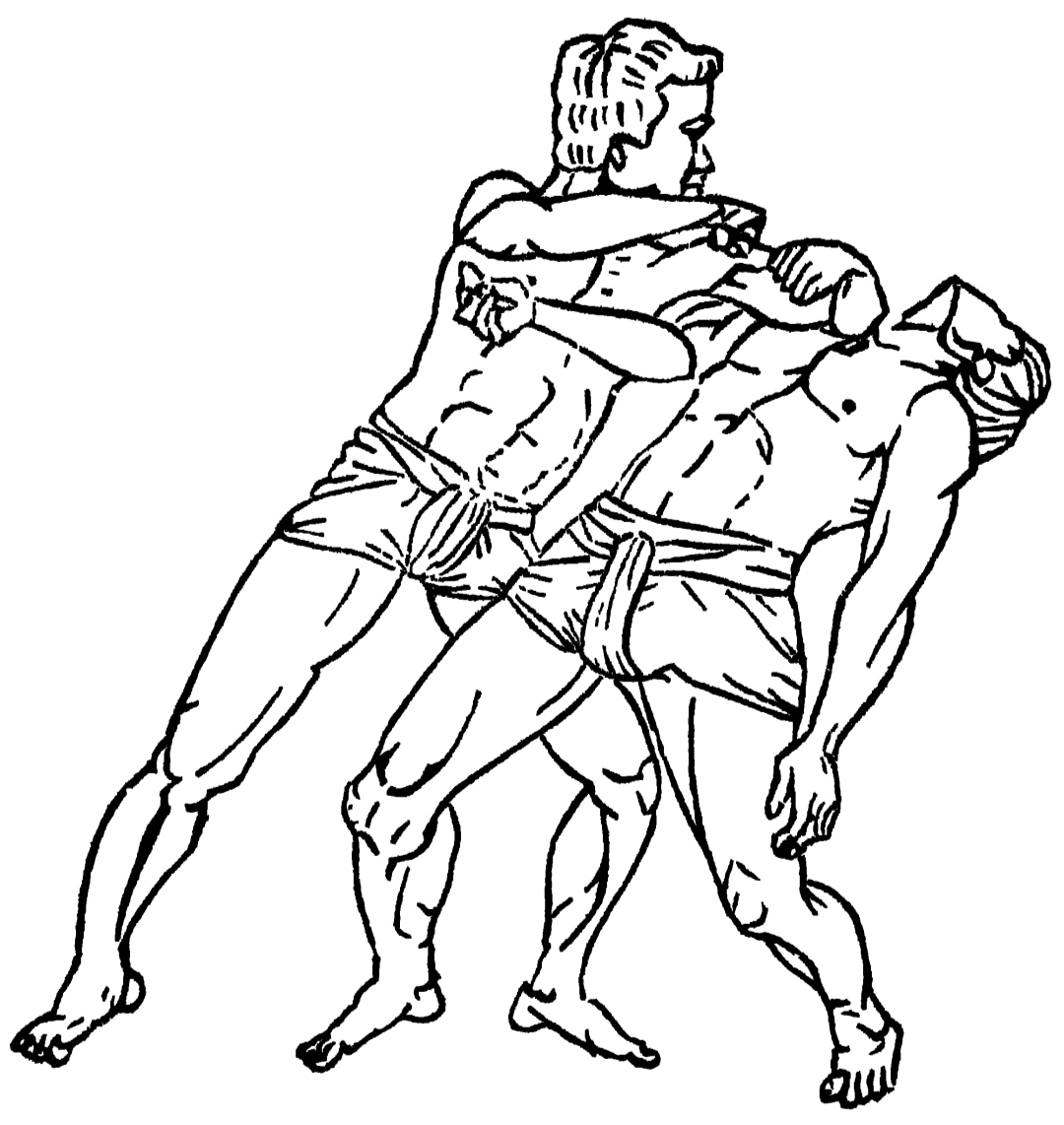
- A step of Sarit Sarak (Sharit Sharak), the weaponless martial art form
- Also known as: Sarit Sarak (Old Manipuri: Salit Salak) or Sharit Sharak (Old Manipuri: Shalit Shalak)
- Focus: weaponless combat
- Country of origin: India
- Creator: Pakhangba (according to Meitei mythology)
- Parenthood: Meitei culture
- Related arts: Thang Ta
- Meaning: #Word origin
- Martial art: yes

Sarit Sarak (Old Manipuri: Salit Salak) or Sharit Sharak (Old Manipuri: Shalit Shalak) is a classical Meitei traditional martial art form. It is originated from the Ancient Kangleipak (present day Manipur state). It is practised without using any weaponry. It is also defined as "hand to hand combat." It is considered as the sibling of Thang Ta, which uses weapons.

Sarit-Sarak is a form of unarmed combat that includes techniques like Khutlon (hand and arm movements) and Khonglon (foot and leg movements). These techniques help improve strength, agility, and self-defense skills without using weapons.

It is a unique style of unarmed combat that stands out from other martial arts. It is perfect in both avoiding attacks and launching its own, making it superior to other martial arts in the same category.

In ancient times, Sarit-Sarak was an important part of Meitei society, helping warriors stay strong and ready, even without weapons. It taught important skills like offense, self-defense, and planning. Sharing the lessons from Sarit-Sarak with the current generation keep these traditions alive and improve physical and mental strength.

== Etymology ==
The term "Sarit-Sarak" is derived from two Meitei language words: "Sha-lit" and "Sha-lak." "Sha-lit" refers to escaping from an animal, while "Sha-lak" means taming the animal. The combination of these words reflects the system’s focus on both evading attacks and controlling or neutralizing threats, similar to how one would escape from or tame a wild animal.

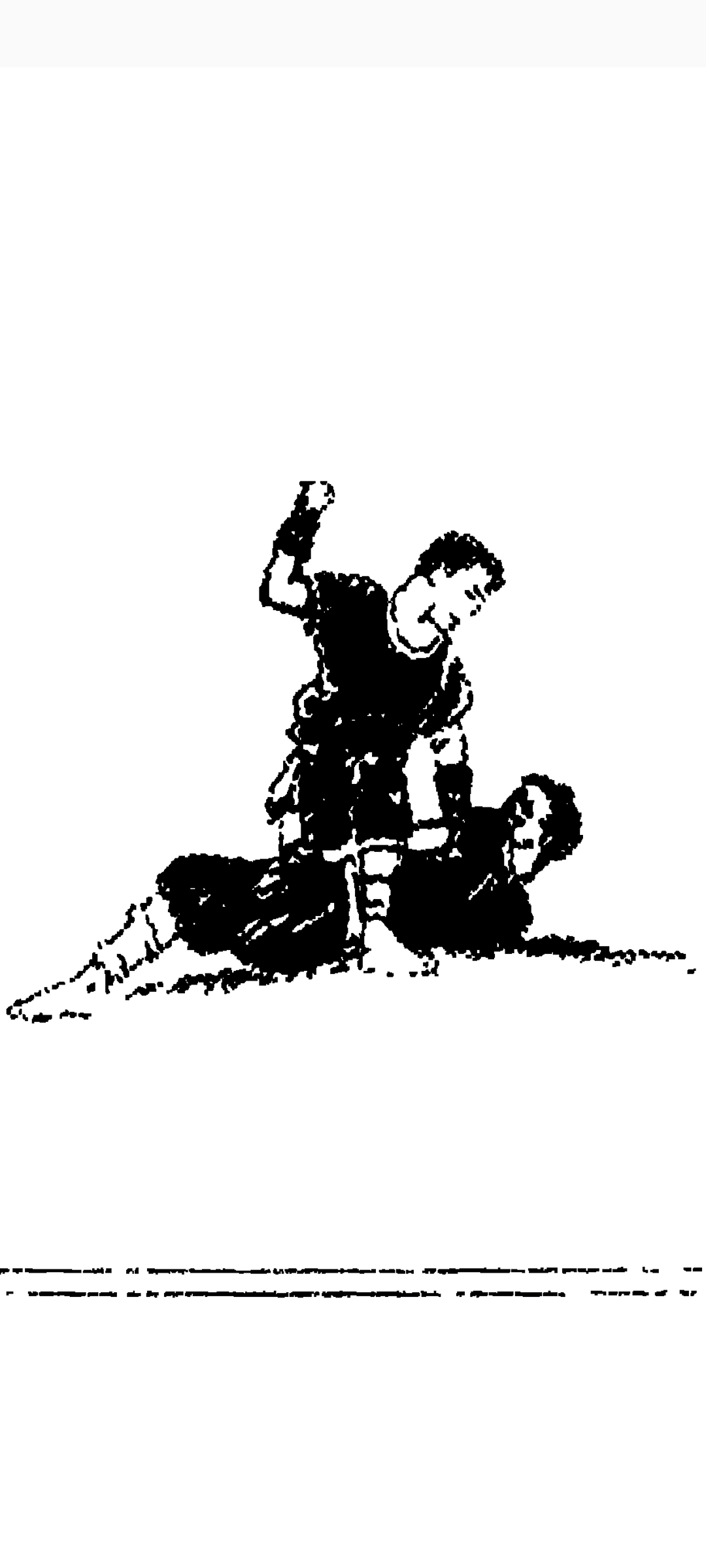
Sarit Sarak Sarat - Ancient Meitei classical martial art (weaponless)

== Associations and organizations ==
=== National level in New Delhi ===
The Sarit-Sarak Federation of India, in collaboration with the Sarit-Sarak Association of New Delhi, organized the First National Sarit-Sarak Championship at the Akhil Bharat Hindu Maha Sabha Auditorium in 2024. The championship featured two events: Ahanba Chainaba and Anishuba Chainaba.

The competition was held with participation from 20 teams across states such as Manipur, Assam, Nagaland, Tripura, Uttar Pradesh, Delhi, Punjab, Haryana, Jammu & Kashmir, Gujarat, Rajasthan, Maharashtra, Madhya Pradesh, Karnataka, Andhra Pradesh, Jharkhand, Uttarakhand, Chhattisgarh, Telangana, and Tamil Nadu.

=== Manipur ===
The Sarit-Sarak Association of Manipur organizes state-level trials to select teams for the Sarit-Sarak Federation Cup, an annual event held under the Sarit-Sarak Swadeshi Martial Arts Sports Association, Maharashtra. The competition typically takes place in October, with the trials held in advance to select athletes from affiliated units. The events are hosted in various locations, including venues like the Rajiv Gandhi Indoor Stadium in Solapur.

=== Jammu & Kashmir ===
The J&K Sarit Association took part in the first Sarit Sarak Federation Cup, held in Solapur, Maharashtra, from December 21–23 of 2024. The tournament had teams from 16 states across India. The J&K team performed well, finishing in fourth place and winning 18 medals.

== Gallery ==
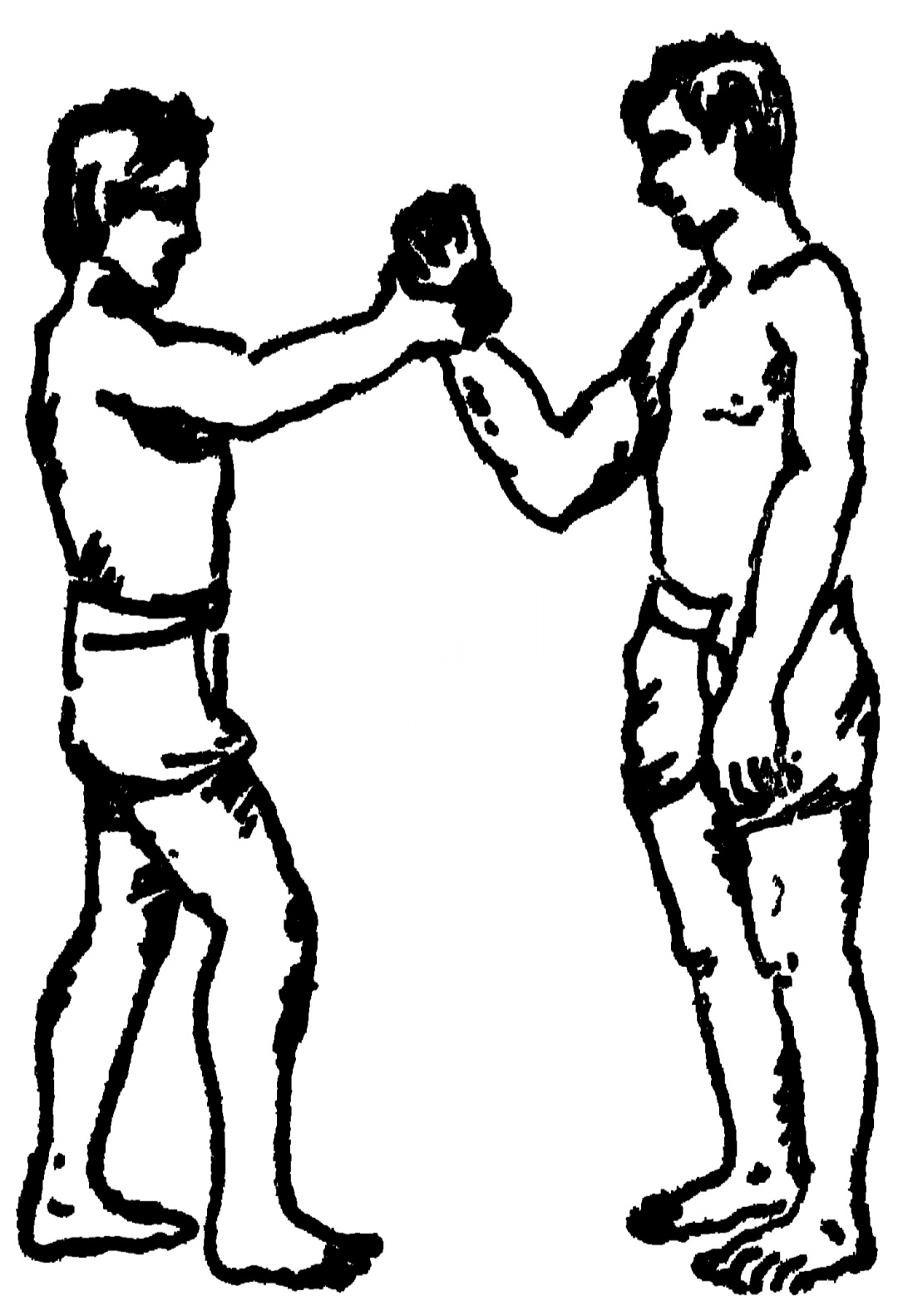

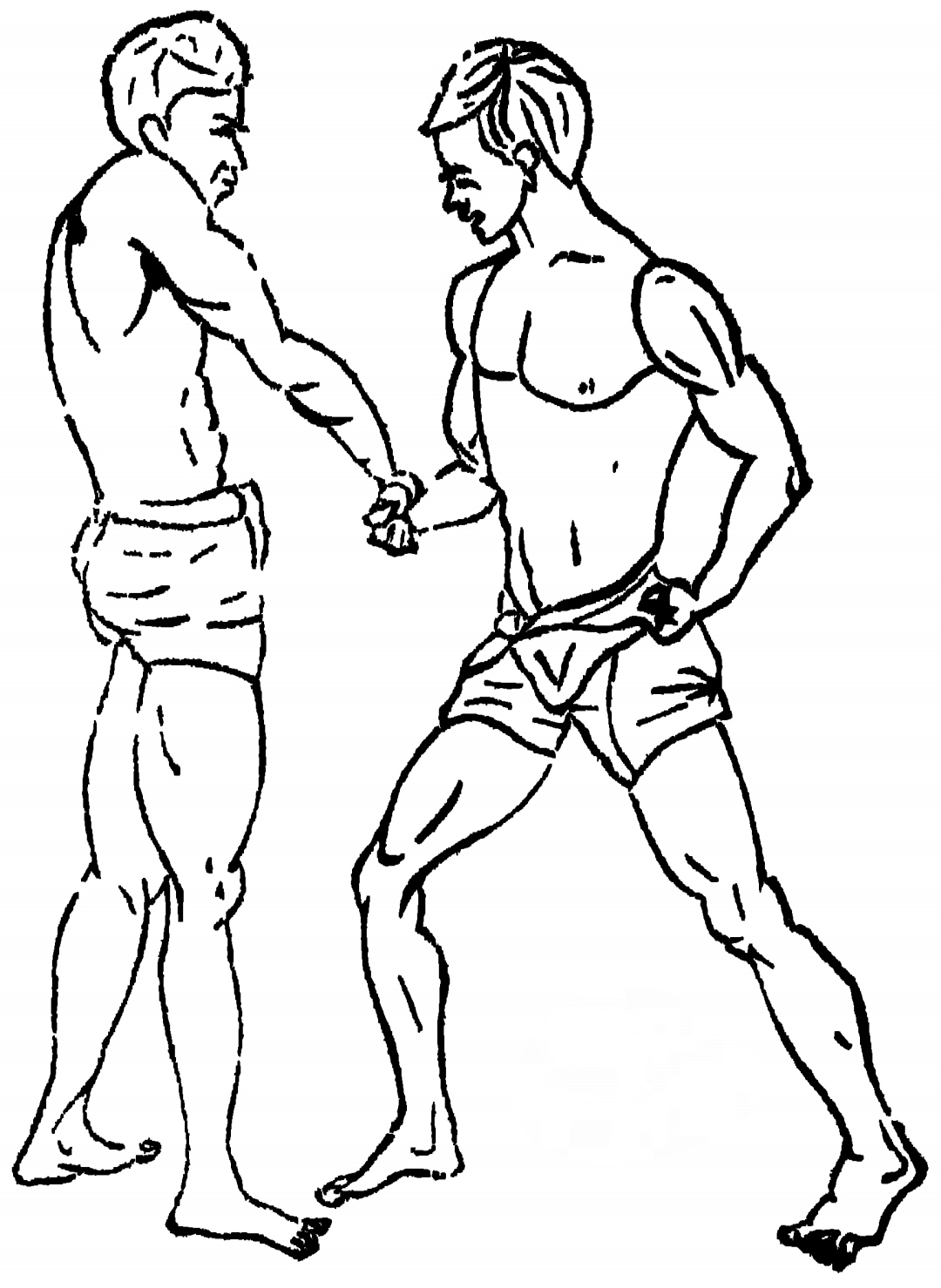

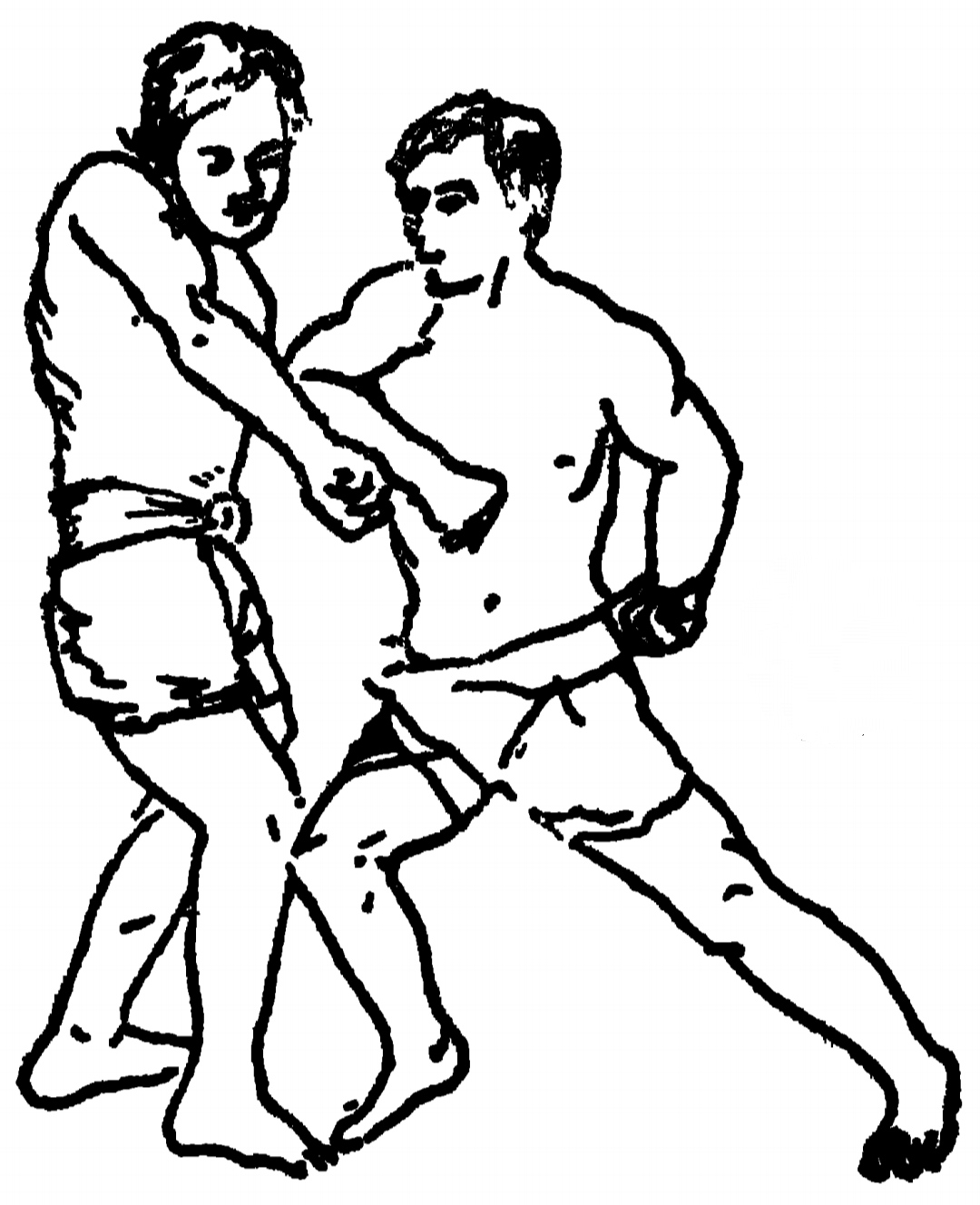

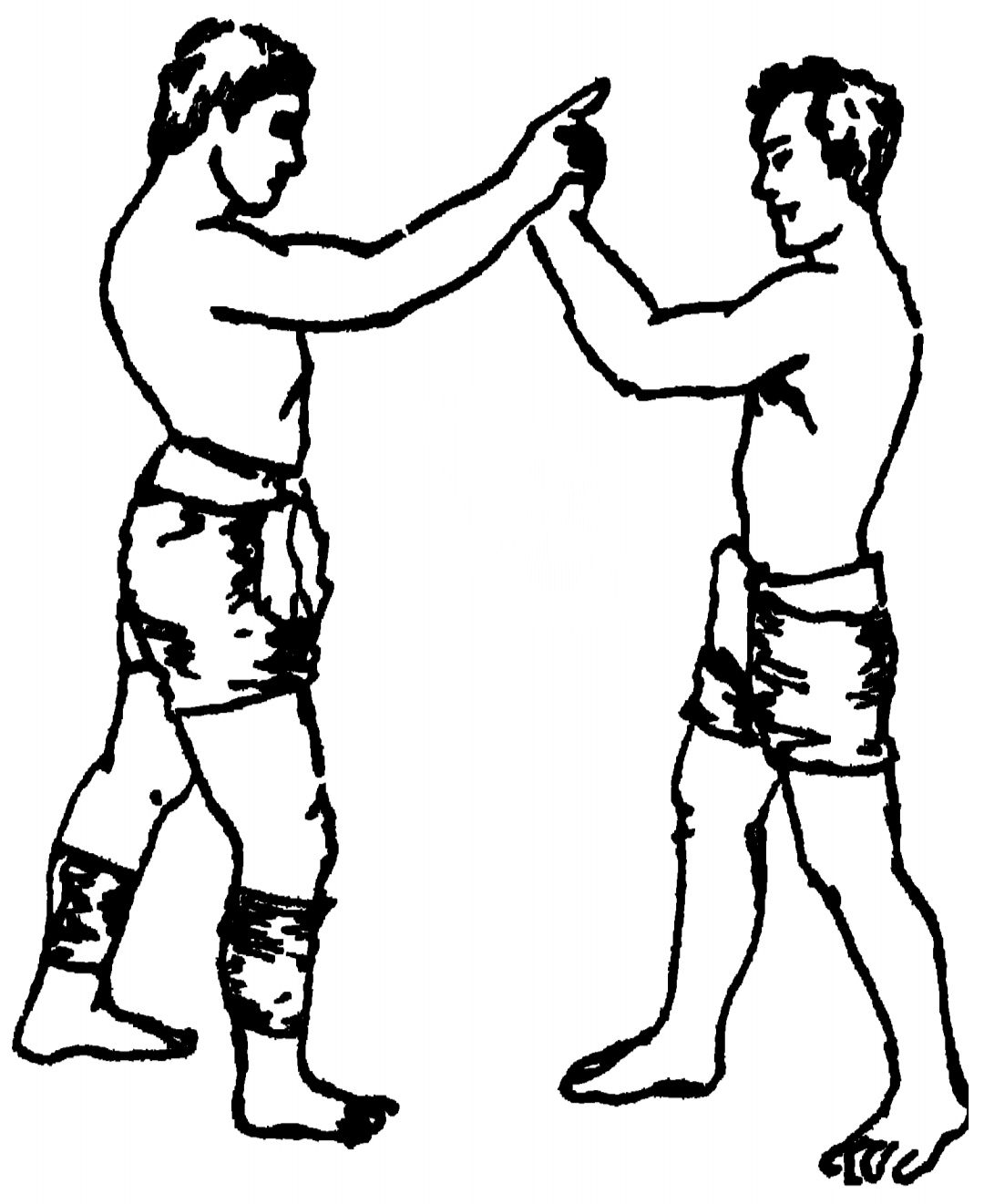

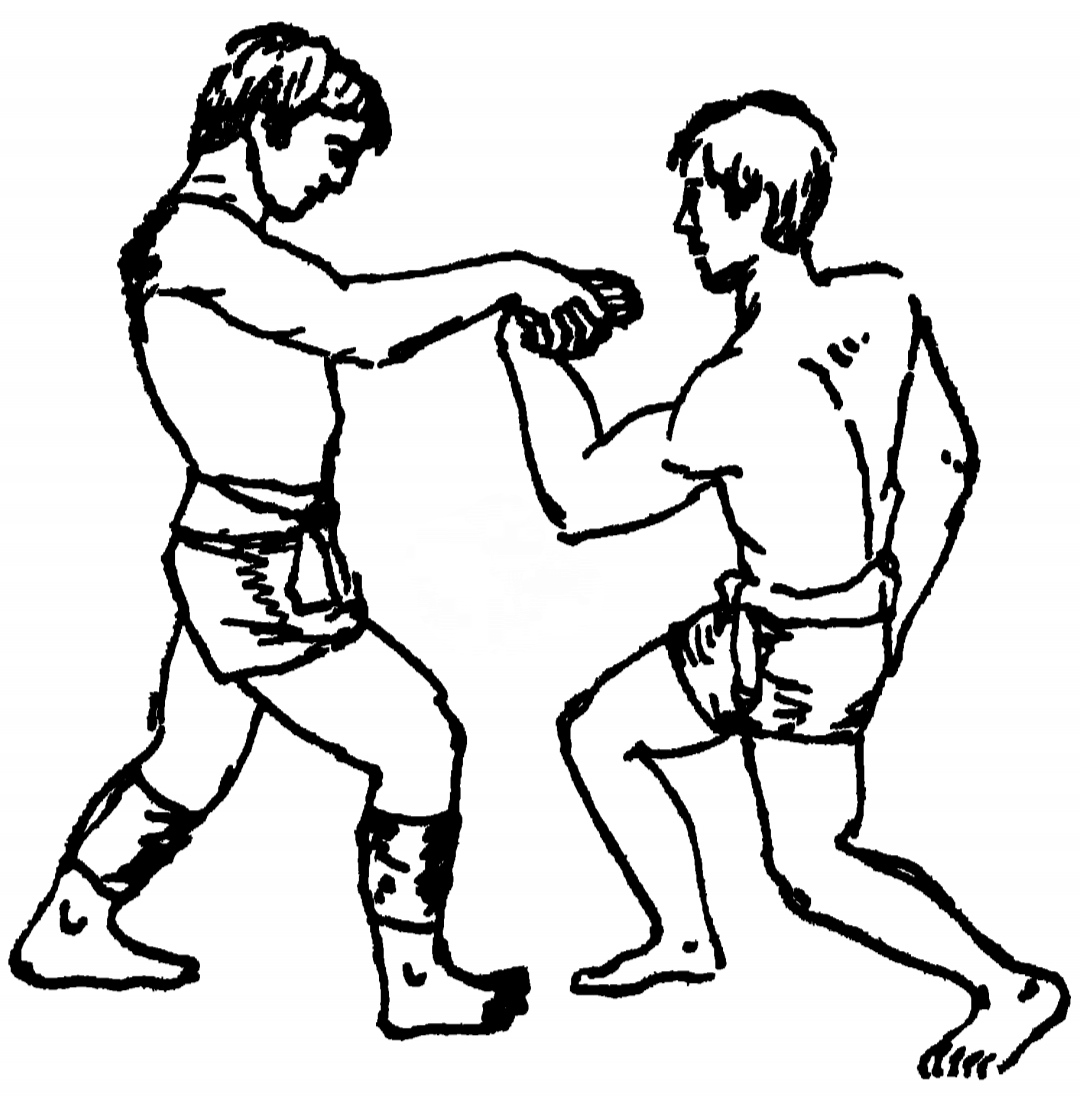

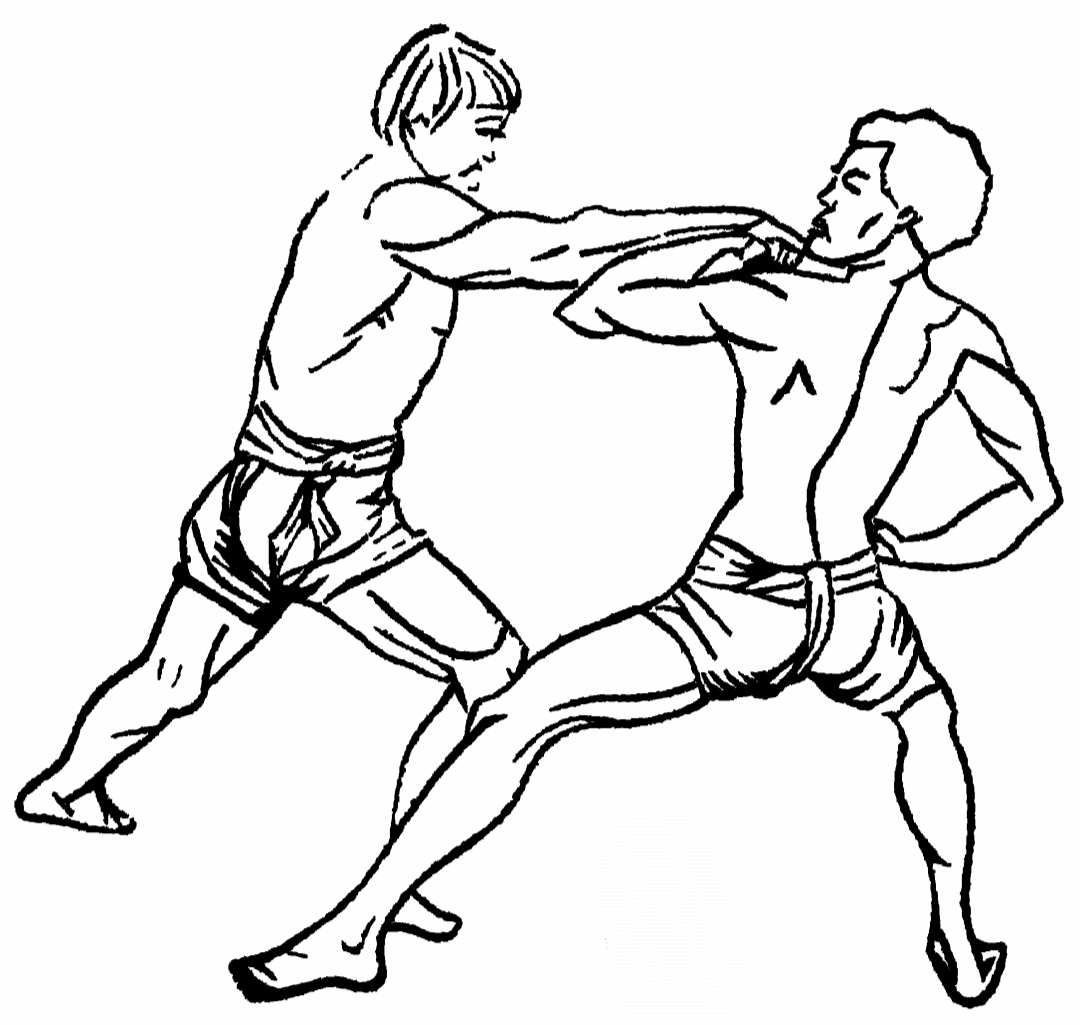

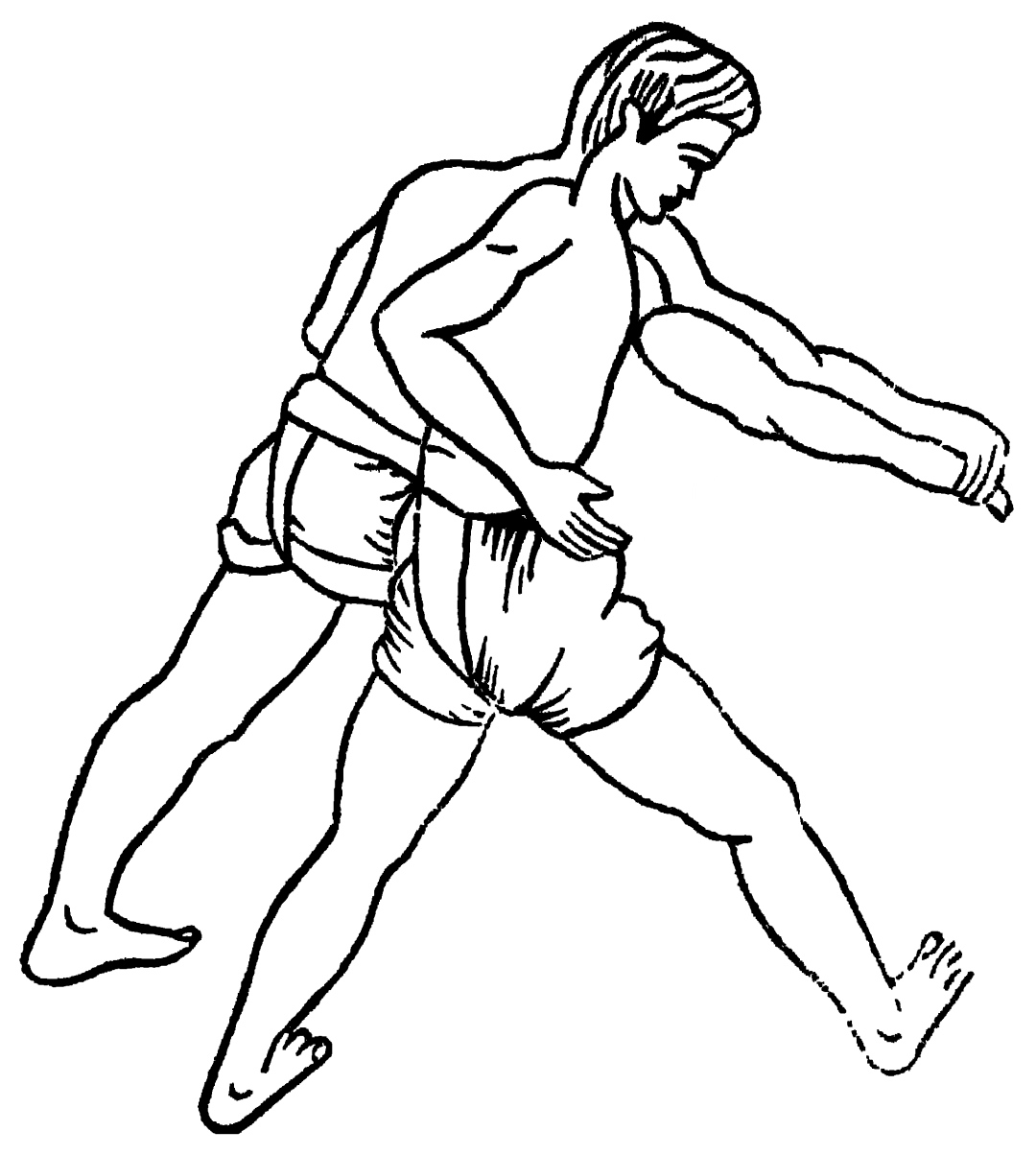

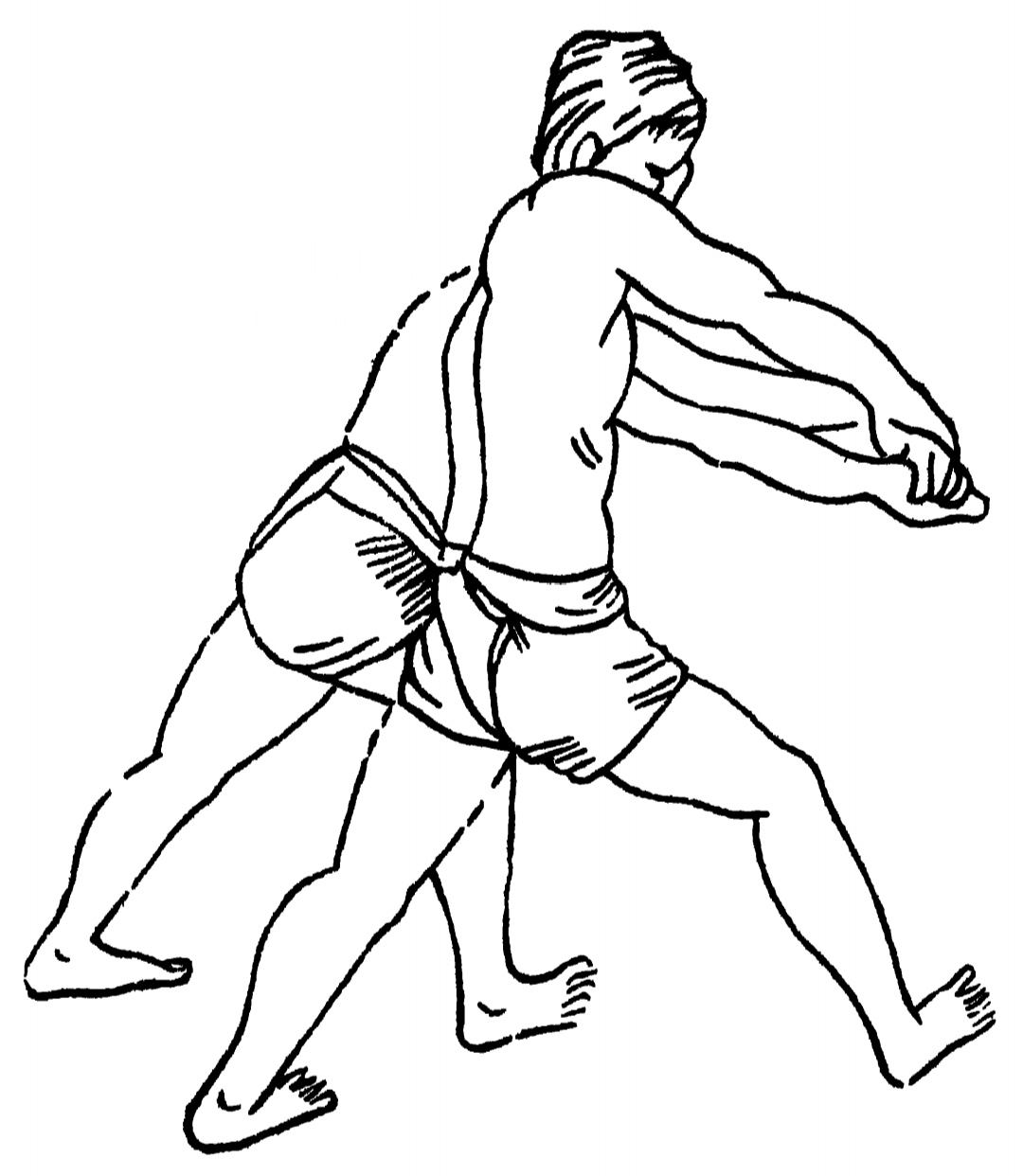

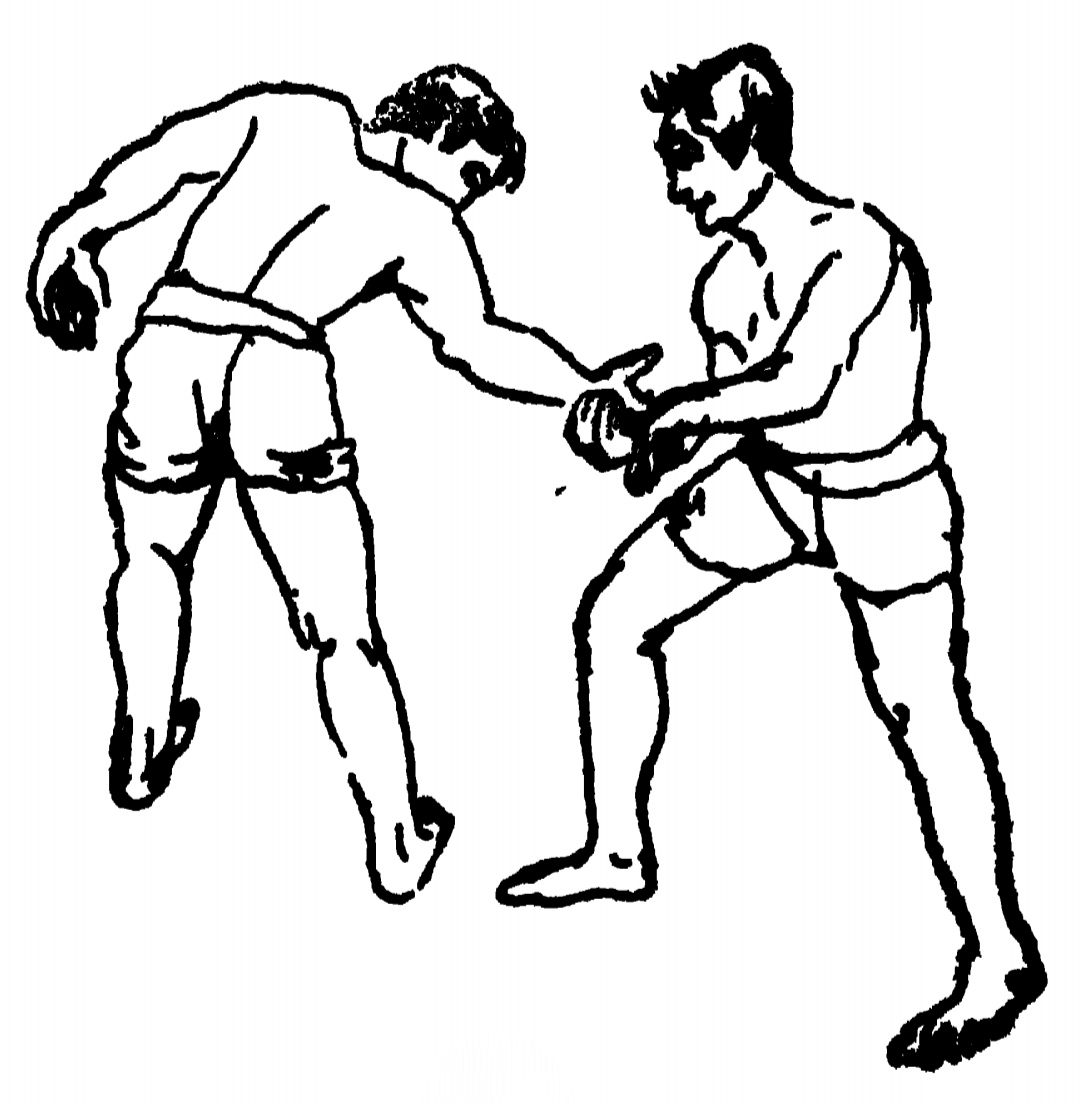

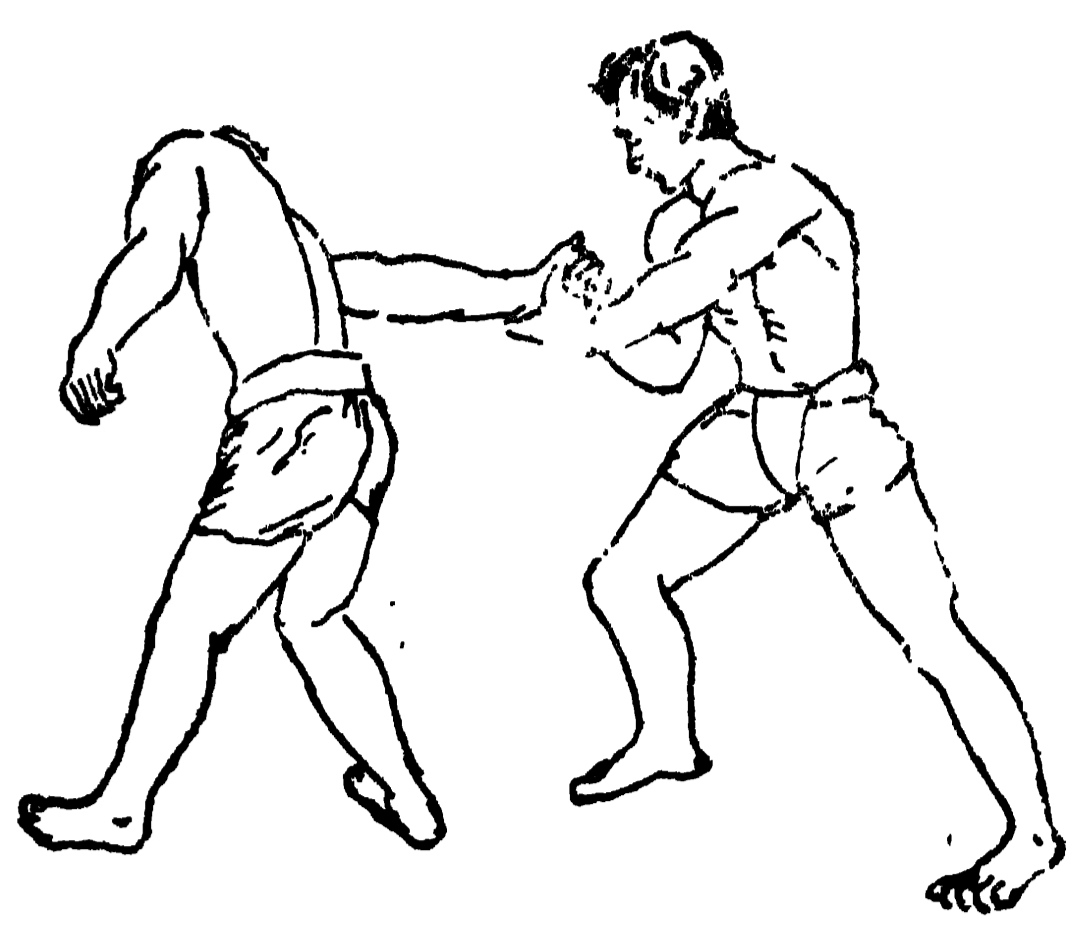

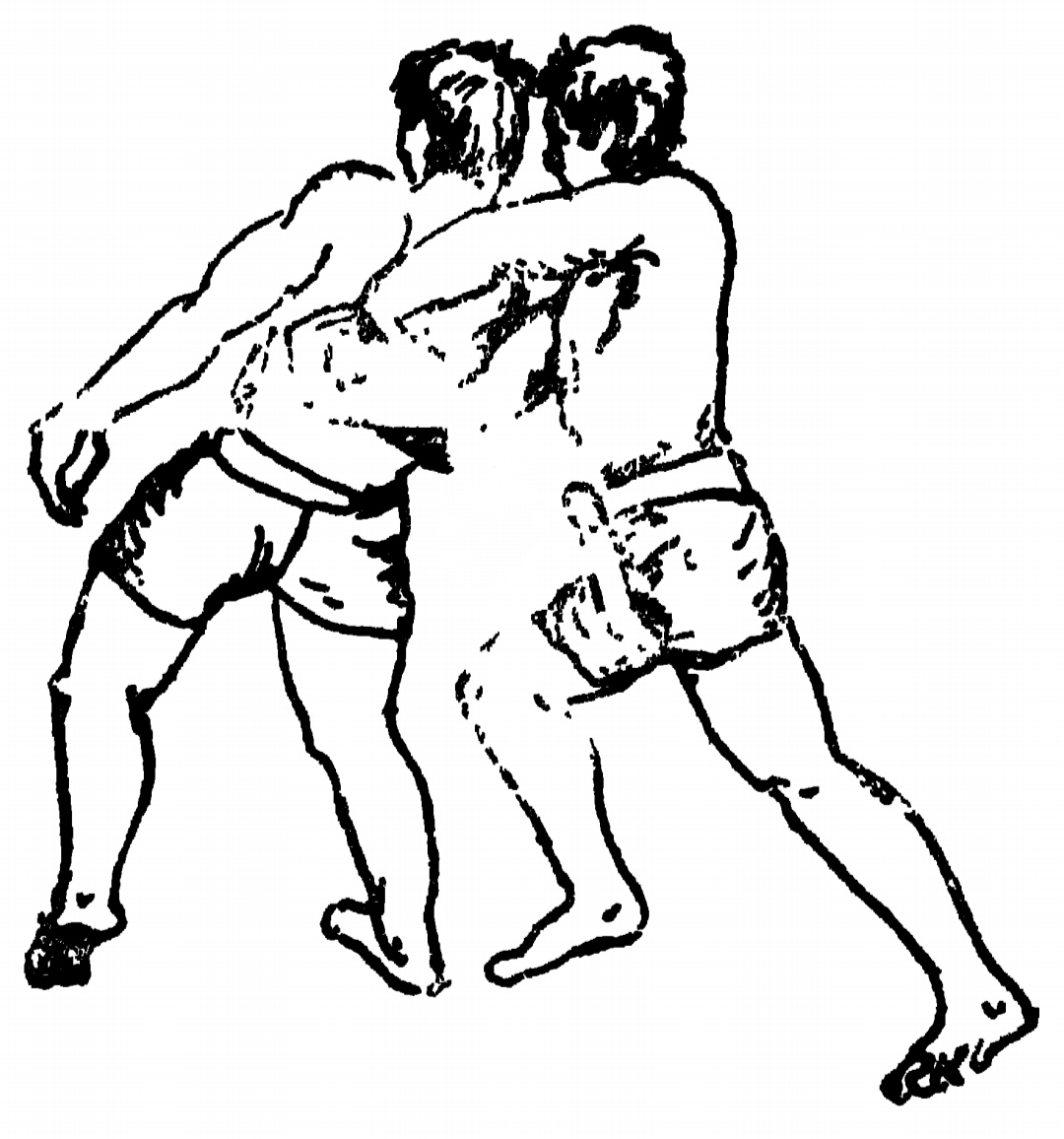

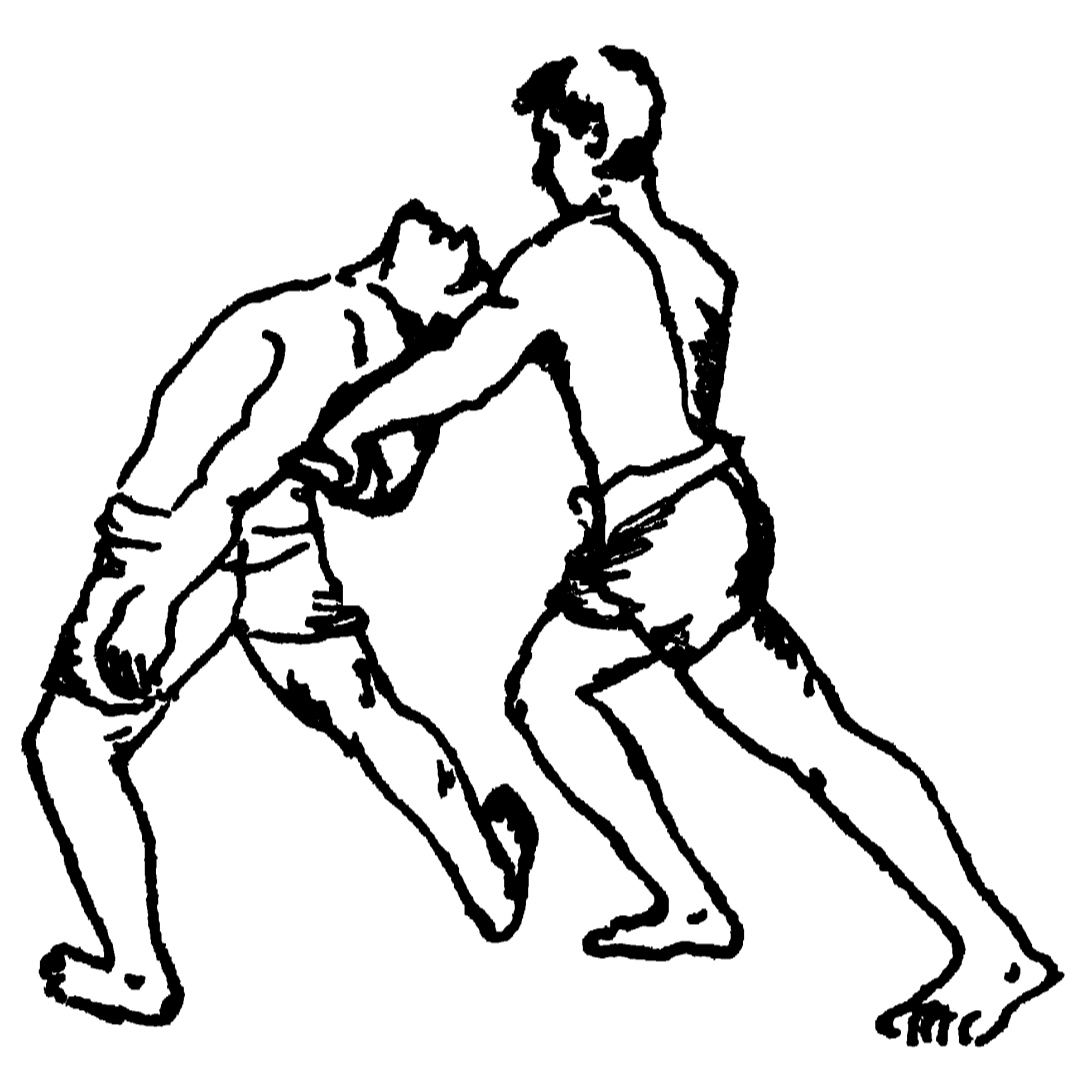

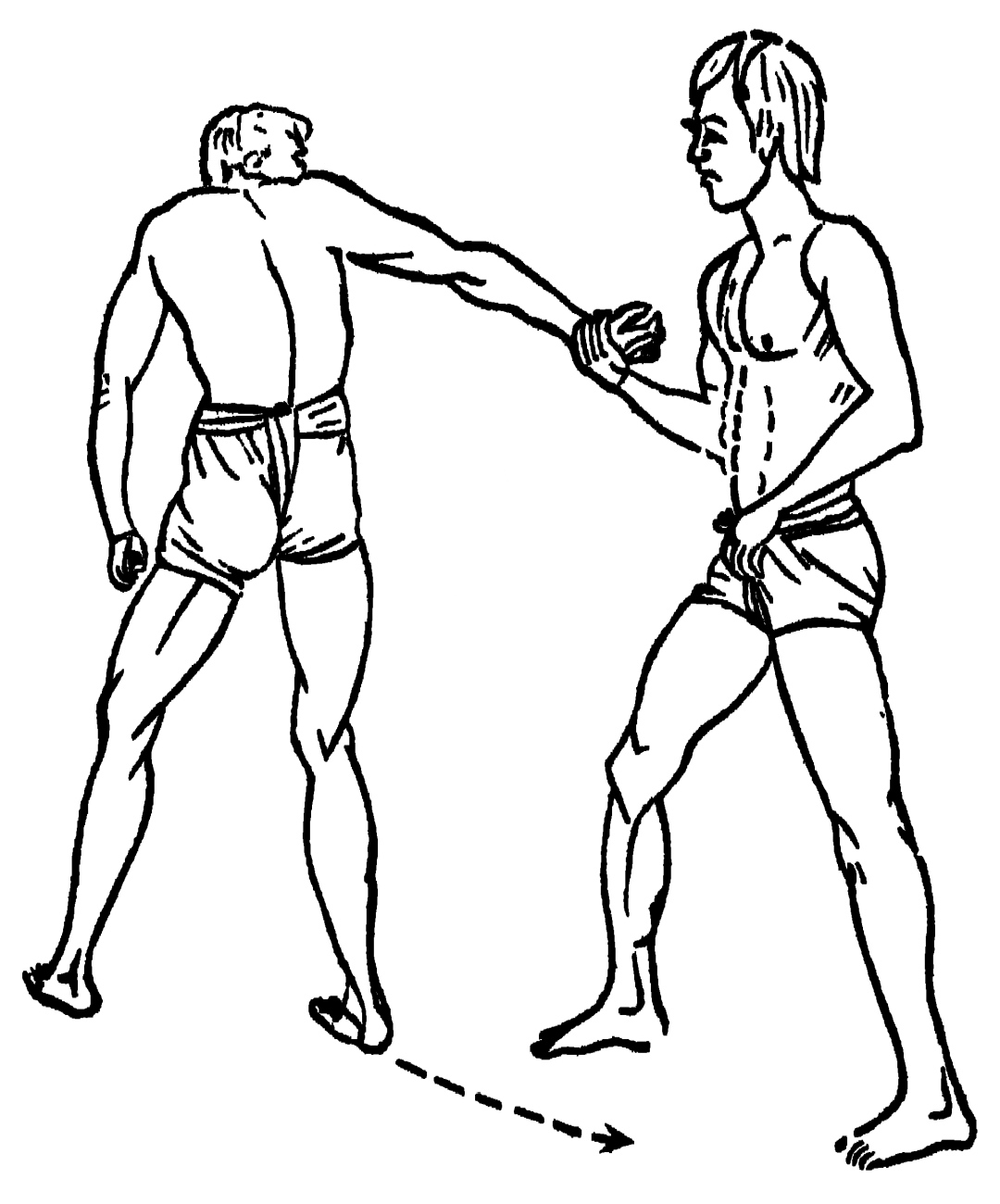

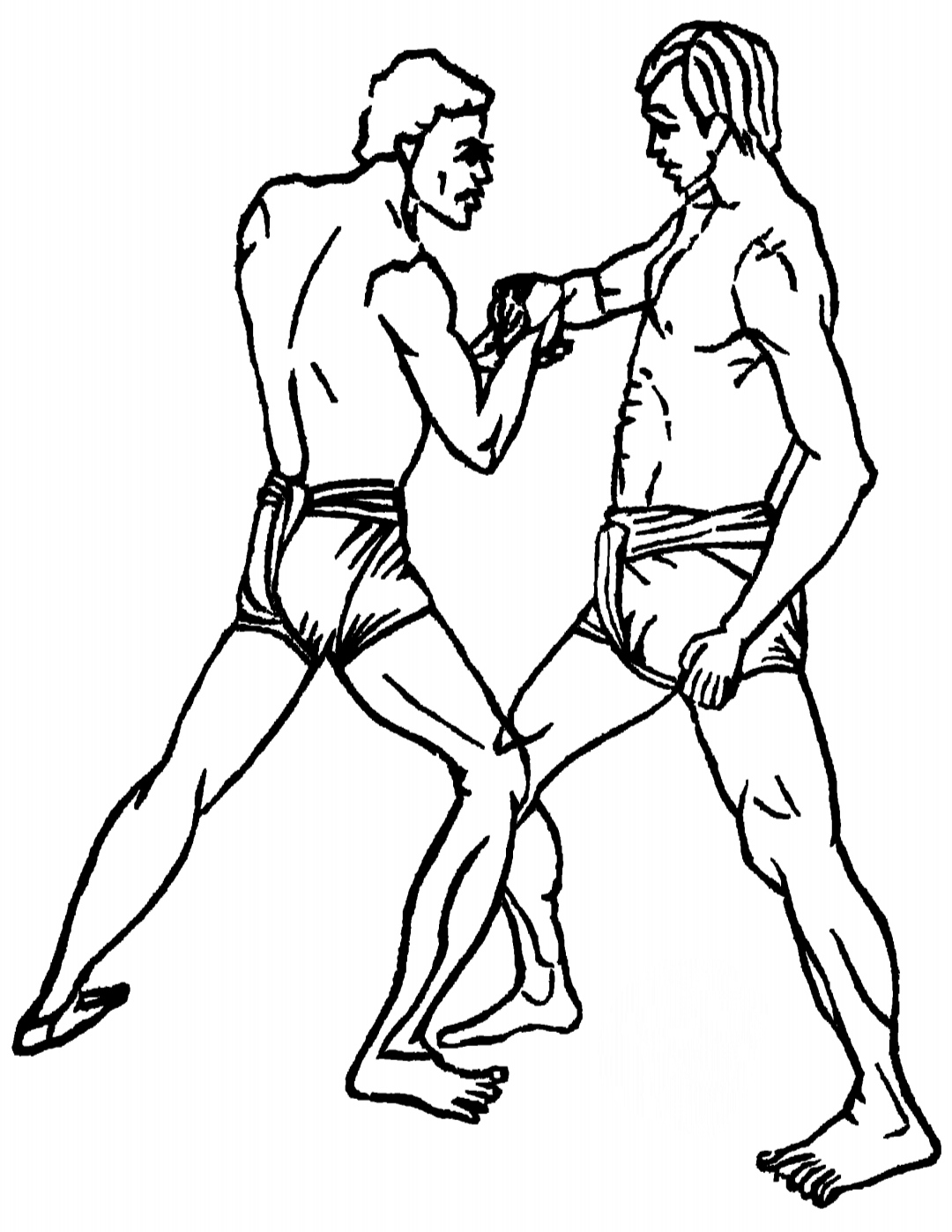

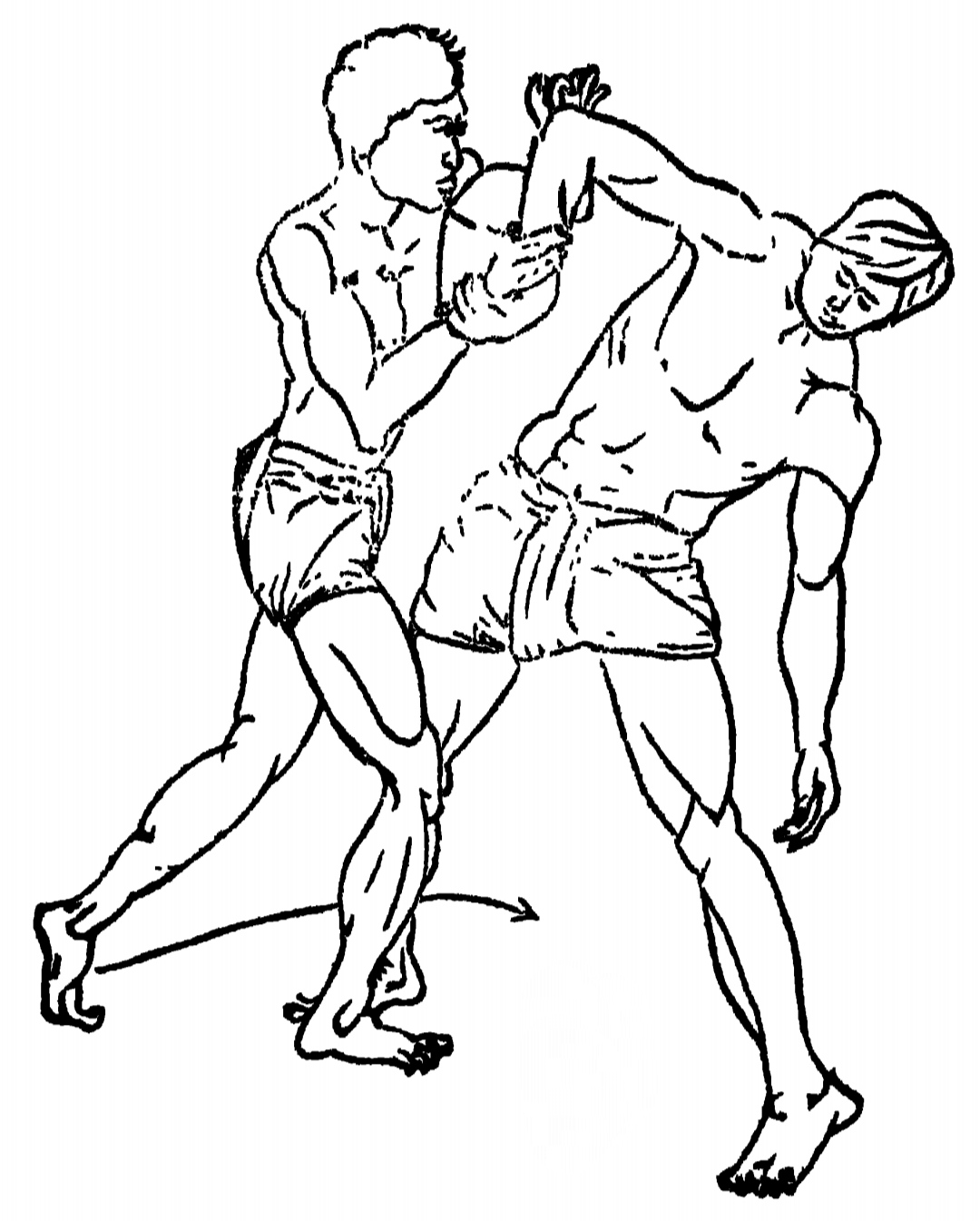

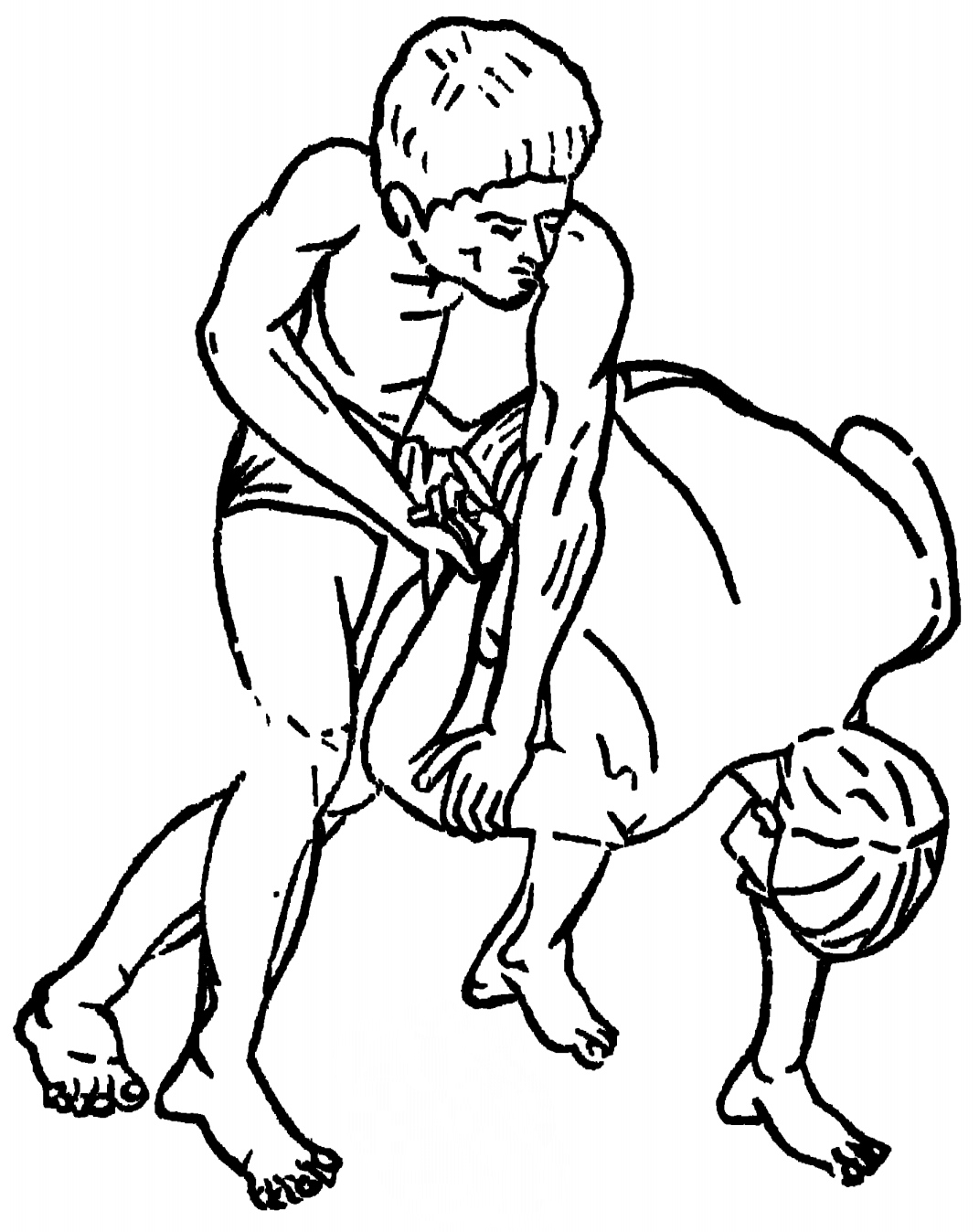

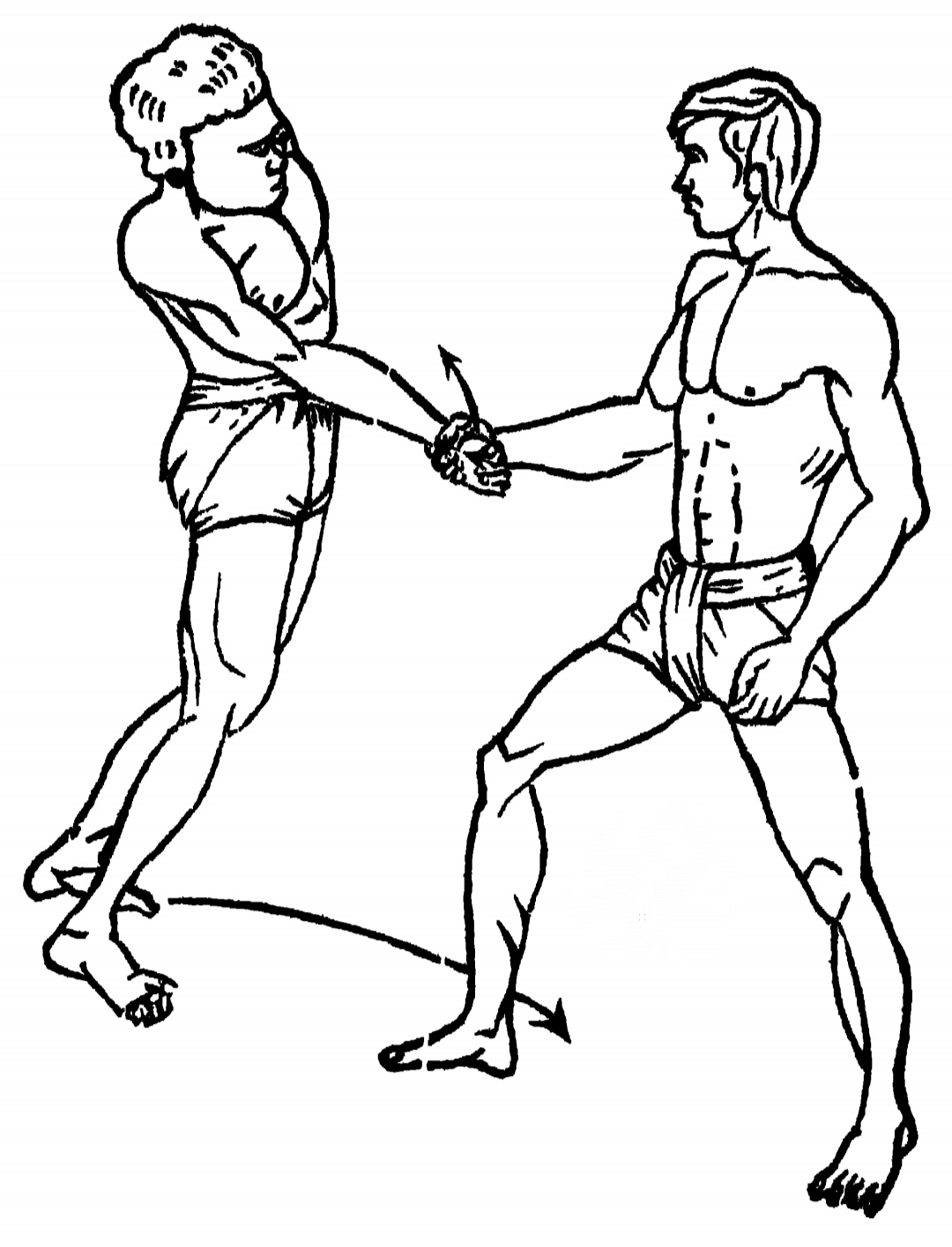

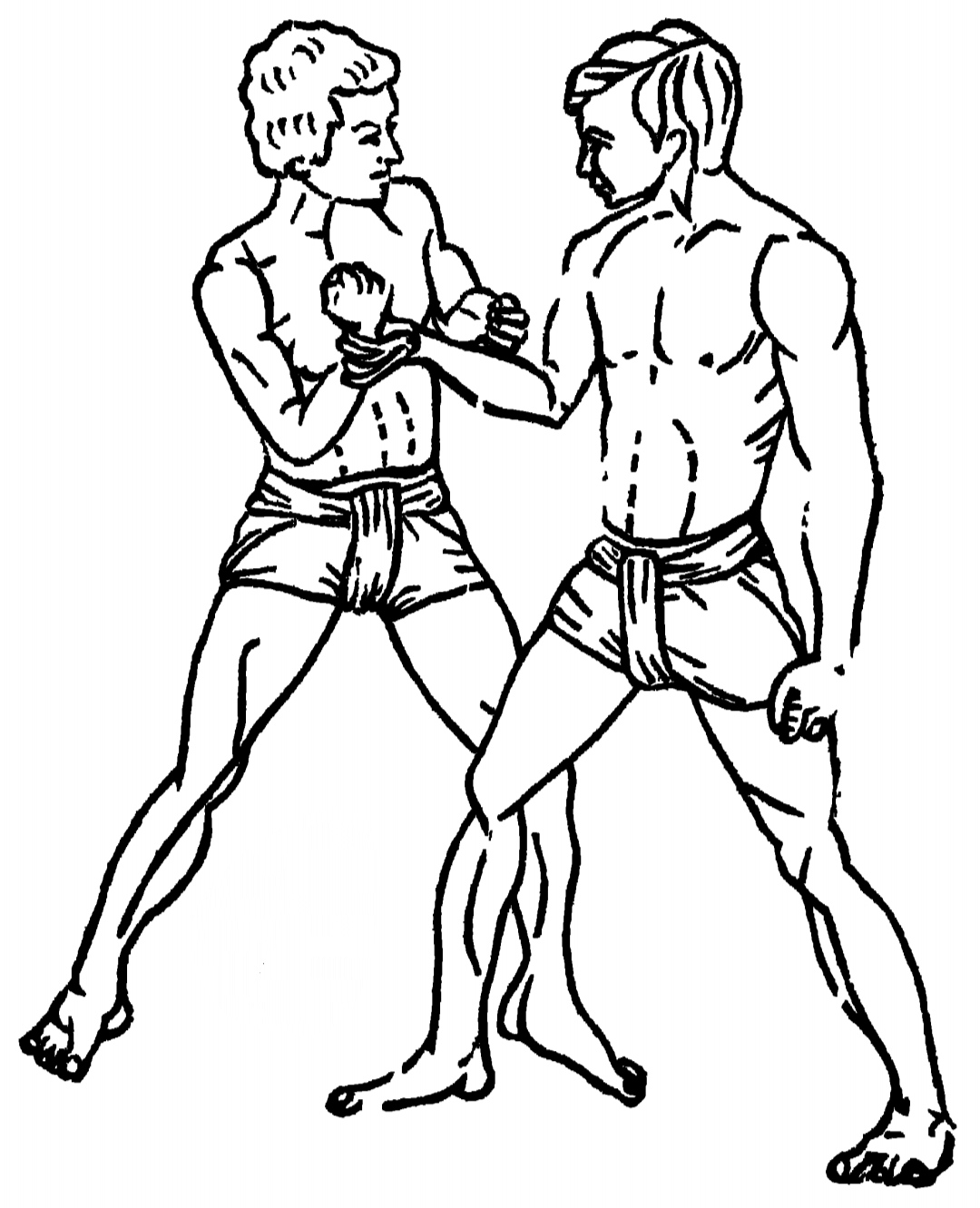

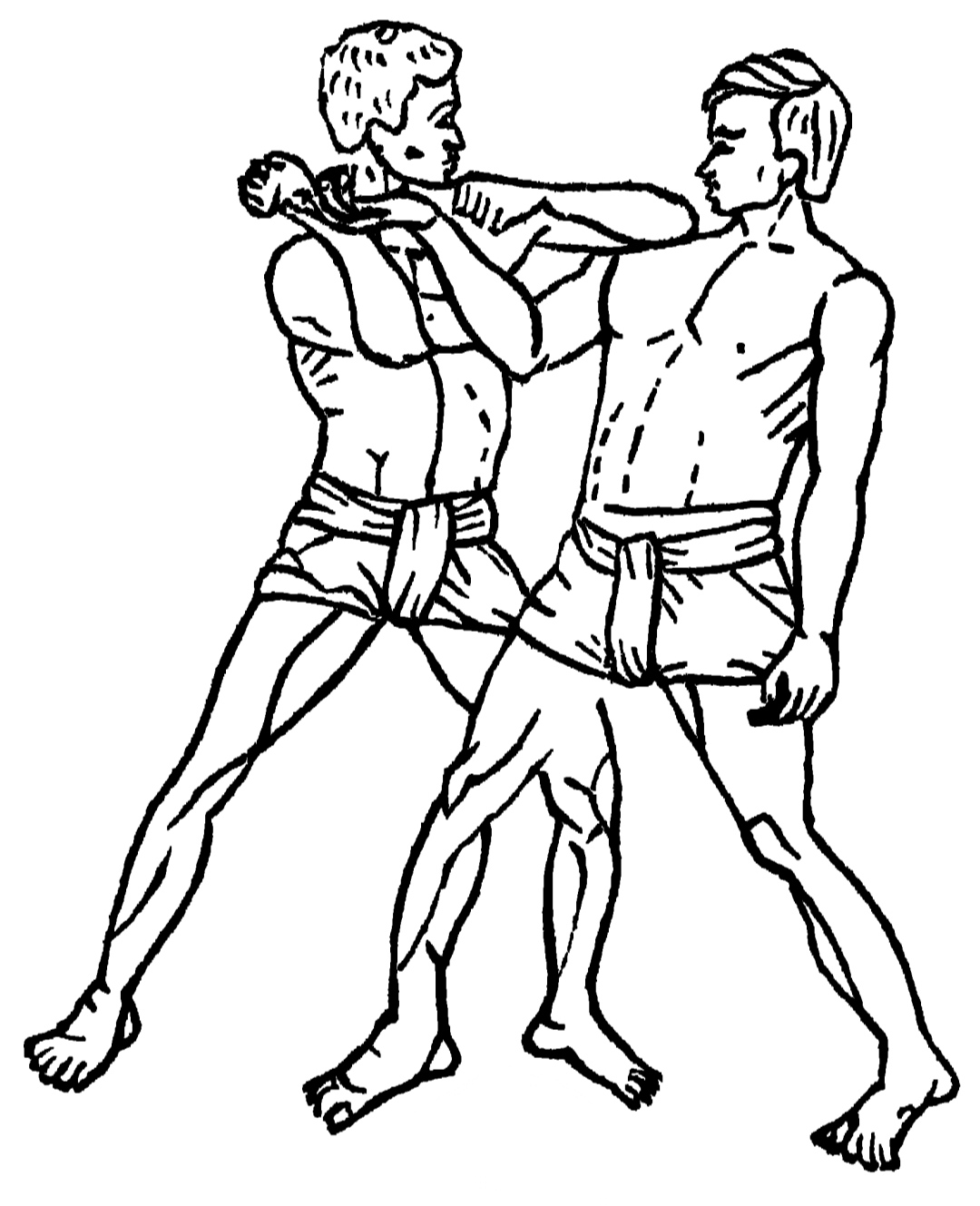

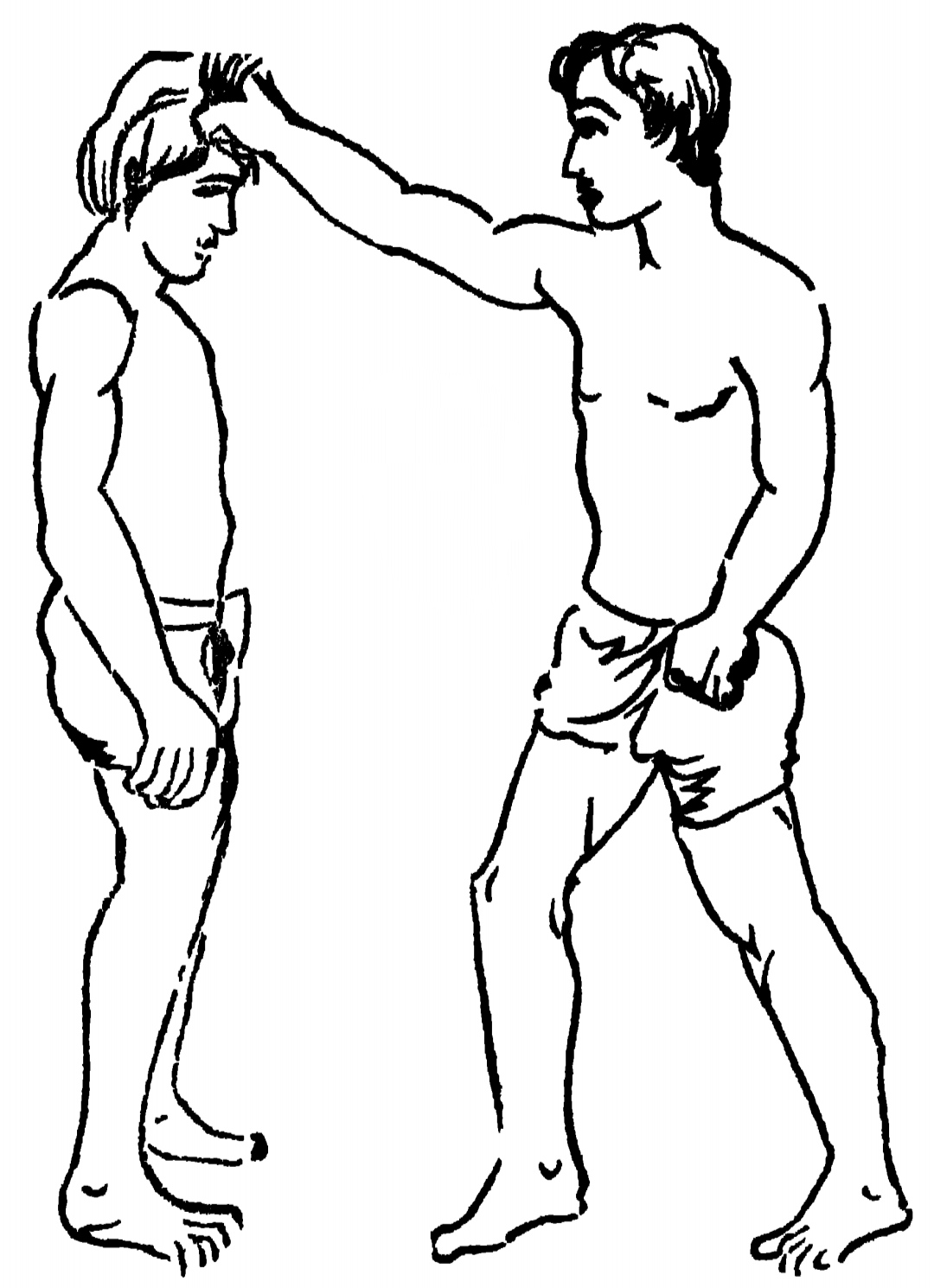

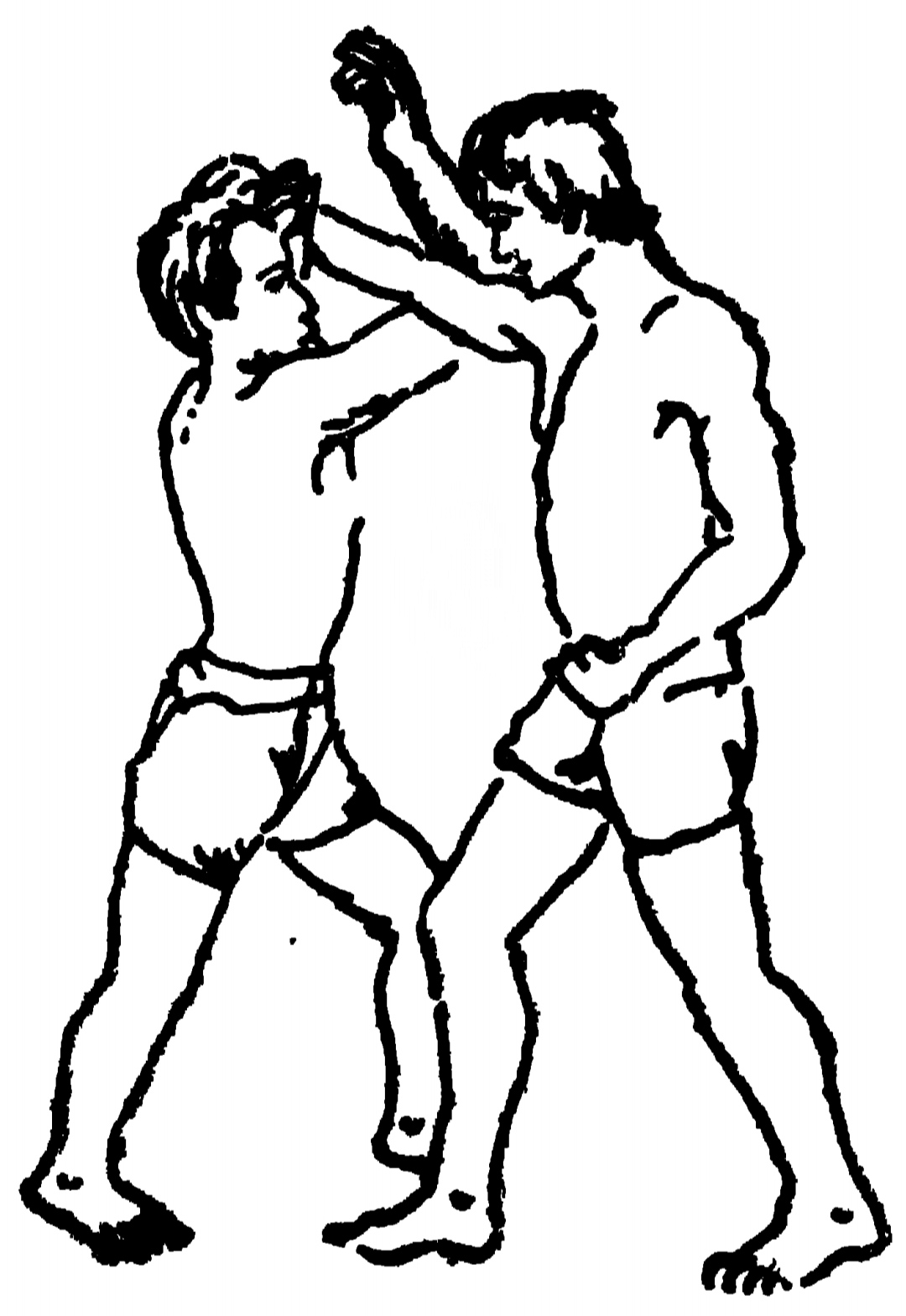

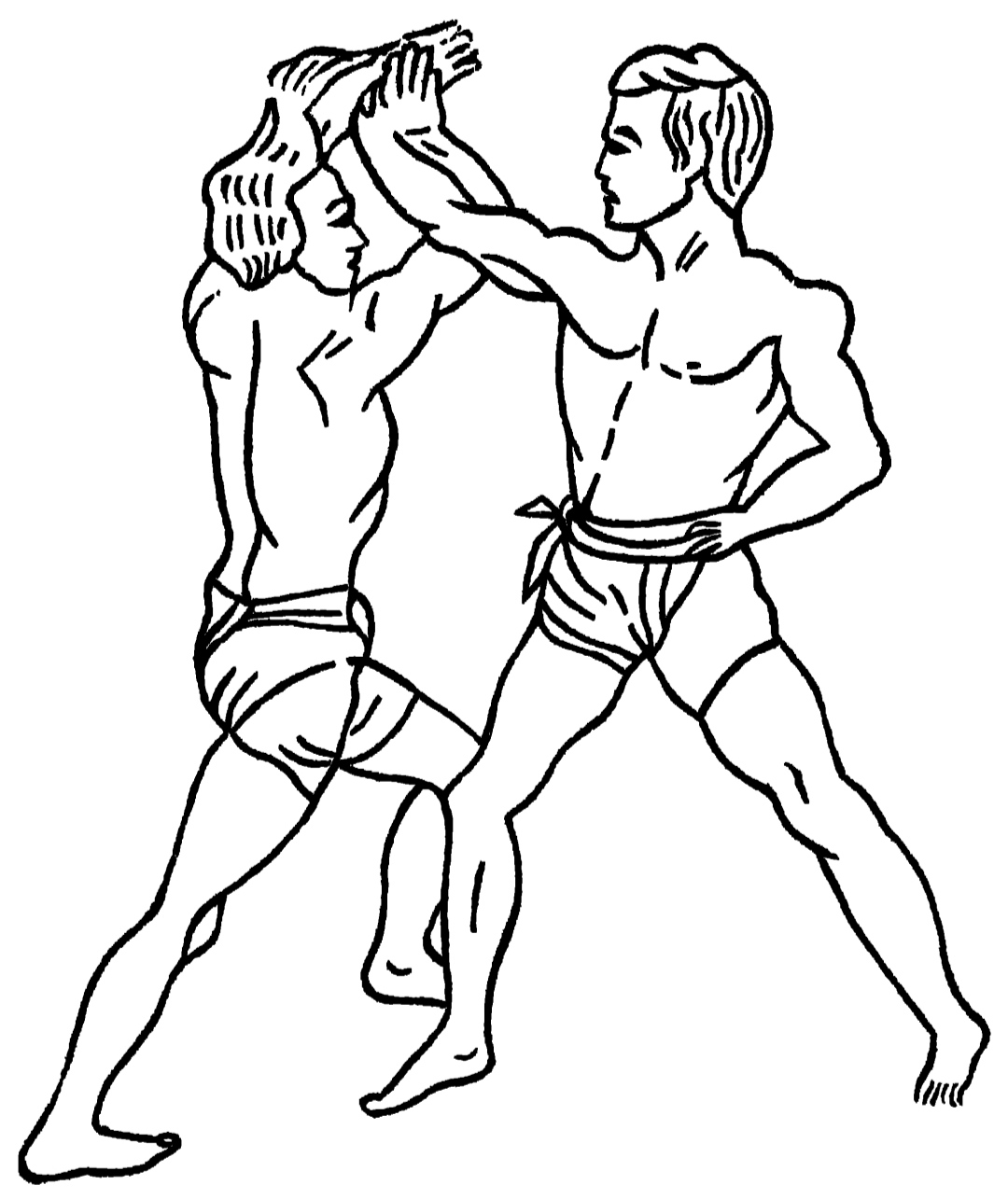

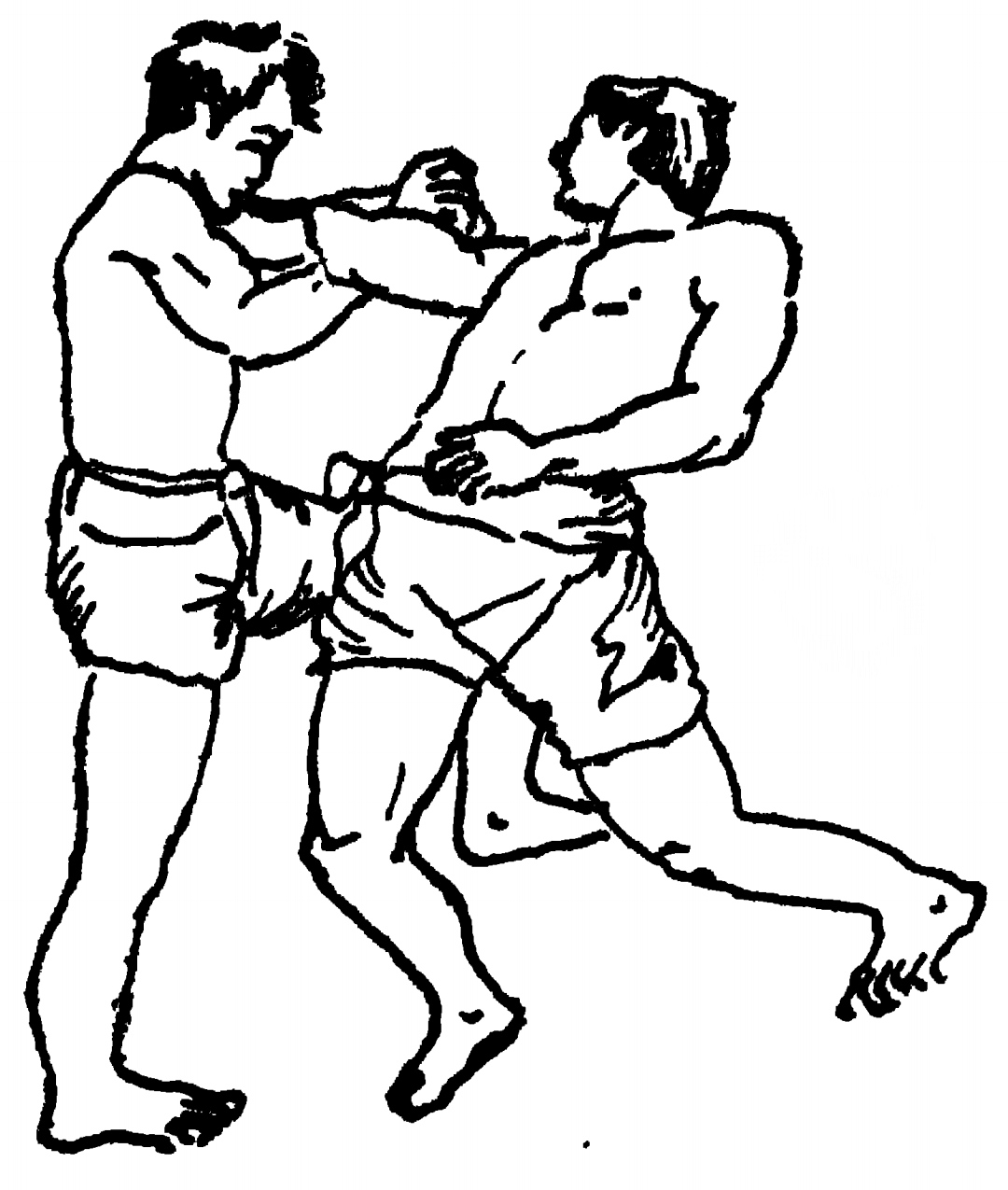

== Related pages ==
- Gad-Ga
- Gatka

== Other websites ==
- Grapplers Graveyard
