= Mukna =

Indian style of folk wrestling

Mukna is a form of folk wrestling from the north-east Indian state of Manipur. It is popular in Imphal, Thoubal and Bishnupur. The game is generally played on the last day of the Lai Haraoba festival and is an intrinsic part of the ceremonial functions.

== History ==
The mythological origin according to Meiteis trace back to Puya manuscripts such as Leithal, Leikharol, and Pudin. It is thought to have originated from the time of creation of the universe, while sanamahi try to destroy his creation by turning himself into samadon(a horse with wings) at that time pakhangba set a magical iron trap and caught sanamahi,pakhangba try to catch with a technique called (hao mukna lengfai chan mongba tajin kharou yetna) .from that struggle to catch the samadon mukna is derived from that very moment mukna menas try to defeat other or being more than other person,Khamba and Nongban were two legendary figures in Mukna.

== Sport ==
Matches begin with the competitors holding each other's belts called ningri. The object is to pin the opponent with their back touching the ground. The winner is called a yatra. Mukna contains many techniques (lou) which require absolute physical fitness and skill to be mastered. Holding the opponent's neck, hair, ear or legs with the hands is not permitted. Any strikes are also considered fouls. Anyone who touches the ground with any part of their body besides the feet is declared the loser.

Wrestlers are paired according to weight-class. The traditional attire not only protects the players' vital points but also helps to identify the pana or the yek to which the wrestler belongs.

It is popular in Kakching Haraoba, Chakpa Haraoba among others. The game is generally played on the last day of the Lai Haraoba festival and is an intrinsic part of the ceremonial functions.

== See also ==
- Akhara
- Boli Khela
- Gatta Gusthi
- Inbuan
- Malakhra
- Malla-yuddha
- Pehlwani
- Thang-Ta
- Vajra-mushti
