= Gambhir Singh Nonggaba =

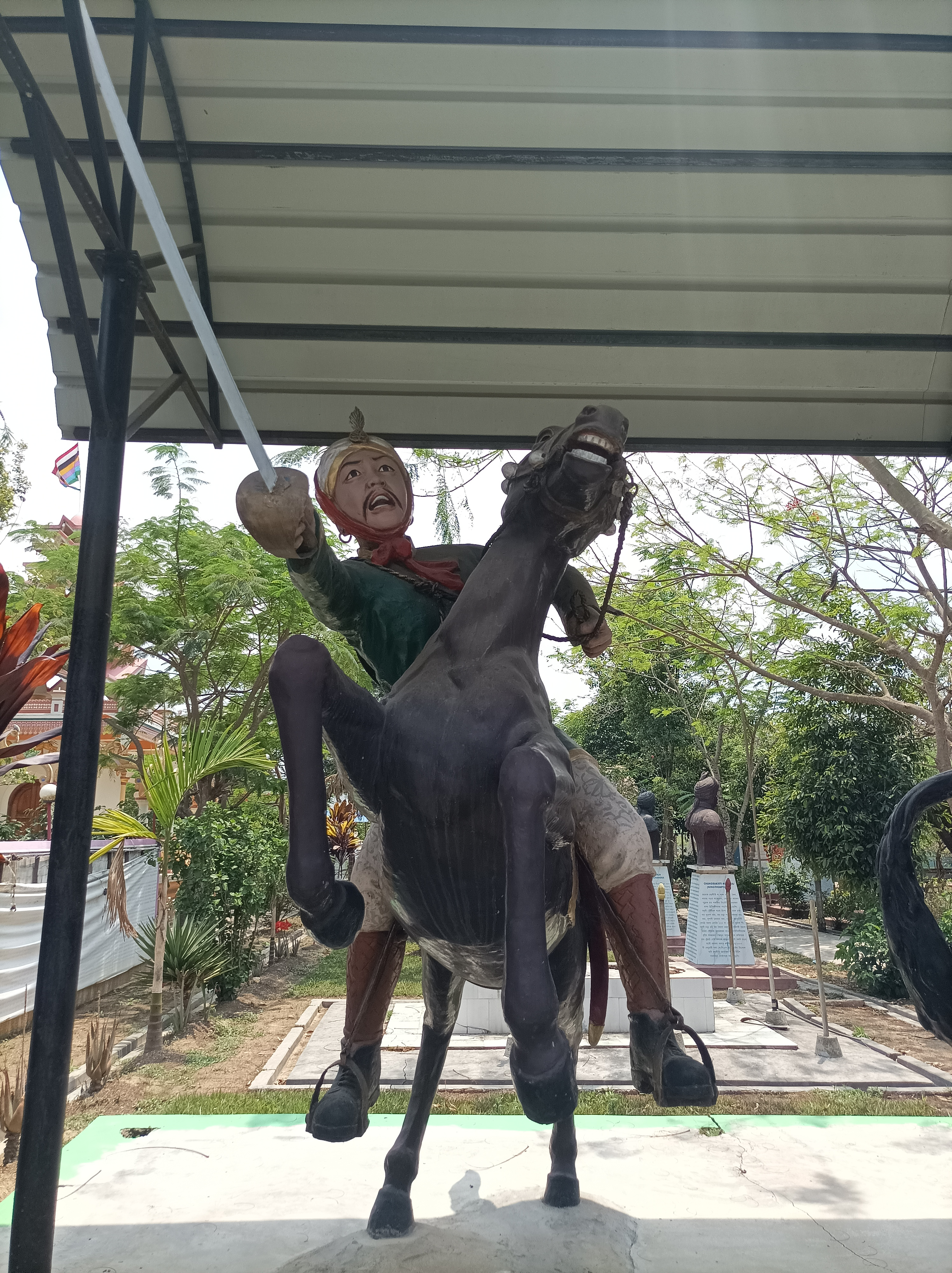
Carved art work of Meitei King Gambhir Singh

The Gambhir Singh Nonggaba (ꯒꯝꯚꯤꯔ ꯁꯤꯡꯍ ꯅꯣꯡꯒꯥꯕ; transl. Heavenward Journey of Gambhir Singh) (Note: often misspelt as Gambhir Singh Nongaba, with a single "g" in the "Nonggaba".) is a classical Meitei language literary work by Dayaram Louremba and Nabashyam Ningthoujamba. It describes the final days of Maharaja Gambhir Singh of Manipur. The work also looks back at the lives of Gambhir Singh and his cousin Nara Singh, showing them as strong leaders and warriors.

== Background ==
Gambhir Singh was a king of Manipur known both for his bravery and his deep devotion to Vaishnavism. He ruled for about eight years. Towards the end of his life, he decided to go on a pilgrimage to Brindavana. Before leaving, he gave control of the kingdom and his young son to his cousin Nara Singh.

Many people tried to stop him from going, including:

- His cousin Nara Singh
- Nobles of the royal court
- The royal priest and Brahman scholars
- Wives of the late King Bhagyachandra
- The king's step-mothers
- His own queen and other wives

Despite their pleas, Gambhir Singh completed all preparations for the journey. However, his health worsened suddenly, and he died soon after. His death caused great sadness among the people.

== Nara Singh as regent ==
After Gambhir Singh's death, the people wanted Nara Singh to become king. He refused and instead made the young prince Chandrakirti, who was only four years old, the king. Nara Singh served as regent and ruled on behalf of the child. Under his leadership, Manipur enjoyed peace and prosperity.

== Reflections on life and duty ==
The first part of the book recalls a similar moment in Manipur's history when another king, Chingthangkhomba, was stopped by his people from traveling to Nabadwip. In this work, Gambhir Singh explains to his followers why he wants to go to Brindavana. He speaks about the emptiness of worldly life and the importance of the soul.

He reminds the people of the fight he and Nara Singh had against the Burmese, and it is through his words that the strength of Nara Singh becomes clear. Nara Singh is praised as a man of strong character and loyalty.

== Philosophical thoughts of the King ==
As the story develops, Gambhir Singh is shown as a philosopher and a religious man. He speaks to the Brahman scholars about his desire to find peace in Brindavana. He describes it as a holy place where:

- Six seasons come and go
- The Kalpabriksha tree grows
- The cuckoo sings sweetly
- Krishna, the god of love, was born
- Radha and Krishna lived as forms of Brahman
- The soul finds rest after death

He also explains to his queens the difference between physical life and the soul. He says that while people are tied to each other by emotions, the soul is like a bubble—short-lived. After death, there is no difference between king and pauper.

== Praise for Nara Singh ==
Gambhir Singh expresses deep gratitude to Nara Singh. He says that the reason other countries recognize him as king is because of his cousin’s strength. When Nara Singh insists on following the rule of primogeniture (that the eldest should rule), Gambhir Singh argues against it. He says placing a woman, like the queen dowager, in charge could be dangerous, as the country follows salic tradition (no female rulers).

He also advises Nara Singh to be patient with his sister-in-law's difficult temper. Gambhir Singh compares a woman’s passion to fire—both powerful and unstable. He says women are like rivers, which never flow straight or upwards, but always wander and flow downward.

== Thoughts on kingship ==
Gambhir Singh also shares his views on leadership. He says:

- A proud king is like a drunk man or a careless child
- A good king listens to wise people and close family
- A king should be firm, but not angry

Harsh treatment of people will weaken the king’s power, just as termites destroy the wood they live in.

=== Chandrakirti becomes king ===
Nara Singh convinces the widowed Queen Kumudini that he does not want to be king. Chandrakirti is crowned with full ceremony. The writers compare this to the story of Bharata, the brother of Rama, who refused the throne and instead placed Rama’s sandals on it.

=== Rebuilding Manipur ===
The book describes the brave acts of Gambhir Singh and Nara Singh in defeating the Burmese invaders. After the war, they began to rebuild Manipur, which had been badly destroyed. Dead bodies filled the land, wild animals roamed the capital, and roads were blocked by plants. The valley was silent, except for the sounds of crows and birds.

== Death and soul's journey ==
The death of the king is described in detail. The moment feels very real and emotional. The prince's crowning and the funeral are shown as grand events.

The authors write that Gambhir Singh's soul did not take the usual path of the dead. Instead, without delay or struggle, his soul crossed the cosmic waters and reached Brindavana. There, it joined Radha, Krishna, and the Gopis.

== Language and style ==
The writing style of the book is poetic and flowing. Many parts are written in meter and are meant to be read aloud. The descriptions and comparisons add richness to the story. For example:

- The Brahman scholars say the king’s death is like a small plant left in the snow without a large tree for protection
- The king is called a lotus in a lake by his queens
- After his death, he is compared to a garland fallen in the dust
- The king himself is described as unmoved like the ocean, unaffected by the sun or storms

== See also ==
- Awa Ngamba
- Samsok Ngamba
- Takhel Ngamba
- Chingthangkhomba Maharaj Ganga Chatpa
