= Chandrakirti Jila Changba =

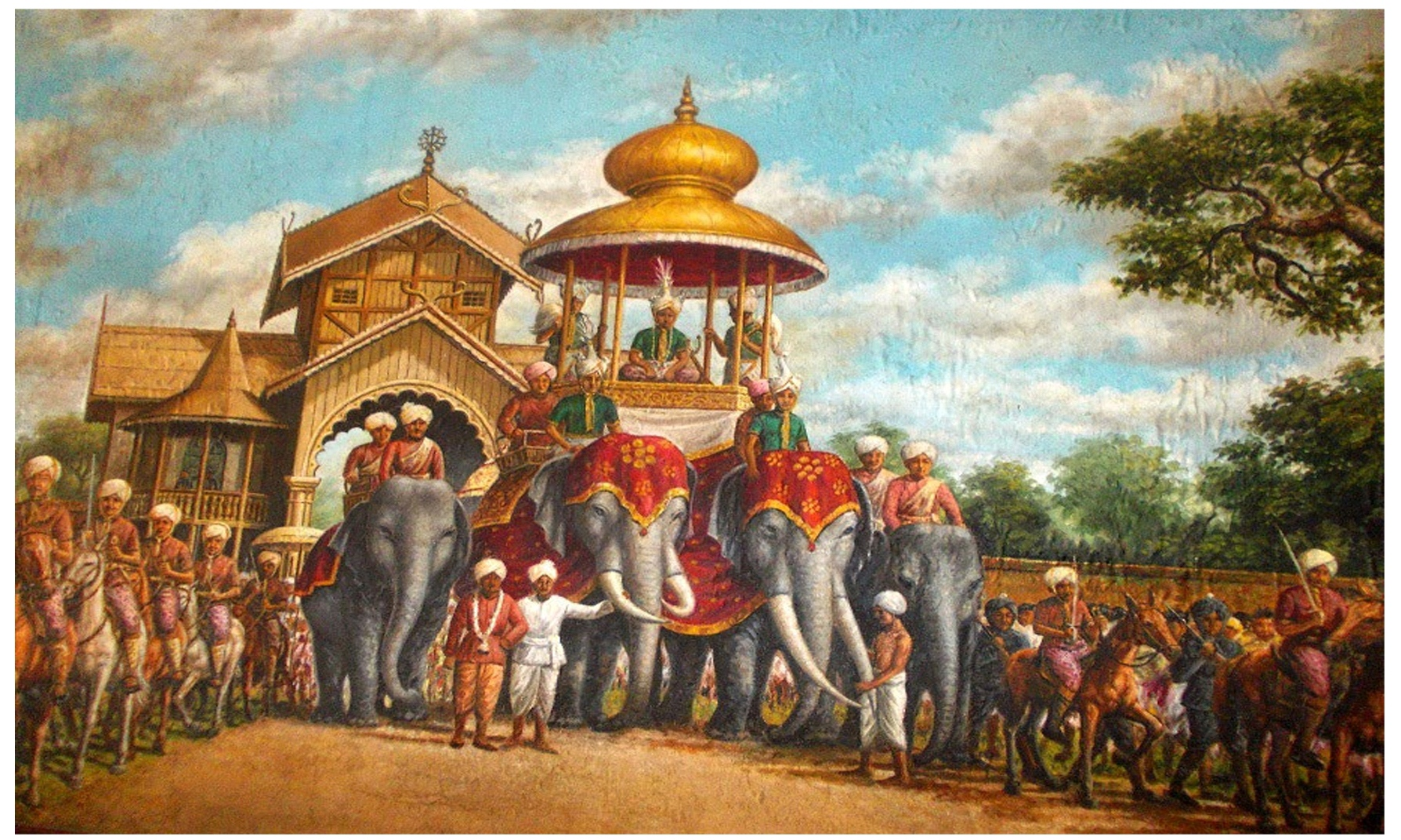
A classical Meitei painting depicting Meitei king Chandrakirti, the ruler of Kangleipak (Manipur), riding on elephants, on the way to “Jila Durbar” (“Jila Darbar”) to meet Lord Northbrook, the then Viceroy of India

The Chandrakirti Jila Changba (ꯆꯟꯗ꯭ꯔꯀꯤꯔꯇꯤ ꯖꯤꯂꯥ ꯆꯪꯕ), also known as the Visit of Chandrakirti to Cachar, 1876, or the King Chandrakirti's meeting with the Viceroy on the bank of the Barak river, is a classical Meitei language literary text. It records the historic visit of Maharaja Chandrakirti to meet the British Viceroy and Governor General Lord North Brooke in 1876.

== Background ==
In 1876, Maharaja Chandrakirti of Manipur received an invitation from Lord North Brooke to meet him on a yacht on the River Barak at Silchar, locally called Jila. Initially, the king suspected the British motives, but he did not want to offend them. He prepared for the meeting with a large retinue and armed personnel.

After returning from the visit, Chandrakirti instructed Khumujamba Pundit, head of the Pundit Loisang (institute of pundits), to write an account of the event. Pundit Khumujamba engaged Sarangthem Sarupananda, Thouda Chaoba, Khundrakpa Jaya Singh, and Yumlembam Pena Khongba, assisted by four scribes: Yombya Angaton, Irungba Pabung, Khundrakpa Nungnang, and Khomdra Leisang. Their collective work resulted in Chandrakirti Jila Changba.

== Composition ==
The text begins with a customary invocation addressed to Lord Vishnu, Sri Ramchandra, and Sri Govindaji. It praises the virtues and prowess of Maharaja Chandrakirti, also called Naojinglen Nongdren Khomba. The narrative starts with the receipt of Lord North Brooke’s letter, delivered through Mr. Brown, the Political Agent in Manipur.

While the king was eager to meet the British head, his officials feared it was a trap similar to the one faced by his ancestor King Khagemba in the sixteenth century. Chandrakirti reassured his officials, mother, and queens, and personally oversaw preparations for the journey across mountains and rivers.

== Royal journey ==
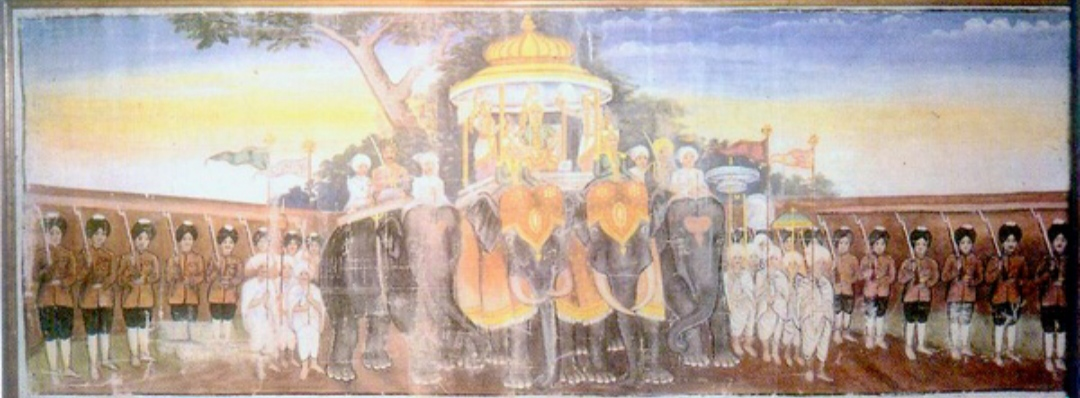
A traditional Meitei painting depicting “Jila Durbar” (“Jila Darbar”), the procession of Meitei King Chandrakirti, the Maharaja of Kangleipak (Manipur), riding on the Meitei royal elephants

The journey involved careful planning and large-scale preparations:

- A contingent of 500 soldiers, skilled craftsmen, and laborers cleared roads and built rest houses.
- Suspension bridges were constructed over turbulent rivers.
- Separate groups of musicians and guards were assigned to secure ports of call, including Lakhipur in Cachar.

The king set out riding a decorated chestnut horse. He was accompanied by elephants, attendants carrying sacred icons, and musicians. Five hundred soldiers marched ahead, with canons firing and conches blown, creating a grand procession.

== Reception and conference ==
On arrival, the Meitei king received a ceremonial reception by two thousand British troops. The king was flanked by his sons Kulachandra and Pheijaosana, and shaded by a canopy. The writers compared the scene to Soraren, the god of heaven, moving among divine beings.

During the conference, the king was accompanied by attendants holding fans, guards with swords, and musicians playing chamor. Lord North Brooke praised the king’s appearance, noting his grace both by day and night. The meeting discussed British plans to change outposts for trade and road construction. Chandrakirti returned home content and offered a feast and religious songs (Meitei Sankirtana) in gratitude to Sri Govindaji.

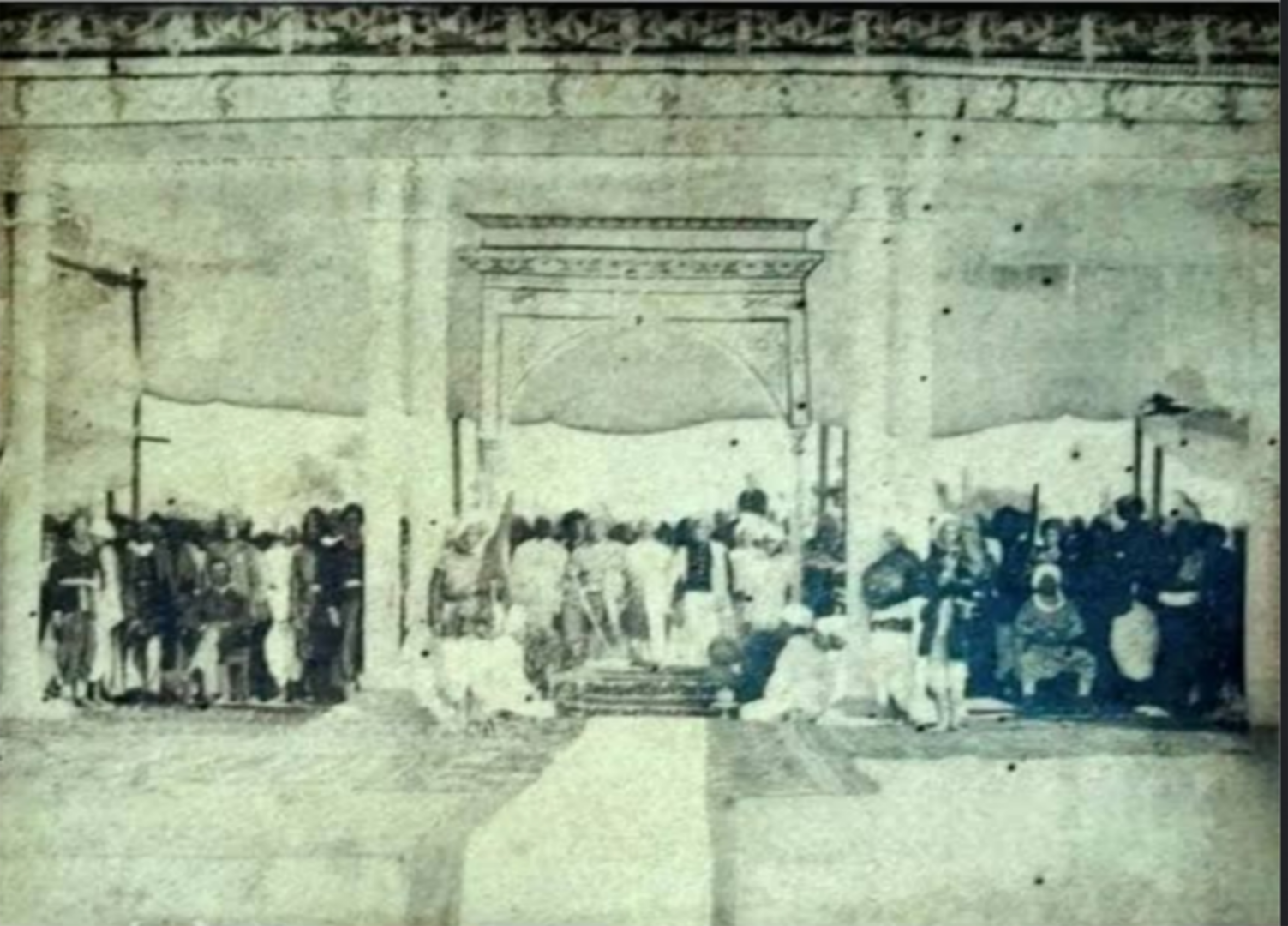
A scene from Jila Durbar

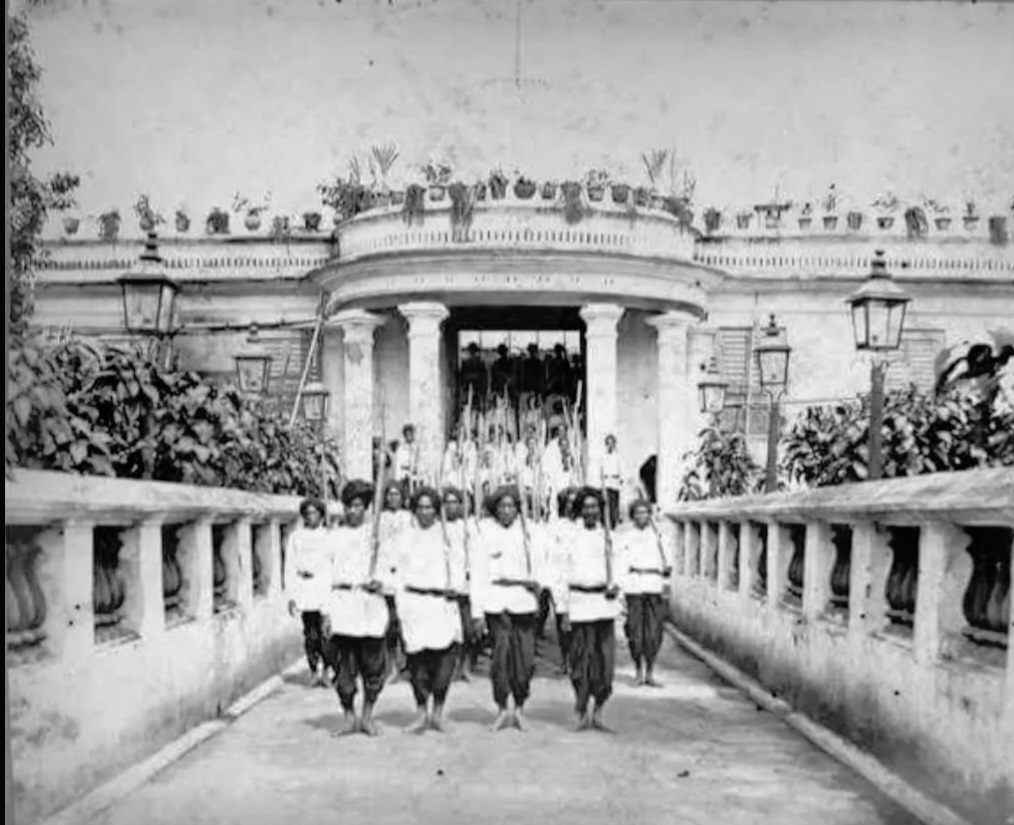
Manipuri-British soldiers to guard King Chandrakirti

== Divine elements ==
The text includes supernatural events to emphasize the king’s divine qualities:

- At a site where his ancestor Charairongba was struck by lightning, the guardian goddess Yumjao Leima appeared in human form.
- At the hill-river Eerang, the king saw Pakhangba, a divine snake, symbolizing protection.
- On the eve of the Cachar conference, Sri Govinda appeared in a dream, along with Rajarshi Bhagyachandra, to reassure the king.

== Heroic feats ==
Chandrakirti inspired courage in his men.

- Leishang Jatra, a strong royal attendant, saved people when a cane-and-bamboo bridge over the River Gwai collapsed.
- Maibya Tamra Singh carried offerings and a royal document across nine mountain ranges within four days to fulfill the king’s wish before the conference.

These feats remain celebrated in the Khongjom Parva ballad.

== Style and legacy ==
The writers used a noble, lucid style, avoiding foreign words while employing original periphrases. The work is valued for its originality and literary grace. Chandrakirti Jila Changba is considered the last major text in pre modern Meitei literature (Manipuri literature), with no subsequent comparable works.

== See also ==
- Awaa Ngamba
- Khahi Ngamba
- Samsok Ngamba
- Takhel Ngamba
- Chingthangkhomba Maharaja Ganga Chatpa
