= Oinam Bhogeshwar =

Oinam Bhogeshwar Singh (ꯑꯣꯏꯅꯥꯝ ꯚꯣꯒꯦꯁ꯭ꯋꯔ ꯁꯤꯡꯍ), also known as O. Bhogeshwor, or O. Bhogeswar, or O. Bhogeswor, or O. Bhogeshor, or O. Bhogesor, is an Indian scholar, editor, and writer associated with Meitei literature (alias Manipuri literature). He is best known for his editorial work on early and medieval Manipuri texts and for his contributions to the preservation and study of classical Meitei manuscripts and literary traditions. He contributed to the collection, editing, and interpretation of ancient Meitei literature (old Manipuri literary works).

== Career ==
Bhogeshwar Singh played a prominent role in the study and preservation of Meitei manuscripts and classical texts. His editorial and research work focused on both old and medieval Manipuri literature, which form a core part of the Manipuri literary corpus.

Among his noted contributions are editions of significant texts such as:

- Numit Kappa (Old Manipuri literature)
- Chandrakirti Jila Changba (Medieval Manipuri literature)
- Cheitharol Kumbaba (Royal chronicle of Manipur)

These works are often included in university syllabi and the UPSC Civil Services Examination (Manipuri Literature Optional), underscoring their literary and academic importance.

== Selected works ==
- Numit Kappa (ed.)
- Chandrakirti Jila Changba (ed.)
- Cheitharol Kumbaba V I (ed.)
- Ningthourol Sheireng (1967)
- Moirang Ningthourol Lambuba
- Ningthourol Lambuba (1967/68)
- Sanamahi Laikan, ( Imphal : 1972 )
- Nongsamei Puya, Imphal, 1973
- Loyumba Sinyen ( 1975 )

== See also ==
- Oinam family
