= Khahi Ngamba =

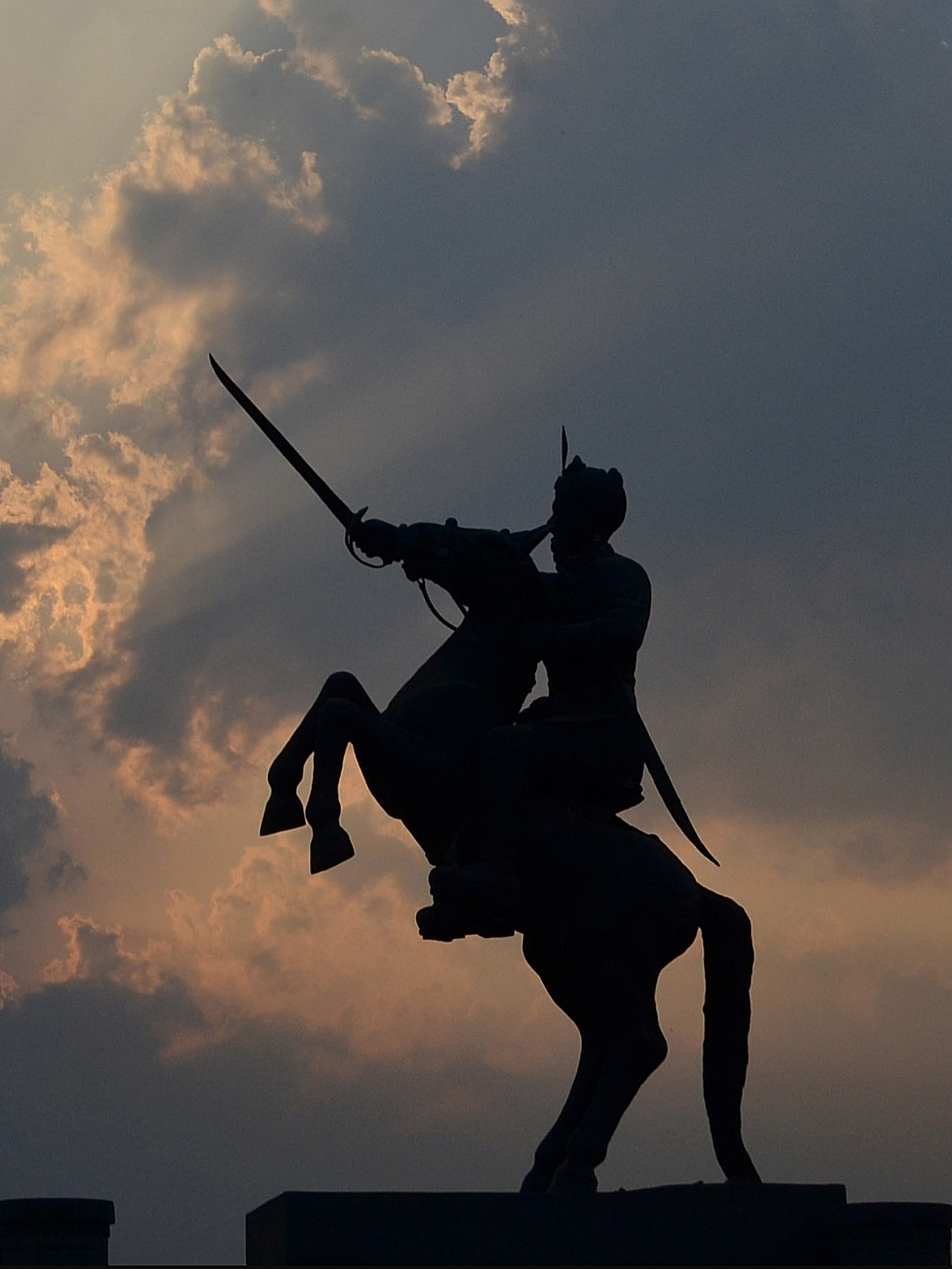
A classical Meitei sculpture of King Gambhir Singh, who was the conqueror of the Khasi Hills

The Khahi Ngamba (ꯈꯥꯍꯤ ꯉꯝꯕ, transl. “Conqueror of the Khasiyas”) is a classical Meitei language literary text. It was written during the reign of Maharaja Chandrakirti of Manipur. The work was composed to celebrate the victory of Maharaja Gambhir Singh over the Khasiyas in 1829.

"Khahi" is the Assamese language influenced Meitei pronunciation of the Khasi people or the Khasiyas, where "s" is pronounced as "h".

== Background ==
In 1850, Maharaja Chandrakirti became the undisputed ruler of Manipur after defeating all rivals to the throne. After this, he turned his attention to literary and artistic activities.

One of his ministers, Sri Ripujit Singh, wanted to please the king. He asked Chingakham Chaobaton, a scholar of the royal institution, to compose Khahi Ngamba. The text was meant to honour Maharaja Gambhir Singh, the father of Chandrakirti, and his victory over the Khasiyas.

== British request for help ==
When the British began building a road from Sylhet to Gauhati through Shillong, the Khasiyas who lived in the Khasi Hills tried to stop the work. They killed two British officers and several laborers. The British officer David Scott was unable to defeat the Khasiyas with the forces he had, so he wrote to the Meitei king asking for help.

After receiving the letter, Gambhir Singh held a meeting with his courtiers and military officers. He decided to help the British as an act of gratitude, because they had supported him against the Burmese and helped him gain the throne.

Gambhir Singh refused the idea of sending his brother Nara Singh, the Senapati, in his place. Instead, he asked Nara Singh to take care of the kingdom during his absence.

== March to the Khasi Hills ==
Wearing colourful martial dress, the king prayed to Sri Govinda and Nongda Lairen Pakhangba before departing with the best Meitei soldiers. The force first stopped at Sylhet, where a British officer welcomed them. After hearing the situation, Gambhir Singh sent a warning to the Khasi king, asking him to stop obstructing the British.

The Khasi king replied by asking Gambhir Singh to delay his actions, saying that both of them were descendants of the solar race. Gambhir Singh ignored this request and prepared his forces to attack the Khasi stronghold from different sides.

== Battle ==
A heavy exchange of gunfire took place between the Khasi forces and the combined Meitei and British forces. This was followed by hand-to-hand combat. Through the courage of Gambhir Singh and his soldiers, the Khasiyas were defeated. Their king and leading figures were captured and handed over to the British.

The rest of the text describes Gambhir Singh’s role in supporting Vaisnavism in the Sylhet region and helping the Cacharis rebuild their villages.

== Literary features ==
Although the work is short, it has an impressive presentation. The invocation uses a style not seen before. Before describing the king, the writer asks for the blessing of the goddess of learning.

As in an earlier work, the king is shown as calm and detached from worldly concerns, preparing for a pilgrimage to Jagannath Kshetra. But when he receives David Scott’s letter—addressed to “the king whose ancestors came from the sun, who holds the royal sceptre under a golden canopy, who is deep as the ocean, firm in judgement, wise as Brihaspati, warlike as Kartik, and feared by other kings”—he sets aside his pilgrimage out of gratitude.

Gambhir Singh refuses to send his younger brother in his place. Ignoring the danger to his own life, he goes into battle himself. As a staunch Hindu, he also refuses David Scott’s request to postpone the Rathjatra festival in Sylhet. The Cacharis regarded him as an incarnation of a god. The writer concludes that he was as generous with rewards as he was fearless in war.

== Imagery and style ==
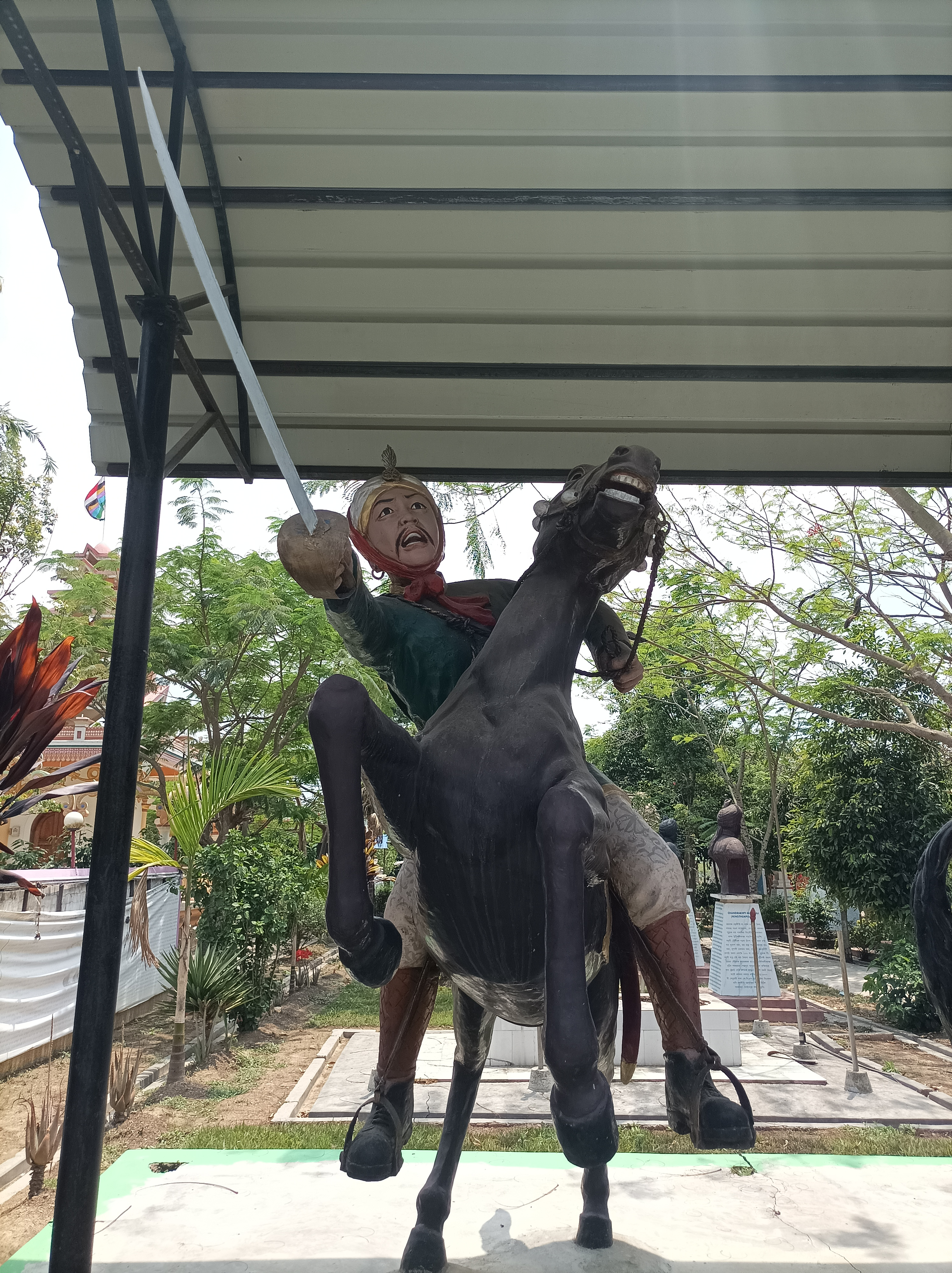
Figure of Meitei King Gambhir Singh

The text uses archaic and lyrical language, though this becomes simpler near the end. Imagery is used effectively:

- The king’s march and war-cry are compared to a thunderous descent of the lord of the sky.
- Nara Singh lying prostrate with tears during his farewell recalls Bharata and Satrughana falling before Rama.
- The clash of Meitei and Khasi forces is compared to the winding and unwinding of a lathe cylinder.
- According to David Scott, Gambhir Singh’s fighting style is like that of Arjuna, the brother of Dharmaraj.

== Pathos ==
The writer also expresses deep emotion when describing the end of the battle:

- The Khasiyas, once eager for fighting and filled with energy, became silent. Their courage disappeared, and the land became as quiet as a place of ruin. No animals cried out. Women and children lacked the strength to weep. Families who had lost their men suffered in silence, as if the land itself had turned into hell.

== See also ==
- Meitei people in Meghalaya
- Meitei people in Assam
- Awa Ngamba
- Samsok Ngamba
- Takhel Ngamba
- Chingthangkhomba Maharaj Ganga Chatpa
