= Takhel Ngamba =

Meitei epic of the historical conquest of Tripura kingdom

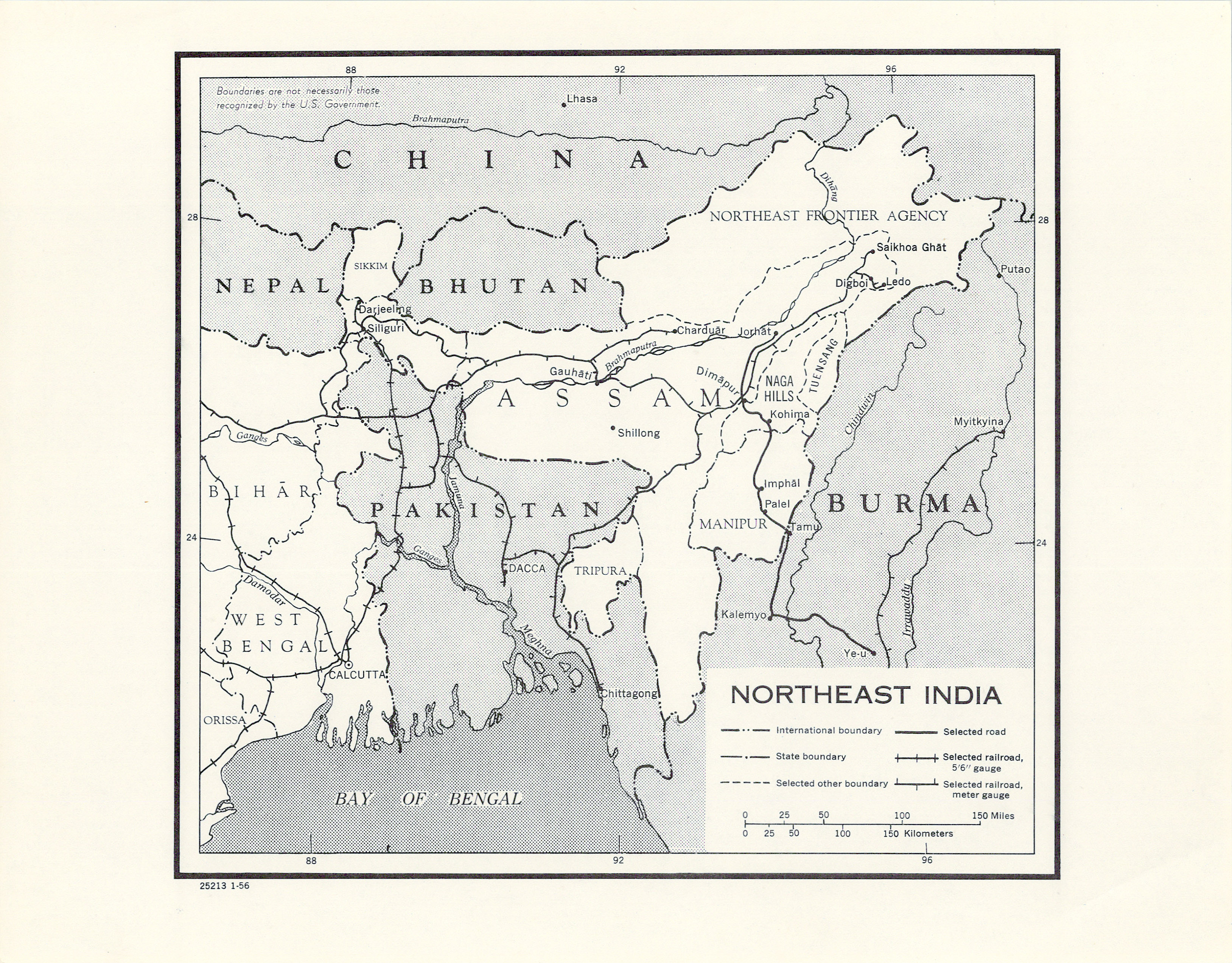
20th century map of Manipur and Tripura

The Takhel Ngamba (Note: sometimes also spelled as "Takhel Ngampa") (literally, "Success against Takhel" or "the conquest of Tripura" or "Victor of Tripura") is a Meitei language literary text that chronicles the historical conflict between the Manipur king Garib Niwaz, also known as Pamheiba, and the Tripuris of the Tripura Kingdom, as well as the Burmese forces. It is an epic composition from the medieval period, attributed to the prominent writer Nunggangbam Govindharam written in the Meitei script.

The Takhel Ngamba by Nunggangbam Govindaram presents an account of the Meitei king’s victory over the Takhels providing detailed descriptions of the laws of chivalry observed by Meitei warriors. It outlines the ethical treatment of prisoners of war, defeated soldiers, and individuals seeking pardon or refuge, with a clear prohibition against their execution. The text also describes the customs and traditions associated with warfare, including the procedures followed by kings when preparing for battle and the formal receptions they received upon returning from victory.

== Style ==
The language of the Takhel Ngamba (ꯇꯈꯦꯜ ꯉꯝꯕ) is characterized by grand, stylized diction, incorporating elements of non native language vocabularies. The language of Takhel Ngamba is characterized by a more modern diction, reflecting both its historical roots and its adaptation to contemporary linguistic standards.

"Takhel" (also spelled "Takhen") is a Meitei language word for the kingdom of Tripura and the Tripuri people.

=== Metaphors ===
The writer portrays the king with nobility and valor. The conflict between the Tripuris and the Meeteis is described through vivid metaphors, likening it to the struggle between two large elephants in a banana grove or two hungry lions fighting over a piece of meat. The Tripuris’ relentless assault is compared to a wild boar struck by a spear, a school of fish swimming upstream in a narrow canal, or a strong current that cannot be restrained by a reed-made dam.

== Portrayal of the Meitei ruler ==
The narrative of the Takhel Ngamba portrays the king as a courageous and formidable figure, likened to the mythical predatory bird Garuda in Hindu tradition. The text emphasizes the king’s leadership and valor in the face of a dual-front assault. During a strategic retreat from the overwhelming Burmese offensive, the king performed a ritual obeisance to his traditional Meitei deity, Lainingthou Sanamahi (ꯂꯥꯏꯅꯤꯡꯊꯧ ꯁꯅꯥꯃꯍꯤ), and instructed his men to bring his four-year-old horse and finely crafted spear for personal combat. He subsequently led a symbolic war dance to inspire and rally his troops.

O brave Meetei soldiers! You are a rare breed among fighters and may be compared to warrior-bees in the month of Langban (Sept-Oct). You should not turn back while fighting the enemy. From Nongda Lairen Pakhangba the progenitor of Meetei Kings down to King Charairongba my Sire, not a patch of Meetei land had been surrendered to any alien hand.

During the reign of our grandsire Khagemba, the invading Burmese were not only defeated but many of them were captured like fishes trapped in the flooded-water.

And you are veritably the descendants of those valiant souls who had served unflinchingly generations of Meetei kings. How then should the Burmese be able to conquer our land?

And now during my reign, even the king of terrors neither would nor intrude into our midst, let along the Burmese, O brave Meetei Sons! If you can win the day against the Burmese you shall ever be remembered by generations to come.

== Burmese alliance for the Tripuris ==
The Burmese, resentful of their previous defeat by the Meiteis, sought an opportunity for revenge. They allied with the Takhels (Tripuris), who also harbored grievances against the Meeteis. These grievances stemmed from the Meeteis’ interception of a Takhel detachment collecting tributes from villages near Manipur, the seizure of the holy Srimad Bhagavat text from Takhel travelers, and the refusal to return a Brahman scholar, Swarupananda, and a Muslim Takhel emissary.

The combined forces of the Burmese and Takhels invaded Manipur. While the Meeteis were still engaged in combat with the Burmese in the east, the Takhels advanced toward Kwakta in the southwest.

The king of Manipur initially dispatched a contingent of troops under his trusted general, Akong Haomacha, to confront the Takhels. This force was subsequently reinforced by another under the leadership of the distinguished warrior Thangjaba Chakrapani. After securing victory over the Burmese, the king swiftly turned his attention to the southwest, continuing his campaign with renewed confidence and effectively defeating the Takhel forces.

The king’s march to battle, accompanied by a strong army and the support of his people, is depicted with grandeur, reminiscent of the heroic battles. The narrative highlights the psychological impact of the king’s personal leadership on the Takhels.

Faced with the king’s presence, the Takhels fled in panic. In the ensuing disorder, their garments became entangled in thorny bushes and low-hanging branches, creating a chaotic scene likened to a tree bursting into full bloom during spring.

== An account of a Meitei soldier ==
A notable incident in the narrative involves a Meitei soldier who, after a daring raid, is unable to continue due to a severe leg ulcer. Facing imminent capture by the enemy, he requests his comrades to behead him and send his head to his wife.

== Kindness of the Meitei king ==
The Meitei king of Manipur displays magnanimity when he complies with the request of a fleeing Burmese commander, who is the son of the Meitei king’s aunt. The commander requests large quantities of local fish, rice, spicy wine, and beer, which the king provides without hesitation. Additionally, when Meitei soldiers are on the verge of pursuing the defeated Tripuris, the king intervenes, urging mercy. He instructs his general to treat any wounded or hungry Tripuris seeking food and shelter with kindness.

== Leadership of the Meitei king ==
The Meitei king’s leadership is also marked by strategic insight. He tests the loyalty and fighting spirit of his men by proposing an unconditional surrender to the Tripuris. This proposal is rejected, which inspires a vigorous response from his soldiers. Among them, Cheksa Chakrapani emerges as a distinguished warrior, repeatedly charging into enemy lines to rescue captured comrades and create disruption within the enemy ranks.

== See also ==
- Awa Ngamba
- Khahi Ngamba
- Samsok Ngamba
- Ahom–Meitei relations
- Burmese–Meitei relations
  - Chahi Taret Khuntakpa
- Meitei–Shan relations
- Meitei people in Assam
- Meitei people in Bangladesh
- Meitei people in Myanmar
- Meitei people in Tripura
  - Meitei language in Tripura
  - Meitei queens of Tripura
- Meitei martial arts
- Meitei traditional weapons
- Meitei traditional toys
- Meitei traditional games

== Bibliography ==
- Singh, Bhogeshwar (1986). Takhel Ngamba (in Manipuri). India: Internet Archive; Digital Library of India.
