= Samsok Ngamba =

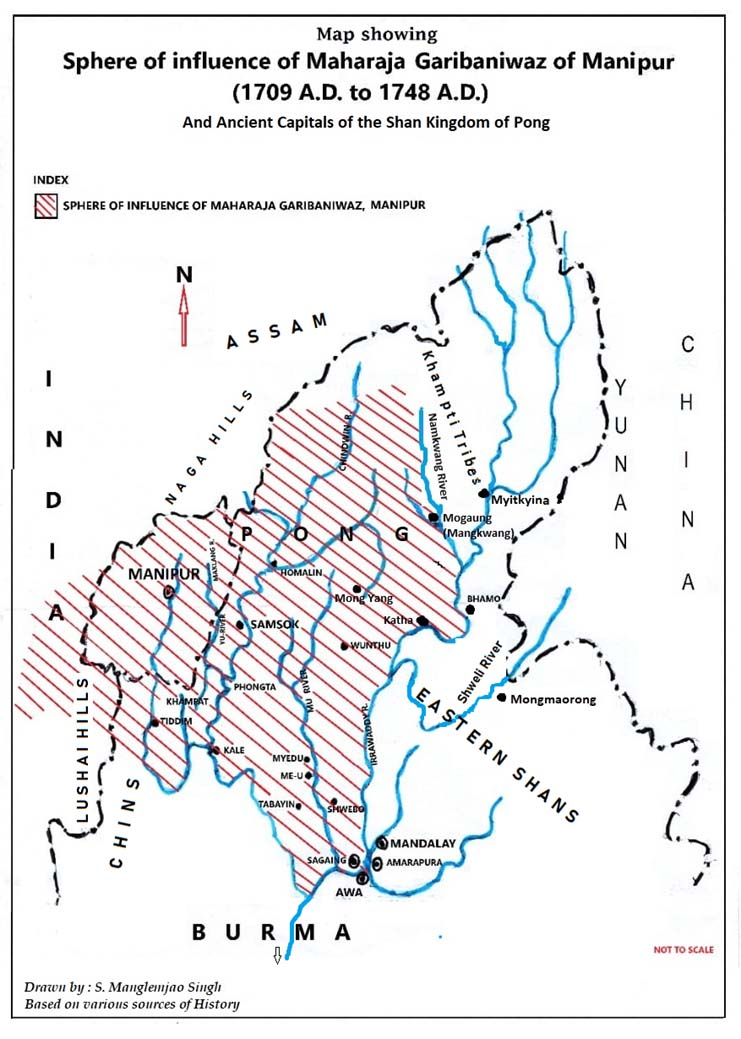
Sphere of influence of Maharaja Garib Niwaz of Manipur

The Samsok Ngamba (ꯁꯝꯁꯣꯛ ꯉꯝꯕ), also spelled as the Samshok Ngamba, is a classical Meitei language historical narrative text attributed to Laisram Aroi and Yumnam Atibar. The story describes a military campaign led by the Meitei king Garibniwaj Pamheiba against the Burmese in the year 1717. Very little is known about the authors, but the first writer is said to have personally accompanied the king in the campaign.

== Background ==
=== Cause of the conflict ===
The events begin with Chakpa Makhao Ngambi, the sister of King Charairongba (reigned 1697–1709), who was married to the king of Burma and made queen. After giving birth to a son, she was demoted, which caused deep resentment in the Meitei court.

King Charairongba, before his death, asked his son Pamheiba to take revenge for the insult to his sister. After ascending the throne, Pamheiba received another marriage proposal from the Burmese king, who requested a Meitei princess and sent rich gifts. The new king pretended to agree in order to create a reason for invading Burma.

== Invasion and the Battle of Samsok ==
A group of Meitei soldiers disguised as women crossed the Ningthi (Chindwin) river, pretending to accompany the bride. They attacked the Burmese waiting on the other side. The Burmese forces were defeated, and their boats were destroyed. The Meiteis collected around a thousand swords and shields.

Following this, the Meitei army laid siege to Samsok, a region in eastern Burma, for one month. The chief and people of the area, suffering from famine, surrendered.

Four days later, Burmese reinforcements arrived under generals Chaothap and Tarung Tekwa, but they were also defeated by the Meitei army.

== Military strategy and leadership ==
King Garibniwaj Pamheiba is portrayed as a skilled strategist and strong leader. Before the siege, he arranged food supplies and placed his trusted generals at the main gates of Samsok:

- Satpam Kyamba at the southern gate
- Thyam Naiba at the eastern gate
- Head Sellungba at the northern gate
- Honglai Sansaba at another key position

He also prepared for a rear attack, using smoke signals to launch a simultaneous assault from multiple directions, including from boats. The king himself led the attack wearing full armor.

== Courage and charisma ==
The king is shown as brave and inspiring. In one battle, when his soldiers were being pushed back, he jumped from his horse and performed a war dance, shouting:

"I am here before you all, your king born of Great Charairongba, and the captor of wild tigers. My beloved men why shall you stage a retreat?"

He was also kind to those who surrendered. When the chief and people of Samsok begged for food and help to rebuild their village, Garibniwaj agreed at once.

== Personal traits and interests ==
Although a fierce warrior, the king also had a softer side. After his first victory in Burma, he showed interest in a wild orchid and asked the poet Laisram Aroi its name. The poet, though unaware of the flower's name, named it after the king.

After a second successful campaign, the king returned with many captives and a large amount of booty. He rewarded his followers by giving them new and deserving names.

== Style ==
The narrative is written in a refined, old-fashioned style, closer to prose than poetry. It expresses many human emotions through its characters.

The princess's sorrow is described with deep feeling. On her way to Burma, she stopped at Loukeirao hill and called for her father, the king. Despite his words of comfort, she cried and said:

"I, this Meitei princess, have been removed from my parents and brothers from this day. I have left behind a long distance and the dark nights have taken me farther away from my native land."

== Battle descriptions ==
The battle scenes are vivid and dramatic. One passage describes the battle as:

"The bullets from the intensive fire of the Burmese streaked across the sky like startled game birds winging out of the Loktak Lake. The Meitei force gave a matching reply with guns and arrows. The whole scene resembled the random flight of meteors, and the deafening sound of guns was like the roar of the approaching monsoon."

The famine in Samsok is also described in strong emotional terms:

"Since we are utterly starved, how shall we be able to subsist only on wild plants? We have now tasted even horse meat which we never touched. Death is now sure for us. The pretty damsels look pale, emaciated and quite old for their age. The babes in arms are snivelling from want of milk. How shall we let them die on stakes choked and with eyes upturned?"

== Use of similes ==
The writing uses many simple but strong similes:

- The fleeing Burmese soldiers are compared to a crumbling river bank.
- The people rushing out of the fort are compared to a school of fish swimming against the current in October.
- The princess’s fall from power is compared to a diversion of a flowing canal during the rainy season.

== Legacy ==
Samsok Ngamba presents King Garibniwaj Pamheiba as a bold and wise ruler, capable of both military strength and human compassion. The story includes war, sorrow, strategy, and poetry, giving a full picture of the events around the 1717 invasion of Samsok. The work stands out for its emotional depth, historical importance, and literary quality.

== See also ==
- Takhel Ngamba
- Khahi Ngamba
- Awa Ngamba
- Lanmi (Meitei culture)
- Burmese–Meitei relations
