= Awa Ngamba =

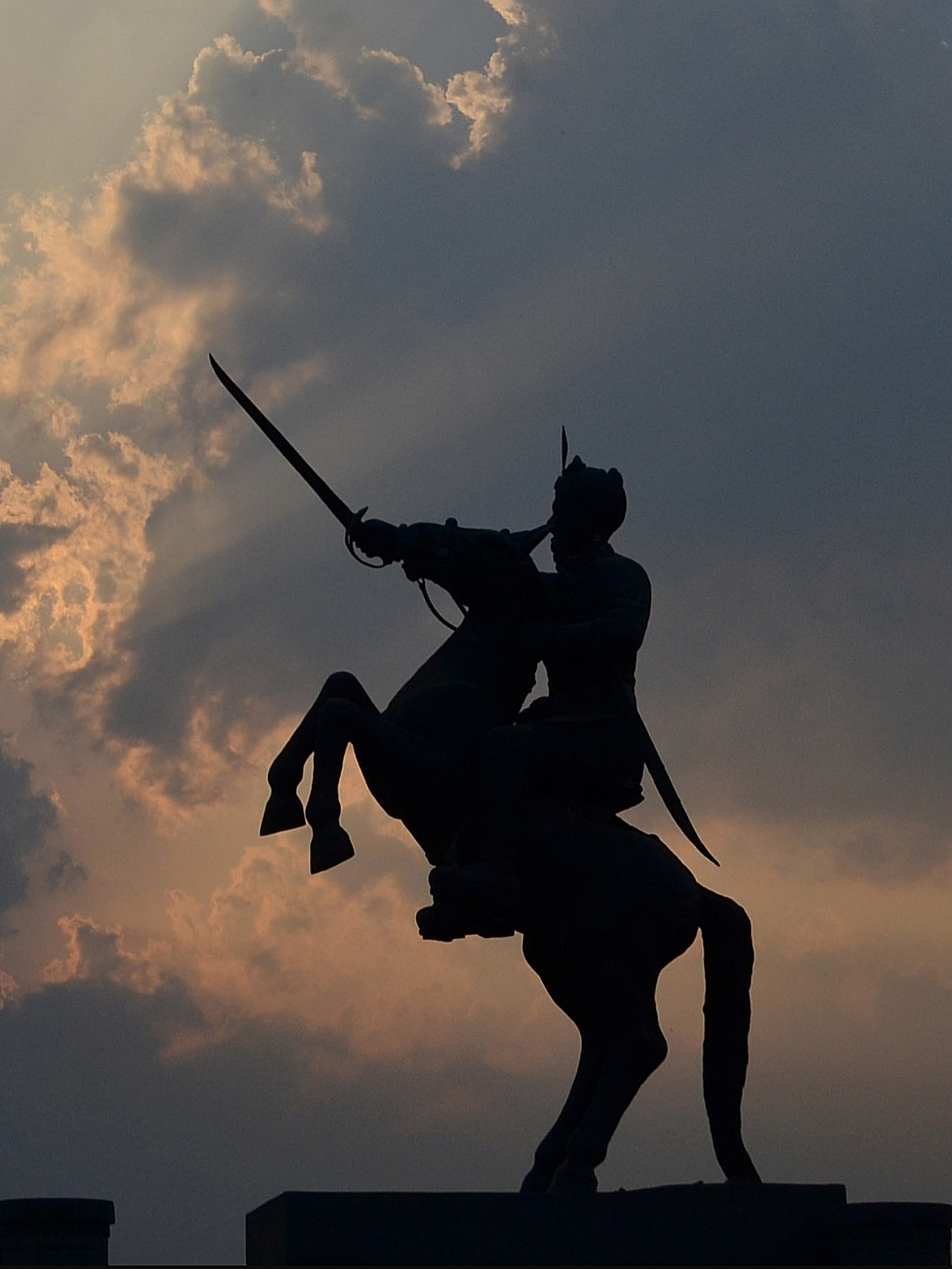
A classical Meitei sculpture of King Gambhir Singh, who was the conqueror of the Kingdom of Ava

The Awa Ngamba (ꯑꯋꯥ ꯉꯝꯕ) or the Ouwa Ngamba (ꯑꯧꯋꯥ ꯉꯝꯕꯥ) is a classical Meitei language historical work that tells the story of Gambhir Singh, the youngest son of Maharaja Bhagyachandra of Manipur. The work focuses on his heroism, leadership, and efforts to free Manipur from Burmese control.

== Background ==
Marjit Singh, the fourth son of Bhagyachandra, became king by removing his elder brother Chaurajit Singh with help from the Burmese. However, after becoming king, Marjit Singh turned against the Burmese. In response, Manipur was devastated for seven years.

During this period, the three fugitive princes of Manipur—Chaurajit, Marjit, and Gambhir Singh—joined forces. Together, they defeated Govindchandra, the king of Cachar, and divided his land among themselves.

== Burmese invasion and British alliance ==
The Burmese continued to attack strongly. Their invasion also affected Cachar and nearby British territories. The British asked Gambhir Singh, a Meitei prince, to help stop the Burmese. In return, they supported him with weapons, ammunition, and supplies to remove the Burmese from Manipur.

After successfully pushing the Burmese out of Cachar, Gambhir Singh built an army of 4,000 soldiers, using 500 rifles provided by the British. He chased the Burmese beyond the borders of Manipur and fulfilled his promise to wash the blood on his sword at the Ningthi River in Burma.

== Campaigns and consolidation ==
After regaining control of Manipur, Gambhir Singh carried out fast military campaigns against the hill tribes who resisted his rule. These campaigns showed his strong courage and determination.

== Other themes ==
The rest of the work includes stories and discussions such as:

- Manipuri scholars answering British questions about the royal lineage of Manipur
- Maharaja Bhagyachandra's prophecy about Gambhir Singh's future
- The type of Vaishnavism practiced in Manipur, with references to the holy life of Sri Chaitanya

The writer of the work seems to know Hindu and Vaishnavite texts well. However, the language used focuses more on storytelling than on literary style. Some borrowed words are misspelled. Even so, there are some powerful lines that bring life to parts of the story.

=== Incident during a British-Burmese Battle ===
One notable scene in the work shows Gambhir Singh's bravery during a battle between British and Burmese forces. The British commander, David Scott, invited the Meitei prince to watch the battle. Gambhir Singh did not come as a mere observer. He came fully prepared for action.

During the battle, the British misunderstood the Burmese retreat, not knowing they were hiding. Suddenly, the Burmese attacked from all sides, causing heavy losses. In the confusion, they tried to capture David Scott. From a distance, Gambhir Singh saw the danger. He rode his horse straight into the fight, sword in hand. Many Burmese soldiers were killed by him. He rescued David Scott by lifting him with one arm and riding back quickly.

The British dead and wounded were taken to the Tilain outpost over the next day and night, with the prince himself standing guard.

== Gambhir Singh’s words ==
After the rescue, a British officer thanked Gambhir Singh. The prince replied:

“I did not carry it out expecting any reward from you but did it solely prompted by the desire of repaying for what you had given us—food and shelter in your region for our survival as the Burmese had repeatedly ravaged our small country.”

The British officer was deeply moved and lowered his head in shame.

== Leadership and legacy ==
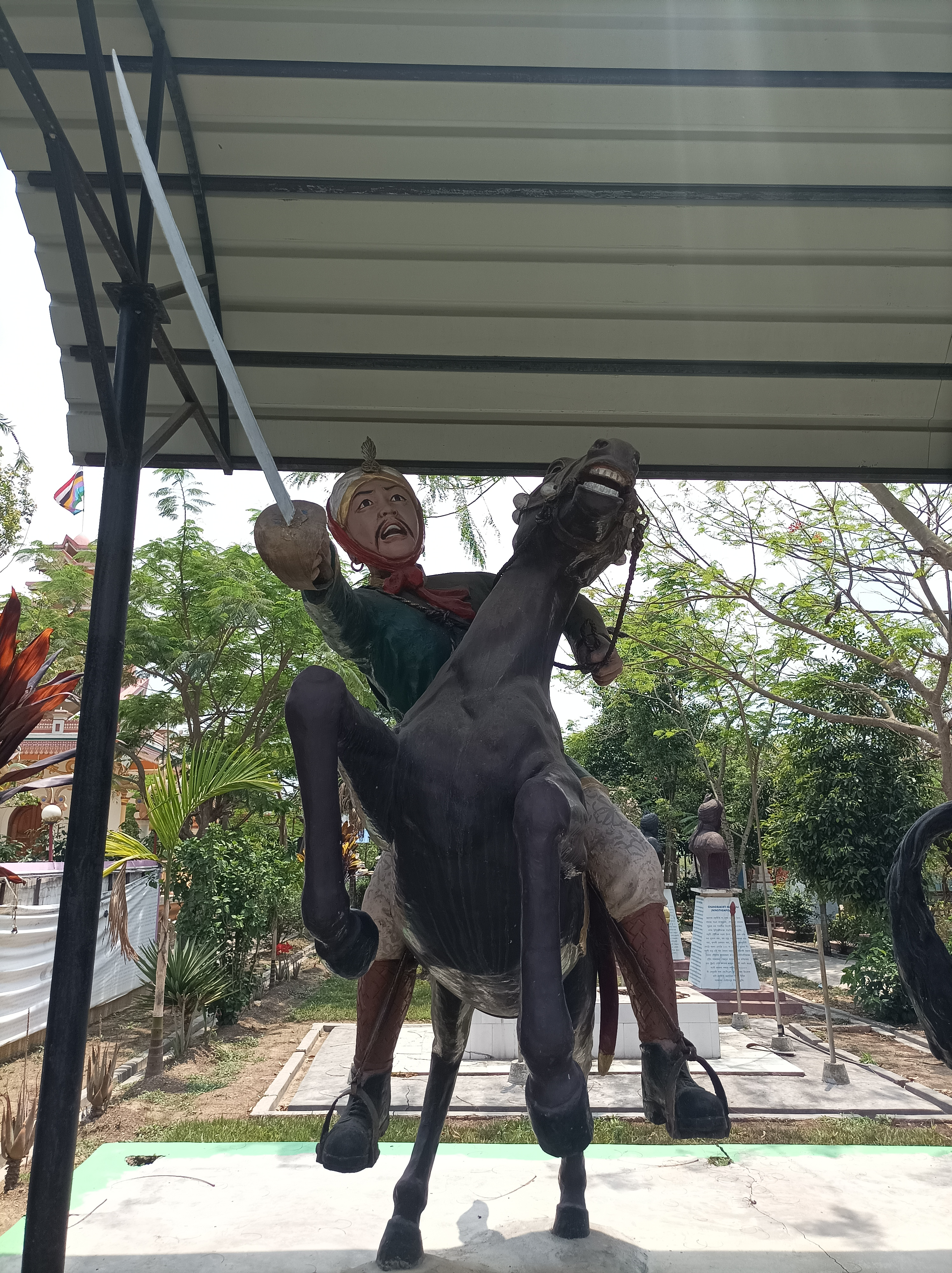
Sculpture of Meitei King Gambhir Singh

Although Gambhir Singh was a natural leader, he still listened to others before making big decisions. Before asking for British help to remove the Burmese from Manipur, he first consulted his people.

The work supports the traditional view of Gambhir Singh as the saviour of Manipur from Burmese control and as a kind-hearted leader devoted to his people.

== See also ==
- Takhel Ngamba
- Samsok Ngamba
- Khahi Ngamba
