= Chingthangkhomba Maharaj Ganga Chatpa =

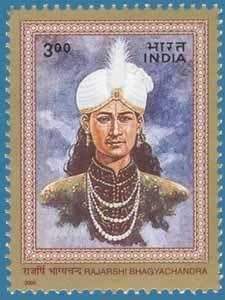
A portrait of King Ching-Thang Khomba (Rajarshi Bhagyachandra)

The Chingthangkhomba Maharaja Ganga Chatpa (ꯆꯤꯡꯊꯪꯈꯣꯝꯕ ꯃꯍꯥꯔꯥꯖꯥ ꯒꯪꯒꯥ ꯆꯠꯄ; transl. Maharaj Chingthangkhomba's Pilgrimage to the Ganga) is a classical Meitei language literary work written jointly by three scholars, Nabachandra Wangkhei, Hari Charan Thounapaton, and Wahengba Madhabram. It was composed near the end of the 18th century, during the peak of Vaishnavism in Manipur kingdom.

== Content and theme ==
The work focuses on the last part of the life of Maharaja Chingthangkhomba, also known as Bhagyachandra or Jai Singh. It shows him as a saintly king who, after ruling for forty years, decides to give up his throne and go on a pilgrimage to Nabadwip. He leaves the throne to his eldest son, Labanyachandra.

The story explores how the king is tempted and persuaded by several groups not to give up his power:

- His trusted uncle and Prime Minister, Sri Ananta Saha.
- Learned Brahmans, pundits, and the king’s preceptor, Sri Anupananda Thakur.
- His own people, for whom he dedicated his life.
- His beloved queens.

To all, the king respectfully refuses and asks for their blessings to fulfill his wish.

== Pilgrimage and death ==
The king’s journey lasts about seven to eight months. It is spent traveling through mountains, rivers, and plains with his followers. After returning from Nabadwip, the king dies at Sri Pat Kshetra near the Ganges River in Mursidabad on the exact day he predicted.

During this time, he appears calm, kind, and ready to face any danger.

== Respect and miracles ==
The king was highly respected by many, including the king of Tripura and Mr. Roberts, a British administrator in Sylhet, who called him “the very embodiment of righteousness.” Descendants of two famous Vaishnava saints, Nityananda Prabhu and Advaita Prabhu, said the king showed both strong devotion to Vaishnavism and the bravery of the great archer Partha Arjuna.

Nature seemed to honor the king’s greatness. A large banyan tree branch fell without wind, meteors appeared in the sky, and the god’s pet tiger died mysteriously on the Langmai Hills. The most strange event was a dream by Prince Labanyachandra, where the king attended Lord Krishna in Braja Brindavana. This scene is compared to Shakespeare’s line: “the heavens themselves blaze forth the death of princes.”

== Comparison and description ==
At the end, the writers describe the king as the incarnation of Narottam Thakur. His body was washed away by the rising tide, adding to his mystique.

They also compare him to several great figures:

- King Yudhishthira for his virtue,
- Brihaspati for intelligence,
- King Sibi for generosity,
- Kamadeva for beauty,
- King Vikramaditya for helping others,
- Lord Vishnu for forgiveness,
- Lord Shiva for giving great gifts.

Among Meitei kings, he is called like a “bird of paradise.”

== Style and language ==
The work is partly a travelogue, describing the king’s journey through different places, and is considered the first of its kind in Meitei literature.

The language is old-fashioned but pleasing, with many Indo-Aryan words mixed in. The sentences flow smoothly and use strong images. For example, the queens following the king describe themselves as “kites on strings flying unsteadily.”

== See also ==
- Takhel Ngamba
- Lanmi (Meitei culture)
