= Ahom–Meitei relations =

Cultural relationship between Assamese and Meitei traditions

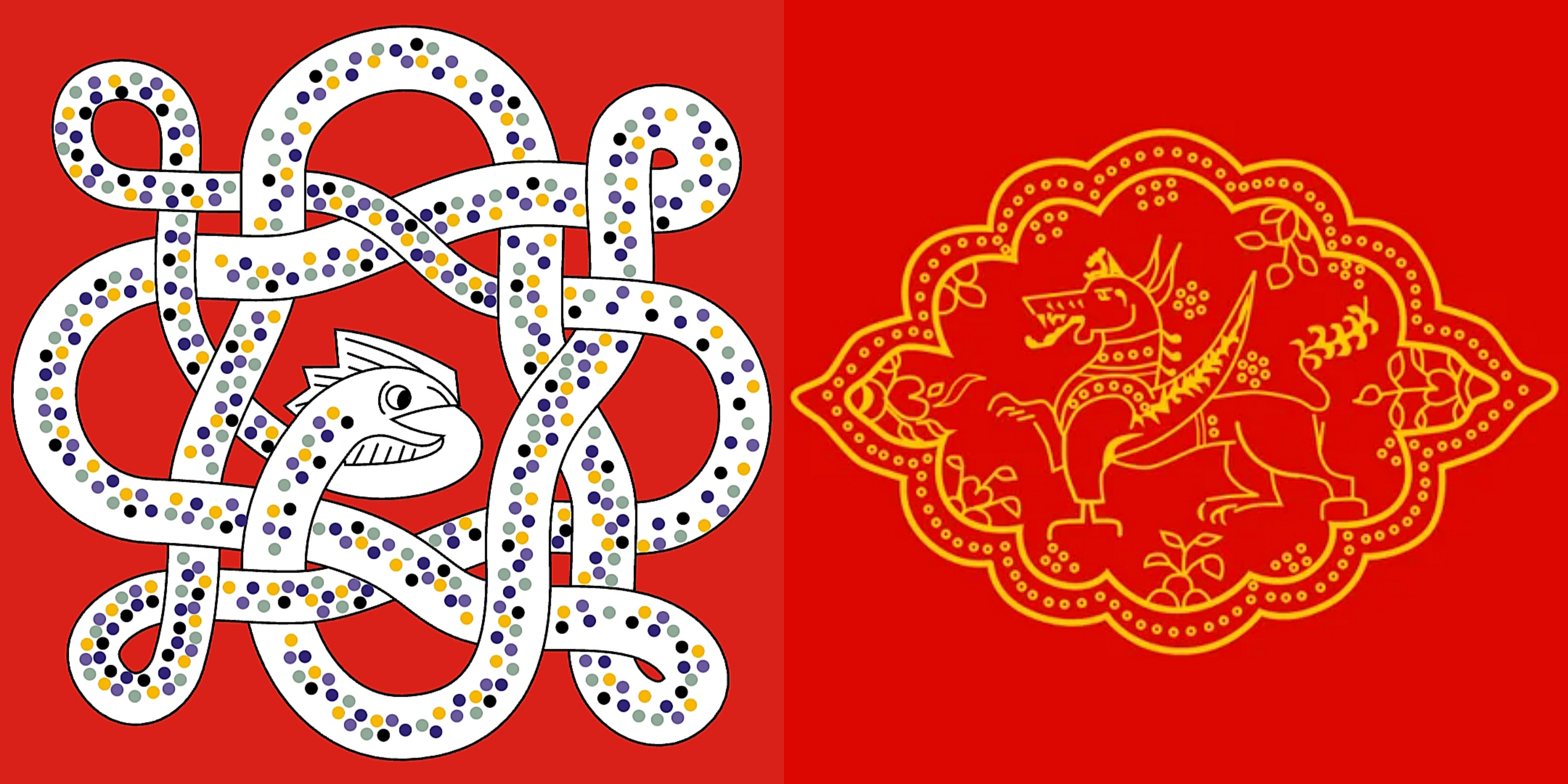
Imperial symbols of the Ningthouja dynasty (Meitei royalty) of Kangleipak (Kingdom of Manipur) and the Ahom dynasty of Assam

The Ahom people (alias Tai Ahoms) and Meitei people (alias Manipuris), integral to the histories of Assam and Manipur respectively, have a long history of political, cultural, and economic interactions. The Ahoms, of Tai origin, established the Ahom Kingdom, which later became the modern state of Assam. The Meiteis ruled the Kangleipak Kingdom, which evolved into present-day Manipur state. Their relationship involved trade, diplomatic exchanges, cultural interactions, and occasional conflicts, influenced by geographical proximity and shared cultural elements, contributing to the historical development of both regions.

According to scholar J. Roy, the relationship between the Ahom kingdom of Assam and the Meitei kingdom of Manipur was consistently cordial. A coin issued by Ahom king Swarga-deo Pramatha Singh in 1746 CE was discovered in Manipur, suggesting active commercial relations between the two kingdoms at that time. Despite Manipur facing invasions from neighboring states on various occasions, the Ahom kingdom did not engage in military actions against it. The Swargadeos, or Ahom rulers, maintained diplomatic alliances with the Meitei kings and had frequent marital ties with the Meitei royal family. However, following the usurpation of authority by the Burha Gohain, all forms of interaction with Manipur were suspended due to the latter's support for Gaurinath. This led to the blockage of trade routes and the cessation of commercial activities.

== Names given to each other ==
Both the Ahom people and their land are known as "Tekhao" (ꯇꯦꯈꯥꯎ) by the Meitei people, named after the Dikhow River (or Dikhou river), which flows in Assam.

When talking about the relationship between the Meitei people and other Tai ethnic groups, including the Tai Ahoms, the word "Meitei" (ꯃꯩꯇꯩ) or "Meetei" (ꯃꯤꯇꯩ) is sometimes written as "Mei Tai" or "Mee Tai."

== Common ancestry ==
Among the various theories of the origin of Ahoms and Meiteis, there is a traditional belief, among some group of people, that Pa-Khangba (ꯄꯥꯈꯪꯕ), the first historically recognized king of Manipur, is regarded as the common ancestor of the Tai-Ahom people of Assam and the Mee-Tai (original form of Meitei) people of Manipur. Both groups are considered branches of the broader Tai ethnic race and are classified as Mongoloid in terms of their anthropological characteristics.

As indigenous populations of India since ancient times, they are referred to as Indo-Mongoloid, indicating Mongoloid peoples residing in the Indian subcontinent. The Buranjis are ancient royal chronicles of the Ahom-Tai dynasty of Assam, written in archaic Tai scripts. The Mee-Tai people of Manipur possess their own historical records known as Pooya/Puya texts, written in traditional Mee-Tai scripts.

Notable texts such as Sorarel-Macha-Khun-Kumlol (ꯁꯣꯔꯥꯔꯦꯟ ꯃꯆꯥ ꯈꯨꯟꯀꯨꯝꯂꯣꯜ) and Thanglol Thangchat (ꯊꯥꯡꯂꯣꯟ ꯊꯥꯡꯆꯠ) document the lineage of Pa-Khangba, including his marriage to Leel-Leima (ꯂꯤꯜ ꯂꯩꯃ) of Mau-Shan (Pong). Their offspring became the first ruler of Mao-Shan. Pa-Khangba also married two additional women from Mao-Shan, resulting in three wives.

The Tai-Ahom people of Assam are referred to by the Mee-Tai as Te-Khao, a term derived from the clan names of Pa-Khangba’s second and third wives. This reference is found in the Yabirok, a local historical text.

The establishment of the Tai-Ahom kingdom in Assam is generally dated to 1228 CE Although the "Sorarel Macha" text recounts the founding of the Tai-Ahom dynasty, it does not specify the exact year of its establishment by Sukampha.

=== Belief of Meitei, Ahom & Naga common origin ===
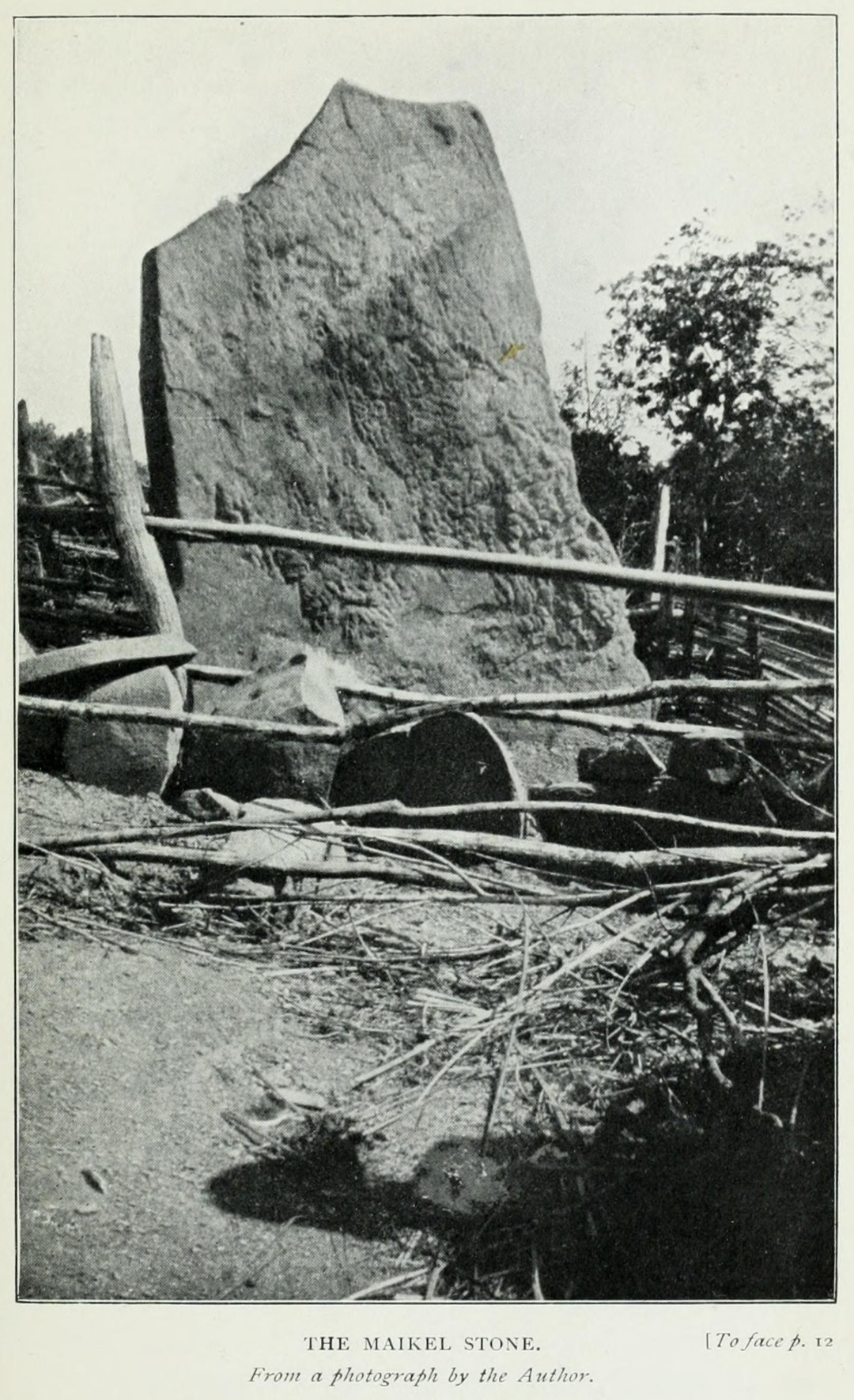
The celebrated Makhel Stone in Makhel village of Manipur (Kangleipak)

Puni Losii Mao, a research scholar on "Origin, Culture, and Political Development of Mao in Manipur," recounts a traditional narrative passed down by the elders of Makhel (ꯃꯈꯦꯜ). According to this story, Makhel was once inhabited by brothers who later migrated to different regions, leading to the formation of various communities.

One brother migrated to Assam and his descendants were known as the Ahoms, another settled in the plain of Manipur, and his descendants were known as the Meiteis, and a third remained in Makhel, whose descendants were known as the Maos (one of the several Naga tribes). Other Naga brothers, including the Tangkhul, Maram, and Poumai, also dispersed to different areas.

Before parting ways, the brothers held a final feast at Makhel. The Meitei progenitor provided a fish, the Ahom progenitor brought a rooster, and the Mao progenitor, along with others, contributed a Mithun (a large bovine species known as "Sandang" in Meitei language). After this shared meal, they departed to establish their respective communities.

As the Ahom ancestor left Makhel, he felled a large Uyok tree and carried the base part of the trunk with him. The Meitei ancestor, upon reaching the valley of Manipur, crossed the Barak River, where he rested on the riverbank, had a meal, and erected a stone that still exists today. Continuing his journey through Koubru Mountain, he reached Khonghampat, where he planted some Paan (Taro) on the ground. The Paan sprouted new leaves, and an egg he had brought from Makhel hatched into a large rooster. This observation led him to believe the area was suitable for settlement, prompting the establishment of communities in the valley of Manipur.

Before their separation, the brothers inscribed writings on a large stone known as the Makhel Stone. Over time, the inscriptions faded, making them unreadable. Additionally, the Ahom ancestor recorded inscriptions on leaves, while the hill communities (Nagas) used animal hides for writing.

The Makhel Stone remained a silent witness for generations but has come to symbolize a connection among the diverse communities of Manipur. The villagers of Makhel have acknowledged the importance of this heritage and expressed appreciation for government initiatives aimed at its preservation. Efforts are being made to protect the stone, ensuring that the site’s historical and cultural significance is maintained for future generations. The development of this heritage site has contributed to fostering a sense of unity among the communities.

==== Biren Singh's statement in Assam ====
In a historic meet in Assam, N Biren Singh, a former chief minister of Manipur state, stated that the Meiteis, Ahoms of Assam, and Nagas historically coexisted in harmony at Makhel village in Senapati district, Manipur. To commemorate this shared heritage, the Reunited Heritage Park of Manipur is planned to be established at the site.

== Early relationship ==
Gangmumei Kamei, in his book, "History of Manipur: Volume One Pre-Colonial Period", 1991, writes the following:

The contact between Manipur and Ahom kingdom of Assam was also seen during the reign of King Kabomba (1523-1542). Ahom was known to the Manipuris as Tekhao (derived from Dikhu River). A trade route to upper Assam was opened in 1536. The Ahom chronicle records that "envoys were exchanged with the Raja of Manipur and presents were exchanged."

— Gangmumei Kamei

== Matrimonial alliances ==
Medieval Assamese historical records also document matrimonial alliances between the kingdoms of Assam and Manipur, highlighting the interconnection between these regions.

After regaining his throne with the Ahom king's help, Meitei king Jai Singh of Manipur expressed gratitude to Swargadeo Rajeswar Singh, acknowledging that his restoration was facilitated by the Ahom kingdom’s assistance. As part of a diplomatic gesture to strengthen ties between the two kingdoms, Jai Singh agreed to a marriage alliance, offering his brother Gour Shyam’s daughter, Kuranganayani (ꯀꯨꯔꯪꯒꯅꯌꯅꯤ), in marriage to the Ahom king.

The Ahom king accepted the proposal, and Kuranganayani was sent to Gargaon with ceremonial honors, accompanied by key figures such as Sammath Borah, Manipuri Kotoki Shiramoni, Nanangk, and other gifts. Upon receiving the news, Swargadeo Rajeswar Singh dispatched his senior officials to Tengabari to receive the princess with due respect and personally went to Sonari town to await her arrival.

Kuranganayani, although the daughter of Gour Shyam, was adopted by Jai Singh and was recognized for her exceptional beauty, courage, and political acumen. She was highly regarded for her intelligence and diplomatic skills.

In the meantime, a contingent of 200 Munihs (men) and Tirutas (women) arrived from Manipur, bringing horses and elephants. Swargadeo Rajeswar Singh ordered the construction of a royal palace near Sonari town, located on the banks of the Sonai River, approximately 12 miles west of Gaurisagar, near the Dihing River.

The chief official of the kingdom, Kirtichandra, performed the 'Chak-long' ceremony, formally giving Kuranganayani in marriage to the Swargadeo. The ceremony included the presentation of golden garments, ornaments, and other gifts.

To commemorate the occasion, the Swargadeo established a 'ghat' on the banks of the Sonai River, naming it 'Maglau Ghat' (meaning "Manipuri Ghat"), which is now known as 'Malau Ghat'. A pond was also dug for drinking water and named 'Maglau Pukhuri'.

Kuranganayani was conferred the title of 'Rajmaharshi' (Queen) by the Swargadeo. She quickly became an influential figure in the Ahom court, earning the trust of the administration and playing a significant role in the kingdom’s governance.

== Kuranganayani's restoration of the Ahom government ==
Meitei Princess Kuranganayani of Manipur kingdom was married to Ahom King Rajeswar Singh and became his principal queen. Following Rajeswar Singh's death in 1769, the Moamaria, a Vaishnavite religious sect, launched a rebellion against his brother and successor, Lakshmi Singh. The rebels managed to capture the capital city of Rangpur and temporarily displace the Ahom government.

During this period, Ragha Moran, a leading figure in the rebellion, mistreated Kuranganayani. In a covert operation with the support of Lakshmi Singh’s loyalists, she stabbed Ragha Moran just below the calf with a sword during the Bihu festival. Royalist forces, disguised as Bihu performers, were present and assisted in killing him, effectively completing the operation.

Subsequently, the young women gathered by Ragha Moran in the palace joined the attack, participating in the killing of his family members. Lakshmi Singh successfully regained the throne, and Kuranganayani's contributions were publicly acknowledged. She was formally reinstated with the status, privileges, and dignity of a principal queen.

== Ahom assistance to the Meiteis ==
The Burmese king Alaungpaya invaded Manipur and defeated the local king in a battle near Pallel, subsequently capturing the capital. However, after learning of a rebellion in Maandesh (present-day Myanmar), he departed from Manipur after a brief stay of approximately 13 days. During this period, the Manipuri king, Jai Singh, sought assistance from the East India Company, which had established control over parts of India. Although Company soldiers arrived from Chittagong, they eventually withdrew due to political considerations.

Jai Singh regained the throne of Manipur, but in 1765, the Burmese invaded once again, capturing the kingdom. Jai Singh fled to Cachar, while the Burmese installed a puppet ruler named Iringba and subjected the Manipuri population to harsh treatment before returning to Burma.

Subsequently, Jai Singh returned to Manipur, deposed Iringba, and resumed control of the kingdom. However, when the Burmese launched another invasion, Jai Singh was defeated at Langthabal and fled to Assam. The Burmese then installed Khairang as the new king of Manipur before retreating.

Seeking support, Jai Singh approached the Ahom king, Swargadeo Rajeswar Singh, through a letter. After consulting his ministers, the Swargadeo summoned Jai Singh to Rangpur. Jai Singh arrived with 4,000 Paik guards and was accommodated near the Dikhow River.

Following discussions, Swargadeo appointed Harnath Borbaruah, the grandson of Rangachila Borbaruah, as the commander of an expedition to Manipur. He was tasked with leading 40,000 soldiers, accompanied by Jai Singh, who was responsible for guiding the army to Manipur. They chose an alternate route via Diphu, bypassing the traditional Nagaon Raha gate. This new path was challenging due to dense forests and thick creepers, causing significant hardships. Many soldiers fell ill, and some died during the journey. The campaign, known as the 'Lata Kata Ran,' concluded on June 5, 1766, when Harnath Borbaruah returned with only a few soldiers.

The advance of Ahom forces was reported to the Burmese king, who then retreated from Manipur. However, upon the Ahom army's withdrawal, the Burmese reoccupied the kingdom. Jai Singh once again sought help from the Ahom king. This time, Uma Khangia Phukan was appointed as the commander of a new expedition with 30,000 soldiers. Using the traditional route, Khangia Phukan successfully destroyed three Burmese forts, forcing the Burmese to retreat.

Distrusting the Burmese king, Khangia Phukan assigned Jai Singh a contingent of 10,000 Assamese soldiers, along with Nagas and Manipuri deserters, to secure the throne. The Assamese forces were instructed not to return until Jai Singh had established permanent control over Manipur. Jai Singh expelled Kelemba, the Burmese-installed king, and reclaimed the kingdom.

Later, Jai Singh’s two sons, Madhusudan and Labanya-chandra, were captured during warfare and taken to Manipur. However, Jai Singh orchestrated their rescue and expelled the Burmese once again. Following these events, the Ahom king directed the Phukans to gather intelligence on Manipur’s situation. In response, Monmath Borah was sent with 200 soldiers to Manipur for reconnaissance.

== Meitei assistance to the Ahoms ==
King Lakshmi Singh of the Ahom kingdom died in 1780 following a period of internal strife. During his successor, Gaurinath Singh’s reign, the Moamaria revolt, which had briefly surfaced earlier, escalated once again significantly. The revolt of April 21, 1783, was subdued with considerable difficulty, but a renewed uprising in 1786 under a new leader proved even more challenging to control.

On January 19, 1788, King Gaurinath fled from Rangpur to Guwahati, where he remained for six years. He dispatched envoys to the rulers of Cachar, Jaintia, and Manipur seeking military assistance. The responses from the kings of Jaintia and Cachar were non-committal.

According to Jyotirmoy Roy in "History of Manipur (1958)", the Meitei King of Manipur, Jai Singh (Bhagyachandra), recalling the support his uncle Rajeswar had received from Gaurinath, led a force of 500 cavalry and 4,000 infantry to Nowgong, where he was received by Gaurinath. The combined forces then advanced to support Burha Gohain. Upon encountering the Moamaria forces, a battle ensued, resulting in a defeat for Gaurinath’s army with significant casualties. Following the engagement, Jai Singh promptly returned to Manipur, leaving 1,000 of his troops with Burha Gohain.

In 1794, Major Wood, during his time in Assam, observed a Meitei contingent of Manipur troops aiding Gaurinath, who had been reinstated with the support of British forces.

== Artworks ==
Many artworks by Rajkumar Chandrajit Sana Singh (RKCS) focus on the historical relationship between the Ahom people and the Meitei people, illustrating a significant event from their shared history. Using traditional Meitei painting techniques, RKCS depicts the figure of Kuranganayani, a Meitei princess who became the queen of the Ahom kingdom and played a role in the kingdom’s political conflicts.

The painting shows Kuranganayani assassinating Ragha Moran, a rebel leader who had seized the throne from Ahom king Lakshmi Singha. This event reflects the political dynamics of the period and underscores the historical connections between the Meitei and Ahom royal families. Lakshmi Singha ascended to the throne in 1769 following the death of his brother, Rajeswar Singha, who was married to Kurangunayani. Their marriage represents a key link between the two regions, which RKCS highlights through his depiction of this historical narrative.

== Legal statuses ==
Both the Tai Ahoms of Assam and the Meitei people of Manipur are asking for Schedule Tribe (ST) status, but the Central government of India has not yet added them to the ST list.

== See also ==
- Meitei people in Assam
  - Meitei language in Assam
- Burmese invasions of Assam
- Seven Years Devastation (Chahi Taret Khuntakpa)
- Meitei–Shan relations
- Meitei people in Myanmar
  - Meitei clothing in Myanmar
- Meitei people in Bangladesh
  - Meitei monuments in Bangladesh
- Meitei people in Tripura
- Meitei people in Meghalaya
- Meitei martial arts
- Meitei traditional weapons
- Meitei traditional toys
- Meitei traditional games

== Bibliography ==
- Baruah, S. L. (1993), Last Days of Ahom Monarchy, New Delhi
- Devi, Lakshmi (1968), Ahom-tribal Relations, the University of Michigan
- Baruah, S L (1985), A Comprehensive History of Assam, Munshiram Manoharlal
- Gogoi, Padmeshwar (1968), The Tai and the Tai kingdoms, Gauhati University, Guwahati
- Gait, E.A. (1906), A History of Assam, Thacker, Spink & Company
