= Meitei–Shan relations =

Cultural relationship between Meitei and Shan traditions

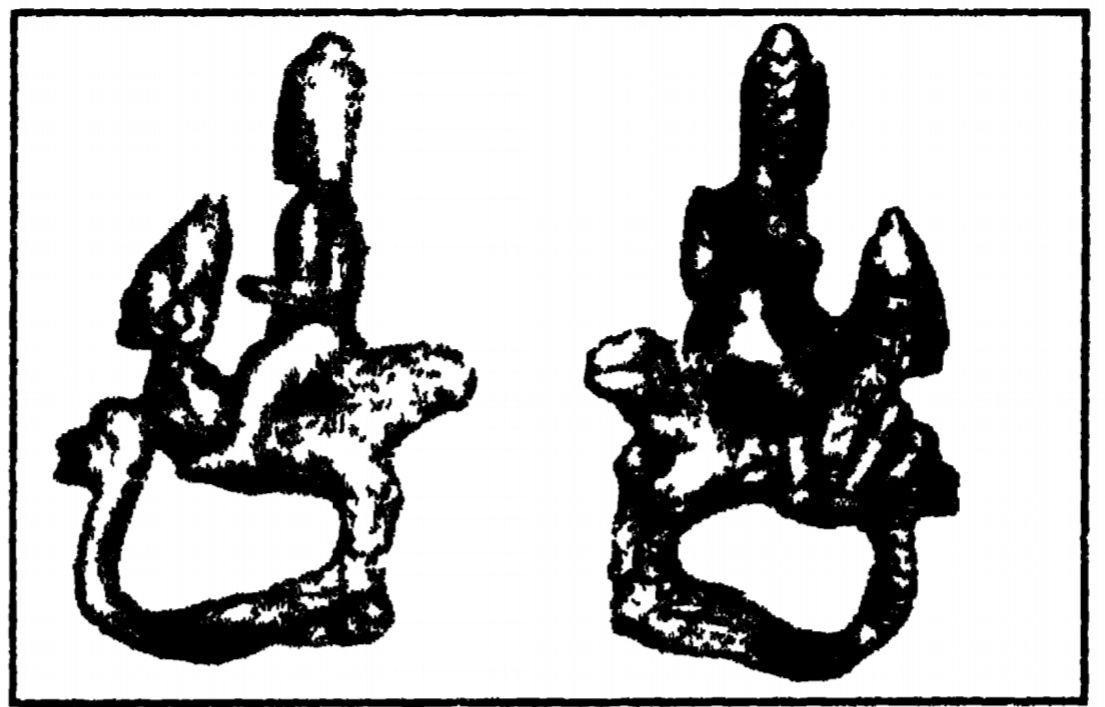
A gift from the Shan King of Pong presented to the Meitei King of Kangleipak in 1470 CE

The historical relationship between the Meitei people (alias Manipuris) of the Kingdom of Kangleipak, later known as Manipur (largely in modern day northeastern India), and the Shan people of the Pong Kingdom (largely in modern day Myanmar/Burma) was characterized by extensive cultural exchanges, diplomatic interactions, and mutual influence. While political boundaries defined the kingdoms, the interactions between the people—through royal marriages, trade relations, shared festivals, and diplomatic missions—played a significant role in shaping their social, cultural, and linguistic landscapes. Events such as the international boundary treaty of 1470 were not merely political agreements but also reflected the personal and communal ties that developed over time. This relationship facilitated the exchange of traditions, languages, and customs, leaving a lasting impact on the cultural heritage of both communities. Shan people are known as "Pong" by the Meiteis, named after their homeland, kingdom of Pong.

== Pong King's visit to Meitei kingdom ==
The first written records of the connection between the Pong and Meitei kingdoms come from the reign of Meitei king Naothingkhong. General Samlongpha, the brother of Pong King Sookampa, conquered the Bhuma principality in the east, along with the cities of Basa King (Kachar) and Tripura. After these victories, Samlongpha came to Meitei kingdom in 7th century CE. Both the Meitei Royal Chronicle and the Pong records mention that Samlongpha stayed in Manipur for 10 years.

After conquering Kachar, Samlongpha entered Meitei kingdom by crossing the Gwai River, going through the Khebu Hills, and reaching the Ngapram Hills. He avoided the Manipur Valley because he was concerned that his army might damage the farmland there. Instead, he took paths along the hills toward the origin of the Thoubal River. Most of his army was sent to Assam to see if it was possible to conquer that region.

Samlongpha came to Manipur and stayed for 10 years in Pong village, which is just east of the present day Kangla palace. He was with some nobles and soldiers, while most of his army went to Assam to plan further conquests. Samlongpha’s conquest of Moirang is believable because Moirang was an independent and important principality with borders leading towards Burma. Because of the friendly relations between the two kingdoms, Samlongpha avoided the Meitei kingdom and took a route to Assam through hillside paths. The fact that he stayed near the palace suggests he was a guest of the Meitei Kingdom.

== Pong Embassy to the Meitei King ==
In 1470, Pong King Suhonghpa (also known as Suhungkham) dispatched an emissary named Chao-Langhai to the court of the Meitei King Kyamba. The purpose of this diplomatic mission was to request the hand of a Meitei princess in marriage. The Meitei King accepted the proposal but informed Chao-Langhai that the marriage could not proceed immediately due to the absence of a suitable princess. He requested that the emissary return after one year.

After careful consideration, the Meitei King decided to send a Sekta girl, known as Sekmu Urabi, to fulfill the request. She was escorted by Chao-Langhai and his party. However, during their journey near the Sekmu foothills (Sekmu Ching Khong), the princess was abducted by the chief of Khampat and his men, who had laid an ambush. Despite the kidnapping, Chao-Langhai managed to escape and returned to the Pong capital, where he reported the incident to King Suhonghpa.

Outraged by the kidnapping, King Suhonghpa resolved to launch a military campaign against Khampat and sought the Meitei King’s support for a joint invasion. He sent another emissary to the Meitei court to propose an alliance, recounting the events and requesting military cooperation. As a symbol of their agreement, the Pong King presented a bunch of Khongkan Melei Urei (Khongkan Melei orchids) brought from Pong. The orchids were divided into two parts: one part was given to the Meitei King, while the other was kept by the emissary. The two rulers agreed to meet for the military campaign when the orchids began to sprout new stems, signifying the readiness to initiate the invasion.

When the orchids began to grow, the Pong King marched toward the Kabow Valley with his forces to commence the invasion of Khampat. However, the Meitei King was delayed due to the colder climate of his homeland compared to Mungkong (Mogaung or Mungmao). Eventually, the two kings met on the way and proceeded together toward Khampat.

== Joint Invasion of Khampat ==
Upon reaching Khampat, the Pong King proposed a strategy: the Meitei King would attack the fort from the western side, while he would approach from the east. Both armies constructed fortifications in preparation for a prolonged siege. Despite their efforts, the Khampat fort proved difficult to breach due to its strong defenses.

During the siege, the sound of paddy pounding and singing from within the fort suggested that the Khampat people were well-supplied. However, an old woman, emaciated and starving, managed to escape from the fort and approached the besieging armies. She pleaded for food and revealed that Khampat was suffering from severe food shortages. The sounds of pounding were not from paddy but from pebbles and husked paddy bran, intended to create the illusion of abundance. She informed the commanders that Khampat was on the verge of surrender.

The old woman was provided with food, and based on her information, the Pong King devised a new strategy. He proposed that the Meitei King’s forces dig a tunnel from the western side to enter the fort under the cover of darkness, while his own troops would attack from the east. The next morning, they would determine who had succeeded in entering the fort first.

That night, the Meitei King’s forces managed to breach the fort, devastating the Khampat camps. The Pong King’s army arrived the following morning, joining in the victory. The Khampat King fled on a white elephant, while his queen and two sons, Kaikhang and Kaimang, escaped in a vehicle (gari) and eventually reached Mung-O-Mangtra.

With the fort completely destroyed and reduced to ashes, a victory ceremony was held. A large hall was constructed within the ruins, and a grand throne was installed. Both the Pong King and the Meitei King sat together, sharing a royal plate during the celebration of their joint triumph over Khampat.

== Naming of the Two Kings after the victorious Battle of Khampat (1470 CE) ==
Following the successful joint military campaign against Khampat in 1470 AD, Pong King Suhonghpa and Meitei King Kyamba conducted a formal victory ceremony, during which they conferred new titles upon themselves in recognition of their roles in the campaign.

The Pong King Suhonghpa was given the title "Chaopha-hum Kekhomba," while the Meitei King Kyamba was honored with the title "Chaopha-hom Kingyamba." These titles were associated with Kiang-Khambat, the region encompassing the capital town of Khampat, which was the principal city of the Khampat section or principality in the Kabow Valley, situated along the banks of the Khampat River.

=== Presentation Ceremonies ===
In recognition of the Meitei King’s contributions during the campaign, the Pong King organized a presentation ceremony, offering a series of valuable gifts to King Kyamba. The gifts included:

1. A gold senpot adorned with a thousand diamonds (Tampha lising ama thinba).
2. A gold betal box (kwagok).
3. A silver betal box (kwagok).
4. A betal box for storing matured fruits.
5. A gold kong-khao (a ceremonial item).
6. A plate for placing the gold kong-khao.
7. A gold pad for holding the gold plate.
8. A brass plate.
9. A silver plate.
10. A gold khujai (a decorative item).
11. A silver khujai.
12. A gold khuteisen (a ceremonial ornament).
13. A silver khuteisen.
14. A three-pointed gold sword.
15. A gold armpit ornament (tal in Manipuri), engraved with dragon designs.
16. A gold throne with four legs.
17. A three-storied umbrella (Sekpil mathol ahum longba).
18. Two Kanghei white hand fans (made from materials such as Humai and Chamor).
19. A complete set of the King's royal attire (Ningthougi Potloi Suna).

In return, the Meitei King Kyamba offered the following gifts:

1. A Sangkai (a ceremonial item or valued object).
2. A cock (possibly as a symbolic offering).
3. Two Sandang (Mithun), large domesticated animals considered valuable in the region.

However, feeling that these gifts were insufficient to express his respect and gratitude, the Meitei King removed his own shirt and presented it to the Pong King. This act of personal offering was deeply appreciated by the Pong King, who expressed his satisfaction with the gesture.

In recognition of this act, the Pong King, Chaopha-Hum Kekhomba, publicly reaffirmed the Meitei King’s title as "Chaopha-hom Kingyamba" before the assembled audience, officially concluding the victory celebration.

== Boundary Demarcation Between the Shan Kingdom of Pong and the Meitei Kingdom (1470 CE) ==
Following the victory over Khampat in 1470 CE, Pong King Chaopha-hum Kekhomba and Meitei King Chaopha-hom Kingyamba (Kyamba) met to formalize the territorial boundaries between their respective kingdoms. This event is historically recognized as the Boundary Treaty of Meitei-Pong of 1470, marking an important diplomatic agreement in the region's history.

The boundary demarcation took place the following morning. Both monarchs, accompanied by their entourages, traveled to key locations to establish the agreed-upon borders. The territory of the Meitei Kingdom was defined as follows:

1. Southern Boundary: Extending to Mratong, marked by the area of the celebrated Dwarf Mango tree.
2. Eastern Boundary: Reaching five days’ journey beyond the Chindwin (Ningthee) River, bordered by the Loichari Hills.
3. Northern Boundary: Defined by the Dwarf Mango areas of Munghkam-Mungwang.
4. Western Boundary: Extending to the land where the sun sets.

It is noteworthy that the demarcation occurred in the eastern region, while the Meitei Kingdom, known at the time as the dominion of the Meitei King, was located further west.

After completing the boundary assessment, both royal parties returned to Songhsuk (referred to as Samjok by the Shan and Thuangdoot in Burmese contexts), where they encamped for the night. During the evening, Meitei King Kyamba overheard a conversation between a Shan commoner (referred to as Samjok) and a Meitei individual. The Shan man claimed that although the Pong King had granted Songhsuk to the Meiteis, they would not become subjects or servants of the Meitei people.

Disturbed by this conversation, King Kyamba promptly met with Pong King Chaopha-hum Kekhomba the following morning to address the issue. He inquired whether the land granted by the Pong King, referred to as Epu, included Songhsuk.

The Pong King responded that he had granted land extending to the Loichari Hills in the east, which was significantly farther from Songhsuk. He implied, with a slight smile, that the Meitei King’s concern was unwarranted, subtly suggesting that his counterpart was being overly cautious.

The Pong King then proposed a compromise: if the Meitei King was uncomfortable with Songhsuk being within the granted territory, it could serve as a meeting place for diplomatic visits. However, the Pong King asserted that all tributes from the region would still be received by the Meitei King.

Following this discussion, the two kings proceeded to the Dwarf Mango tree area, where they sat beneath the large, two-branched mango tree, shared a meal, and discussed their respective journeys back to their capitals.

Tragically, the royal cooks—Pong King’s maid cook and Meitei King’s cook Koiremba, who were husband and wife—had been secretly in love since their first meeting during the royal itinerary. Fearing that the two kings would never permit them to live together due to their statuses as servants, the couple decided to end their lives. They tied themselves together with a cloth, secured a heavy stone, and drowned in a nearby water body, fulfilling their pre-determined pact. Their tragic end reflects the personal sacrifices made amidst the political and diplomatic affairs of the time.

== Diplomatic Exchanges and the Departure of the Kings (1470 CE) ==
Following the formalization of the boundary treaty between the Shan Kingdom of Pong and the Meitei Kingdom in 1470 AD, Pong King Chaopha-hum Kekhomba and Meitei King Chaopha-hom Kingyamba (Kyamba) engaged in further diplomatic exchanges characterized by mutual respect and customary gifts.

=== Requests and Gifts ===
King Kyamba, addressing Pong King Chaopha-hum Kekhomba as "Epu" (a term denoting respect and affection), requested the trumpet blower (Pere Khongba), a ceremonial musician from the Pong royal court. This request was granted without hesitation. In return, the Pong King requested the services of the Langte Drummer (Langte Pung Yeiba), a distinguished drummer from Sekta Village, commonly referred to as Pungyeib-O. This request was also accepted willingly.

=== Farewell Wishes ===
As the time of departure approached, the Pong King extended his heartfelt wishes to King Kyamba, expressing hopes for his safe return to his capital and a long, prosperous reign. He also acknowledged the strength of their friendship, hoping that it would be remembered in the years to come.

During their conversation, the Pong King reflected on their respective reigns:

In the year Kapchao (1470 AD), the Pong King was 37 years old and had ascended the throne after three coronations, having reigned for 30 years.

King Kyamba was 27 years old at the time, with only three years on the throne.

The Pong King expressed his desire for Kyamba’s reign to be marked by prosperity and grandeur, with their shared experiences cherished as a testament to their diplomatic alliance.

=== Historical Context and Departure ===
The meeting between the two kings is recorded to have taken place in the year Kapchou (1470 CE), though some historians, including Pemberton, suggest the year might have been 1474, based on comparisons with Burmese and Myanma historical records.

Following their farewell, both kings returned to their respective capitals.

=== Subsequent Reigns and Deaths ===
Pong King Chaopha-hum Kekhomba continued his reign for an extraordinary 70 years, dying in the year Kamou Lakli (approximately 1512–1513 CE, according to Pemberton).

Meitei King Kyamba reigned for 40 years, during which he implemented significant military campaigns and administrative reforms. He died in 1508 at the age of 64.

During Kyamba’s reign, many Shan people from the Kabaw Valley were integrated into Meitei society, contributing to the cultural and social fabric of the Meitei Kingdom. This era is remembered for its strong diplomatic relations, military alliances, and the enduring legacy of the friendship between the Pong and Meitei kingdoms.

== See also ==
- Burmese–Meitei relations
- Meitei people in Myanmar
- Meitei clothing in Myanmar

== Bibliography ==
- Shan (Pong) Relationship with Meitei: Mongmaorung, The Splendid Capital of The Kingdom of Pong at imphaltimes.com
- How Khagi (Yunnan) Sacked Pong (Shan) Through Guiles as per Ancient Meitei Chronicle ‘Soraren Macha Khunkumba’ at imphaltimes.com
- Shan (Pong) Relationship with Meitei: Mongmaorung, The Splendid Capital of The Kingdom of Pong at imphalreviews.in
- B. R.Pemberton- “The Eastern Frontier of India”,1835, reproduced in 1998, New Delhi
- N. Khelchandra Singh, “Ariba Manipuri Sahitya gi Itihas” (Manipuri),1969, Imphal
- Gangmumei Kamei, “History of Manipur, Vol One”, 1991, New Delhi,
- Brown, Statistical Account of Manipur” 1873, reproduced in 2001, New Delhi
- Ibungohal Singh and N.Khelchandra Singh, Cheitharol Kumbaba (Manipuri),1967,2nd edt 1989
- Oinam Bhogeshwar Singh, Ningthourol Lambuba,1967, Imphal
- L. Joychandra Singh, The Lost Kingdom, (Royal Chronicle of Manipur),1995, Imphal
- R. K. Jhalajit Singh, A Short History of Manipur, 1965, Imphal
- R. K. Sanahal Singh, A Short History of Manipur, 1989, Imphal
- W. Dun, Gazetteer of Manipur, 1886, reproduced 1992, Delhi
- N. Joykumar Singh, Emergence of Manipur as a Nation State,2015, New Delhi
- Konsam Manikchand Singh, Descent of the Scion of Sorarel on the Earth (Sorarel Machana Khulkumpa), 2014, Imphal
- Chanam Hemchandra, Ningthourol Lampupa, 2018, Imphal
- B. Kulachandra Sharma, 2000, Imphal, Manipur: “Mayamba Garibaniwaz”, 2000, Imphal
