= Mangka Mayanglambam =

Indian musical artist

- ꯃꯪꯀꯥ ꯃꯌꯥꯡꯂꯝꯕꯝ
- Born: Mangka; Manipur
- Citizenship: Indian
- Occupations: singer and musical artist
- Organization: Laihui
- Father: Mangangsana Mayanglambam
- Family: Mayanglambam

Mangka Mayanglambam (Meitei: ꯃꯪꯀꯥ ꯃꯌꯥꯡꯂꯝꯕꯝ) is an Indian Manipuri musical artist, folk singer, dancer, and pena player. She primarily works in the preservation, protection and promotion of traditional Meitei cultural folk and classical music as well as performing arts of Kangleipak (Meitei for 'Manipur') in the national and international platforms. Mangka is recognized as one of the few female pena players.

== Early life and education ==
Mangka was born in Imphal, Manipur, into a family of musicians. Her father, Mayanglambam Mangangsana Meitei, is a composer, musician, and founder of the Laihui Ensemble, and a recipient of the Bismillah Khan Yuva Puraskar. Her mother and brother are also involved in the arts.

From a young age, Mangka was surrounded by traditional music and dance. Artists often came to her home to practice Manipuri folk music, and this environment inspired her to sing and dance. She began her formal training under Guru Langathel Thoinu Devi, one of the last surviving performers of Moirang Sai, a traditional storytelling art form. She also trained with Padma Shri Guru Khangembam Mangi Singh and Guru Khumanthem Sundari.

Mangka holds a master's degree in Sociology from IGNOU and is a Visharad in Manipuri dance from Shree Shree Govindaji Nartanalaya.

== Career ==
Mangka began performing at an early age. Her first major recognition came in 2014 when she was the first Indian to represent the nation at the Asia-Pacific Broadcasting Union (ABU) Radio Song Festival in Colombo, Sri Lanka. Her performance of “Tamla Loibi,” written and composed by her father, received international attention.

Her early popularity began with her performance of the song “Hada Samaton” during the 8th Manipur International Polo Tournament in 2014. The song, written and composed by her father, was later broadcast on Doordarshan Imphal for ten days in a row. The performance received wide attention in Manipur and helped her become known as one of the leading young folk singers of the state.

She released her debut album Chingda Satpi in 2015, distributed worldwide by Times Music. Mangka has performed at festivals such as the Ziro Festival of Music in Arunachal Pradesh, where she presented contemporary and traditional Manipuri folk music. She is also a member of the Laihui Ensemble, where she works as a musician, researcher, and educator.

In 2017, she received the Prasar Bharati Doordarshan Annual Award and became an “A” Grade folk singer of All India Radio, Imphal. She is also an ICCR Empanelled Artiste.

== Musical style and art forms ==
Mangka performs various forms of Manipuri folk and classical music. She specializes in Moirang Sai, Basok, and Lai Haraoba music. Her performances often include singing, storytelling, and dance.

She is one of the few women in Manipur who play the pena, a single-stringed traditional instrument usually played by men. She also teaches the pena to her female students to keep the tradition alive.

Mangka's performances blend traditional Manipuri music with modern elements while maintaining the cultural essence of her art. She is known for performing in traditional attire and incorporating Manipuri dance movements into her acts.

== International collaborations ==
Mangka has collaborated with several international artists and projects, including projects with artists from Portugal, Wales, Japan, Hawaii, and Switzerland, blending Manipuri folk traditions with global contemporary styles.

=== Portugal collaboration ===
In 2017, she released Nura Pakhang (Eu e Tu), a collaboration with the Portuguese pop band Clã. The song was part of the project T(H)REE – A Musical Journey from Portugal to Asia.

=== India–UK collaboration ===
She worked with Welsh singer-producer Eadyth Crawford on the song RaRaReHei as part of the Ziro Focus project, a partnership between Ziro Festival of Music (India) and Focus Wales (UK), supported by the British Council’s India/UK Season of Culture. The song was released as an NFT and presented at international festivals including Focus Wales in 2022.

=== European tour ===
In April 2023, Mangka went on a tour of Switzerland and France, organized by the MaolKeki Foundation. She performed at multiple venues, including the India Day Event in Riehen, Basel, and the Caveau du Café Littéraire in Saint-Louis. Her father, Oja Mangangsana, accompanied her on the tour. The trip included collaborations with Swiss Alphorn player Enrico Lenzin and Franco-German artist Angela Sofia Sterzer.

== Awards and recognition ==
- Women’s Achiever Award 2025, presented by the Governor of Assam and organized by FICCI FLO Northeast.
- Prasar Bharati Doordarshan Annual Award (2017).
- State Icon Award, Manipur.
- A Grade Artiste of All India Radio, Imphal.
- Represented India at ABU Radio Song Festival (2014) in Colombo.

== Teaching and mentorship ==
Mangka teaches Manipuri folk music at the Laihui Performing Space in Imphal. She mentors around 300 students, many of them young girls who learn pena and folk performance under her guidance. She sees her students as her greatest achievement.

She aims to establish an academy for Manipuri folk music and culture to ensure traditional art forms are passed on to future generations.

== Legacy ==
In 2017, Mangka Mayanglambam was given the title “Princess of Manipur Folk Music” by Indian media and audiences. The title recognized her growing influence as a young artist who brought traditional Manipuri music to new audiences in India and abroad.

Mangka believes that folk music should be preserved and promoted in every community. She describes balancing sacred traditions with stage performances as a challenge.

As one of the few women breaking gender barriers in Manipuri folk music, she continues to inspire young artists. Mangka considers her mission not only to perform but also to teach and safeguard the cultural identity of Manipur through music.

== See also ==
- Meitei intangible cultural heritage
- Meitei ritual songs
- Ancient Meitei hymns
- Festival of Moirang Shai
- Pusparani Huidrom
- Sushmita Mangsatabam
