= Keisham Kuber =

- Born: July 17, 1958 (age 68); Top Khongnangkhong, Imphal East, Manipur, India
- Other names: Kuber Keisham; Kuber; Huis Laobi Kuber
- Education: Modern College, Imphal
- Occupations: Actor; comedian; writer; poet; environmental activist
- Years active: 1980s–present
- Children: 3
- Awards: Best Actor, All India Short Play Competition (2013); Best Actor, Langmeidong Dramatic Union (2004)

Keisham Kuber (born 17 July 1958), (Note: written as "ꯀꯩꯁꯥꯝ ꯀꯨꯕꯦꯔ" in Meitei language in Meitei script) or Kuber Keisham, (Note: written as "ꯀꯨꯕꯦꯔ ꯀꯩꯁꯥꯝ" in Meitei language in Meitei script) mononymously known as Kuber, (Note: written as "ꯀꯨꯕꯦꯔ" in Meitei language in Meitei script) is a veteran Indian actor, comedian, theatre artist, poet, short story writer, environmental activist, from Manipur. Known for his performances in Meitei language films, dramas, and the traditional Shumang Kumhei theatre, he has received public recognition for his humorous acting style. He is popularly known as "Huis Laobi Kuber" for his signature catchphrase “Huis! Huis!” in a Nokphade play Khangenphamda Ngairi. In the 2000s, Keisham Kuber became a well known figure in Meitei cinema’s digital era, often portraying roles in queer characters in comedic ways, showing humiliation, derogatory remarks, and ridicule, especially in movies including Eigidi Thawaini, Huranbado Mapuni, and Thajadaba Mitkuptuda, that reinforced stereotypes and contributed to the marginalization of the LGBTQ community, as the "objects of mockery". Other than onscreen activities, he is also known for working in environmental conservation efforts, like participating in the tree plantation drives.

== Early life and education ==
Keisham Kuber was born in Top Khongnangkhong, Imphal East, Manipur, to Keisham Gouramani Singh and Keisham Ongbi Leirikmacha Devi. He is the youngest of five siblings, with two sisters and two elder brothers. He completed his matriculation from Lamphel High School in 1978 and graduated from Modern College, Imphal in 1982. He is married and has three children: Kapil, Kapila, and Kripa.

== Career in acting ==
Kuber had a passion for writing poems and stories since his childhood. To enhance his storytelling skills, he began acting in proscenium theatre. He joined the People Art and Dramatic Association in his hometown and later worked with Panthoibi Natya Mandir from 1987, under the guidance of theatre director Yumnam Rajendra.

At Rajendra's suggestion, Kuber also studied other performance arts. He learned Manipuri classical dance at JN Manipur Dance Academy for 12 years and trained in Thang-Ta (traditional Meitei classical martial arts) under Keirao Sana.

=== Theatre career ===
During his time with the People Art and Dramatic Association, Kuber performed in several plays, including:

- Tas Chang Thok-ee
- Chingningi Sheirol
- Guru Dakhina
- Taramdai Korou
- Hanglai
- Mukti
- Manjagi Kangthol
- Ishanougi Kangkhul

=== Nokphade comedy series ===
Kuber joined the Nokphade comedy series in 1994, a project created by Ruhinikumar Thoudam. Although hesitant at first, he joined the cast starting from Volume 3 after the earlier volumes gained popularity.

He acted in Nokphade from Volume 3 to Volume 14, and is also part of Volume 15, scheduled for release soon. His character Baladeva, a submissive husband dominated by his wife Radha, was particularly popular in the play Khangenphamda Ngairi, dramatized by Ruhinikumar and based on Sorat Kana Solbigani, a story by Niladhaja Khuman.

Kuber credits both Ruhinikumar and Yumnam Rajendra for shaping his acting career.

=== Shumang Kumhei career ===
Kuber began performing in Shumang Kumhei (or Shumang Leela) theatrical performances in 2010, after being invited by playwright-director Ranjit Ningthouja. Initially reluctant due to his deep involvement in theatre, he finally agreed after obtaining permission from his theatre mentor, Yumnam Rajendra.

His debut Shumang Kumhei play was Phajabeegi Mapu, produced by North Imphal Manipur Jatra Mandal and performed at the Manipur State Shumang Leela Ningtham Kumhei 2010. He played the role of a Pung Yeiba (traditional Meitei drummer). His other performances include:

- Basantagi Mapao
- Loktak
- Meet Ani
- Sajibu Nongma Panba (playing as Lainingthou)

He continues to be an active member of the Shumang Leela community.

== Awards and honours ==
Kuber received several accolades for his acting:

- Best Actor award at the All India Short Play Competition, Allahabad (2013), for his role as Yongkham in Tas Chang Thok-ee.
- Best Actor award from Langmeidong Dramatic Union in 2004.
- Second prize for Best Actor for movie "Lalol-loidaba Lallonba" produced by Nokphade Cultural Foundation, awarded by the Langmeidong Dramatic Union (LDU) and the Manipur State Kala Akademi, Imphal, in the 48th Kha Manipur Drama Festival 2025.

== Writing career ==
Besides acting, Kuber is also a writer. He published a poetry book titled Mirang Thuraba Til in 1985. He has also written around 43 short stories, many of which were published in the Sanaleibak daily newspaper.

== See also ==
- Traditional Meitei theatre
- Modern Meitei theatre
- Meitei literature
- Oinam Bijando
- RK Hemabati
- Bishesh Huirem
- Beoncy Laishram
