= Manipur Polo International 2014 =

Polo tournament

Manipur Polo International 2014 or 8th Manipur International Polo Tournament was a polo tournament that was held in Imphal, Manipur, India. It was organised in Mapal Kangjeibung (Imphal Polo Ground), the oldest polo ground in the world.

The India-B team (Manipur team) won the trophy after defeating South Africa by 7-5 goals. USA won the third place after being defeated by South Africa by 6-7 goals. India-B team (Manipur team) defeated India-A team (Indian Polo Association team) by 7-6 goals.

In this year, Hada Samadon Ayangba is the theme song sung by Mangka Mayanglambam and presented by the Laihui Ensemble of Manipur.

== Participants ==
- France
- India
- Mongolia
- Poland
- South Africa
- Thailand
- United Kingdom
- United States
