= RK Hemabati =

RK Hemabati (ꯔꯥꯖꯀꯨꯃꯥꯔꯤ ꯍꯦꯃꯥꯕꯇꯤ, born 23 December 1954) is an Indian veteran actress from Manipur, known for her roles in Meitei language films and theatre. She gained early recognition for her performances as a lead actress in Manipuri cinema during the 1970s and later transitioned to character roles, particularly portraying maternal figures. Hemabati is also a writer and radio drama scriptwriter, with decades of contribution to the arts in Manipur.

== Early life and education ==
RK Hemabati was born in Nongmeibung Wangkheirakpam Leikai, Imphal, Manipur to R.K. Sanatomba and Ngangbisija Devi. She is the fourth of eight siblings. She completed her early education at Mutum Leikai LP School and passed her matriculation from Ananda Singh Higher Secondary School in 1970–71. She graduated from GP Women's College in 1975.

From a young age, Hemabati showed interest in the performing arts, including singing, dancing, and acting. Although she had a passion for singing, she did not pursue formal training due to the absence of a mentor.

== Career beginnings and social challenges ==
In traditional Manipuri society, women faced social stigma for pursuing careers in the performing arts. Despite the discouragement, Hemabati began performing in plays during her spare time. She faced criticism from society but remained dedicated to her passion for acting.

=== Film career ===
==== Debut and early roles ====
Hemabati made her film debut in 1976 with the lead role in Yairipok Thambalnu, which brought her widespread recognition in Manipuri cinema. Although her parents were initially hesitant about her acting career, they encouraged her to pursue it with determination.

She went on to appear in several Manipuri celluloid films, including Khonjel, Khamba Thoibi, Meichak, Thamoinadi Kouhouri, Amambasu Anganbani, and Aroiba Natte. Due to the high cost of producing films at the time, only a limited number were made, and Hemabati acted in nine such films.

==== Transition to digital films ====
Her first digital film was Thajabagi Wangmada. Initially hesitant to accept digital film roles, she eventually embraced them, believing that "art is art" regardless of format.

One of her most notable performances was in Thamoinadi Kouhouri, where she played a poor woman who suffers deep personal losses. The film, produced by Bright Films, remains one of her masterpieces. She has acted in approximately nine films under the Bright Films banner.

=== Character roles and "mother" figure ===
As she aged, Hemabati began accepting roles as a mother, though she initially found it emotionally difficult after playing heroine roles for many years. Before accepting such roles, she consulted with her family and peers.

== Theatre work ==
Although Hemabati began her career in films, she later joined the Manipur Dramatic Union (MDU) to improve her acting skills. She received training from various theatre instructors and performed in notable plays such as Khamba Thoibi, Sana Yathang, Samajgi Langlen, Bir Tikendrajit, and Puya Mei Thaba. She continues to act in selected theatrical productions.

== Television and radio ==
Hemabati has acted in over seven television plays, including Shambaldi Leihouri, Ipam Lamdam Lamnungshi, and Changyengduda. She has also performed in more than 100 radio plays. One of her most acclaimed roles is that of Poda, a widow, in the teleplay Changyengduda. She continues to play lead roles in radio dramas, where her voice acting remains highly appreciated.

== Writing career ==
Apart from acting, Hemabati is also a writer. She has written poetry, short stories, and scripts for radio dramas. Her radio play Angouba Leichil was broadcast by All India Radio (AIR) Imphal. In 2005, she published a collection of 21 short stories titled Chekla amadi Khonglembi.

== Recognition and awards ==
In recognition of her contributions to Manipuri cinema and theatre, RK Hemabati received the Best Supporting Actress Award at the 5th RJ Film Vision Special Awards in 2011, organized by the Film Academy Manipur (FAM).

== Personal life and career in government ==
Hemabati is married to Haobam Priyokumar, and they have two children—a daughter and a son. The family resides in Kangabam Leikai, Imphal. Outside her artistic career, she worked as an Inspector in the Economics and Statistics Department of the Government of Manipur. She joined the department in 1979 and retired in 2017.

== Later life and continued artistic pursuits ==
After her retirement, Hemabati began formal training in singing under noted artist Asem Boimola. She plans to continue engaging in artistic activities, especially singing and writing. Her favorite songs include Chita Thakki Kundo Pareng and Lairabibi Hainei Ima Nangbu.

== Selected filmography ==
- Yairipok Thambalnu (1984) - as Thambalnu
- Khamba Thoibi (1997) - as Khamnu
- Thamoinadi Kouhouri (2001)
- Kaboklei (2009)
- Nungshit Mapi (2015)
- TORO (2015)
- Mandalay Mathel (2017)
- Wakching Thagi Sanarei (2020)
- Ngamnaba Lanphamse (2024)
- Lonthoktaba Thamoi (2025)

== See also ==
- Mangka Mayanglambam
- OC Meira
