= Laiphangba =

- Khuman Ningthou
- Monarch: 570 CE – 620 CE
- Predecessor: Khomba Ningthouba
- Successor: Punshi Yumoiba
- Spouse: Nganurol Kaireima
- Issue: Punshi Yumoiba
Regnal name
- Adon Laiphangba
- House: Khuman dynasty
- Father: Khomba Ningthouba
- Religion: Sanamahism
- Occupation: Monarch

Adon Laiphangba (Old Manipuri: Aton Laiphangpa) was a king of the Khuman dynasty of Ancient Kangleipak (early Manipur). He reigned from 570 CE to 620 CE.

He was a contemporary of King Ura Konthouba of the Ningthouja dynasty (567-657 CE).

== Reign ==
In 575 CE, Laiphangba built Mayang Imphal as the second capital of the kingdom besides the already established capital at Thoubal. This was the start of dual-capital system of the Khuman kingdom.

During his time, the Khuman kingdom was extended westward which made the kingdom much more powerful.

His son, Punshi Yumoiba further developed Mayang Imphal, which made it grow stronger than the capital at Thoubal.

== See also ==
- Yumbanlol copper plate inscriptions
- Khuman dynasty
- Kangleipak
- Mayang Imphal
- Sanamahism
