= Yoithongai =

- Khuman Ningthou
- Monarch: 760 C.E – 800 C.E
- Predecessor: Senba Mimaba
- Successor: Haoramton
- Born: Yoithongai
- Spouse: Nganurol Kaireima
- Issue: Haoramhal, Haoramyai, Haoramton
- House: Khuman dynasty
- Father: Punshi Yumoiba
- Mother: Nganurol Chanu Khambi
- Religion: Sanamahism
- Occupation: Monarch

Yoithongai (also spelled Yoithongngai, Meitei: ꯌꯣꯢꯊꯣꯡꯉꯥꯏ) was a monarch of the Khuman dynasty in Ancient Kangleipak (present-day Manipur, India). He reigned from approximately 760 CE to 800 CE. He was a contemporary of Meitei kings Khongtekcha and Keirencha of the Ningthouja dynasty.

== Life and reign ==
Yoithongai was the son of King Punshi Yumoiba and Queen Nganurol Chanu Khambi. After Punshi Yumoiba's death around 700 CE, the throne was passed to Senba Mimaba, a maternal grandson from the Luwang dynasty. During Senba's rule, Yoithongai held the position of deputy king.

After Senba's death, Yoithongai led a successful rebellion and seized the throne in 760 CE. His accession marked the restoration of the Khuman dynasty's patrilineal line. As a result of this political shift, Senba's three sons fled the kingdom: the eldest, Laiku, relocated to Leitang; the second, Laikha, went to Uchiwa; and the youngest, Laipha, moved to the Maring region, where he assimilated with the local Maring people.

== Legacy ==
Yoithongai ruled until approximately 800 CE. He was succeeded by his youngest son, Haoramton. His reign is noted in the Khuman chronicles for reestablishing the paternal bloodline of the dynasty following the brief Luwang dominance.
