= Oinam family =

Meitei family name

House of Oinam
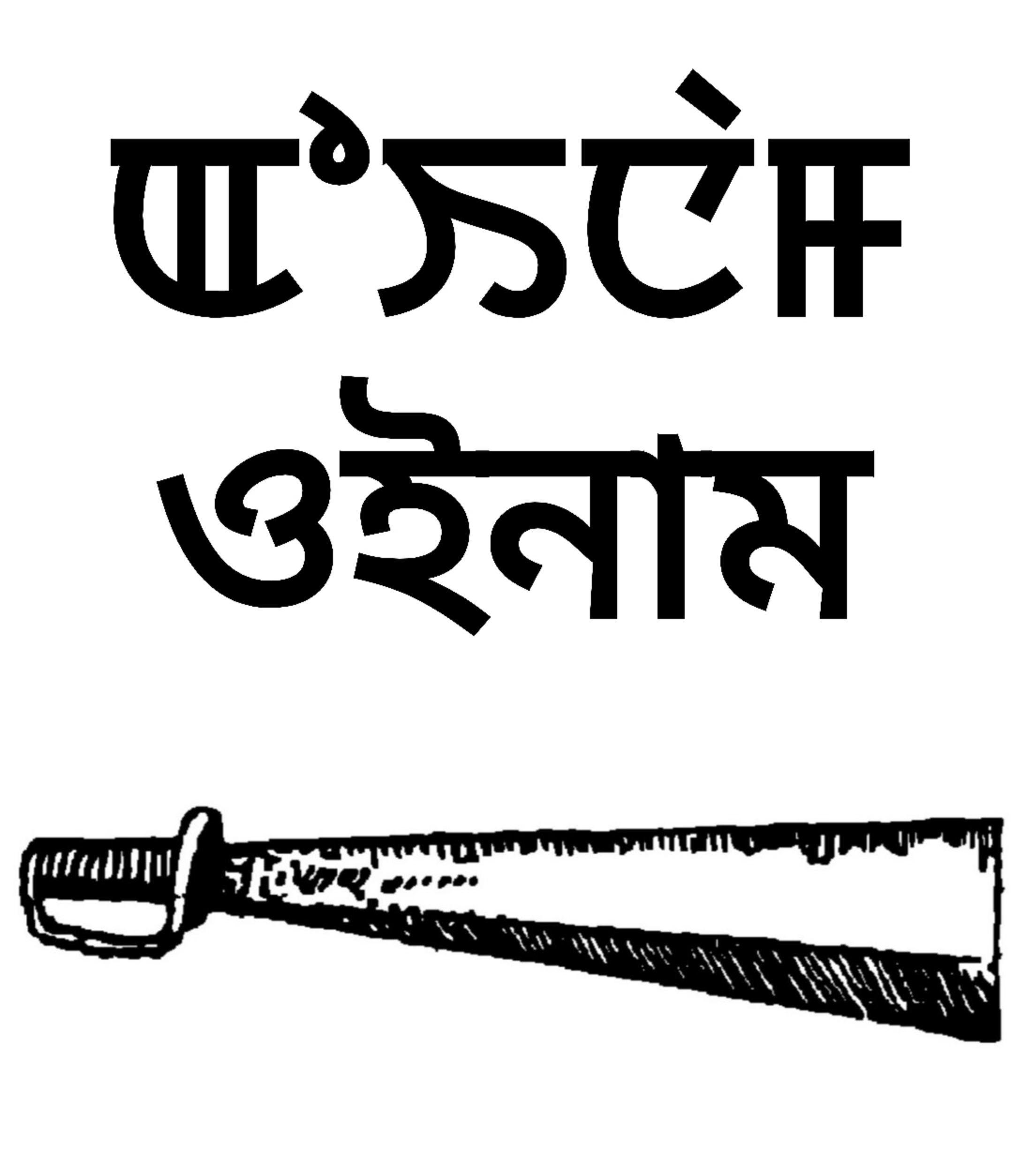
- House of Oinam, a branch of the Khuman dynasty (Classical Meetei Mayek and Eastern Nagari/Bengali transliterations)
- Pronunciation: oy-naam
- Language: oi-nām

Origin
- Language: Meitei language (Manipuri)
- Origin: Khuman dynasty (in particular sense) and Khuman clan (in broad sense)
- Derivation: Oina - Meitei root for "left handedness" and suffix "-m"
- Meaning: The left handed
- Region of origin: India (Manipur, Assam, Tripura), Myanmar and Bangladesh

Other names
- Alternative spelling: Oynam
- Variant form: Oinamcha
- Short forms: Oina, Oi
- Nickname: Oinamba

Oinam (Meitei: ꯑꯣꯢꯅꯥꯝ ꯁꯥꯒꯩ / ꯑꯣꯏꯅꯥꯝ ꯁꯥꯀꯩ, Old Manipuri: ꫡꯏꯅꯥꯝ ꯁꯥꯀꯩ) is a family belonging to a branch of the Khuman dynasty of the Meitei ethnicity (Manipuri ethnicity). Oinam Apokpa (also known as Oinam Pokpa) is an apokpa (clan ancestral deity) worshipped by the people (members) of the family, following or practising traditional Meitei religion (Sanamahism).

== Royal lineage ==
The House of Oinam family was founded by Prince Laikhangba (ꯂꯥꯏꯈꯪꯕ / ꯂꯥꯏꯈꯪꯄ) of the Khuman dynasty. He was the son of Prince Athingba (ꯑꯊꯤꯡꯕ / ꯑꯊꯤꯡꯄ), an uncrowned prince of the Khuman dynasty, and the grandson of King Thongleilom (ꯊꯣꯡꯂꯩꯂꯣꯝ), also known as Thongleirom (ꯊꯣꯡꯂꯩꯔꯣꯝ), a ruler of the Khuman Kingdom.

== Religious practices ==
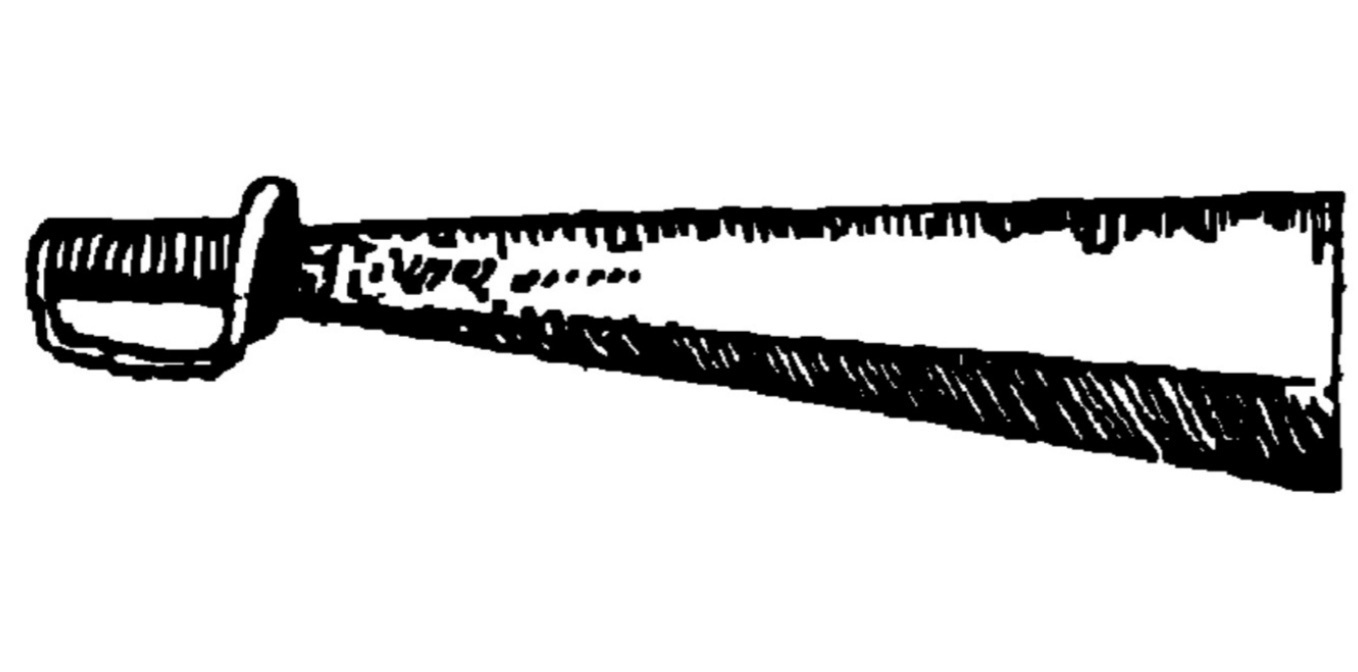
The sword of the Khumans is an essential element used during the Khuman Apokpa Khurumba (Khuman clan ancestor worshipping tradition)

Members of the Oinam Sagei (or Oinam family), practice ancestral worship as part of the traditional Meitei religion known as Sanamahism. They honor their familial ancestor, Oinam Apokpa (also called Oinam Pokpa), through a ritual tradition known as Sagei Apokpa Khurumba—a ceremony dedicated to the worship of one's family progenitor or Apokpa.

In addition to this, as part of the larger Khuman clan (Khuman Salai), the Oinam family also worships Khuman Apokpa (or Khumanpokpa), the ancestral figure of the entire Khuman clan. This form of worship, known as Salai Apokpa Khurumba, reflects the clan-level veneration of ancestors. Both forms of ancestor worship—at the family and clan levels—are integral practices within Sanamahism, the indigenous religion of the Meitei people.

== In Bangladesh ==
=== Early settlement ===
At the end of the 17th century A.D., members of the Meetei community belonging to the Oinam family settled in Bishgaon, located in present-day Bangladesh. By the middle of the 18th century A.D., their presence in the region had become well established.

=== Manuscript account ===
A handwritten manuscript has been discovered that provides important historical information about the settlement of the Oinam family, or Oinam Sagei, in Bangladesh. The document records the genealogy of a Manipuri family belonging to the Oinam lineage, currently residing in the Bishgaon area of Bangladesh.

According to the manuscript, the ancestors of this family—Maimu, Yauba, and Manglemba—migrated from Manipur. They first settled in the Cachar region and later moved to the areas of Bishgaon and Bhanugach in present-day Bangladesh. The manuscript states that the eleventh generation of Manglemba's lineage is now living in Bishgaon.

The original manuscript is believed to have been written by Bala Singh, who was the seventh-generation descendant of Manglemba. His name is the last listed in the original section of the genealogy. Later, the document was extended in a different handwriting, including the names of Mahendra (Bala Singh's son) and Durlav Singh (Mahendra's son). It is assumed that Durlav Singh added these entries. Durlav Singh had a son named Chhengoi Singh, whose family—including four sons and one daughter—is currently residing in Bishgaon. The eldest son, Ibonghal Singh, is reported to be 64 years old.

To estimate the date when the genealogy was written, a generational gap of 25 years was used for the past three generations, including Ibonghal Singh. Adding 64 years (Ibonghal's age) to 75 years (three generations), the genealogy was likely written 139 years ago.

Further analysis suggests that the family's ancestors settled in Bishgaon approximately 294 years ago. This estimate is based on the assumption of 10 generations (averaging 23 years per generation) plus the 64 years of Ibonghal's age. Manglemba, being the eleventh generation back, is assumed to have been an adult at the time of migration, so one generation is not counted in the calculation. This places the settlement around 1697 A.D., with an estimated margin of 20 years (1677–1717 A.D.).

This period overlaps with the reigns of Manipuri kings Paikhomba (1666–1697), Charairongba (1697–1709), and Garibniwaz (1709–1748). Based on this, it is likely that the migration and settlement of the Oinam family in Bangladesh took place during or before the reign of Garibniwaz.

The manuscript is currently in the possession of Oinam Ramendra, the youngest son of the family, who works as an engineer.

=== First Manipuri settlement in Chhotodhamai, Bangladesh ===
Chhotodhamai, located in the Moulvibazar district under the greater Sylhet region of Bangladesh, is a significant area inhabited by the Manipuri community. Within this region lies a place known as Manik Singh Bazar, which holds historical importance as an early site of Manipuri settlement.

According to local accounts, the first Manipuri settlers in this area established themselves at Manik Singh Bazar. The settlement was led by a man named Manik Singh, who is identified as an ancestor of the Bangladeshi Oinam family. He arrived in the area with a group of people and founded the initial settlement. In recognition of his role as the first settler, a local market eventually developed and was named Manik Singh Bazar in his honor.

Today, descendants of Oinam Manik Singh continue to live in Chhotodhamai. One of them is Oinam Bhuban Singh, who is currently 42 years old and identified as the sixth-generation descendant of Manik Singh. Using the standard generational estimate of 25 years per generation, the time of the original settlement can be calculated as approximately 167 years ago (42 + 25 × 5), placing it around the year 1824 A.D.

This period aligns with the historical timeframe known as the Seven-Year Devastation (1819–1826), a time of political turmoil and displacement in Manipur. It is therefore likely that the Oinam family's migration and settlement in Chhotodhamai occurred during or shortly after this event.

== Notable persons ==
Oinam family name can be used either as surname (after middle name) or forename (before middle name).

- Oinam Bhogeshwar Singh: Indian scholar, editor, and writer.
- Oinam Bijando: Royal court official in medieval Manipur kingdom.
- Binoranjan Oinam: Lyrist and music composer.
- Oinam Biramangol: Indian theatre artist and actor.
- Chana Lukhoi (originally, Oinam Lukhoi): Indian playwright, folk narrator, and cultural activist.
- Chaoba Devi Oinam: Indian sepak takraw player.
- Oinam Dilip: Indian Manipuri artist known for his paintings and solo exhibitions.
- Oinam Ibeyaima: The tallest woman in Manipur.
- Indira Oinam: Indian social activist and politician.
- Ethoi Oinam (Ithoi Oinam): Actress and model.
- James Oinam: Indian author.
- John Oinam: Indian singer.
- Laibi Oinam: First woman auto driver of Manipur.
- Oinam Bembem Devi: Indian footballer.
- Oinam Doren: Indian film maker and director.
- Oinam Gautam Singh: Film maker and director.
- Oinam Lukhoi Singh: Politician.
- Oinam Mangi: Indian stone sculptor.
- OC Meira: Indian filmmaker, journalist, and creative writer.
- Oinam Nabakishore Singh: Indian Administrative Service officer and politician.
- Oinam Romen Singh: Indian politician and social activist.
- Oinam Shilla Chanu: Indian police officer and beauty pageant participant.
- Oinam Swamikumar: Manipuri singer.
- Oinam Thoiba: Indian Shumang Leela (courtyard play) actor and director.

== Other websites ==
- Surnames Similar to Oinam
- Surnames similar to Oinam
