= Nokphade =

Nokphade (ꯅꯣꯛꯐꯗꯦ) is a Meitei language comedy series from Manipur, India, produced by the Nokphade Cultural Foundation. The series is known for its humorous performances, social awareness themes, and contributions to Manipuri cultural entertainment.

== History ==
=== 20th Anniversary ===
Nokphade celebrated its 20th anniversary on 24 September 2014 at Lamyanba Shanglen, Palace Compound, Imphal. Veteran comedians H. Manglem, M. Erabot, Babu Irengba, T. Jugeshwore, S. Syambabu, and L. Thoiba were honoured as luminaries of Manipuri comedy.

R.K. Film proprietor Ruhuni Kumar stated that the aim of the organisation was to produce new comedians in the state. He also announced plans to launch a website featuring profiles of comedians. During the event, the latest volume of Nokphade was released.

=== 25th Anniversary ===
The Nokphade Cultural Foundation celebrated its 25th anniversary on 25 September 2019 at Lamyanba Shanglen, Palace Compound, Imphal. The event was attended by Revenue Minister Karam Shyam and Shamurailatpam Naba Sharma, Coordinator of the Department of Art & Culture, Government of Manipur.

Karam Shyam praised the Nokphade team for its contributions to society and encouraged the foundation and its artists to produce more entertaining and educational content.

The Nokphade Ningshing Khudol 2019 awards were presented to the families of Leishangthem Dhanabir, Oinam Mangi, Th Thoithoi, Sh Hemanta, and G Gunna Sharma in recognition of their service, contributions, and talent.

== Street plays and social campaigns ==
Street play on community mobilisation

On 20 November 2025, the Nokphade Association performed a street play titled "Community Mobilisation and Media Activities at District Level" at Porompat Sabal Leikai High School and Thambalkhong Sabal Leikai. The event was jointly organised by the Zonal Education Officer, Zone II, Imphal East, and Samagra Shiksha (Elementary).

Campaign in Bishnupur relief camps

From 12 January to 4 February 2024, the Nokphade Cultural Foundation conducted a comedy campaign titled Wahang Mari to entertain residents of relief camps in Bishnupur district.

The campaign was sponsored by the Ministry of Health and Family Welfare and implemented under the guidance of the Manipur State AIDS Control Society. Internally displaced persons were informed about the HIV/AIDS Prevention and Control Act, 2017, the Ombudsman, and details regarding the disease.

== Felicitation of artists ==
On 25 September 2014, RK Films Imphal organised a felicitation programme for Nokphade artistes at Lamyanba Shanglen.

K Sobita commended the artistes for producing comedy plays based on social issues and for raising awareness for societal development. Thoudam Ruhini Kumar, a central figure in sustaining the comedy group for 20 years, stated that Nokphade provokes both laughter and reflection.

By that time, Nokphade had performed over 300 plays, and Nokphade Volume 13 had been released. Renowned artistes including K. Manglem, M. Irabot, Babu Irengbam, T. Jugeswar, S. Shyamkumar, and L. Thoiba were felicitated for their contributions. During the programme, Nokphade Volume 14 was released, and the Nokphade website was launched.

== Notable artists ==
=== Thokchom Surmangol ===
Thokchom Surmangol is a Manipuri comedian and actor known for his work in the Nokphade series and several feature films. He made his television debut in Part V of Nokphade and gradually established himself in comic roles in Manipuri cinema. Surmangol is recognized for his original style and storytelling abilities, contributing to the local entertainment scene. A resident of Thoubal Keshtri Leikai, he balances his professional career with family life and has two daughters.

=== Others ===
- Thokchom Joseph
- Rangilal
- Huis Laobi Kuber (Keisham Kuber)
- Bony Sharma (Bonny Sharma)

== Related pages ==
- Meitei cinema
- Cinema of Manipur
