= Auto Driver (2015 film) =

Manipuri documentary film

- Directed by: Meena Longjam
- Starring: Laibi Oinam
- Release date: 2015 (63rd National Film Awards)
- Running time: 30 minutes

Auto Driver is a 2015 Manipuri documentary film directed by Meena Longjam. It tells the story of Laibi Oinam who took to driving a second-hand auto rickshaw in 2011, in a non-traditional profession for women in the Imphal city of Manipur, in order to support her ailing husband and sons' education. Produced over three years, it won the best social issue film in the non-feature category at the 63rd National Film Awards in 2015 and Best Short Documentary in the Audience Choice category at the 2017 Women's Voices Now Film Festival.

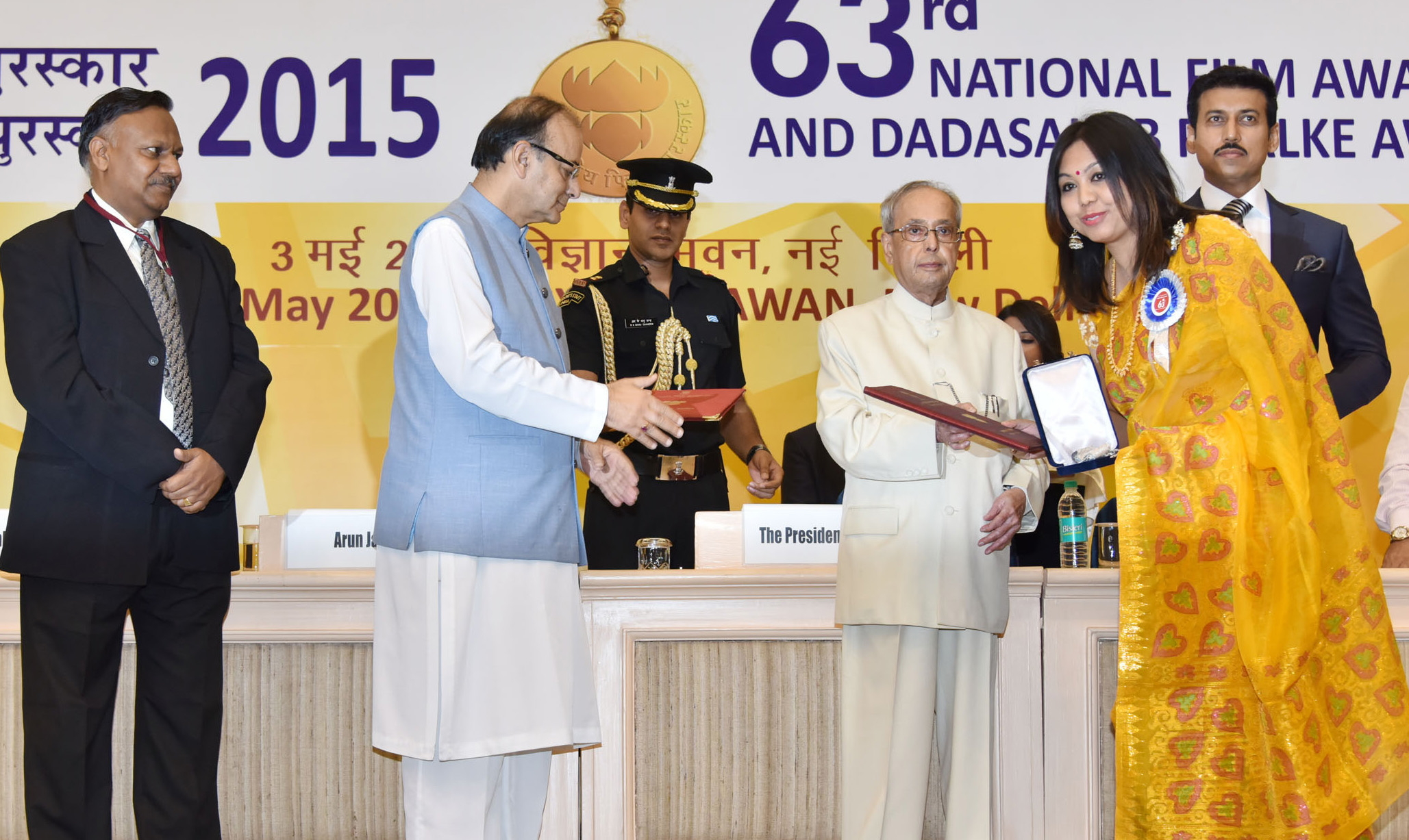
Meena Longjam receiving the National Award from the President of India for the film

== Cast ==
- Laibi Oinam
