= Moilangpok Punshiba =

Moirangpok Punshiba Moilangpok Punshiba
- Khuman Ningthou
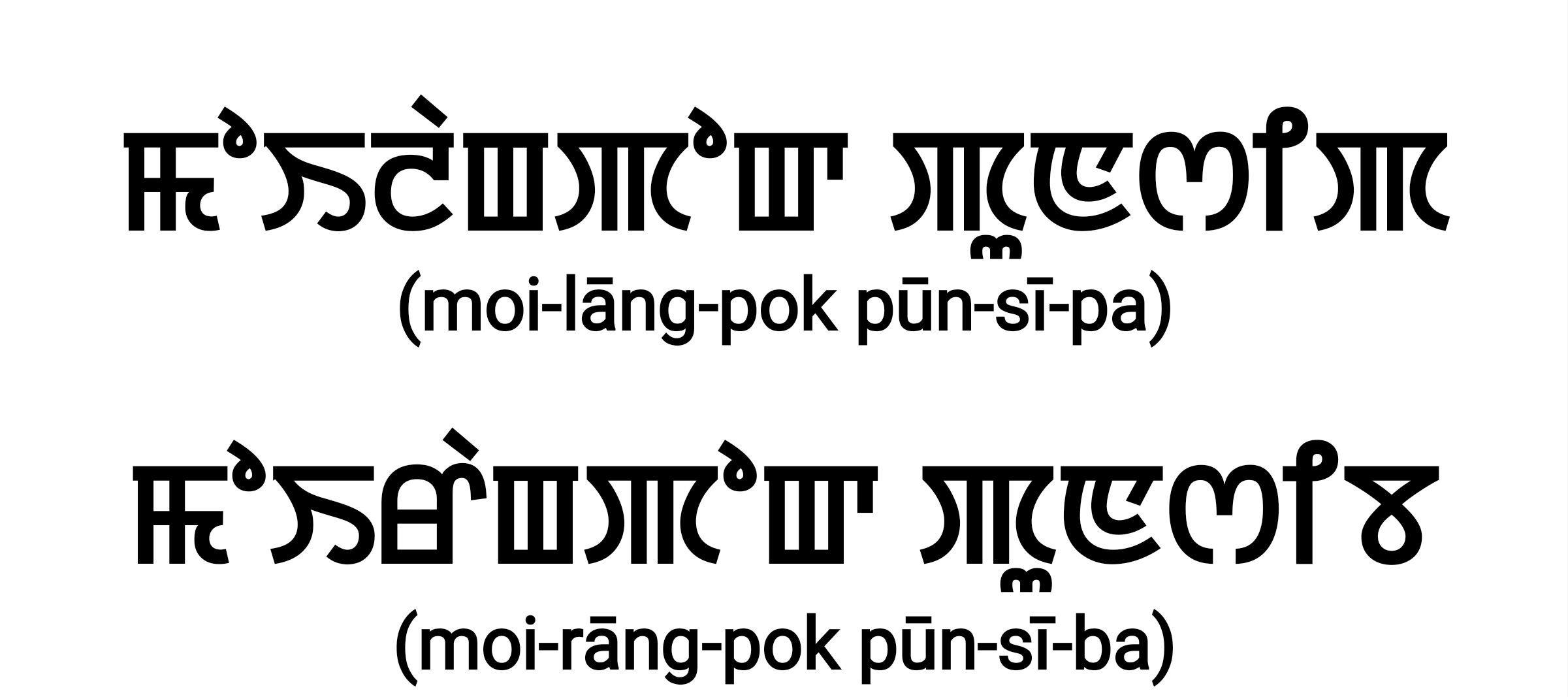
- Monarch: 350 C.E - 400 C.E
- Predecessor: Lungba Ahanba
- Successor: Adon Kajeng Wayenba
- Spouse: Nganurol Yaibi Leima
- Issue: Adon Kajeng Wayenba
- House: Khuman dynasty
- Father: Lungba Ahanba
- Religion: Sanamahism
- Occupation: Monarch

Moirangpok Punshiba (Old Manipuri: Moilangpok Punshipa) or Yoirangpok Punshiba (Old Manipuri: Yoilangpok Punshipa) was a king of the Khuman dynasty who ruled from 350 CE to 400 CE.

He was a contemporary of the Meitei king Pengshiba, who ruled the Ningthouja dynasty from 378 CE to 393 CE.
