= Festival of Moirang Shai =

Meitei festival of preserving and promoting Moirang Shai

Festival of Moirang Shai (Meitei: Moirang Shai Kumhei)
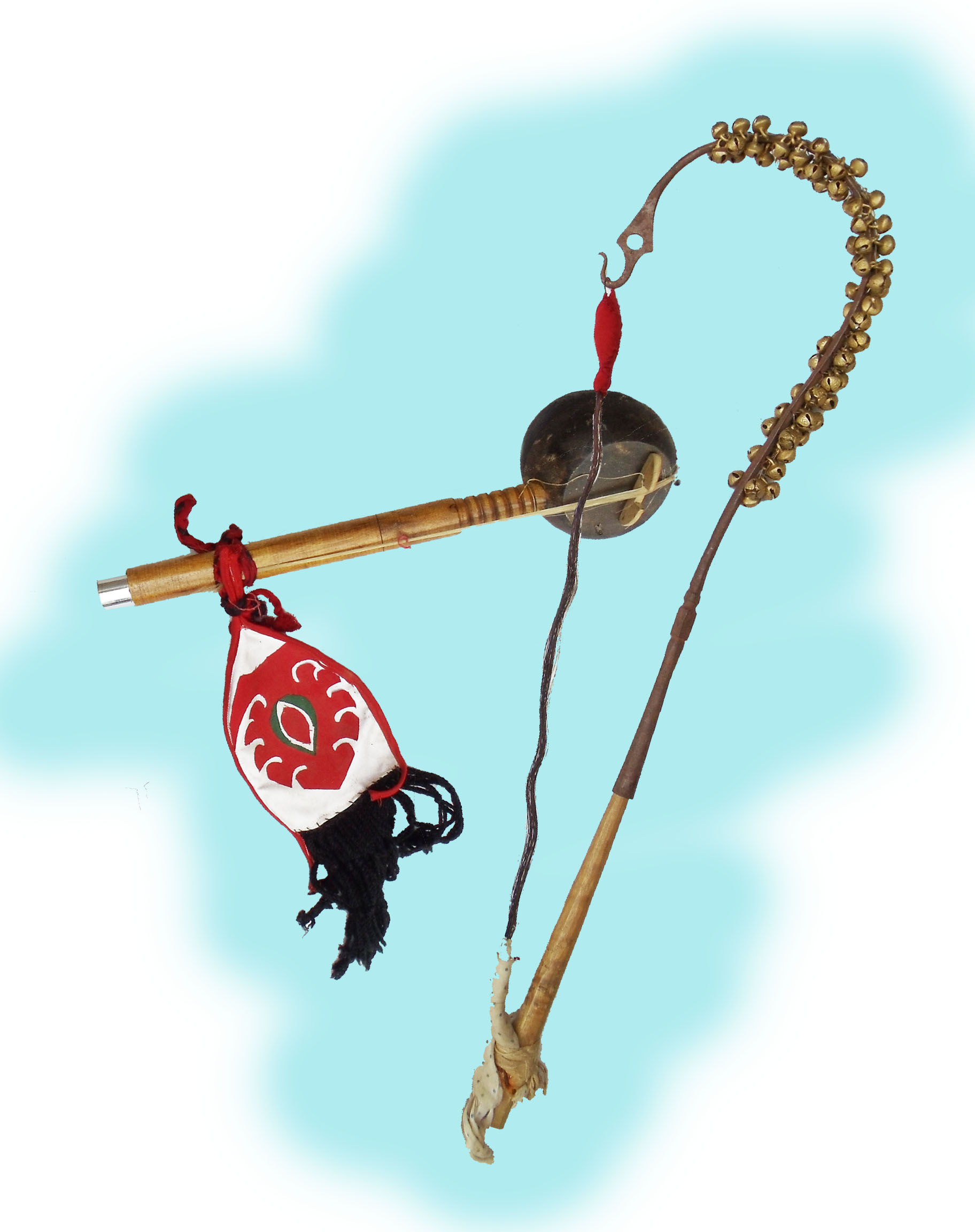
- Status: active
- Genre: festival, conferences, exhibitions
- Frequency: Annually (Note: But sometimes, there were gaps between some years in organising the festival.)
- Location: Manipur
- Country: India
- People: Meitei people

The Festival of Moirang Shai (Meitei: Moirang Shai Kumhei), also known as the Seminar on Moirang Shai, is an academic and cultural annual event. The event aims to impart knowledge of the unique culture of the Meitei people at grassroots level, particularly in preserving and promoting "Moirang Shai", due to the fact that Moirang is often regarded as the origin of Meitei culture and the Khamba Thoibi Dance. It emphasizes that especially younger generation should get aware of their own culture.

During early years of the event, it had been organised as a part of the cultural policy of the Government of India according to which cultural organisations are recommended for interaction with students and kids at different schools around the country at least once a year. The policy aimed to make the students understand their culture and tradition.

== Annual events ==
The organising associations as well as the venues change every year, though not necessary, but regularly.

=== 2017 ===
On 1 April 2017, the festival was organised at the Model High School, Keishamthong, by "Repertory for Performing Arts of Manipur" under the aegis of Sangeet Natak Akademi, New Delhi.

=== 2018 ===
On 21 April 2018, the festival was organised at Oxfort English School, Takyel, Imphal West, by Forward Artistes Centre En-camped (FACE), under the aegis of Sangeet Natak Akademi, Ministry of Culture and Directorate of Art & Culture.

=== 2022 ===
On 23 and 24 December 2022, the festival was jointly organised by the "Moirang Thangjing Yageirel Marup", "Moirang College', "Kumbi College" and "Khamba Thoibi Dance Academy, Moirang", at INA Martyr's Memorial Hall in Moirang. During the festival, a painting competition, on the theme, "Loika Loikum", was organised for students from Class III-VII, besides other events including dance and musical performances.

During the festival, various research scholars, from different academic institutions, presented several research papers, about Meitei culture.

Researchers	Profession(s)	Research papers presented
Chana Lukhoi		'Chingbung Sahitya Amashung Moirang Shai' (Meitei: ꯆꯤꯟꯕꯨꯡ ꯁꯥꯍꯤꯇ꯭ꯌ ꯑꯃꯁꯨꯡ ꯃꯣꯏꯔꯥꯡ ꯁꯥꯏ)
M Jugindro	Professor of Department of History, Moirang College	'Manipur gi Puwarida Moirang Shai' (Meitei: ꯃꯅꯤꯄꯨꯔ ꯒꯤ ꯄꯨꯋꯥꯔꯤꯗ ꯃꯣꯏꯔꯥꯡ ꯁꯥꯏ)
Makhonmani Mongsaba	Professor, Manipur University of Culture	'Performing Folk Art Ama Oina Moirang Shai' (Meitei: ꯄꯔꯐꯣꯔꯃꯤꯡ ꯐꯣꯜ꯭ꯛ ꯑꯥꯔ꯭ꯠ ꯑꯃ ꯑꯣꯏꯅ ꯃꯣꯏꯔꯥꯡ ꯁꯥꯏ)
Thoudam Tejpati Devi		'Pena Shei Shakka Moirang Shaiga Leinaba Mari' (Meitei: ꯄꯦꯅꯥ ꯁꯩ ꯁꯛꯀ ꯃꯣꯏꯔꯥꯡ ꯁꯥꯏꯒ ꯂꯩꯅꯕ ꯃꯔꯤ)
Dr K Bidyarani Devi	Professor, Department of History, Kumbi College	'Anganba Matamgi Moirang Shai Sheishakpashing' (Meitei: ꯑꯉꯟꯕ ꯃꯇꯝꯒꯤ ꯃꯣꯏꯔꯥꯡ ꯁꯥꯏ ꯁꯩꯁꯛꯄꯁꯤꯡ)
K Jugeshwor Singh	Retired Principal, Kumbi College	'Moirang Jati na Moirang Shaigi Lengdraba Yumpham Thollambi' (Meitei: ꯃꯣꯏꯔꯥꯡ ꯖꯥꯇꯤ ꯅ ꯃꯣꯏꯔꯥꯡ ꯁꯥꯏꯒꯤ ꯂꯦꯡꯗ꯭ꯔꯕ ꯌꯨꯝꯐꯝ ꯊꯣꯜꯂꯝꯕꯤ)
Ph Tampakleima Devi	Lecturer, Department of History, Moirang Multipurpose Higher Secondary School	'Moirang Shai Sheishaklonda Ngasi Amadi Hayeng' (Meitei: ꯃꯣꯏꯔꯥꯡ ꯁꯥꯏ ꯁꯩꯁꯛꯂꯣꯟꯗ ꯉꯁꯤ ꯑꯃꯗꯤ ꯍꯌꯦꯡ)

== See also ==
- Epic cycles of incarnations in Moirang
- Khamba Thoibi
- Pena (musical instrument)
- Emoinu Fish Fest
