= Oinam Shilla Chanu =

Oinam Shilla Chanu (ꯑꯣꯏꯅꯥꯝ ꯁꯤꯜꯂꯥ ꯆꯅꯨ) is an Indian police officer and beauty pageant participant from Manipur. She is known for her participation in Mrs India Earth 2018 and her social welfare work in New Delhi.

== Early life and career ==
Oinam Shilla Chanu serves as a police officer with the Delhi Police. She has also been involved in the National Cadet Corps (NCC). She was the parade commander of the North Eastern Region (NER) contingent during the Republic Day Parade in 2003 and is a holder of the NCC "C" Certificate.

== Mrs India Earth 2018 ==
Oinam Shilla Chanu represented Manipur in Mrs India Earth 2018, which was held on 7 September 2018 at the ITC Welcom Hotel, Dwarka, New Delhi. Out of 47 contestants, she was selected among the Top 25 finalists for the Question and Answer Round.

She received two special titles at the event:

- Mrs Most Creative 2018
- Mrs Best Traditional Costume 2018

Her department announced a cash prize in recognition of her social welfare activities.

== Social work and recognition ==
Oinam Shilla Chanu has carried out several community welfare activities. She initiated a Tree Plantation Programme in New Delhi with the help of Delhi Police and local community members. She also provided free education to underprivileged children by giving them books and pens.

In addition, she has supported widows, divorcees, and women affected by domestic violence through assistance from the Women Help Desk.

== Awards and honours ==
In January 2019, Oinam Shilla Chanu received the Social Development Award 2019 from Chief Guest Dr. Janica Darbari, the Honorary Consul General of Montenegro in India. The award was presented during The Society Development Award 2019 ceremony organized by Anand Organisation for Social Development at Muktadhara Auditorium, Banga Sanskriti Bhavan, New Delhi, on 28 January 2019.

She was also honoured with the Ningol Achievers Award 2018 by the 4th Ningol Chakouba Delhi 2018 Organizing Committee at Major Dhyanchand National Stadium, India Gate, New Delhi, in December 2018.

She was rewarded by her department as Joint Commissioner of Police (Southern Range).

== See also ==
- Oinam family
