= Khangembam Mangi Singh =

Indian musician (1927–2022)

- Born: 8 November 1927; Lambal, Imphal, Manipur, India
- Died: 15 June 2022 (aged 94)
- Occupation: Pena musician
- Years active: 1938–2022
- Spouse: Yengkhom Mema
- Children: Two children
- Parent: Khangembam Tomei
- Awards: Padma Shri; Sangeet Natak Akademi Award; Manipuri Sahitya Parishad Shanman; LEIKOL Basanta Bimala Award; Manipur State Kala Akademy Award; Manipuri Sahitya Parishad Sangeet Bhushan; Sana Leikham Pena Shanglakpa
- Website: Official web site

The Pena or Tingteila is a bowed lute. It is the oldest instrument known to the Meiteis. It is used in folk music as well as an accompaniment to Manipuri dances.

Khangembam Mangi Singh (8 November 1927 – 15 June 2022), popularly known as Guru Pena Mangi, was an Indian musician, known for his expertise on the Manipuri traditional musical instrument Pena. The Government of India honored him in 2011, with the fourth highest civilian award of Padma Shri.

== Biography ==
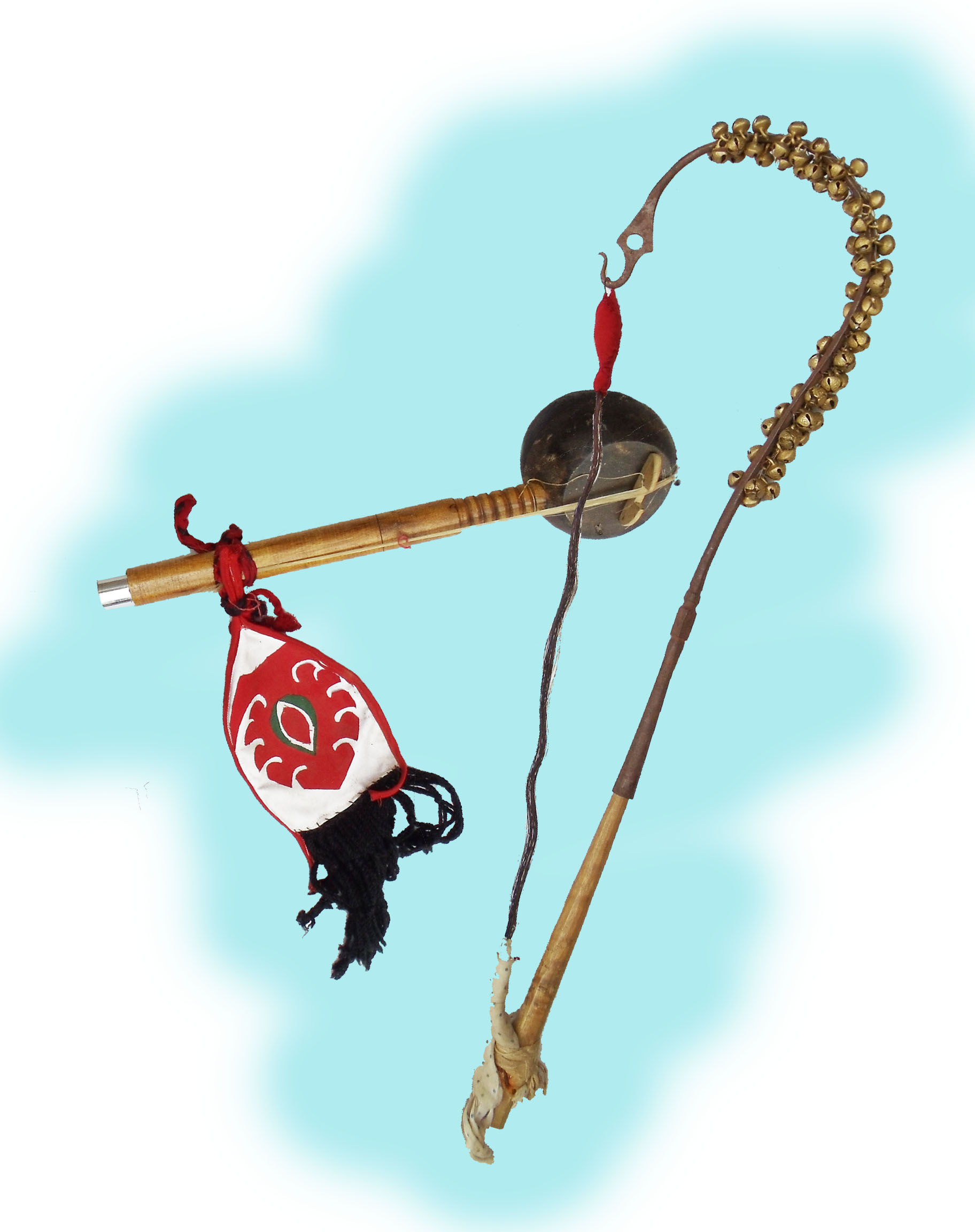
"PENA" a musical instrument

Khangembam Mangi Singh was born on 8 November 1927 in a family with meagre financial resources in a small hamlet in the Manipuri capital Imphal west known as Lambal, in India to locally know Pena musician, Khangembam Tomei, as one of his eight children. He started learning Pena at a young age from his father as well as musicians such as Moirangthem Modu of Lairenkabi, Phamdom Sanajao of Tera Urak, Thangjam Toyai, Tokpam Papu, Khumukcham Kanhai, Yumnam Kanhai and Thokchom Tolomu. His father left the family when the young Khangembam was only eleven and he had no resources to pursue formal education. Instead Khangembam utilised his skills in Pena music for eking out a living for his family, and had an opportunity to perform in front of King Budhachandra, the King of Manipur. He also worked as a bullock cart transporter apart from performing the Pena recitations.

In 1975, Mangi Singh joined Jawaharlal Nehru Manipur Dance Academy, then known as Dance College, as a Pena performer and worked there till his retirement in 1996 as the Guru of Lai Haraoba. He hold the positions of Sana Leikham Pena Shanglakpa at the Manipur Pandit Loishang and Guru of Laihui where he taught Pena.

Khangembam Mangi Singh was married to Yengkhom Mema and the couple has two children. The family lived at Lourung Purel Leikai in West Imphal. He died on 15 June 2022, at the age of 94.

== Legacy and recognitions ==
Mangi Singh was the founder member of Laihui, a centre for research on traditional and indigenous performing arts started in 1985. He has performed in many places across the world such as Mexico, Washington, London, Berlin, France and Asian countries and has participated in traditional manipuri plays and festivals. He has also presented papers and has held demonstrations on Lai haraoba and Pena at various seminars and workshops.

Mangi Singh, the first Pena player to be honoured with the Padma Shri which he received in 2011, has won many awards such as the Sangeet Natak Akademi Award (2006), Manipuri Sahitya Parishad Shanman (2010), LEIKOL Basanta Bimala Award (2008), Manipur State Kala Akademy Award (2005), Manipuri Sahitya Parishad Sangeet Bhushan (2004) and Sana Leikham Pena Shanglakpa (2002) from the Manipur Pandit Loishang.

== See also ==
- Music of Manipur
