= Senba Mimaba =

Monarch of historic Manipur, India

- King of Khuman dynasty and Prince of Luwang dynasty
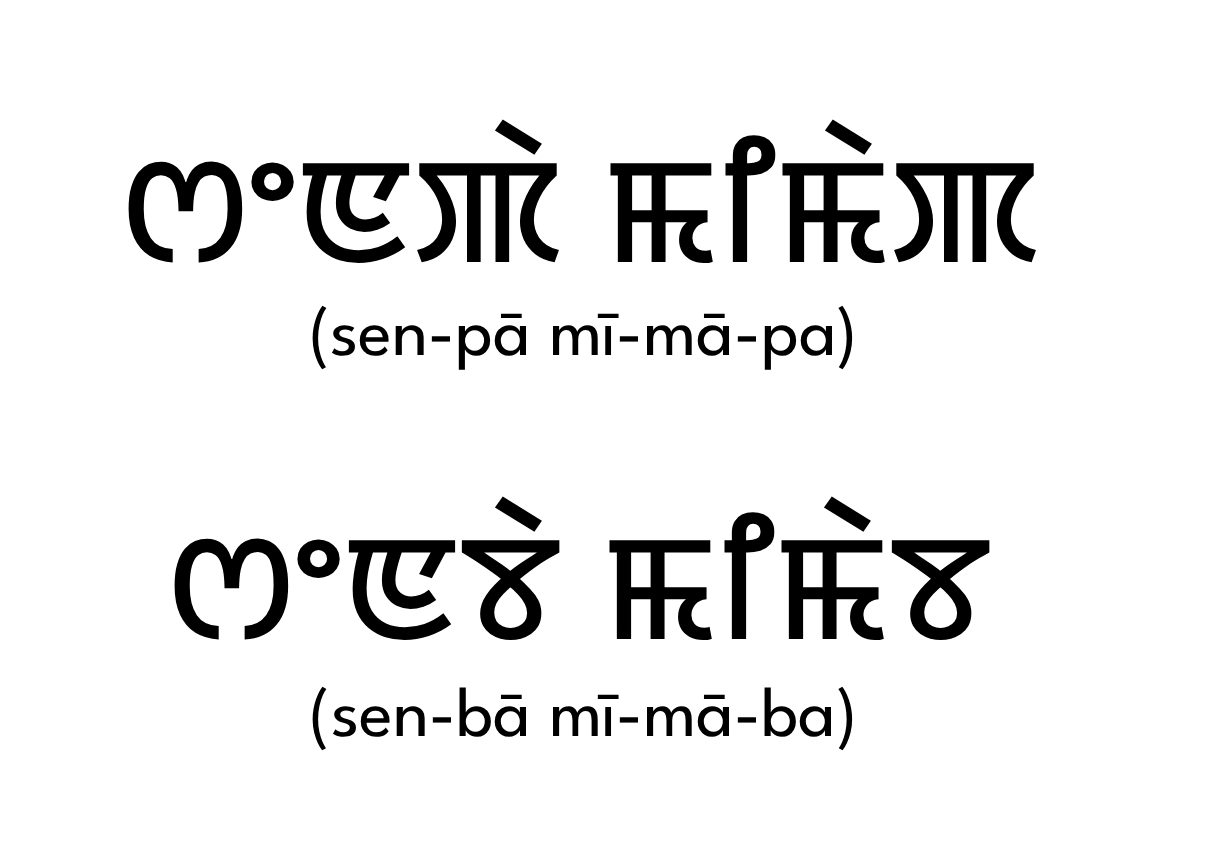
- Monarch: 700 C.E – 760 C.E
- Predecessor: Punshi Yumoiba
- Successor: Yoithongai
- Issue: Laiku, Laikha, Laipha
- Father: Luwang Ningthou Punshiba
- Mother: Khayoiron Nganbi
- Religion: Sanamahism

Senba Mimaba (ꯁꯦꯟꯕꯥ ꯃꯤꯃꯥꯕ) was a monarch of the Khuman dynasty of Ancient Kangleipak (early Manipur) who reigned from 700 CE to 760 CE. He was also inherently a Luwang prince.

He was a contemporary of Meitei king Naothingkhong of the Ningthouja dynasty. He succeeded his maternal grandfather, Punshi Yumoiba.

== Early life ==
Senba Mimaba was born to Luwang Ningthou Punshiba and Khayoiron Nganbi (Nganu Thumbi) from the Khuman dynasty, even though both clans share a common ancestry. Eventually, his mother separated from his father and returned with Senba Mimaba to the Khuman region. He transported the figure of Imoinu from the Luwang territory to the Khuman territory.

Senba Mimaba was reunited with his father during a hunting incident.

== Reign and integration into hill tribes ==
After the death of his maternal grandfather Punshi Yumoiba, Senba Mimaba took the throne of the Khuman kingdom in 700 CE. He reigned until 760 CE, when he was succeeded by Yoithongai.

During his reign, Senba Mimaba initiated an expedition to the southeastern hills of Manipur. He ultimately integrated with local hill communities and is recognized as one of the principal ancestral figures of the Maring tribe.

== Descendants ==
Senba Mimaba had three children: Laiku, Laikha, and Laipha. Following the conclusion of his reign and with Yoithongai taking over the Khuman throne, all three sons escaped the kingdom. Laiku made his home in Leitang, Laikha established himself in Uchiwa, and Laipha moved to the Maring region, where he assimilated into the Maring community.
