= Lungba =

- Khuman Ningthou
- Monarch: 260 – 300 CE
- Predecessor: Tumaba
- Successor: Nongdamlen Ahanba
- Born: Lungpa
- Spouse: Leithamlen Chanu
- Issue: Nongdamlen Ahanba (Lungba Ahanba)
- House: Khuman dynasty
- Father: Tumaba
- Religion: Sanamahism

Lungba (Old Manipuri:ꯂꯨꯡꯄ), romanized: Lungpa), also known as Nongdamlen Akhuba II, was a monarch of the Khuman dynasty in ancient Manipur. He ruled from approximately 260 CE to 300 CE.

He was a contemporary of Taothingmang, the ruler of the Ningthouja dynasty, who reigned from 264 CE to 364 CE.
