= Lungba Ahanba =

Fourth ruler of the Khuman dynasty

Lungba Ahanba Nongdamlen Ahanba
- Khuman Ningthou
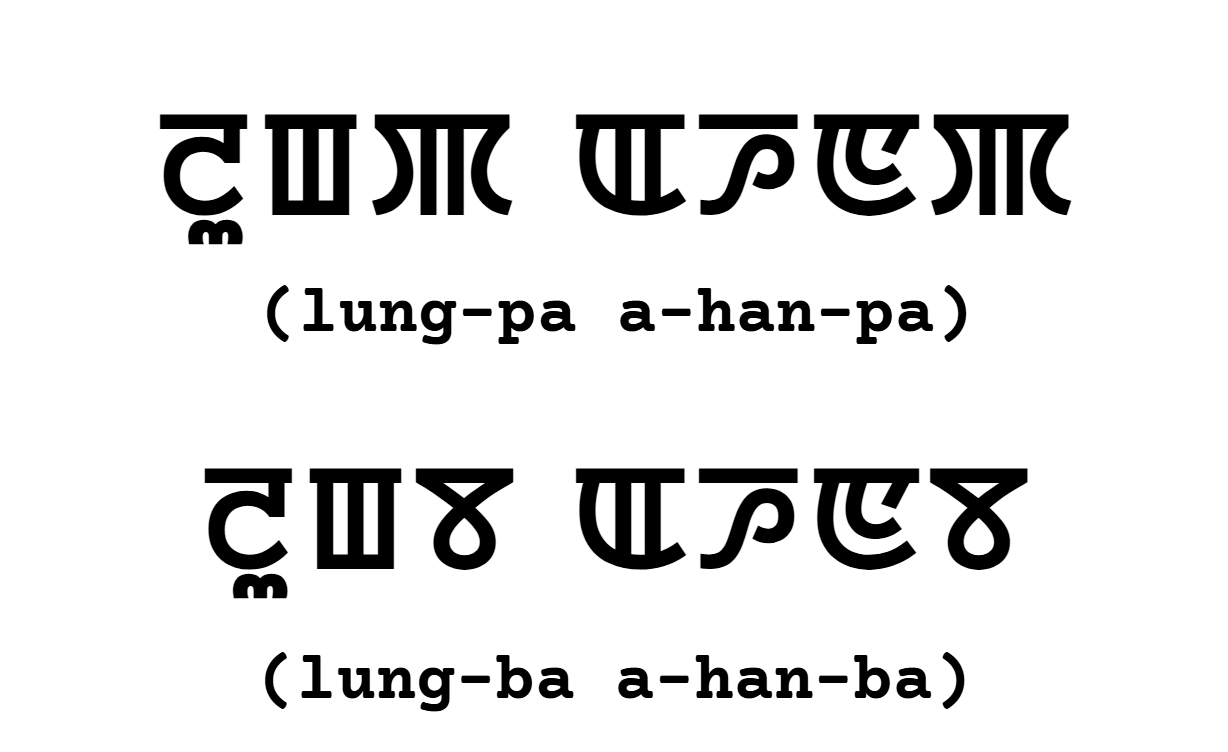
- Monarch: 300 CE – 350 CE
- Predecessor: Lungba
- Successor: Moilangpok Punshiba
- Spouse: Leirum Langbi
- Issue: Moilangpok Punshiba
- House: Khuman dynasty
- Father: Lungba
- Religion: Sanamahism
- Occupation: Monarch

Lungba Ahanba (Old Manipuri: ꯂꯨꯡꯕ ꯑꯍꯟꯄ, romanised: Lungpa Ahanpa), also known as Nongdamlen Ahanba, was a king of the Khuman dynasty who ruled from approximately 300 CE to 350 CE.

He was a contemporary of Taothingmang, a king of the Ningthouja dynasty, who ruled from 264 CE to 364 CE.
