= Adon Nongba Khomba =

King of the Khuman dynasty of Manipur (450–520 CE)

- Khuman Ningthou

King of the Khuman kingdom
- Monarch: 450 CE – 520 CE
- Predecessor: Kachengwa Yengmaba
- Successor: Khomba Ningthouba
- Spouse: Wangamlon Naokhamba Chanu Leirum Lembi
- Issue: Khomba Ningthouba
Names
- Adon Mongba Khomba
- House: Khuman dynasty
- Father: Kachengwa Yengmaba
- Religion: Sanamahism
- Occupation: Monarch

Adon Nongba Khomba (Old Manipuri: ꯑꯇꯣꯟ ꯅꯣꯡꯄ ꯈꯣꯝꯄ, romanised: Aton Nongpa Khompa) (Note: Also spelled as Adon Mongba Khomba (ꯑꯗꯣꯟ ꯃꯣꯡꯕ ꯈꯣꯝꯕ) or Aton Mongpa Khompa (ꯑꯇꯣꯟ ꯃꯣꯡꯄ ꯈꯣꯝꯄ).) was a ruler of the Khuman dynasty who reigned from 450 CE to 520 CE.

He was a contemporary of King Naophangba of the Ningthouja dynasty, who ruled from 427 CE to 517 CE.

== Family ==
=== Parents ===
His father and predecessor was Adon Kajeng Wayenba (also known as Kachengwa Yengmaba), and his mother was Wangamlon Pengsiba Chanu Leirum Chengbi of the Ningthouja dynasty.

=== Son and successor ===
He was succeeded by his son, Khomba Ningthouba, who was mothered by his Queen Wangamlon Naokhamba Chanu Leirum Lembi of the Ningthouja dynasty.
