= Chingkhong Thonggraiba =

- Khuman Ningthou
- Monarch: 900 CE – 930 CE
- Predecessor: Thongleirom
- Successor: Siyarong
- Spouse: Nganurol Chanu Chingsombi
- Issue: Siyarong, Purankhnoushiba, Thonghan, Thanongyai, Laipa
- House: Khuman dynasty
- Father: Thongleirom
- Mother: Nganurol Khaithiba Chanu
- Religion: Sanamahism
- Occupation: Monarch

Adon Chingkhong Thonggraiba (Old Manipuri: Aton Chingkhong Thongkalaipa) was a ruler of the Khuman dynasty who reigned from 900 CE to 930 CE.

He was the contemporary of King Ayangba of the Ningthouja dynasty, who ruled from 821 CE to 910 CE.

== Alliance with Moirang and the Founding of Khuman Lineages ==
During his reign, Chingkhong Thonggraiba formed an alliance with the people of Moirang and led a military campaign against Luwang Phantek, a settlement located in Lamangdong (present-day Bishnupur). The combined forces successfully destroyed the area.

Following the campaign, Thonggraiba married Chingyai Nganu Chanu. They had five sons: Siyarong, Purankhnoushiba, Thonghan, Thanongyai, and Laipa.

These sons later became the ancestral figures of various branches within the Khuman dynasty.
