= Oinam Dilip =

Oinam Dilip (ꯑꯣꯏꯅꯥꯝ ꯗꯤꯂꯤꯞ), also known as Dilip Oinam (ꯗꯤꯂꯤꯞ ꯑꯣꯏꯅꯥꯝ), is an Indian Manipuri artist known for his paintings and solo exhibitions. He is based in New Delhi, India. He participates in various group shows and has received recognition for his work both in India and abroad.

== Early life and education ==
Oinam Dilip was born and raised in Manipur. He began painting at a young age and won several art competitions at both the state and national levels. He later moved to New Delhi to pursue higher studies and graduated with a degree in Fine arts (B.F.A) from the College of Art, New Delhi.

== Career ==
Dilip Oinam is a freelance artist whose works have been collected in Korea, the United Kingdom, the United States, and Egypt. He has worked with Art Alive, one of India's prominent art galleries in New Delhi.

== Style and themes ==
Dilip's paintings often feature larger-than-life figures, including children, women, and couples. His works are influenced by his personal experiences and the culture of Northeast India. Early in his career, his work was influenced by Bengal artists and the contemporary South Asian art scene, with themes of solitude, darkness, and sentimentalism.

In his recent works, he focuses on the cultural and anthropological vibrancy of North East India. His paintings use multi-layered, vibrant acrylic strokes to depict flora, fauna, identity-based images, and cultural objects. Most of his paintings are figurative, allowing viewers to connect with representational art.

Dilip aims to document lost and forgotten traditions of his culture. He combines realism and abstraction to create visual tension and highlight the diversity of North East Indian culture.

== Awards ==
In 2018, Oinam Dilip received the ART INC “Rising Star” award. The award included a trophy, certificate, and cash prize. It was presented by Renu Rana of ART INC at a ceremony on December 24 at the India International Centre in New Delhi. The jury included prominent artists such as Arpana Caur, Niren Sengupta, Hemant Khandelwal, and Biman Das.

== Exhibitions ==
=== Art Meets Fashion (2019) ===
Dilip's first exhibition, Art Meets Fashion, was held from November 24 to December 4, 2019, at Ningthibee Collection in Imphal, Manipur. The event combined Dilip's paintings, a neo art installation by Kenny Ngairangbam, and a fashion showcase by Sailex Ngairangbam.

=== Homecoming (2018) ===
The solo exhibition Homecoming was held at the India International Centre, New Delhi, from July 4 to 10, 2018. The exhibition featured 15 to 17 works inspired by North East Indian culture and identity. The paintings explored themes of home, folklore, tribals, and traditional practices, showing both real and abstract elements.

Dilip explained that the exhibition was a way to reconnect with his native culture and to present the vibrancy of North East India to a wider audience. He aimed to counter misconceptions and increase awareness of the region's culture.

=== Pa & Pi ===
Dilip also held a solo exhibition titled Pa & Pi, which showcased a collection of his works reflecting his artistic transitions and explorations of life's complexities. The exhibition highlighted themes of innocence, human relationships, and cultural expression.

== See also ==
- Oinam family
