= Oinam Ibeyaima =

Oinam Ibeyaima (ꯑꯣꯏꯅꯥꯝ ꯏꯕꯦꯌꯥꯏꯃꯥ) is a Meitei Christian from Manipur, India, who has been recognized as the tallest woman in the state. She stands 6.3 feet (191 cm) tall. She is also known for her work in Christian missionary activities in the valley districts of Manipur, which are mainly Vaishnavite.

== Early life and height recognition ==
Ibeyaima was born in Wangoo Sandangkhong village. In 2004, during an official function at Gandhi Memorial Hall in Imphal, she was declared the tallest woman in Manipur at the age of 39.

== Religious work ==
Ibeyaima is a Christian convert and completed her Christian missionary training in 1996. She married Maibam Tiken, a Pastor from Phouden Keirenphabi village in Thoubal district, in 2004. Since their marriage, the couple has conducted regular ministerial campaigns almost every week under Believers' Church in Thoubal and Bishnupur districts.

Their missionary work has resulted in the establishment of a local church in Salungpham, Thoubal district, and plans for additional churches in the area are ongoing.

Ibeyaima and her husband continue to work together in missionary campaigns, aiming to expand Christian communities and establish churches in Thoubal and Bishnupur districts.

== See also ==
- Oinam family
