= Haoramton =

- Khuman Ningthou
- Monarch: 800 C.E – 830 C.E
- Predecessor: Yoithongai
- Successor: Menshomba
- Born: Haoramton Louthiba
- Spouse: Nganurol Khongaiba Chanu
- Issue: Menshomba, Athing Mongbisu, Thongbu Sanamba, Liklai Thawaa
- House: Khuman dynasty
- Father: Yoithongai
- Mother: Nganurol Kaireima
- Religion: Sanamahism
- Occupation: Monarch

Haoramton was a monarch of the Khuman dynasty in ancient Kangleipak (present-day Manipur, India). He reigned from approximately 800 to 830 CE. He was a contemporary of King Yaraba of the Ningthouja dynasty, who ruled from 799 to 821 CE.

== Early life ==
Haoramton was the youngest son of King Yoithongai and Queen Nganurol Kaireima. He had two elder brothers, Haoramhal and Haoramyai.

According to legend, a royal priest named Thoiba and his wife Chaobi Nongnangma-chak once discovered a beaded necklace beneath a large Heibung tree while fishing near a hill. The necklace was presented to King Yoithongai, who later passed it to his second son and eventually to Haoramton.

== Fratricide and succession ==
During this period, King Punshiba of the Luwang dynasty constructed a grand palace and invited all noble families of Kangleipak to its inauguration. Haoramhal and Haoramyai attended the feast, and Haoramhal wore the royal necklace with permission from his mother.

Upon discovering the necklace was missing, Haoramton became enraged. Failing to locate it, he took his father's sword and confronted his brothers. In the ensuing conflict, he killed Haoramhal.

Following the incident, Haoramyai fled to the Moirang kingdom, where he had two sons: Parenkoiba and Thangloihaiba. Parenkoiba's son, Puremba, became a renowned warrior.

== Reign and descendants ==
Haoramton ascended the throne of the Khuman kingdom after these events. He married Queen Nganuron Khongaiba Chanu. The couple had four sons:

- Menshomba – succeeded Haoramton as king
- Athing Mongbisu – progenitor of the Mongbijam family
- Thongbu Sanamba – founder of the Langdam and Ngangbam families
- Liklai Thawaa – ancestor of the Hawaijam, Akangjam, and Pallubam families

== Collateral branches ==
Descendants of Haoramton's brothers also founded several prominent families:

- From Haoramhal:
  - Thoidingjam
  - Yanglem
- From Haoramyai:
  - Thengujam
  - Pukhrem
  - Phairenbam
  - Langlenhanbam
  - Chandam
  - Tourem
  - Pangeijam
