= Punshi Yumoiba =

King of the Khuman dynasty (620–700 CE)

Adon Punshi Yumoiba
- Khuman Ningthou

King of the Khuman dynasty
- Monarch: 620 C.E – 700 C.E
- Predecessor: Laiphangba
- Successor: Senba Mimaba
- Spouse: Nganurol Chanu Khambi
- Issue: Yoithongai, Keirunghangbi, Khayoilon Nganbi
Regnal name
- Adon Punshi Yumoiba
- House: Khuman dynasty
- Father: Laiphangba
- Mother: Nganurol Kaireima
- Religion: Sanamahism
- Occupation: Monarch

Adon Punshi Yumoiba (Old Manipuri: Aton Punshi Yumoipa) was a ruler of the Khuman dynasty of ancient Kangleipak (present-day Manipur). He reigned from 620 CE to 700 CE.

He was a contemporary of King Naothingkhong of the Ningthouja dynasty.

== Reign and alliances ==
During his reign, Punshi Yumoiba built up the political and cultural significance of Nongyai Leikoipung (Mayang Imphal), the second capital city founded by his father Laiphangba. He built a powerful alliance with King Naothingkhong of the Ningthouja dynasty. Punshi Yoimoiba gave shelter to him and later gave him his daughter, Keirunghangbi to marriage.

With this alliance, Punshi Yumoiba also gave a part of the Khuman kingdom to the Meitei kingdom. However, this political act triggered a dispute among the Khuman people and led to the rebellion by Senba Mimaba.

== Religion and cultural legacy ==
Punshi Yumoiba also started the worship of the goddess Imoinu. He built her shrine at the royal palace at Mayang Imphal. This was a significant role in starting the worship if Imoinu into the cultural and spiritual practices of the Khuman dynasty.
