= Oinam Thoiba =

Indian actor and director (1954–2025)

Oinam Thoiba (15 September 1954 – 4 November 2025) was an Indian Shumang Leela (courtyard play) actor and director from Manipur. He was best known for his roles in Khamnu 82 and Enamma. He was also nicknamed as "Ibai Thoiba" and "Point Kouta".

== Early life ==
Oinam Thoiba was born on 15 September 1954 in Naharup Awang Leikai, Imphal East, Manipur. He was married and had three daughters and three sons.

== Career in Shumang Leela plays ==
Thoiba began performing Shumang Leela in 1976. He was introduced to the art form by Oja Bidhu, who was popularly known as Soibon Saba. His first play was Puya Meithaba, under the guidance of Ningombam Angouton.

He became popularly known as Ebai Thoiba after acting in the play Khamnu 82. Thoiba learned Shumang Leela from several mentors, including Ningombam Angouton, Oja Mayurdhaja, and Birjit Ngangomba.

== Retirement and death ==
Thoiba retired from Shumang Leela in 2017, after receiving the Best Director Award at the Shumang Leela Festival 2016–2017, organized by Manipur State Kala Akademi.

Thoiba died on 4 November 2025, at the age of 71.

== Notable works ==
Thoiba acted in more than 100 Shumang Leela plays and directed many others in different groups. Some of his popular plays include:

- Puya Meithaba
- Jagoi Sabi
- Laman
- Churanthaba
- Manglangi Manja
- Khamnu 82
- Nungshibagi Mammal
- Chahi Taret Khuntakpa
- Miss Sangbanabi
- Abir Khan
- Nungshi Mapao Tadrabasu
- Mou Apaibi
- Enamma
- Maogi Ebai

== Associations ==
Thoiba was part of several Shumang Leela groups, including:

- Imphal Jatra cum Drama Association
- Time Star Artists Union
- Naharol Khongthang Artist Association (Chakthekpi Party)
- The North Imphal Jatra Mandal
- Peace Maker Artistes’ Association

== Awards and recognition ==
Oinam Thoiba received several awards during his career:

- Best Actor Award for Leikang Thaba Thabaton (Imphal Jatra cum Drama Association) at the 1984 Shumang Leela Festival organized by Manipur State Kala Akademi.
- Best Supporting Actor Award for Manglangi Manja (Imphal Jatra cum Drama Association) at the 1990 Shumang Leela Festival.
- Best Director Award for Arangba Thawanmichak (Peace Maker Artistes’ Association) at the Shumang Leela Festival 2016–2017 of Manipur State Kala Akademi.
- Second Best Director Award for Keidoungei Chatkani (The North Imphal Jatra Mandal) at the Shumang Leela Festival 2006–2007.

== Filmography ==
Thoiba also acted in Manipuri films, including Ema Ei Leihourage, Chekla Paikhrabada, and Loktak Patki Nungshibi.

== See also ==
- Oinam family
