= Oinam Romen =

Oinam Romen Singh (ꯑꯣꯏꯅꯥꯝ ꯔꯣꯃꯦꯟ ꯁꯤꯡꯍ) is an Indian politician and social activist from Manipur. He is a member of the Manipur Pradesh Congress Committee (MPCC) and is involved in youth development, welfare for disabled individuals, and promotion of sports in his constituency, Singjamei, Imphal West District.

== Political and social work ==
=== Youth engagement ===
Singh has emphasized the role of youth in shaping the future of Manipur, describing them as pillars of the nation and advocates of social and economic progress. He has promoted youth participation in democratic processes and leadership development.

He has organized induction programs for young people in his constituency through the Singjamei Youth Congress Committee (SYCC). During these programs, he distributed certificates under the PM Surya Ghar: Muft Bijly Yojana, a scheme providing free household energy.

=== Welfare initiatives ===
Singh has provided monthly pensions to disabled persons and selected elderly individuals in Singjamei. The pension amount is one thousand rupees per month, funded from his personal resources.

He has urged the government to implement sustainable livelihood schemes and provide additional support for disabled individuals. Singh has emphasized that his initiatives are philanthropic in nature, not politically motivated.

== Cultural and social activities ==
Singh has participated in social initiatives including the Indo-Myanmar Friendship Tour 2019, organized to reconnect with Meitei people settled outside Manipur.

== Sports promotion ==
He has supported the development of sports by honoring talented athletes, particularly in basketball. Singh presided over an event organized by the Youth Amateur Welfare Association (YAWA) to recognize outstanding players from the North Eastern Region and provided financial assistance to support their future endeavors.

== See also ==
- Oinam family
