= Oinam Swamikumar =

Manipuri singer

Oinam Swamikumar (ꯑꯣꯏꯅꯥꯝ ꯁ꯭ꯋꯥꯃꯤꯀꯨꯃꯥꯔ) is a Manipuri singer from the Indian state of Manipur. He is known for his work in Manipuri music and as a playback singer.

== Career ==
Swamikumar became known for his song "Eigee Nungsibadi Mamal Naide", which gained popularity in Manipur. He is also one of the young approved artists of All India Radio (AIR).

== Coronavirus awareness song ==
During the coronavirus pandemic, a music video titled "Akiba Laanda Amani" was sung by Oinam Swamikumar, which was released to spread awareness about COVID-19. The video was officially released by Chief Minister N. Biren Singh, along with Deputy Chief Minister Y. Joykumar Singh, ministers, and MLAs at the Chief Minister's bungalow. The song, sung by Oinam Swamikumar, was produced to inform the public about government health advisories, including messages about social distancing, staying at home, and washing hands regularly.

== Philanthropy ==
Oinam Swamikumar donated ₹20,000 towards the construction of a Destitute Children Home at Sagolband Tera Bazar in Imphal.

== See also ==
- Oinam family

== Other websites ==
- Oinam Swamikumar at Gaana.com
- Oinam Swamikumar at Chartmetric
- Oinam Swamikumar at Apple Music
- Oinam Swamikumar at Jiosaavn
- Oinam Swamikumar at Spotify
- Oinam Swamikumar at Soundcloud
