= Yairipok =

- Town
- Location in Manipur, India Yairipok (India)
- Coordinates: 24.67°N 94.07°E
- Country: India
- State: Manipur
- District: Thoubal

Area
  - Land: 8 km^{2} (3.1 sq mi)
- Elevation: 845 m (2,772 ft)

Population (2001)
  - Total: 8,263
  - Density: 1,000/km^{2} (2,700/sq mi)

Languages
  - Official: Meiteilon (Manipuri)
- Time zone: UTC+5:30 (IST)
- Vehicle registration: MN
- Website: manipur.gov.in

Yairipok is a town in Thoubal district in the Indian state of Manipur.

== Geography ==
The Thoubal river passes through the heart of town. Yairipok has about 120 towns and villages. Communities such as Viz-Metei, Metei Pangal, Naga, and Kuki are there. Tulihal is the most educated area in Yairipok.

=== Leirongthel Pitra ===
Leirongthel Pitra is a small village. Cultivation and seasonal jobs are the main occupations. Recent press reports concern sand mining restrictions.

== Economy ==
The most fertile and advanced crop field "Salom Loukon" is located in Yairipok. This agricultural land is known throughout the state for its unique quality. Every year, where most parts of the state face drought or flood, this paddy field stays productive. This is because of the irrigation canal from the Thoubal multipurpose project in the Thoubal river. Fish farms and vegetables are the main outputs. Poirou pat loukon also produces food crops.

== Culture ==
Yairipok has many cultural events, including festivals, rituals, harvest, landscapes, people and special events.

=== Temples ===
Kaina is where Hinduism was introduced in Manipur. The Kaina temple is notable because the idols in the govindaji temple in Imphal are made from jackfruit.

Kwarok Sarang Laisaba/Nongpok Ningthou is a holy place known for its blessings of lord Sarang Laisaba/Nongpok. Ningthou is the Kwarok Sarang Laisaba/Nongpok Ningthou in Kekru. It is set on the top of a hill. Hindu people call it Kwarok Mahadev. They pray on 5th Panchami.

=== Pineapple festival ===
The Andro community celebrates a pineapple festival, one of Manipur's biggest occasions. A hut made of pineapple draws tourists.

=== Andro ===
Andro is known for its ancient museum where tools of human civilization were found.

=== Sports Festival ===
In 2017, the 13th Annual Sports Festival took place.

== Demographics ==
Its population reached around 9,569 people as of 2011 census.

As of 2001 India census, Yairipok had a population of 8263. Males constituted 51% of the population and females 49%. The average literacy rate was 64%, higher than the national average of 59.5%: male literacy was 74%, and female literacy was 54%. 14% of the population was under 6. The population density was 1,196/km² [2011], growing at 1.48%/year [2001 → 2011].

== Notables ==
- Yairipok Thambalnu was a woman who sacrificed her life to save others from a flood. An epic based on her was written about by Mathurabashimayum Nandakishor Sharma in 1966.
