= Laibi Oinam =

Laibi Oinam (ꯂꯥꯏꯕꯤ ꯑꯣꯏꯅꯥꯝ, also known as Eche Laibi Oinam) is an auto-rickshaw driver from Imphal, Manipur, India. She is known as the first woman auto driver in Manipur. She became widely recognized during the COVID-19 pandemic in 2020 for driving a recovered patient from Imphal to Kamjong district when no other driver was willing to do so.

== Early life and family ==
Laibi Oinam lives in Pangei Bazaar, Imphal East, Manipur. She is married to Oinam Rajendro Singh, who suffers from diabetes, and they have two sons. Laibi became the sole breadwinner of her family after her husband's illness. Before driving an auto-rickshaw, she worked as a laborer in a brick kiln and sold vegetables and smoked fish to earn a living.

=== Career as an auto driver ===
Laibi became Manipur's first woman commercial auto driver. Her entry into this male-dominated profession faced ridicule and criticism, but she continued her work to support her family. She drives passengers around Imphal city and nearby areas and is known for her dedication and hard work.

=== COVID-19 incident ===
On the night of May 31, 2020, Laibi volunteered to drive Somichon Chithung, a young nurse who had recovered from COVID-19, from the Jawaharlal Nehru Institute of Medical Sciences (JNIMS) in Imphal to her home in Kamjong district, about 140 km away.

The hospital ambulance service had refused to take the nurse home because it was outside their district. Many taxi drivers were also unwilling to travel because of the fear of infection. Seeing the woman in distress, Laibi offered help and decided to make the journey in her own auto-rickshaw, accompanied by her husband.

The journey lasted for about eight hours, from 6 p.m. to 2:30 a.m., through hilly terrain and cold weather. After reaching Kamjong, the couple were placed in quarantine as a safety measure.

== Recognition and awards ==
Manipur Chief Minister N. Biren Singh awarded Laibi Oinam a cash prize of ₹1,10,000 for her service, along with a traditional Manipuri muffler. The award money was contributed by Manipuri entrepreneurs and expatriates from countries such as the United States, the United Kingdom, Canada, and Singapore.

The Chief Minister praised her for her example of "service above self." The Imphal East Traffic Officer-in-Charge also fulfilled a promise to replace the hood of her auto-rickshaw as a gesture of appreciation.

An NGO, Little Drops of Ukhrul, gave her an additional ₹5,000 as a token of gratitude.

Her act received wide praise from the public, including musicians, filmmakers, and social media users. Many people across Manipur described her as a symbol of compassion, courage, and women's empowerment.

== Documentary film ==
A documentary film titled Auto Driver, directed by Meena Longjam, is based on Laibi Oinam's life. The film won the Best Social Issue Film (non-feature category) at the 63rd National Film Awards in 2015 and the Best Short Documentary (Audience Choice) at the 2017 Women's Voices Now Film Festival.

The film portrays Laibi's struggles and achievements as Manipur's first woman auto driver.

== Legacy ==
Laibi Oinam is regarded as a symbol of resilience and women's empowerment in Manipur. Her courage during the COVID-19 pandemic brought her national attention. Her story continues to inspire others to break social barriers and pursue their dreams despite hardships.

== Related pages ==
- Oinam family
