= Khomba Ningthouba =

- Khuman Ningthou

King of the Khuman kingdom
- Monarch: 520 CE – 570 CE
- Predecessor: Adon Nongba Khomba
- Successor: Laiphangba
- Spouse: Wangamlon Naophangba Chanu Laibi
- Issue: Laiphangba
Regnal name
- Adon Khomba Ningthouba
- House: Khuman dynasty
- Father: Kachengwa Yengmaba
- Religion: Sanamahism
- Occupation: Monarch

Adon Khomba Ningthouba (Old Manipuri: ꯈꯣꯝꯄ ꯅꯤꯡꯊꯧꯄ, romanised: Khompa Ningthoupa) was a ruler of the Khuman dynasty of ancient Kangleipak (present-day Manipur). He reigned from 520 CE to 570 CE.

Khomba Ningthouba was a contemporary of Sameirang, the Meitei ruler of the Ningthouja dynasty, who reigned from 517 CE to 567 CE.

== See also ==
- Khuman dynasty
- Ancient Kangleipak
- Sameirang
- Laiphangba
- Ningthouja dynasty
