= Laihui Ensemble =

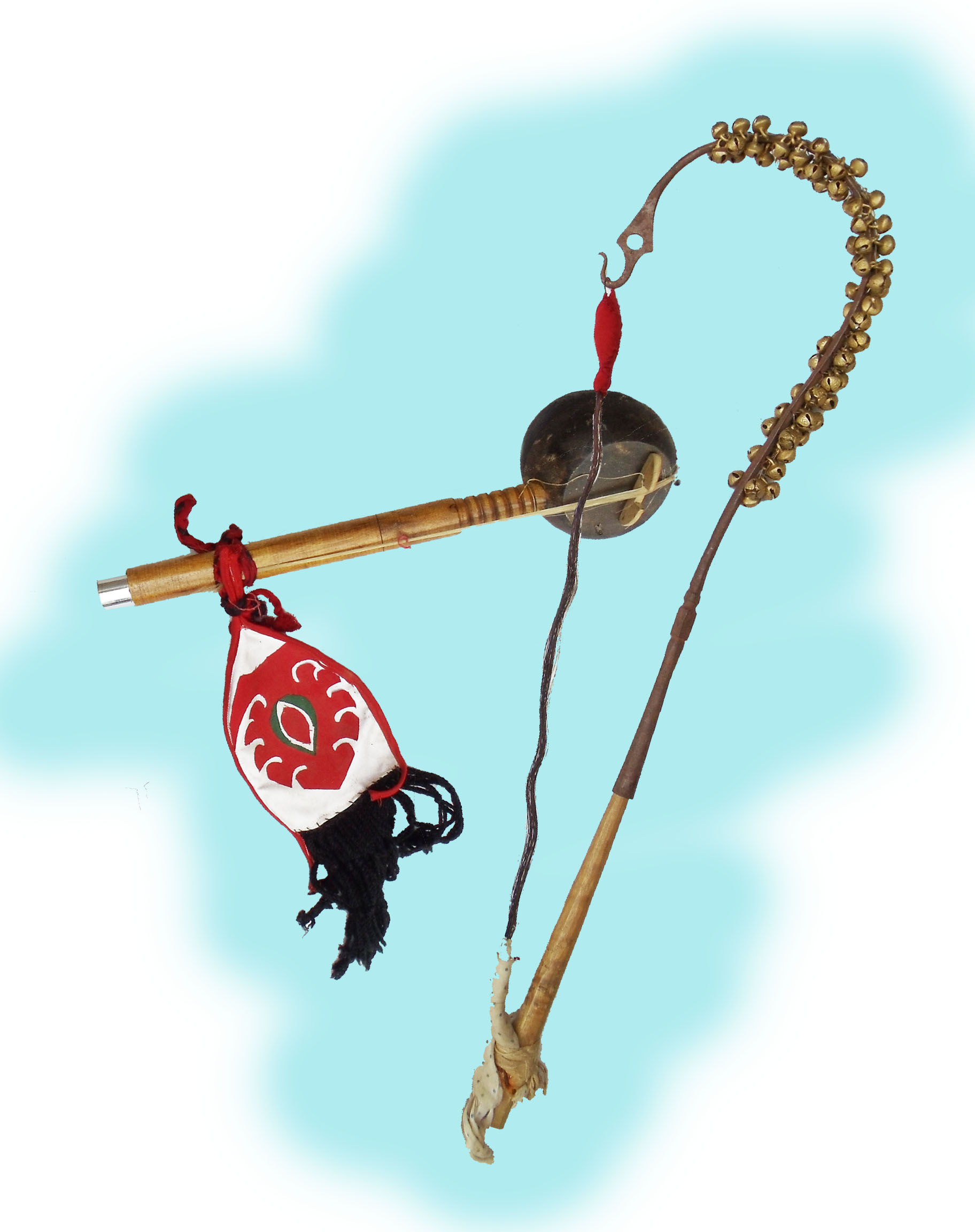

The Laihui Ensemble is a centre for research on traditional and indigenous performing arts, based on Imphal, Manipur. It was established in 1985. The association is performing different art shows at different venues across different nations in the world. Mangka Mayanglambam is one of the most active artists of the ensemble, and is trying her best to revive the dying art forms of Manipur including the Moirang Sai.

== Repertoires ==
=== Selected performances ===
- Uraolol, an ode to the tree - 2005
- Harao Seigonna Jagoi (Divine dances of love from the Lai Haraoba) - 2005-06
- Ode to the Yaiphabi (Mothers' daughter) Manipuri Music Esplanade - 2006
- Lai Haraoba - 2006
- Lei Langba, Moirang Parva, Traditional musical play - 2006-07
- Songs and Shaman dances of Manipur - 2007
- Ithanglen O! Athouba, Heroes, Heroines and Warriors - 2007-08
- Leishem Thanghai - 2008
- Phou-oibi, the rice goddess - 2009

=== Other works ===
- Pena Phamshak - Men's Ballad
- Moirang Sai - Women's Ballad

== Other website ==
- http://e-pao.net/epSubPageExtractor.asp?src=reviews.arts.Profile_on_laihui
