= Emoinu Fish Fest =

Fish festival dedicated to Meitei Goddess Emoinu

Emoinu Fish Fest (Meitei: Emoinu Ngaa Kumhei)
- Status: active
- Genre: fairs, festivals, conferences, exhibitions
- Frequency: Annually
- Venue: Hapta Kangjeibung
- Location: Imphal East
- Country: India
- Years active: 3
- Inaugurated: 3 January 2023
- Founder: Department of Fisheries, Government of Manipur
- Patrons: Department of Fisheries, Government of Manipur
- People: Meitei people

The Emoinu Fish Fest (Meitei: Emoinu Nga Kumhei), also known as the Imoinu Fish Festival (Note: The Meitei language term "Emoinu" is often also spelled as "Imoinu" in Latin script.)(Meitei: Imoinu Nga Kummei), is an annual grand fair, organised by the Department of Fisheries, Government of Manipur, on the 12th day of the Meitei lunar month of "Wakching", which is traditionally, the day of Emoinu Eratpa (Imoinu Iratpa), the sacred festival dedicated to Emoinu (Imoinu), the ancient Meitei goddess of wealth and prosperity. The first edition of the event was organised on 3 January 2023. The event was organised in the Hapta Kangjeibung in Imphal East district, Manipur.

The fish festival commenced from the morning of the very day, due to the fact that there was ritual ceremony during the nighttime. During this festival, "Sareng" (Meitei: ꯁꯥꯔꯦꯡ, romanized: sā-reng, lit. 'Wallago attu') was made available abundantly, besides other fish species.

== Objectives and services ==
The festival aims to provide fishes for religious offerings, with which the fishery sectors would be promoted for sustainable growth and development. It will also act as a "One Stop Solution" to the people for Emoinu Eratpa festival. In this event, fresh vegetables, fruits, fishes, etc. will be available with the participation of Department of Agriculture and various other departments of the Manipur Government as well as other privately owned commercials.

== Governmental terms and conditions ==
The Manipur Government mandates that the farmers should sell their fish at the price rate fixed by the department concerned. The transportation charges for the participating fish farmers will be borne by the governmental department. The department will provide the stalls at free of cost. The timing at which farmer should bring their fish products to the venue is between 9 AM to 11 AM.

According to an instruction by the Government, the fish sellers should bring their own weighing machines and should separately keep their fishes, species-wise, so that the governmental assessment officials could check them properly.

== See also ==
- Festival of Moirang Shai
- Ngaleima
- Ningol Chakkouba
- Sangai festival
