= Kachengwa Yengmaba =

- Khuman Ningthou
- Monarch: 400 CE - 450 CE
- Predecessor: Moilangpok Punshiba
- Successor: Adon Nongba Khomba
- Born: Adon Kacheng Wayenba
- Spouse: Wang-ngamlon Pengshiba Chanu Leirum Chengbi
- Issue: Adon Nongba Khomba
Names
- Adon Kajeng Wayenba
- Father: Moilangpok Punshiba
- Religion: Sanamahism

Adon Kachengwa Yengmaba (Note: also called "Kajengwa Yengmaba" (ꯀꯖꯦꯡꯋꯥ ꯌꯦꯡꯃꯥꯕ)) (Old Manipuri: Aton Kachengwa Yengmapa), also known as Adon Kajeng Wayenba (Old Manipuri: Aton Kacheng Wayenpa) was a king of the Khuman dynasty who ruled from 400 C.E to 450 C.E.

He was a contemporary of the Meitei king Pengsiba who ruled the Ningthouja dynasty from 428 C.E to 518 C.E.
