= Indira Oinam =

Indira Oinam (born 1 February 1975) is an Indian social activist and politician from Manipur. She is known for her work in women empowerment and child welfare, as well as her involvement in Manipur politics. Oinam has been associated with both the Bharatiya Janata Party (BJP) and the Indian National Congress (INC) at different times in her career. She is the Secretary of the Women's Income Generation Centre (WIGC) in Thoubal, Manipur.

== Early life and education ==
Indira Oinam was born on 1 February 1975 in Thoubal Ningombam, Thoubal District, Manipur, to Oinam Chaobhal Singh and Oinam (O) W. Ibemhal Devi. She was the sixth of nine children and the second daughter in her family.

She studied at Ningombam L.P. School and completed her HSLC examination in 1992 at Keinya Girls High School, Thoubal. Oinam graduated from Waikhom Mani Girls College, Thoubal, in 1998 with first-class honors in Education under Manipur University.

She grew up in a poor family and financed her education by working as a private tutor and doing embroidery work. Despite family discouragement, she completed her education and supported her younger sisters through their studies.

=== Childhood ===
During her school days, Oinam participated in debates and symposiums and often won first prizes. She faced hardships, including lack of family support during competitions. One incident during a debate competition in Class VII made her realize the emotional value of encouragement, as she received her first prize without her parents’ presence.

Another incident, when she was denied food by relatives as a child, inspired her to later establish an Ashram for Children, providing food, shelter, and education to orphans and underprivileged children.

== Early activities and NCC training ==
Oinam was active in the National Cadet Corps (NCC) as Senior Under Officer of the 65 Girls Unit in Manipur. She completed First Aid Training at Military Hospital, Shillong, and attended various NCC camps.

She received several awards for discipline and leadership, including:

- Governor's Medal (1995) for Best Cadet
- Duke of Edinburgh Award (Gold Standard), presented by Queen Elizabeth II

Although she received job offers to join the Army and other government services, she chose to work in the voluntary sector for social causes.

== Social work and WIGC ==
Oinam founded the Women's Income Generation Centre (WIGC) in Thoubal to support women and children from poor backgrounds. The centre provides:

- Skill training and vocational courses
- Support for handloom and handicraft workers
- Micro-finance through Self-Help Groups (SHGs)
- Shelter and education for destitute women and children

WIGC also runs ashrams for children, Swadhar homes for destitute women, and working women hostels. The organisation supports women in trades like Kouna (water reed) crafts, bamboo work, and tie-dye.

The centre conducts awareness programmes against human trafficking, especially for women and children, and collaborates with national schemes under various ministries of the Government of India.

== Major projects and programmes ==
Some projects under Oinam's leadership include:

- Vocational Training Courses for handloom and handicrafts
- Swadhar Shelter Home with helpline services
- Working Women Hostel with Day Care Centre
- Ashram for Working Children in Chandel District
- Training for Self-Help Groups and micro-loan facilities through SBI
- Campaigns against human trafficking
- Agasti Cultural Academy and Agasti Creative Bal Bhavan
- Environmental projects on medicinal plants

== Social involvements ==
Oinam has held various positions in social and voluntary organisations, including:

- President, Association for Paona Memorial Arts Rural Development Services (1994–1996)
- Member, District Peace Committee (1994–1999)
- Member, South Asian Fraternity (1996–2000)
- Chairperson, District Child Welfare Committee, Thoubal (from 2007)
- Service Provider under the Protection of Women from Domestic Violence Act (from 2008)

She is also an honorary Animal Welfare Officer with the All India Animal Welfare Board and a regular speaker for All India Radio, Imphal.

== Awards and recognitions ==
Oinam has received numerous awards for her work in youth development and social service:

- Devala Award (1992–93) – Government of Manipur
- National Youth Award (1994) – Presented by the President of India
- Governor's Gold Medal (1996) – Government of Manipur
- Duke of Edinburgh International Award (1996)
- UNDP Youth Volunteers Against Poverty Award (2000)
- Best Voluntary Award (2004–05) – Government of Manipur
- Prof. Yeshwantrao Kelkar Yuva Puraskar (2008) – ABVP and Vidyarthi Nidhi
- Stree Udhyami Award (2016) – for contribution to women empowerment

== Political career ==
=== Entry into politics ===
Driven by her interest in social service, Oinam joined the Bharatiya Janata Party (BJP). She contested the 2012 Manipur Assembly Election against Chief Minister Okram Ibobi Singh from the Thoubal constituency but lost by a narrow margin. Despite the defeat, her campaign helped strengthen BJP's presence in Manipur.

=== 2016 protest and party ticket issue ===
In May 2016, Oinam's supporters protested at the BJP office in Imphal after her name was not included in the list of candidates for the Inner Manipur Lok Sabha seat. Her supporters demanded the resignation of state party president Chaoba Thounaojam, alleging bias. Oinam claimed that her contributions, including her efforts during Prime Minister Narendra Modi's visit to Imphal, had been overlooked.

=== Joining the Indian National Congress ===
In 2017, Oinam left the BJP over the issue of ticket distribution. She joined the Indian National Congress along with around 7,000 supporters. She was appointed as the spokesperson of the Manipur Pradesh Congress Committee by State Congress president T. N. Haokip. Chief Minister Okram Ibobi Singh welcomed her into the party.

Oinam stated that she joined Congress because of its inclusive principles and her belief that the party would continue to form the government in Manipur.

== See also ==
- Oinam family
