= Menshomba =

- Khuman Ningthou
- Monarch: 830 C.E - 870 C.E
- Predecessor: Haoramton
- Successor: Thongleirom
- Spouse: Nganurol Chanu
- Issue: Thongleirom
- House: Khuman dynasty
- Father: Haoramton
- Mother: Nganurol Khongaiba Chanu
- Religion: Sanamahism
- Occupation: Monarch

Menshomba (also spelled Mensomba) was a king of the Khuman dynasty. He ruled from 830 CE to 870 CE.

He lived during the time of the Meitei king Ayangba, who ruled the Ningthouja dynasty from 821 CE to 910 CE.
