= Oinam Biramangol =

Oinam Biramangol Singh (ꯑꯣꯏꯅꯥꯝ ꯕꯤꯔꯃꯪꯒꯣꯜ ꯁꯤꯡꯍ, died April 27, 2019) was an Indian theatre artist and actor from Manipur. He was a Sangeet Natak Akademi Award recipient and was well known for his roles in Meitei theatre and radio plays.

== Early life and career ==
Oinam Biramangol Singh began his career in theatre as a child artist. He worked with several theatre groups including Raja Dumbra Singh Theatre, Aryan Theatre, and was a chairman of the Rupmahal Theatre. Over his lifetime, he acted in nearly 150 plays and directed many of them.

== Theatre work ==
He became popular for playing the role of Karna (a Mahabharata hero) in the radio plays Karnagi Mama (transl. Karna's mother) and Karnagi Aroiba Yahip (transl. Karna's dying bed), among others. At Rupmahal Theatre, he played the role of Bir Tikendrajit Singh in the play Bir Tikendrajit. His performance in this role was highly praised by audiences and peers.

== Awards and recognition ==
In 2016, Oinam Biramangol Singh received the Sangeet Natak Akademi Award for Acting. The award was presented by President Ram Nath Kovind. He was also conferred the Lifetime Achievement Award at the Manipur State Film Awards 2017 for his contribution to Meitei cinema.

== Felicitation by Rupmahal Theatre ==
On February 4, 2018, Rupmahal Theatre held a felicitation ceremony in honor of Oinam Biramangol Singh at its auditorium. The event was held along with the closing and award presentation ceremony of the 18th Rupmahal Artists Memorial Drama Festival – 2017.

== Death ==
Oinam Biramangol Singh passed away on April 27, 2019, at his residence in Wangkhei Angom Leikai, Imphal East. He was 94 years old.

== See also ==
- Oinam family
