= Moirang sai =

Traditional Meitei performing arts

Moirang Sai
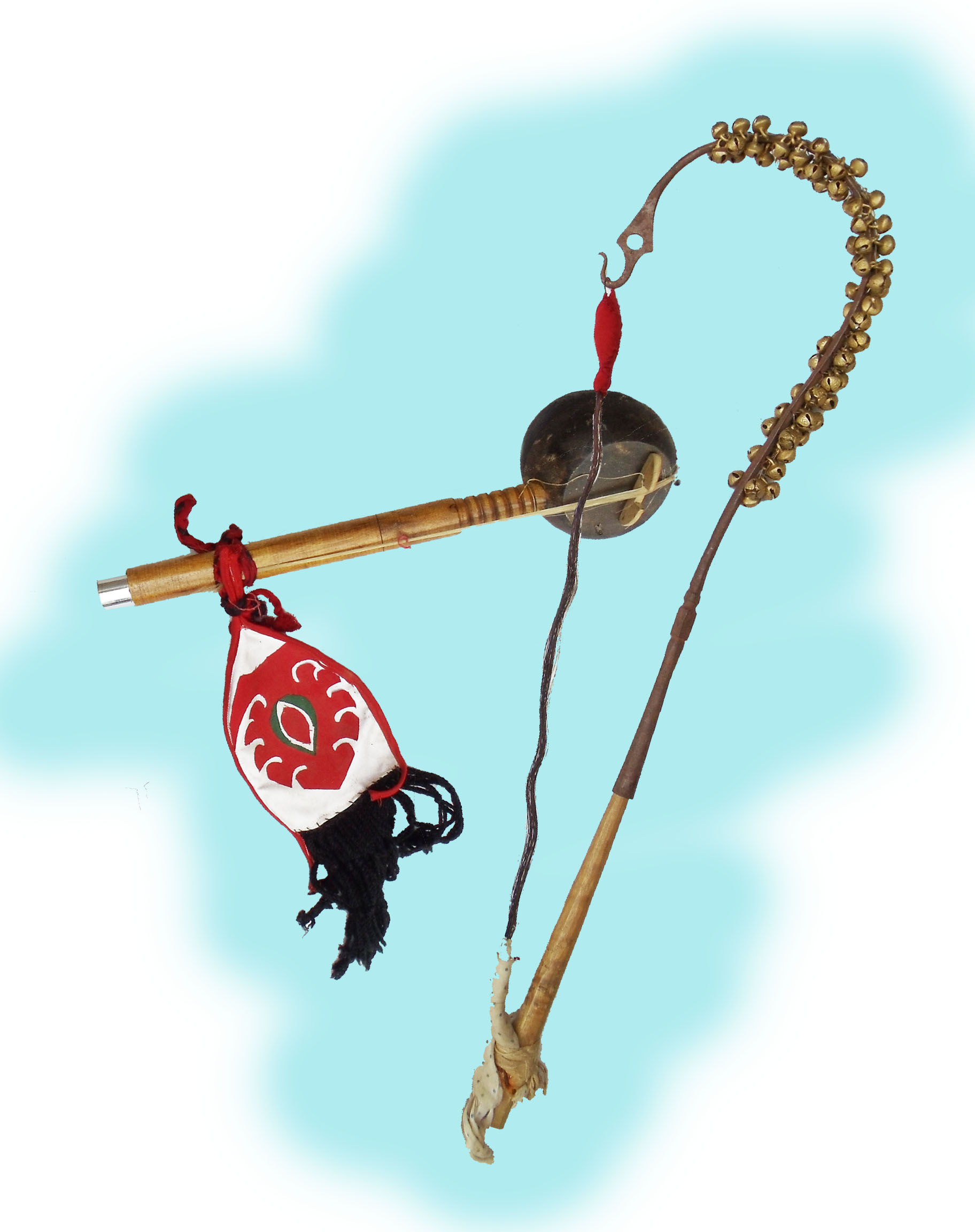
- Pena (musical instrument) is used in the performance of the "Moirang Sai"
- Originating culture: Meitei culture

Moirang sai is a traditional Meitei musical performing art form, that narrates the story of Khamba and Thoibi. The performance can span over 120 hours.

== Prime time ==
During the time period between the 1950s and the 1980s, Moirang Sai was performed popularly for entertainment in social gatherings and weddings. Traditional Meitei singer Ima Langathel Thoinu (Meitei: ꯏꯃꯥ ꯂꯥꯡꯉꯊꯦꯜ ꯊꯣꯏꯅꯨ) is regarded as the main stylist and the modern day pioneer of the art form. She developed the art form into a theatrical woman's musical performance, having pure Meitei Jagoi (Meitei: ꯃꯩꯇꯩ ꯖꯒꯣꯏ) dancing and singing genres. She gained her fame as the performer of the art from the 1960s to the 1990s.

== Endangerment ==
In the 1990s and 2000s, Moirang Sai became truly endangered due to the increasing popularity of Western rock music and the mainstream Hindi and Bengali music among the audience. Besides, people started shifting their interests from traditional art forms to modern arts of live folk theater. In the late 2000s, there were only 2 or 3 artists who were then performing the art actively. Later, there were little interest in the public regarding the revival of art form.

== Revival ==
In the 2010s, Ima Thoinu got only a few students to learn the endangered art form, which was the only means to keep it alive. Luckily, a small group of performers are again learning the nearly extinct art form of the Moirang Sai to save it from total extinction. Recently, Moirang Sai was outstandingly revived due to the hard works of Mangka Mayanglambam (Meitei: ꯃꯪꯀꯥ ꯃꯌꯥꯡꯂꯝꯕꯝ), a traditional Meitei folk singer and artist of the "Laihui" (Meitei: ꯂꯥꯏꯍꯨꯏ). Mangka is re-popularising the nearly extinct art form among the present youth once again.

Every year, the Hueiyen Lanpao Columnists' Forum organises the Hueiyen Rendezvous, which performs the "Moirang Sai" at the Literary Hall of Hueiyen Lanpao Office located at Sega Road Thouda Bhavok Leikai, Imphal.

On 4 October 2020, the Nongpok Ingouba Cultural Academy (NICA), Yairipok Top Chingtha Oinamthong Leirak, under the aegis of the Ministry of Culture, Government of India, organised a workshop cum production program, on "Moirang Sai" at the Yairipok Top Lai Community Hall, to protect and popularize the traditional art of 'Moirang Sai'.

== See also ==
- Epic cycles of incarnations in Moirang
- Shakuhachi meets Pena
- Nura Pakhang (Eu e Tu)
