= Oinam Bijando =

Meitei comedian and court official

Oinam Bijando (ꯑꯣꯏꯅꯥꯝ ꯕꯤꯖꯥꯟꯗꯣ), also known as Oina Bijando (ꯑꯣꯏꯅꯥ ꯕꯤꯖꯥꯟꯗꯣ), mononymously known as Bijando (ꯕꯤꯖꯥꯟꯗꯣ), was a Meitei comedian and court official who lived in the 19th century in the Manipur kingdom. He served in the court of Maharaja Chandrakirti Singh of the Ningthouja dynasty. Known primarily for his wit and rhetorical skills, he is a prominent figure in Meitei folklore.

== Historical context ==
Oinam Bijando lived during the reign of Maharaja Chandrakirti Singh (r. 1850–1886), a period in which the Manipur kingdom retained its sovereignty under the Ningthouja dynasty. The court maintained a structured administrative and cultural life, where humour and intellect were valued attributes in public discourse.

== Role in Court ==
Bijando held an informal yet influential role in the royal court. He was known for using humour and satire to engage with political and social topics, often through skits, caricature, and dialogic exchange. His speech, appearance, and dramatic performances were intended not only to amuse but also to critique and reflect on contemporary issues.

His rhetorical ability is often emphasised in folk narratives, particularly his skill in argument, assertion, and logical contention. These qualities enabled him to engage in discussions with the king and courtiers in a manner that combined entertainment with intellectual challenge.

== Folklore and anecdotes ==
Numerous Meitei folktales surround Oinam Bijando, many of which feature his interactions with Maharaja Chandrakirti Singh. Among the most well-known is the episode in which Bijando insists that an elephant be passed through a Tongjeimaril.

The Meitei proverb "Tongjei Marilda Shamu Litpa" (transl. an elephant passing through a Tongjeimaril) comes from Oinam Bijando, who didn't go to the palace in time. Later, he explained that he couldn't come in time because his naughty child wanted to make an elephant go through a narrow pipe (called a tongjei). This silly excuse became a saying to describe people who give ridiculous or impossible reasons to avoid something.

The term Tongjeimaril is linguistically composed of "Tongjei" (a narrow rubber pipe used for smoking through a Hidakphu, or hookah) and "Maril" (a passage or route). In the context of the anecdote, Tongjeimaril also refers to the hilly and narrow road connecting Bishnupur, Khoupum, and Nungba. The story is interpreted as metaphorical, possibly illustrating the impracticality of certain political decisions or the absurdity of rigid reasoning.

== Cultural legacy ==
Oinam Bijando remains a recognised figure in Meitei cultural history. His name is often invoked in contemporary Manipuri society to refer to individuals who display similar traits of wit, satire, or rhetorical skill. In colloquial usage, such individuals may be called "Bijando" or "Oinam Bijando."

He is frequently mentioned alongside other traditional Meitei comedians such as Abujam Saiton, Thokchao Thingbai Mera, and Kharibam Laisuba.

== Representation in media and literature ==
Bijando's life and legacy have been explored in various media and scholarly works. His biography, titled Oinam Bijando, authored by Leitanthem Heramot Meitei, was published in 1993. A radio drama series entitled Bijando Gi Lousing Wari (translated as The Wisdom Story of Bijando) was also produced and broadcast on Manipuri language radio channels.

In academic literature, scholars such as Moirangthem Kirti Singh have referenced Oinam Bijando in works including Religion and Culture of Manipur (1988) and Folk Culture of Manipur (1993), where he is discussed in the context of Manipuri performative traditions and court culture.

== Related pages ==
- Oinam family
- Birbal
- Nasreddin
