= Thongleirom =

- Khuman Ningthou
- Monarch: 870 C.E - 900 C.E
- Predecessor: Menshomba
- Successor: Chingkhong Thonggraiba
- Spouse: Nganurol Khaithiba Chanu
- Issue: Chingkhong Thonggraiba, Athingba
- House: Khuman dynasty
- Father: Menshomba
- Mother: Nganurol Chanu
- Religion: Sanamahism
- Occupation: Monarch

Thongleirom (Old Manipuri: ꯊꯣꯡꯂꯩꯂꯣꯝ, romanized: Thongleilom) was a king of the Khuman dynasty. He ruled from 870 CE to 900 CE.

He lived during the time of the Meitei king Ayangba, who ruled the Ningthouja dynasty from 821 CE to 910 CE.
