= Ziro Festival of Music =

Indian music festival

Ziro Festival of Music is an outdoor music festival held in Ziro, Arunachal Pradesh, India. It was founded in 2012 by Bobby Hano and Menwhopause guitarist Anup Kutty and has featured an eclectic mix of artists, ranging from Indus Creed to Rewben Mashangva.

The festival is spread over four days and is hosted by members of the Apatani people in Ziro, with an emphasis on emerging acts from Northeast India.
