= Oinam Mangi =

Indian sculptor (born 1955)

Oinam Mangi (ꯑꯣꯏꯅꯥꯝ ꯃꯪꯒꯤ, born 1955) is an Indian stone sculptor from Manipur, India. He has received the Bapu Sagat Jiban Award and the Dr Ambedkar Fellowship Award, in recognition of his contribution to sculpture art. His works are known for depicting traditional Meitei culture, historical figures, and daily life.

== Early life and education ==
Mangi was born in Toupokpi Village, Bishnupur district, Manipur, as the son of Ibonungshi, a professional stone carver. His father specialized in creating utility items such as chakri (stone rice grinders) and mortars. From an early age, Mangi was inspired by his father's work and began practicing stone carving while his father was away. Mangi's father initially opposed his pursuit of stone sculpture due to the low income from the profession, encouraging him instead to continue his studies. Mangi completed education up to Class X and also finished a Hindi Ratna course. He works with the support of his wife, three sons, a daughter, and other assistants. Stone sculpture provides his primary source of income and supports his family.

== Career ==
Mangi began practicing stone sculpture in 1980, following his father's footsteps. He has created numerous statues, busts, and memorial stones over the years. His works include:

- Mukna, a traditional Meitei wrestling game
- Statues of twenty-one Indian leaders
- Khambana Kao Phaba
- Irom Sharmila
- Shampot Khoiba Loumi, a farmer tilling a field with bulls
- Statues of breastfeeding women
- Monuments of historical figures such as Paona Brajabashi, Bir Tikendrajit, Thangal General, and Hijam Irabot
- The statue of poet Dr Lamabam Kamal, planned for installation in March 2026

He has displayed his sculptures in the Manipur Sangai Festival 2014 organized by the Manipur Tourism Department.

== Work process and materials ==
Mangi sources stones from Laimaton Hill at Old Cachar Road. Sculptures are created at his home with the help of assistants. The number of workers varies according to project size, ranging from five to over a hundred, with daily wages of Rs 1,000.

Prices for his sculptures vary: a passport-size carving costs Rs 75,000, while a life-size statue costs Rs 1.6 lakh. He produces carvings for customers within Manipur and from other regions, including Myanmar.

== Recognition and awards ==
Mangi has received around fourteen awards for his creative work.

- Bapu Sagat Jiban Award
- Dr Ambedkar Fellowship Award

His wife, Bilashini, is also a sculptor and has contributed to promoting his work.

Mangi has stated that he has not received substantial support from the State Government. He applied for a Rs 15 crore loan to purchase a sculpting machine, which he believes would increase efficiency and quality, but the government has not responded.

== Challenges and advocacy ==
Mangi has highlighted several challenges in his work:

- Manual carving is time-consuming and prone to errors
- Lack of government support for modern machinery
- Pending pension application despite crossing the age of 60

He has expressed the importance of stone carving in preserving Meitei culture, noting that forefathers engraved history on stones, and this tradition continues to promote the art and culture of the state.

== Notable projects ==
- Carving six twelve-foot pillars for the Manipur University of Culture, each representing different communities
- Sculptures of prominent historical and cultural figures in public spaces

== See also ==
- List of Indian artists
- List of sculptors
- Oinam family
