= Imphal Polo Ground =

Polo ground in India

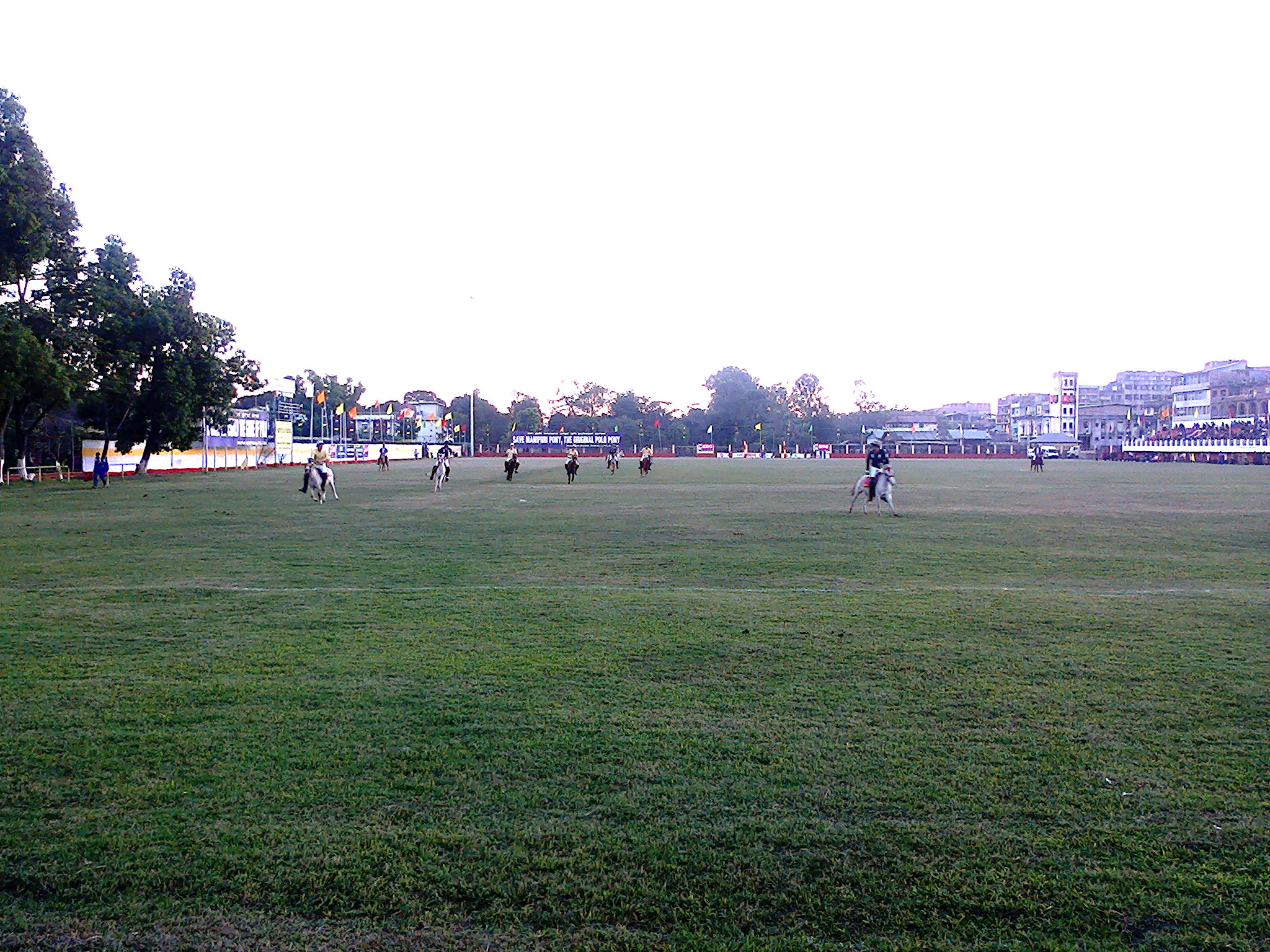

The Imphal Polo Ground (Meitei: ꯏꯝꯐꯥꯜ ꯀꯥꯡꯖꯩꯕꯨꯡ, Old Manipuri: ꯏꯝꯐꯥꯜ ꯀꯥꯡꯆꯩꯄꯨꯡ), originally known as Mapal Kangjeibung (Meitei: ꯃꯄꯥꯜ ꯀꯥꯡꯖꯩꯕꯨꯡ, Old Manipuri: ꯃꯄꯥꯜ ꯀꯥꯡꯆꯩꯄꯨꯡ), is the world's oldest polo ground, in Imphal, the metropolis of Manipur.

== Related pages ==
- Hapta Kangjeibung
- Manung Kangjeibung
