= Yairipok Thambalnu =

Historical Meitei woman

Yairipok Yairipok Thambalnu "-Nu"
- (Meitei: ꯌꯥꯏꯔꯤꯄꯣꯛ ꯊꯝꯕꯥꯜꯅꯨ)
- Pronunciation: yāi-rī-pok tham-bāl-nū
- Born: Sanoujam Chanu Thambalnu; Yairipok Poiroukhongjin, Yairipok
- Died: Imphal River
- Cause of death: drowning
- Era: During the reign of King Gambhir Singh (late medieval era (Note: in South Asian context))
- Known for: voluntary sacrifice of getting drowned in the Imphal River
- Relatives: Mother and younger brother
- Family: Sanoujam

Yairipok Thambalnu (Meitei: yāi-rī-pok tham-bāl-nū), originally known as Sanoujam Chanu Thambalnu or simply as Thambalnu (Meitei: tham-bāl-nū), was a Meitei lady native to Yairipok region of Kangleipak (Meitei for 'Manipur'). She was a victim of intrigues and was forced to meet a tragic death in drowning in a flooding river.

The tragedy of lady Yairipok Thambalnu is considered to be one of the most popular historical-legendary stories of Manipur.

== Name ==
In Meitei language, the word "Thambalnu" (Meitei: ꯊꯝꯕꯥꯜꯅꯨ, romanized: /tham-baal-noo/) literally means Lotus girl. Here, morphologically, "Thambal" (Meitei: ꯊꯝꯕꯥꯜ, romanized: /tham-baal/) is a Meitei term for lotus and "nu" (Meitei: ꯅꯨ, romanized: /noo/) is a feminine suffix frequently used in Meitei vocabularies.

== Background ==
Thambalnu was brought up by a poor widowed mother in Yairipok Poiroukhongjin (Meitei: ꯌꯥꯏꯔꯤꯄꯣꯛ ꯄꯣꯏꯔꯧꯈꯣꯡꯖꯤꯟ). She was known for her beauty and had mild and decent character. It is said that many people desired her to be the daughter-in-law of their families. She was friendly with everyone in the village. Mohon Singh (Meitei: ꯃꯣꯍꯣꯟ ꯁꯤꯡꯍ) from Yairipok Khunjao (Meitei: ꯌꯥꯏꯔꯤꯄꯣꯛ ꯈꯨꯟꯖꯥꯎ), a poor man, brought up by a widowed mother, like her, fell in love with her. The two eventually become lovers. Coincidentally, Pranam Singh Selungba (Meitei: ꯄ꯭ꯔꯅꯥꯝ ꯁꯤꯡꯍ ꯁꯦꯂꯨꯡꯕ), a man of elite family, who was a royal court official in service to Manipur's ruler Gambhir Singh (Meitei: ꯒꯝꯚꯤꯔ ꯁꯤꯡꯍ) (1825–1833), was also in love with Thambalnu. The love of Mohon Singh and Thambalnu was frequently disturbed by Pranam Singh. As a result, the discord and enmity between Pranam Singh and Mohon Singh grew increasingly hostile over time. Every time whenever a conflict occurred, Thambalnu always tried to bring concord.

== Sacrificial tragedy ==
It once happened that there was rupture of the eastern banks of the Imphal River (Meitei: ꯏꯝꯐꯥꯜ ꯇꯨꯔꯦꯜ, romanized: Imphal Turel) in the regions of Wangoi (Laluthem, Kyamgei near Leisangkhong). On this matter, King Gambhir Singh offered prayers to God Ibudhou Khana Chaoba (Meitei: ꯏꯕꯨꯙꯧ ꯈꯥꯅ ꯆꯥꯎꯕ), to show him a way to fix it. Through an oracle, the God suggested that a girl should be offered to Him. Lady Thambalnu willingly sacrificed herself for the bunding of the fissure by the Imphal River, so as to save the lives of everyone in the kingdom from the disastrous flood. Another main reason for her voluntary sacrifice was that she assumed that her death would rescue her lover Mohon Singh from the cruel acts of Pranam Singh. Later on, the story of her sacrifice for the people of the kingdom of Manipur got immortalized.

Regarding human sacrifice to the gods, in relation to the case of lady Yairipok Thambalnu, scholar Moirangthem Kirti Singh (Meitei: ꯃꯣꯏꯔꯥꯡꯊꯦꯝ ꯀꯤꯔꯇꯤ ꯁꯤꯡꯍ) noted:

"... The idea of altruism or voluntary sacrifice in order to ensure the welfare of the country was associated with the names of Pangan Langanubi (a Manipuri Muslim woman) and Yairipok Thambalnu. A human victim is sacrificed at the construction of a river bund, dams or bridge to the presiding deity so that the public might be free from the troubles. The bards or asheibas immortalized the names of these ladies by their tunes and beating of dholak in the assembly of the elderly ..."

— Folk Culture of Manipur (1993)

== Legacy ==
In Meitei tradition, elders, in their attempts to stop children from wandering away from their vision, used to make them afraid, by narrating the story of lady Thambalnu of Yairipok, about her being sacrificed and drowned to appease gods when the river embankments were ruptured. The elders even tell their children that Thambalnu's soul stayed in a fig tree.

== In literature ==
=== In Meitei literature ===
This is a list of Meitei language literary works, dedicated to Yairipok Thambalnu:

Year of publication	Original title (in Meitei & Eastern Nagari)	Romanization	Name of the book (if it's a part of it)	Author	Type of work (Prose/Poetry/Drama)	Ref.
1966	ꯊꯝꯕꯥꯜꯅꯨ ꯁꯩꯔꯦꯡ; থম্বালনু শৈরেং	Thambalnu Seireng	Thambalnu Seireng (Note: The entire book is dedicated to her.)	Nandakishor Sharma, M	Epic poetry	
1970	ꯌꯥꯏꯔꯤꯄꯣꯛ ꯊꯝꯕꯥꯜꯅꯨ; য়াইরিপোক থম্বালনু	Yairipok Thambalnu	Anouba Yenning	Kokngang Singh, P.	Prose narrative	
1984	ꯊꯝꯕꯥꯜꯅꯨ; থম্বালনু	Thambalnu	Kadomdano Manipur	Mayanglambam Ibomcha Singh	Poetry	
1986	ꯌꯥꯏꯔꯤꯄꯣꯛ ꯊꯝꯕꯥꯜꯅꯨ; য়াইরিপোক থম্বালনু	Yairipok Thambalnu	Manipur Sumang Leela Amasung Wareng Makhal Makha	Ibobi Singh, Ningombam	Prose narrative	
2005	ꯊꯝꯕꯥꯜꯅꯨ; থম্বালনু	Thambalnu	Eigi Nupagi Macha	Satyabati, Haobam	Prose narrative	
2008	ꯌꯥꯏꯔꯤꯄꯣꯛ ꯊꯝꯕꯥꯜꯅꯨ; য়াইরিপোক থম্বালনু	Yairipok Thambalnu	Apunba Saklon	Kokngang Singh, P.	Poetry	

=== In other languages' literature ===
In a poem "A Bequeath for You", written by Jodha Chandra Sanasam (Meitei: ꯖꯣꯙꯥ ꯆꯟꯗ꯭ꯔ ꯁꯅꯁꯝ), dedicated to different women in Meitei culture, he mentioned lady Yairipok Thambalnu, as follows:

"... I don't know why I want them
to appear in front of me today
Nongpok Panthoibee, Moirang Thoibee,
Yaithing Konu, Nura Shanthalembee,
Ingallei, Yairipok Thambalnu,
who else left? O yes, Madhabee, Jehera,
or Irom Sharmila!
I am not sure
I want to ask them about love! ..."

— a paragraph from "A Bequeath for You" by Jodha Chandra Sanasam

== In Meitei cinema ==
- In 1984, a Meitei language film titled "Yairipok Thambalnu" (Meitei: ꯌꯥꯏꯔꯤꯄꯣꯛ ꯊꯝꯕꯥꯜꯅꯨ) was produced in black and white celluloid film format. It was converted into digital film by the National Film Archive of India under the "National Film Heritage Mission" of the Ministry of Information and Broadcasting (India) and re-distributed by the Manipur State Film Development Society (MSFDS) in January 2023. It was based on the real story of lady Thambalnu of Yairipok, showing her bravery and ability to sacrifice her life for society departing her near and dear ones.

== In theaters ==
=== Thambalnu (1965 play) ===
Thambalnu, a 1965 drama, was directed by Ng. Purna Chandra and produced by Maibam Ramcharan (1928–1995). It was performed notably in the Nehru Hall of Hojai in Assam.

=== Thambalnu (1976 play) ===
Thambalnu (1976 play) is a modern Meitei drama, composed by playwright B.K. Wahengba, directed and produced by Heisnam Kanhailal.

=== Thambalnu (1990s) (Note: exact year not known) ===
In 1990s, Thambalnu, based on the romantic Meitei tragedy, written by Bachaspatimayum Jayantakumar Sharma, was translated by A. Krishna Mohant Nishant, and was performed by the 2nd year students of the National School of Drama (NSD).

=== Thambalnu (Hindi language) ===
Thambalnu, a Hindi language drama, was directed by Ratan Thiyam for the students of National School of Drama (NSD). In the play, the cultural elements of the Lai Haraoba and Manipuri dances were shown in a meaningful manner, highlighting the folk culture of Manipur.

== Memorials ==
The "Yairipok Thambalnu Sahitya Marup cum Library" (Meitei: ꯌꯥꯏꯔꯤꯄꯣꯛ ꯊꯝꯕꯥꯜꯅꯨ ꯁꯥꯍꯤꯇ꯭ꯌ ꯃꯔꯨꯞ ꯀꯝ ꯂꯥꯏꯕ꯭ꯔꯦꯔꯤ) is a literary organisation based in Manipur. It annually bestows awards to the prestigious "Usham Nilachandra Ningsing Khorirol Mana" (Meitei for 'Usham Nilachandra memorial literary Award') to writers who contributed to Meitei literature (Manipuri literature). In December 2022, it gave the award to "Ningtambagi Machu" (Meitei: ꯅꯤꯡꯇꯝꯕꯒꯤ ꯃꯆꯨ, lit. 'colour of freedom'), a poetry book written by Rajeshori Yengkhom.

The Yairipok Thambalnu Keithel (Meitei for 'Yairipok Thambalnu Market') in Imphal East district annually hosts the "State Level Pineapple Festival cum Buyers and Sellers Meet & Youth Festival", including the "Pineapple Queen contest", under the North-East Council and Horticulture and Soil Conservation, Government of Manipur.

== Namesake ==
=== Educational institution ===
In December 2022, the "Yairipok Thambalnu Higher Secondary School" (alias "Thambalnu Higher Secondary School" (Note: Some sources mention the name without the prefix "Yairipok".)) of Yairipok, Thoubal district was frequently mentioned in media channels, because 7 students ("10" in some news) of this institution, were killed and over 35 students of the same, got injured, in a road accident that happened in Longsai part-III village in Noney district of Manipur. Two buses (one for boys and another for girls) carrying students of the school were going on an excursion to the Khoupum valley in Noney district. One bus (carrying girl students) fell off a cliff near a village, which took the students' lives instantly. The unfortunate incident of the "Yairipok Thambalnu Higher Secondary School" was condoled by the "Yairipok Thambalnu Sahitya Marup cum Library".

=== Sports club ===
The "Thambalnu Market Football Club" is a football club based in Yairipok, Thoubal district. Notably, in 2009, it achieved the winner's trophy of the "Fifth Th. Shyamkumar Invitation Prize Money Football Tournament", winning ₹50,000 (equivalent to ₹130,000 or US$1,500 in 2023), by defeating its opponent, "Top Chingtha Development Organisation", by 2–0 in the final, held at Yairipok.

== See also ==
=== Others ===
- Animals in Meitei culture
- Birds in Meitei culture
- Hills and mountains in Meitei culture
- Plants in Meitei culture
- Women in Meitei culture
  - Chakpa Makhao Ngambi
  - Haolok Konthousu (Chingphulon Konthousu)
  - Kumcha Lempi
  - Kuranganayani
  - Sandrembi and Chaisra
  - Thabaton
  - Thoibi
