= Music of Manipur =

Manipur is a region of North-East India. Some varieties of folk music from the area include the rural love songs Khullang Eshei, the rhythmic Lai Haraoba eshei, which contain lyrics with veiled references to erotic mysticism and pena eshei, which is accompanied by a pena, an instrument made from a bamboo rod and the shell of a gourd or coconut. The pena is an ancient instrument that is a sort of national symbol for Manipuris.

Nat (a shortened form of Meitei Nat Sankirtan) is a classical form of music of Manipur. It is a product of the Sanskritisation of traditional Meitei culture with Hindu culture by the Brahmanas, having 6 ragas and 36 raginis.

Classical Nat music is performed at various special occasions, the women's devotional nupi pala songs, Gaur Padas, sung in praise of Chaitanya Mahaprabhu and dhob, sung accompanied by the jhal, a large cymbal. Manohar Sai is another important class of songs, devoted to a 19th-century man of the same name. Khubakeshei is a kind of song accompanied entirely by clapping.

Contrasting to the other forms of Indian classical music, which are performed by sitting, in the Meitei Nata-Sankirtana, artists perform musical instruments as well as sing songs, simultaneously performing the delicate movements of the body and hands, based on the form of Khuthek Anoi (Meitei for 'language of hand movements'), aligning to different footsteps, based on the Khongthang Anoi (Meitei for 'language of footsteps').
