= Mayang Imphal =

- Town
- Location in Manipur, India Mayang Imphal (India)
- Coordinates: 24.60°N 93.90°E
- Country: India
- State: Manipur
- District: Imphal West

Population (2001)
  - Total: 24,239

Languages
  - Official: Meiteilon (Manipuri)
- Time zone: UTC+5:30 (IST)
- PIN: 795132
- Vehicle registration: MN
- Website: manipur.gov.in

Mayang Imphal is a town and municipal council in Imphal West district in the Indian state of Manipur. Pin code of Mayang Imphal is 795132.

== Geography ==
Mayang Imphal is located at 24.60°N 93.90°E on the bank of the Imphal river, a tributary of the Manipur river, joining the latter in Thoubal district. To the southwest of Mayang Imphal is the Loktak Lake, which is the largest fresh-water lake in northeast India.

== Demographics ==
As of the 2001 Indian census, Mayang Imphal had a population of 20,536. Males and females each constituted 50% of the population. Mayang Imphal has an average literacy rate of 56%, lower than the national average of 59.5%: male literacy is 67%, and female literacy is 45%. In Mayang Imphal, 17% of the population is under 6 years of age. The population comprises different religions such as the Hindus, Muslims (also called the Meitei Pangals), the Meitei Ancient Religion, and Christians.

== Politics ==
Mayang Imphal is part of the Lok Sabha constituency of Inner Manipur and it is the 23rd constituency of Manipur Legislative Assembly.
