= Pena (musical instrument) =

Traditional musical instrument of Kangleipak

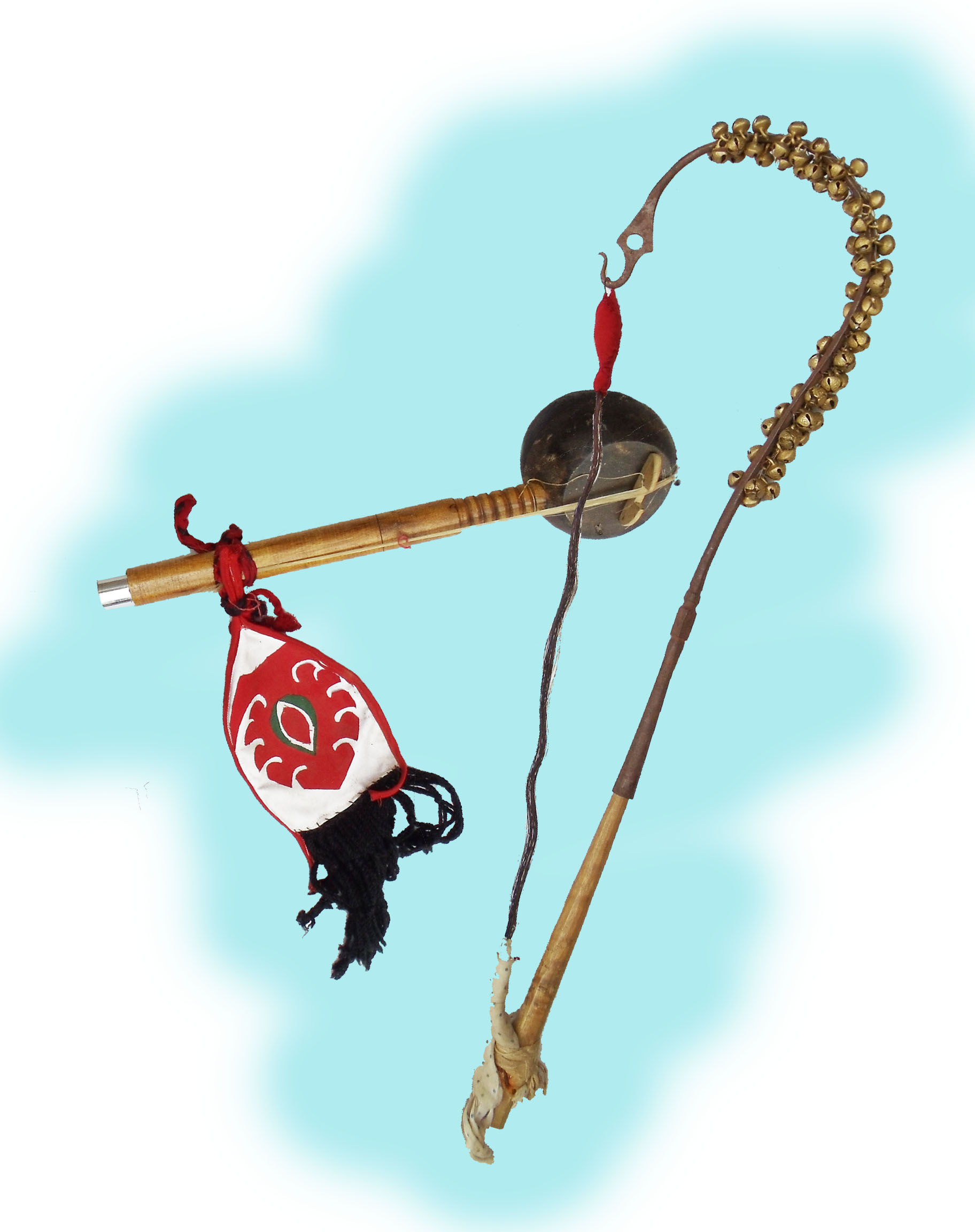
- Pena
- Classification: String

Related instruments
- Lute, Violin

Pena is a mono string instrument falling in the lute category, slightly similar to some of the traditional Indian stringed musical instruments such as the ravanahatha, ubo or the kenda. It is the traditional musical instrument of Manipur, used mainly in the Lai Haraoba festival of Sanamahism. Pena playing has become rare, with only 145 active Pena players reported in Manipur. The Center for Research on Traditional and Indigenous Art (Laihui), an organization headed by renowned pena player, Khangembam Mangi Singh has mandated vision to revive pena music.

== History ==
The Pena, one of the oldest traditional Meitei musical instruments, was once a part of luxurious living and was played at the royal gatherings in Kangleipak.

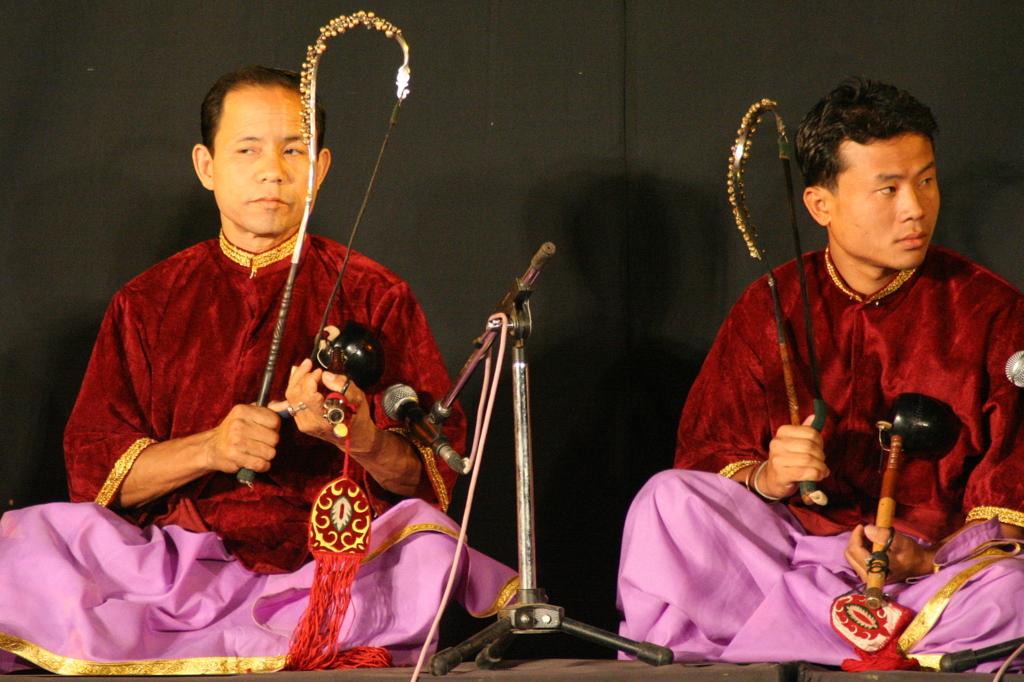
Pena Players

== Construction ==
The instrument consist of two parts, the main body, penamasa or dhorr which is similar to that of a violin and the bow, pena cheijing or chorr, which is more resembling an archery bow than a violin bow. The main body is made out of bamboo, 10 to 11 inches long and 1 to 1.25 inches girth, which is fixed to a coconut shell cut in half, through two holes bore through the shell. Two additional holes are also drilled on the coconut shell for acoustic purposes, one of which is covered by dried animal skin such as iguana skin and the other, left open. The tension of the string is controlled by a bamboo peg, called kaan and is fitted inside a hole drilled on the bamboo rod. A scroll, mogra, is also tied to the instrument tail.

The bow is wooden and bears a curved flourish at one end which is made of metal. In some parts, the bow also features tiny metal bells. The string is traditionally made of horse hair but, sometimes, metal strings and strings made out of wood fiber are also used.

== Well-known performers ==
- Khangembam Mangi Singh
- Guru N.G. Ibopishak
- Leimapokpam Yaima
- Mayanglambam Mangangsana

== See also ==
- Music of Manipur
- Lute
