= List of kings of the Ningthouja dynasty =

List of rulers of Indian state of Manipur

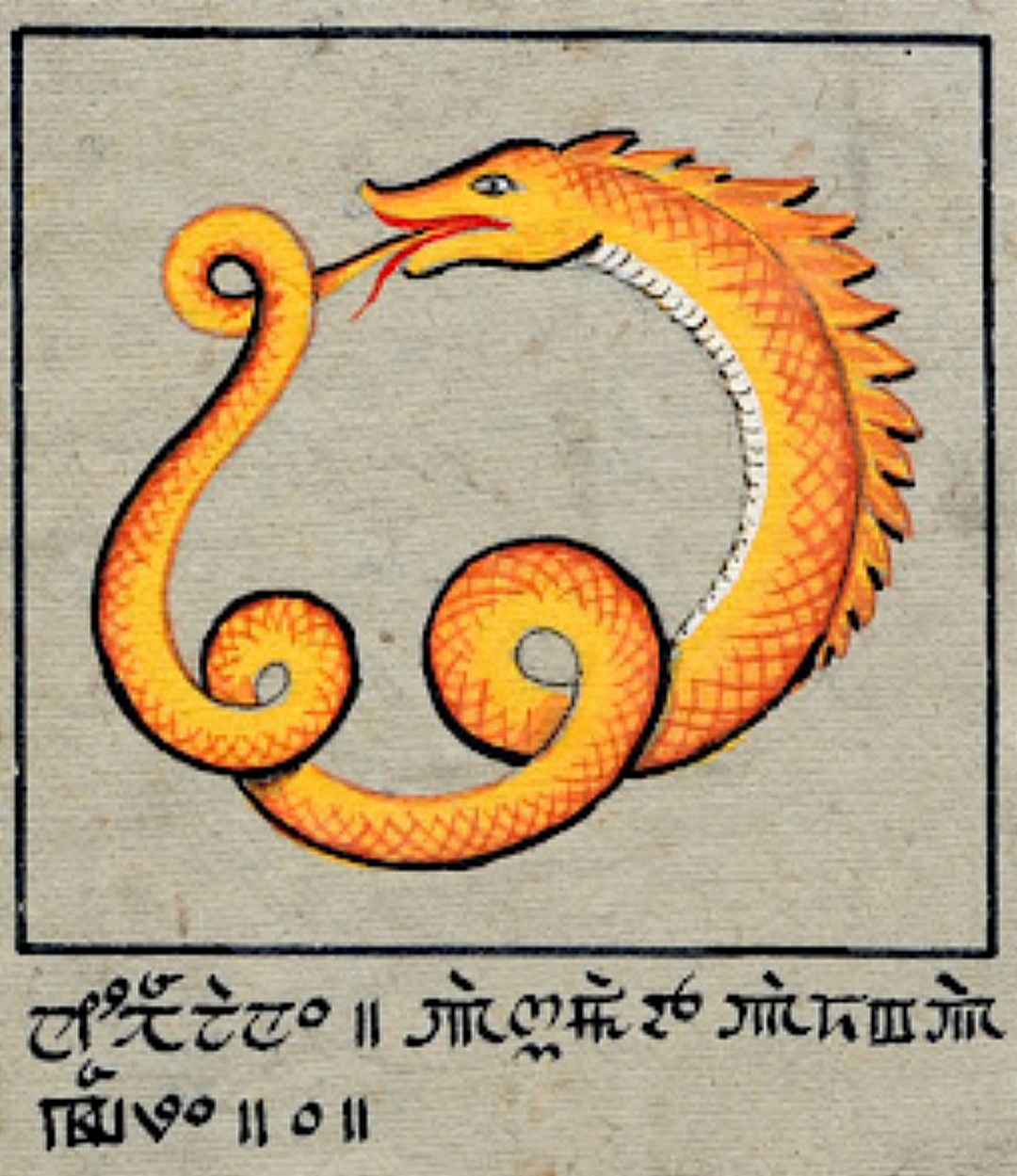
Classical Meitei illuminated manuscript painting, depicting a “Paphal” of a totemic Meitei dragon of the Ningthouja (Mangang) clan, from the “Pakhangba Lambuba”, an ancient Meitei language text

Location of Manipur in Republic of India

This is a list of Meitei kings of the Ningthouja dynasty (alias Meitei dynasty), who ruled from 33 AD and later reigned over the Kingdom of Manipur after its establishment in 1110 AD as they are recorded in the Royal Chronicle of Manipur (Cheitharol Kumbaba). The Chronicle was reconstructed during the 18th century, with unknown provenance of the earlier sections and, according to scholars, its historicity is assured only for the portions after 1485.

The Ningthouja dynasty was founded by King Nongda Lairen Pakhangba in 33 AD, who assumed the title Meidingu for the later kings belonging to the dynasty, after defeating the once powerful Khabas. Before he took the throne, the salais or clans were already in existence and they each had their own kings and territories. Nongda Lairen Pakhangba initiated the process of unification of the warring ethnic groups and principalities groups, which led to the formation of Manipur realm, under the political supremacy of the Ningthouja dynasty in the first century AD.

The Kingdom of Kangleipak with written constitution was established in 1110 AD by King Loiyumba of the Ningthouja dynasty, who incorporated most neighboring principalities, with the Ningthouja dynasty as ruling house of the kingdom. The Kangleipak kings expanded their territory, reaching their zenith under king Khagemba (1597–1652 AD). In 1714, a king named Pamheiba adopted Hinduism. He adopted the name Gharib Nawaz, and in 1724 renamed the kingdom as "Manipur" (Sanskrit for "abode of jewels"). Manipur was conquered by Burma in 1819 AD, and became a Princely State within the British Raj in 1825 AD till 1947 AD.

On 11 August 1947 AD, Maharajah of Manipur Bodhchandra Singh signed the Instrument of Accession joining the Union of India while retaining internal autonomy. In October 1949, he further signed a merger agreement with India allegedly under coercion. Manipur then became a part C state of the Republic of India governed by the Constitution of India.

== List ==
- Nongdā Lāiren Pākhangba (33–154 AD), founder of dynasty
- Khuyoi Tompok (154–264 AD)
- Taothingmang (264–364 AD)
- Khui Ningomba (364–379 AD)
- Pengsiba (379–394 AD)
- Kaokhangba (394–411 AD)
- Naokhamba (411–428 AD)
- Naophangba (428–518 AD)
- Sameirang (518–568 AD)
- Ura Konthouba (568–658 AD)
- Naothingkhong (663–763 AD)
- Khongtekcha (763–773 AD)
- Keirencha (784–799 AD)
- Yaraba (799–821 AD)
- Ayangba (821–910 AD)
- Ningthoucheng (910–949 AD)
- Chenglei-Ipan-Lanthaba (949–969 AD)
- Keiphaba Yanglou (969–984 AD)
- Irengba (984–1074 AD)
- Loiyumba (1074–1122 AD), he provided the Meetei kingdom with a written constitution which is known as the Loiyumpa Silyel (Loiyumba Sinyen).
- Loitongba (1122–1150 AD)
- Atom Yoiremba (1150–1163 AD)
- Iwanthaba (1163–1195 AD)
- Thawanthaba (1195–1231 AD)
- Chingthang Lanthaba (1231–1242 AD)
- Thingbai Shelhongba (1242–1247 AD)
- Puranthaba (–1263 AD)
- Khumomba (1263–1278 AD)
- Moiramba (1278–1302 AD)
- Thangbi Lanthaba (1302–1324 AD)
- Kongyamba (1324–1335 AD)
- Telheiba (1335–1355 AD)
- Tonaba (1355–1359 AD)
- Tabungba (1359–1394 AD)
- Lairenba (1394–1399 AD)
- Punsiba (1404–1432 AD)
- Ningthoukhomba (1432–1467 AD)
- Senbi Kiyamba (1467–1508 AD)
- Koiremba (1508–1512 AD)
- Lamkyamba (1512–1523 AD)
- Nonginphaba (1523–1524 AD)
- Kabomba (1524–1542 AD)
- Tangjamba (1542–1545 AD)
- Chalamba (1545–1562 AD)
- Senbi Mungyamba (1562–1597 AD)
- Khagemba(1597–1652 AD)
- Khunjaoba (1652–1666 AD)
- Paikhomba (1666–1697 AD)
- Charairongba (1697–1709 AD)
- Gharib Nawaz (Pamheiba) (1709–1748 AD), adopted name of Manipur.
- Chitsai (1748–1751 AD)
- Bharatsai (1752 AD)
- Gaurisiam (1753-1759 AD and 1761-1763 AD)
- Bhagya Chandra (Ching-Thang Khomba) (1759-1760 AD and 1763–1798 AD)
- Rabinchandra (Harshachandra, Labanyachandra) (1798–1801 AD), son of Bhagya Chandra
- Madhuchandra (1801–1804 AD), brother of Rabinchandra
- Chourjit Singh (1804–1814 AD), brother of Madhuchandra
- Marjit Singh (1814–1819 AD), brother of Chourjit Singh, vassal of Burma (Alaungpaya)

=== Burmese rule in Manipur (1819–1825 AD) ===
There were some puppet kings of Manipur during the Seven Years Devastation (Chahi Taret Khuntakpa). They were:

- Yumjaotaba (1820 AD), son of Madhuchandra
- Gambhir Singh (1821 AD, 6 months), brother of Marjit Singh
- Jai Singh (1822 AD)
- Jadu Singh (Nongpok Chinglenkhomba) (1823 AD)
- Raghab Singh (1823-1824 AD)
- Bhadrasing (1824 AD), father of Nara Singh

=== British protectorate of Manipur (1824-1891 AD) ===
Manipur became a British protectorate after the outbreak of the First Anglo-Burmese War. The kings were:

- Gambhir Singh (Chinglen Nongdrenkhomba) (1825–1834 AD), restored after the First Anglo-Burmese War
- Regency for Chandrakirti Singh (1834–1850 AD)
- Nara Singh (1844–1850 AD), son of Bhadra Singh
- Debendro Singh (1850 AD), brother of Nara Singh
- Chandrakirti Singh (1850–1886 AD), son of Gambhir Singh
- Surchandra Singh (1886–1890 AD)
- Kulachandra Singh (1890–1891 AD)

=== Princely state of Manipur (1891-1949 AD) ===
Manipur became a princely state after the Anglo-Manipur War. The kings were:

- Churachand Singh (1891–1941 AD)
- Bodhchandra Singh (1941-1949 AD)

Military and political power were exercised by the general commanding British forces in Manipur

=== Dominion of India and Republic of India ===
==== Sovereign State of Manipur ====
- Bodhchandra Singh (1947–1949 AD), last official ruler of Manipur

==== Titular rulers ====
- Bodhchandra Singh (1949–1955 AD)
- Pareihanba Okendro (1955–1976 AD)
- Leishemba Sanajaoba (1976–present)

== See also ==
- Manipur
- History of Manipur
- Manipur (princely state)
- Meitei people
- Meitei calendar
- Hinduism in Manipur
- History of India
- List of Indian monarchs
