= Irengba =

- Meitei Ningthou

King of Ningthouja dynasty
- Monarchy: 983 CE - 1073 CE
- Coronation: 983 CE
- Predecessor: Yanglou Keiphaba
- Successor: Loiyumba
- Died: 1073 CE
- Issue: Loiyumba
Names
- Meidingu Kainou Irengba
- House: Ningthouja dynasty
- Father: Yanglou Keiphaba
- Religion: Sanamahism
- Occupation: Monarch of the Ningthouja dynasty

Meidingu Kainou Irengba was a Meitei king of the Ningthouja dynasty of Ancient Kangleipak (early Manipur) who ruled from 983 CE to 1073 CE. He fought the Moirangs at Ithai and was victorious. He succeeded his father Yanglou Keiphaba, and was succeeded by his son Loiyumba.

The Heikru Hidongba festival was first celebrated during the reign of Irengba.
