= Chenglei Ipan Lanthaba =

- Meidingu
- Monarchy: 949 CE - 969 CE
- Coronation: 949 CE
- Predecessor: Ningthoucheng
- Successor: Yanglou Keiphaba
- Issue: Yanglou Keiphaba
- House: Ningthouja dynasty
- Father: Ningthoucheng
- Religion: Sanamahism
- Occupation: Monarch of the Ningthouja dynasty

Chenglei Ipan Lanthaba was a Meitei king belonging to the Ningthouja dynasty of Ancient Kangleipak (early Manipur), who reigned from 949 CE to 969 CE. During his reign, individuals belonging to the Luwang clan approached the Luwangli (Luwangyi) River and were subsequently defeated by him.

He was the son of Ningthoucheng and the father of Yanglou Keiphaba.
