= Nongdā Lāiren Pākhangbā =

King of Manipur from 33 to 54 CE

Nongda Lairen Pakhangba
- "Maker of Manipur"; Ningthou

King of Manipur
- Monarch: 33 C.E - 154 C.E
- Coronation: 33 CE
- Successor: Khuyoi Tompok
- Born: Unknown
- Died: see here
- Consort: Leima Laisana
Names
- Meitingu Nongta Lailen Pakhangpa
- Ancient Meitei: Nongtā Lāilen Pākhangpa
- Dynasty: Ningthouja (Old Manipuri: ꯅꯤꯡꯊꯧꯆꯥ, romanized: ningthoucha)
- Mother: Cakha Nuron Piron Yambi
- Religion: Sanamahism

Nongda Lairen Pakhangba (Old Manipuri: ꯅꯣꯡꯇꯥ ꯂꯥꯏꯂꯦꯟ ꯄꯥꯈꯪꯄ, romanized: nongtā lāilen pākhangpa, or Meitei: ꯅꯣꯡꯗꯥ ꯂꯥꯢꯔꯦꯟ ꯄꯥꯈꯪꯕ, romanized: nongdā lāiren pākhangba), was the first Meitei monarch of the Ningthouja dynasty, who ascended the throne of the Kangla of Kangleipak (Meitei for 'Manipur') realm) in 33 AD, after the withdrawal of the mainstream powers of the Khabas. (Note: Padma Shri awardee scholar Ningthoukhongjam Khelchandra mentioned it in the page 37 of his article Sources of the History of Manipur, quoting information from ancient texts including but not limited to the Pakhangba Laihui and the Panthoibi Khongul.) Before the reign of king Nongda Lairen Pakhangba, the clans, or salais were already in existence.

The ancient flag of Kangleipak (Manipur), with the seven colours depicting the seven clan dynasties

Nongda Lairen Pakhangba initiated the process of unification of the warring ethnic groups and principalities groups, which led to the formation of Manipur realm, under the political supremacy of the Ningthouja dynasty in the first century AD. Nongda Lairen used the title Pakhangba, and he appears in literature and mythology as a human incarnation of God Pakhangba.

According to some scholars including Sujit Mukherjee, Nongda Lairen Pakhangba ruled for 21 years, from 33 to 54 AD. The list of Meitei kings was recorded in the Cheitharol Kumbaba, which survives in several versions, the most authentic of which is preserved in the Royal Palace of Manipur. and in the Chada Laihui, which contains information about their parentage and the important events of their reigns. Coins were issued by Nongda Lairen Pakhangba.

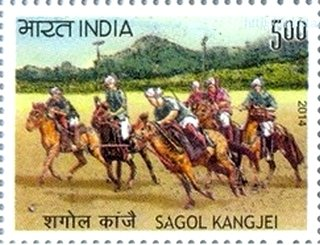
A Sagol Kangjei (polo) match depicted on an Indian stamp.

A historic Sagol Kangjei (polo) match was organised by Nongda Lairen Pakhangba, which was played by his friends, in the Imphal Polo Ground, the oldest Polo Ground in the world.

== Rise to power ==
Nongda Lairen Pakhangba subjugated the powers of Sorarel Ariba Ahum, who were the chiefs of three clans, Salai Leishangthem, Luwang and Kha Nganpa. (Note: This is mentioned in the ancient Meitei text Chengleiron.) Poreiton challenged Nongda Lairen Pakhangba for the throne of the Kangla, but was defeated. Other clans, including the Salai Leishangthem and Kha Nganpa lost their sovereignty. The Angoms and the Luwang, though independent, shared their political powers with the King.

== Family ==
Nongda Lairen Pakhangba's queen consort, Leima Leisana, was a priestess (Meitei: ꯃꯥꯏꯕꯤ). According to legend, Leisana and her brother Poireiton had their origin from a distant place in the east. When she and her brother came to the realm of Nongda Lairen Pakhangba, they were accompanied by the Poirei people. She brought with her two hundred varieties of fruits and vegetables.

== Law and order ==
The supreme court (Meitei: ꯀꯨꯆꯨ) was established during the reign of Nongda Lairen Pakhangba. It presided over legal both criminal and civil cases. The king was the president of the court, and his nobles and ministers served as its members. The Kuchu also handled women's cases. The concept of the liberation of women was already prevalent in that era. The roles of women in their families' decision making processes were significant.

Lower courts (Meitei: ꯆꯩꯔꯥꯞ) were also established.

The Patcha Loishang (women's court) was established during the reign of Nongda Lairen Pakhangba. This court dealt with all women-related crimes and protected women's rights and privileges. Queen Laisna presided over the court, .

The lallup (corvee) system was established during the reign of Nongda Lairen Pakhangba.

Some scholars asset that under the administration of Nongda Lairen Pakhangba, his capital was split into four divisions, or panas: Ahallup; Naharup; Laipham; and Khabam. Others suggest that it is the interpolation, by stating that pana came into existence much later, during the era of King Khagemba.

== Artistic and cultural developments ==
When Nongda Lairen Pakhangba and his queen consort Laishna were crowned in 33 AD, the ritual song Ougri was sung. The singing of Ougri can supposedly bring either prosperity or ruination to the civilization. It became customary to recite Ougri during the coronation of every Meitei king. These recitations of the verses, during the royal coronation of Nongda Lairen Pakhangba in 33 AD, were recorded in the ancient text, Laisrapham.

The Mera Hou Chongba is thought to have been be introduced by Nongda Lairen Pakhangba. It is a festival in which dignitaries from all the ethnic groups assembled together in the Kangla. It is annually celebrated on the 10th day of the Meitei lunar month of Mera (October–November).

During the era of Nongda Lairen Pakhangba, a court singer named Leinung Tharuk Asheiba initiated the use of the Pena, a traditional musical instrument.

The Hiyang Tannaba (Meitei: ꯍꯤꯌꯥꯡ ꯇꯥꯟꯅꯕ, lit. 'boat race') festival has been celebrated since the time of Nongda Lairen Pakhangba.

== Institutions of medical care ==
During the reign of Nongda Lairen Pakhangba, his younger sister Panthoibi (Note: The younger sister of Nongda Lairen Pakhangba is eponymous with Meitei goddess Panthoibi.), established the ametpa loishang, or office of the masseurs to diagnose and treat diseases (especially boils, abscesses, ulcers). Metpi attended mothers in labour. Metpi laibi were responsible for the treatment of diseases for the Queen and other imperial consorts. They accompanied the king wherever he went.

== Death or dethronement ==
Though almost all the scholars have a consensus on the year of the coronation of King Nongda Lairen Pakhangba as AD 33, regarding the year of the end of his reign, which may be either due to his death or due to being abdicated, is still disputed.

Some traditional sources claim that he ruled from 33-153 or 154AD. According to Surjit Mukherji, Nongda Lairen Pakhangba ruled for 21 years, from 33 AD to 54 AD. According to Anuradha Dutta and Ratna Bhuyan, Nongda Lairen Pakhangba was murdered and his queen Laisana saved their son.

== Deification ==
=== In traditional Meitei religion ===
In Meitei folklore, Nongda Lairen Pakhangba is considered a deified ancestor. Some scholars believe that people of later generations wove mythological stories around him. However, some suggest that he was a god living amongst humans.

According to superstitious people, Pakhangba was a demigod, appearing divine during the day and human at night. With this, the legend of Meitei kings' divine origin was born. The identity of the historical king Pakhangba was mingled with that of the dragon god Pakhangba of ancient Meitei mythology and religion.

=== In Hinduism ===
With the influence of Hinduism, new mythological tales tainted the identity of King Pakhangba. According to one Hindu tale, Pakhangba was born to Enoog Howba Chonoo, the wife of Babruvahana. According to another, he was the son of Sooprabahoo, son of Babruvahana, son of Arjuna, thereby drawing relationship with the characters in the Mahabharata.

In the 18th century AD, the Vijay Panchali (also called "Bijoy Panchali"), composed by Shantidas Goswami, a Hindu missionary, attempting to erase the history and the culture of Manipur, claiming the land of northeast India's Manipur to be the Manipur of the Mahabharata and Babruvahana to be the father of King Nongda Lairen Pakhangba, identifying him as Yavistha.

== In contemporary art and culture ==
In the Kangla of Imphal, there is an annual Nongda Lairen Pakhangba flag-hoisting ceremony, organised by Nahanong Kanglei Laining Liklam (NKLL). Ceremonies are performed and the Salai Taret Huiyen Lalong Thang-Ta Lup, giving guard of honour, hoists the flag of Nongda Lairen Pakhangba. The ceremony is performed as a way of preserving and promoting the indigenous art and culture of Kangleipak.

== See also ==
- Leishemba Sanajaoba
- Meitei inscriptions
- Meitei literature
  - Numit Kappa
  - The Tales of Kanglei Throne

== Sources ==
- Kala Meitei, Pukhrambam. Pakhangba (in Manipuri). India: Digital Library of India.
- Singh, Lairenmayum Ibungohal (1969). Cheitharol Kumbaba (in Manipuri). India: Manipuri Sahitya Parishad, Manipur.
- Kullachandra Sharma, B (2010). Cheitharol Kumbabagi Kumbarolsing (in Manipuri). Digital Library of India.
- Tarapot, Phanjoubam (2003). Bleeding Manipur. Har-Anand Publications. p. 92. ISBN 978-81-241-0902-1.
