= The Tales of Kanglei Throne =

Book by Linthoi Chanu

- The illustration of the cover of "The Tales of Kanglei Throne", depicting Meitei Dragon God Pakhangba
- Author: Linthoi Chanu
- Original title: The Tales of Kanglei Throne
- Working title: The Tales of Kanglei Throne
- Language: English
- Subject: Meitei mythology (Manipuri mythology) and History of Manipur
- Genre: Meitei mythology (Manipuri mythology) and History of Manipur
- Set in: Kangleipak (Manipur)
- Published: December 2017
- Publisher: Blue Rose Publisher
- Publication place: India
- Media type: book
- ISBN: 978-93-87538-49-8

The Tales of Kanglei Throne is a book by Linthoi Chanu. It is published by the Blue Rose Publisher in December 2017. It deals with the mythological and historical events of Kangleipak (Manipur) from the prehistoric times up to the seventh century. The Kanglei realm (Kangleipak) (Note: "Kanglei" is an adjective of Kangleipak.), an antique name of Manipur, emerged as a well established kingdom in the year 33 C.E. Two historical personalities, "Chingkhong Poireiton" and "Nongda Lairen Pakhangba" founded the civilization of Ancient Kangleipak, whose main feature was the ideological system of kingship and royalty, having Nongda Lairen Pakhangba as the first king to sit on the throne of Kangleipak (lit. Kanglei realm).

== Background ==
Linthoi Chanu's The Tales of Kanglei Throne has stories which are from the following ancient texts:

Text	Description
Cheitharol Kumbaba	A Meitei royal chronicle about the chronology of the rulers of Kangleipak (Manipur), starting with Nongda Lairen Pakhangba as the first king.
Ningthourol Lambuba	Another Meitei royal chronicle about the genealogical lines and activities of every rulers of Kangleipak (Manipur).
Poireiton Khunthok	An account about the migration of Poireiton, under the instruction of Thongaren (Old Manipuri: Thongalen), the King of the land of the death.
Leithak Leikharol	An account about the legends, tradition and some historical accounts on cosmogony, origin of the Meiteis and their seven clans in Kangleipak (Manipur).
Pakhangba Phambal & Pakhangba Nongkarol	An account about the coronation and the demise of Meitei king Nongda Lairen Pakhangba
Panthoibi Khongul	An account about the romantic adventure of Meitei goddess Panthoibi
Chada Laihui	An account of the Meitei queens and their blood relation with the rulers.
Naothingkhong Phambal Kaba	An account of the coronation of Meitei prince Naothingkhong
Moirang Ningthourol Lambuba	An account of the Moirang royalties

== Contents ==
The Tales of Kanglei Throne contains 4 chapters.

Chapter name	Description
"Khamnung, the Under World"	About the underworld kingdom (Meitei: Khamnung) ruled by King Thongalen, who sent his younger brother, Lord Poireiton (Poireitol) along with his concubine, Lady Lainaotabi, to the upper world (human world), for exploration.
"The Serpent King"	About Nongda Lairen Pakhangba ascending the throne of the Kanglei realm and his administration
"The Colossal Bird"	About the gigantic bird attacking the Kanglei realm and its end of life at the hands of two Meitei princes, namely Yoimongba and Taothingmang, the sons of King Khuyoi Tompok
"The Exiled Prince"	About the life of Meitei prince Naothingkhong, the son of King Ura Konthouba, starting from the exile up to his coronation and kingly life

== See also ==
- And That Is Why . . . Manipuri Myths Retold
