= And That Is Why... Manipuri Myths Retold =

- Author: L. Somi Roy
- Original title: And That Is Why... Manipuri Myths Retold
- Illustrator: Sapha Yumnam
- Cover artist: Sapha Yumnam
- Language: English
- Genre: Meitei mythology (Manipuri mythology)
- Set in: Meitei mythology (Manipuri mythology)
- Published: 21 June 2021
- Publisher: Penguin Random House
- Publication date: 21 June 2021
- Publication place: India
- English publication date: 21 June 2021
- Media type: Kindle and Paperback
- Pages: 93
- ISBN: 9780143452393

And That Is Why... Manipuri Myths Retold is a children's book based on 12 stories from the Meitei mythology of Manipur, written by L. Somi Roy and published by Penguin Random House India. It was launched by Member of Parliament Rajya Sabha and titular King of Manipur Leishemba Sanajaoba at the palace compound, Imphal on 21 June 2021. The stories are adaptations of tales found in the puyas (Meitei language manuscripts).

== Background ==
L. Somi Roy was introduced to the ancient Meitei manuscripts by the late scholar Ningthoukhongjam Khelchandra. Roy was assisted by Thokchom Thouyangba Meitei, a scholar of ancient manuscripts, illustrator Sapha Yumnam, and Manipuri historian Wangam Somorjit. The author revisited the ancient mythological tales of the Meitei people, from a time before the arrival of Hinduism in Manipur. Sapha Yumnam created the illustrations using a similar red- and brown- based colour palette with little blue or black, similar to that found in the manuscripts.

According to the author, first time Manipuri mythology being presented to the outside world and so he took extra care researching manuscripts, later writing, and oral traditions. In an interview with "The Indian Express", he said:

"We have high culture in dance and music, and even sports, but not much of a visual tradition. It is these rare manuscripts that make up the heritage of the Meitei community — and hence, need to be preserved as far as possible."

== Works ==
The book contains 12 stories about mythical creatures, heroes, gods and goddesses from Meitei mythology.

- And that is why Man is Creative and can Think: the story of the creation of woman before man.
- And that is why Man Gets Wrinkles and a Stoop in his Old Age: a story about the lifespan of man being one hundred years.
- And that is why the Deer Does not Eat Rice: the story of goddess Phouoibi, daughter of the sky God Soraren.
- And that Is why the Cat Buries its Poop: the story of a tiger and his aunt, a cat.
- And that is why the Duck does not Brood her own Eggs: a story about kindness.
- And that is why the Weavers of Khurkhul Make Silk: the story of Khurkhul silk making an imprint on Manipur.
- And that is why a Magic Bamboo Grows on Karang Island: the story of the slaying of the dragon Poubi Lai of Loktak Lake.
- And that is why the Pied Cuckoo Drinks Only Rainwater: a story of community inclusiveness and also of a stubborn foreign pied cuckoo.
- And that is why the Manipuri Pony is Sacred: the story of Samadon, a mythical flying horse.
- And that is why a Doll is Worshipped in Kakching Village: a story of a little girl and her beloved doll.
- And that is why the Fire in the Village of Andro Never Goes Out: the story of the connection between Manipur and foreign kingdoms like Shan.
- And that is why Manipur is the Birthplace of Polo: the story of the birth of polo, and stories about the Goddess Konthoujam Tampha Lairembi and the adventures of her son, Khoriphaba.

== See also ==
- The Tales of Kanglei Throne
- Boro Saheb Ongbi Sanatombi
