= Khongbu Konthouba =

Monarch of Khuman dynasty

- Khuman Ningthou
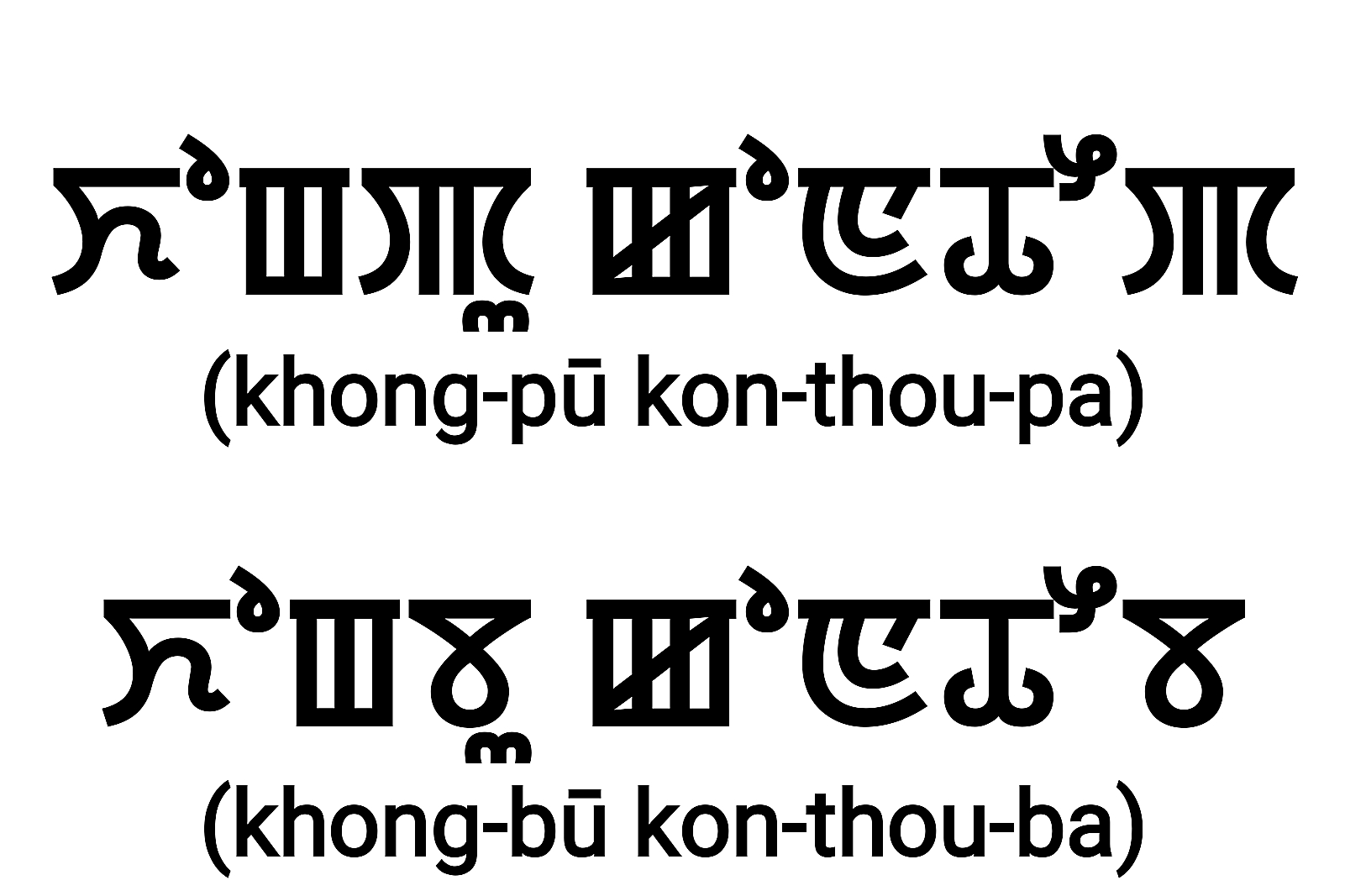
- Monarch: 1150 CE – 1160 CE
- Predecessor: Thingkol Hanba
- Successor: Sekpu Kainou Chingsomba
- Born: Khongpu Konthoupa
- House: Khuman dynasty
- Religion: Sanamahism
- Occupation: Monarch

Khongbu Konthouba (Old Manipuri: ꯈꯣꯡꯄꯨ ꯀꯣꯟꯊꯧꯄ, romanised: Khongpu Konthoupa) was a monarch of the Khuman dynasty who ruled from 1150 CE to 1160 CE.

He was a contemporary of Atom Yoiremba, a ruler of the Ningthouja dynasty, who reigned from 1150 CE to 1163 CE.
