= Loitongba =

- Meitei Ningthou
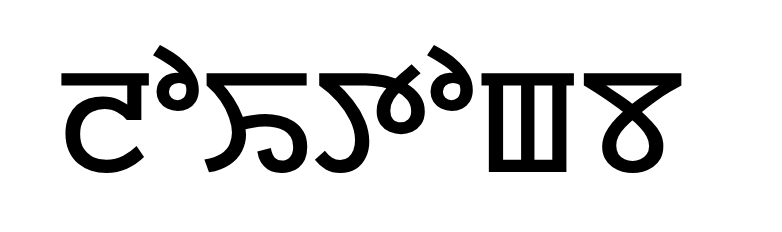
- "Loitongba" in Meitei Mayek.
- Monarchy: 1122 CE - 1149 CE
- Coronation: 1122 CE
- Predecessor: Loiyumba
- Successor: Atom Yoiremba
- Issue: Atom Yoiremba, Hemtou Iwanthaba
Names
- Meidingu Loitongba
Era name and dates
- Medieval Manipur: 1122 CE – 1149 CE (2220 MF – 2247 MF)
- House: Ningthouja dynasty
- Father: Loiyumba
- Mother: Sum-Leima
- Religion: Sanamahism
- Occupation: Monarch of Kangleipak Kingdom

Meidingu Loitongba (Old Manipuri: Meitingu Loitongpa) was a Meitei king of the Ningthouja dynasty of Medieval Manipur from 1122 CE to 1149 CE. He succeeded his father Loiyumba in 1122 CE. He was inside his mother's womb when his father ascended the throne in 1073 CE.

He is also a player of Meitei traditional games and is often called a religious lover of the game Kang Sannaba. Other sources say that he is the one who invented the game, while others say that he was a talented player who popularised the game at his period.

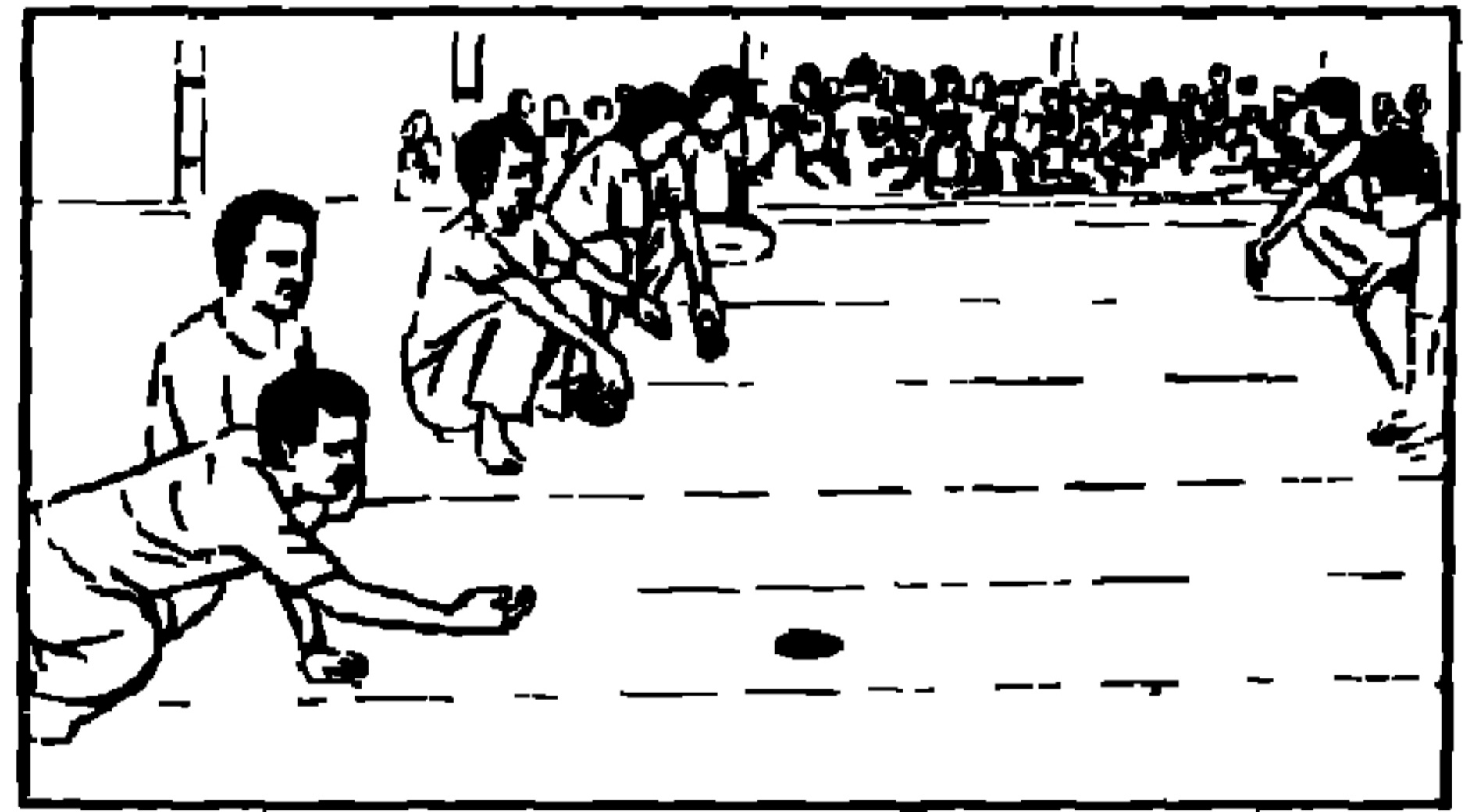
Kang Sannaba
