= Yumbanlol copper plate inscriptions =

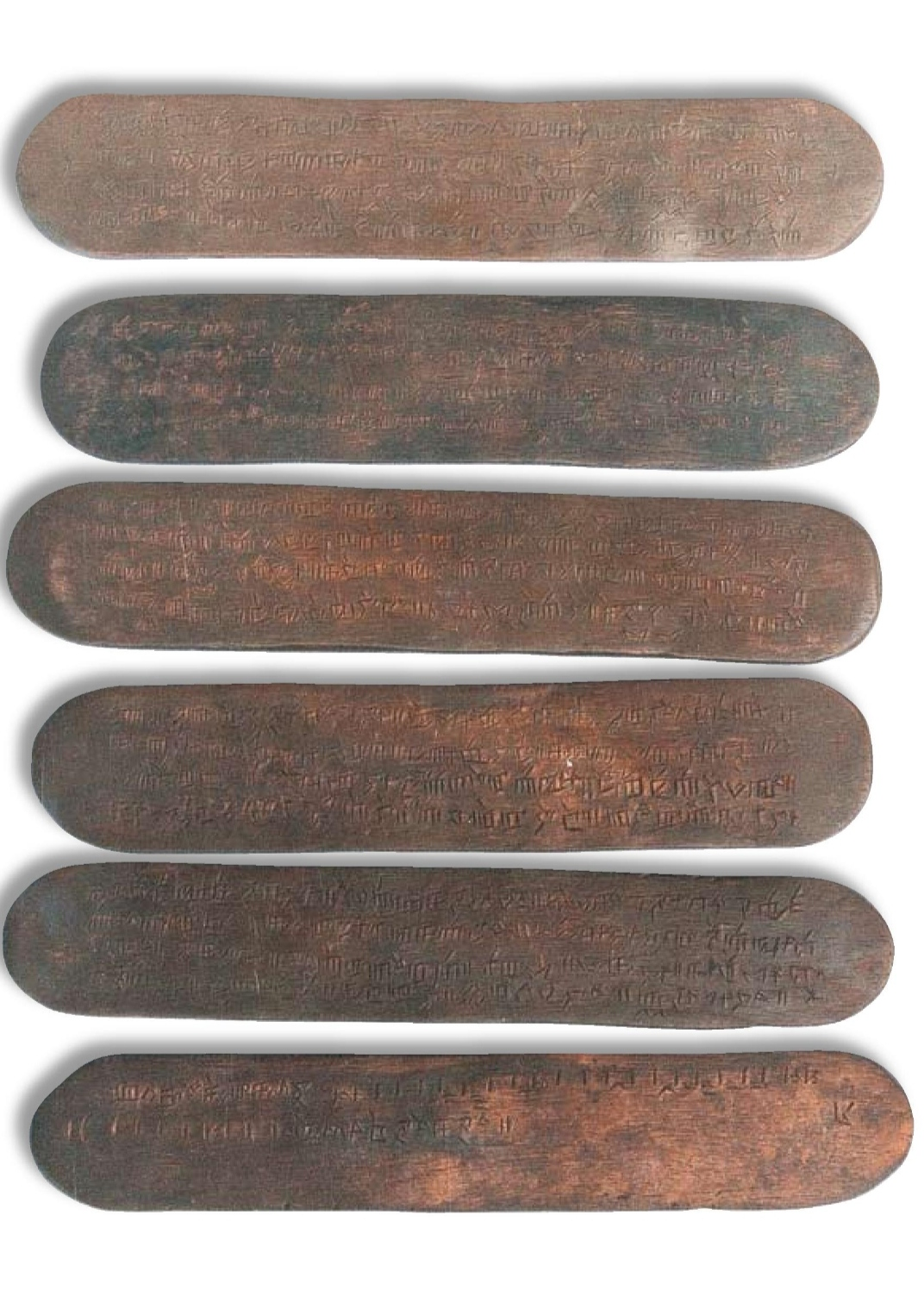
Yumbanlol (Yumpanlol) - a 6th-century Classical Meitei language copper manuscript text - in Meetei script

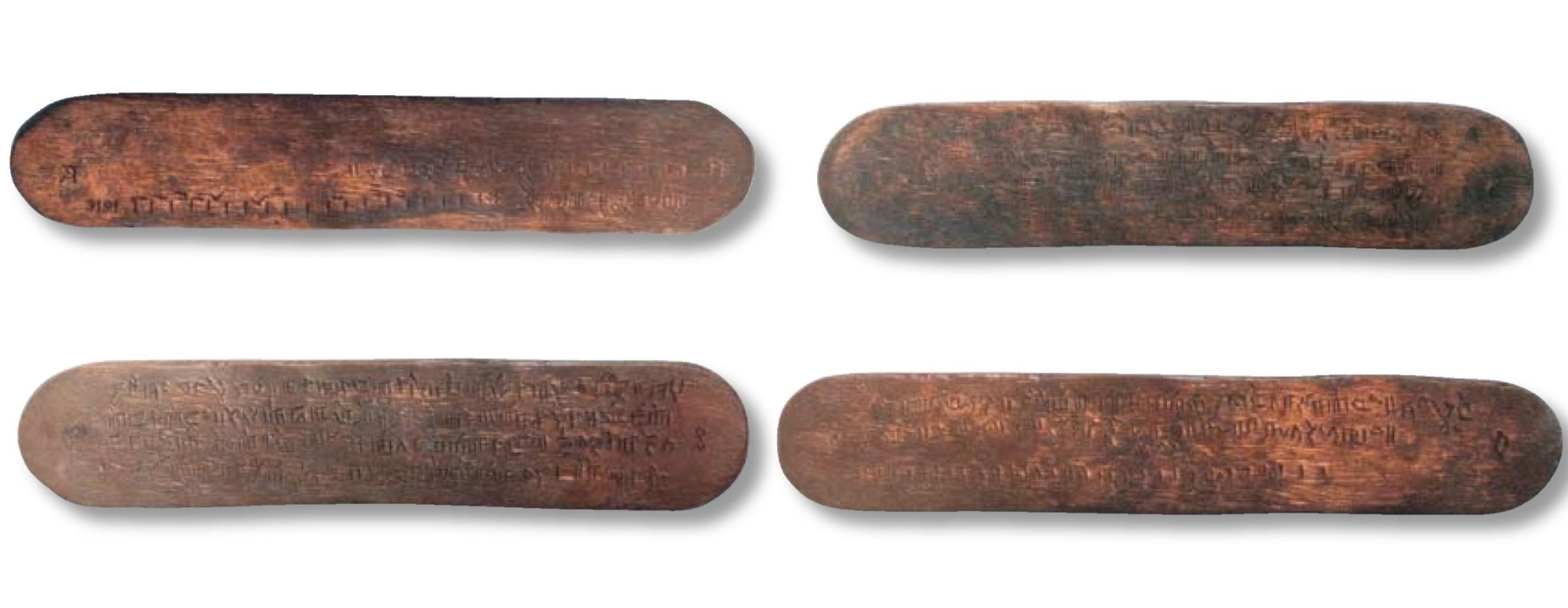
4 folios of the Yumbanlol (Yumpanlol) - 6th century Classical Meitei language copper manuscript text - in Meetei script

The Yumbanlol (also spelled Yumpanlol, Yumbanlon, Yumballol, Yumballon, Yumbalol, or Yumbalon) is a rare 6th-century Classical Meitei language manuscript inscribed on copper plates. It is one of the earliest known literary texts from the ancient Kangleipak (present-day Manipur, India), and is written in the traditional Meetei Mayek script.

== Description ==
The Yumbanlol consists of six copper folios, each measuring 13.5 cm x 2.5 cm x 0.5 cm. The manuscript is a didactic and instructional text, focusing on themes of sensuality, relationships between husbands and wives, and household management. It is believed to reflect the moral and social codes of the early Meitei society.

The text is both literary and prescriptive, offering guidance on family life and domestic duties within the cultural context of early Kangleipak civilization.

== Historical context ==
The manuscript is dated to the period between 568 and 658 CE, making it one of the oldest surviving Meitei literary works. It was originally composed during the early historical period of Manipur, when the Meitei script and Classical Meitei language were already in use for official and cultural purposes.

== Ownership and preservation ==
The Yumbanlol was originally preserved by the royal family of Kangleipak, and later came into the custody of royal scholars. Due to its exclusive content and cultural importance, access to the manuscript was historically restricted to members of the royal household and their appointed scholars.

In modern times, the manuscript was donated to the Manipur State Archives in Imphal by Bobby Wahengbam, a descendant of the royal lineage that held the manuscript.

== Importance ==
The Yumbanlol manuscript is considered a valuable historical and literary source for understanding the early domestic ethics, gender relations, and cultural practices of ancient Manipur. It also holds significance as a rare surviving example of early copper-plate Meitei texts, demonstrating the use of Meetei Mayek in administrative and literary contexts during the 6th and 7th centuries.

== See also ==
- Laiphangba
- Meitei currency
- Ura Konthouba
