= Khui Ningomba =

Ruler of Ancient Manipur

- Monarchy: 363 AD-378 AD (1761 MF-1776 MF)
- Coronation: 363 AD (1761 MF)
- Predecessor: Taothingmang
- Successor: Pengsiba
Names
- Ningthou Khui Ningompa
Era name and dates
- Ancient Manipur: 363 AD-378 AD (1761 MF-1776 MF)
- Royalty: Ningthouja dynasty
- Religion: Meiteism of Sanamahism
- Occupation: Ruler of Ancient Manipur (Antique Kangleipak)

Khui Ningomba (Old Manipuri: Ningthou Khui Ningompa) was a ruler of Ancient Manipur (Antique Kangleipak). He was the successor of Emperor Taothingmang.

It was during his reign that the Manipuri traders reached out on horseback to upper Burma and China. He is one of the nine kings associated with the design of a historic flag.

Besides the Cheitharol Kumbaba, he is mentioned in the Ningthourol Lambuba.
