= Yaraba =

Ruler of Ancient Manipur

- Meidingu
- Reign: 799 CE – 821 CE
- Predecessor: Keirencha
- Successor: Ayangba
- Born: Kangleipak
- Died: 821 CE; Kangleipak
- Issue: Ayangba
Era name and dates
- Ancient Kangleipak: 33 CE – 1110 CE
Regnal name
- Meidingu Yaraba
- House: Ningthouja dynasty
- Father: Keirencha
- Religion: Sanamahism
- Occupation: King of the Ningthouja dynasty

Yaraba was a Meitei king of the Ningthouja dynasty of Ancient Kangleipak (early Manipur). He ruled from 799 CE to 821 CE. He was the son and successor of the Meitei King Keirencha. Yaraba was an expert marksman and archer, and was liked by the people of the kingdom.
