= Koirengba =

Koirengba (Old Manipuri: Koilengpa)
- Ningthou
- Born: Kangleipak
- Died: Kangleipak
- Burial: Kangleipak
- Dynasty: Ningthouja dynasty
- Occupation: monarch

Koirengba (Meitei: ꯀꯣꯢꯔꯦꯡꯕ, Old Manipuri: ꯀꯣꯢꯂꯦꯡꯄ, romanized: koilengpa) was a Meitei king of the Ningthouja dynasty who ruled from 1507 CE to 1511 CE. He ascended the throne of Kangleipak when he was 20 years old.

He was a son of Senbi Kiyamba and Leishangthem Chanu.

== See also ==
- List of Meitei royals
- Manipur (princely state)
