= Loiyumpa Silyel =

Ancient Meitei Constitution

Loiyumpa Silyel (Modern Meitei: "Loiyumpa Sinyen")
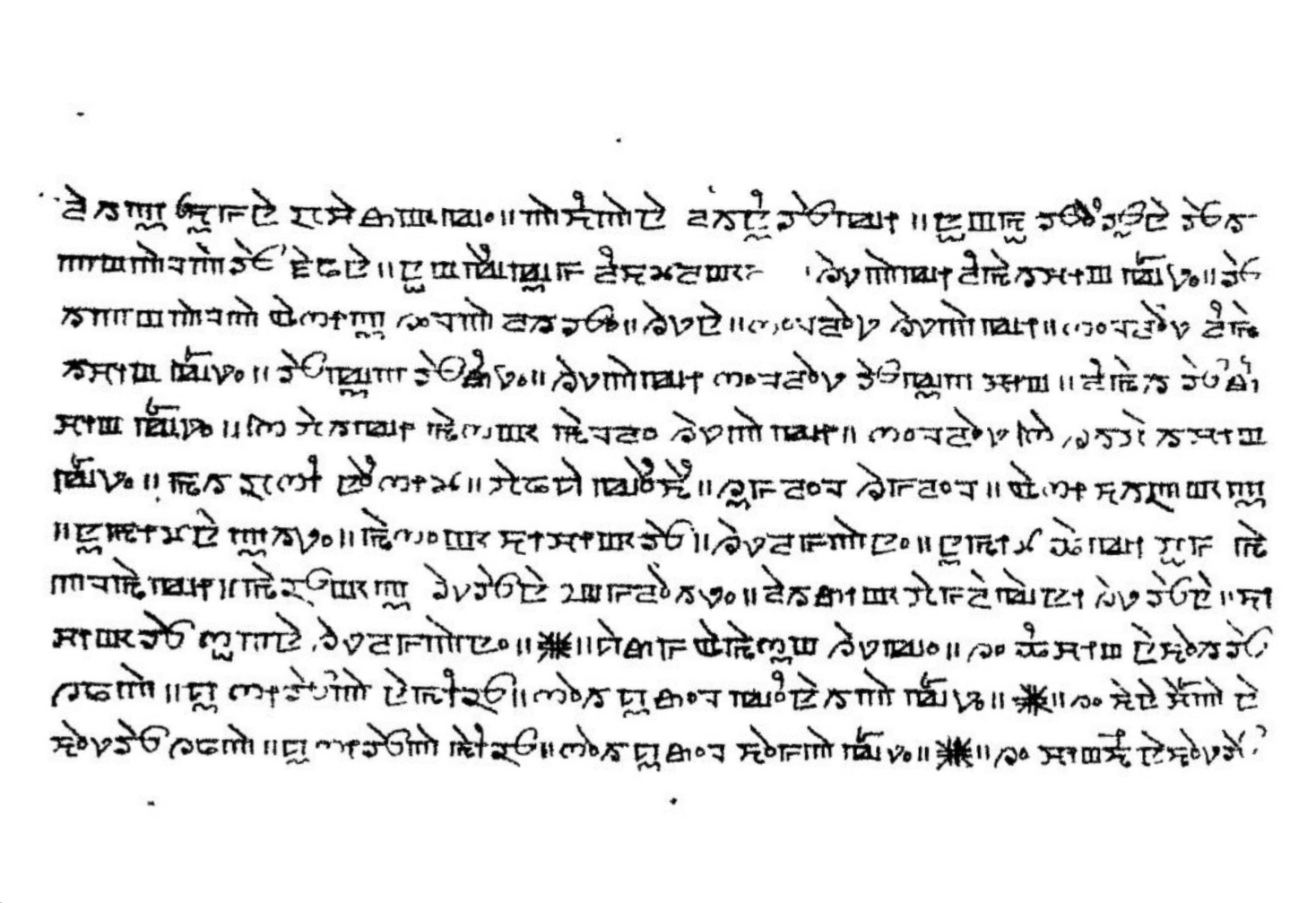
- First page of the "Loiyumpa Silyel", stored in the Manipur University Library, digitalised by the Digital Library of India
- Language: ancient Meitei language (old Manipuri language)
- Subjects: law, rules and regulations, social system
- Genre: Constitution
- Published: 1110 CE
- Publisher: King Loiyumba (Ancient Meitei: Loiyumpa)
- Publication place: Ancient Kangleipak - Medieval Kangleipak
- It is an 11th-12th century written constitution of the Ancient Kangleipak (early Manipur).

The Loīyumpā/Loiyumba/Loyumpa/Loyumbā/Loiyamba Silyel/Sinyen/Shilyel/Shinyen was the first written constitution of the Meitei people's kingdom of Kangleipak (now in Manipur, India), finalized in 1110 or 1111 CE under King Loiyumba, based on a 429 CE draft by King Naophangba. Besides some amendments, including expansions by later kings Senbi Kiyamba, Khagemba, Gharib Niwaz, Bhagya Chandra, and Chourajit Singh, it remained in force until 1891 CE. This is referenced in the Cheitharol Kumbaba. It was replaced by the Manipur State Constitution Act 1947, which was functional until Manipur was merged into Republic of India on October 15, 1949.

It includes the accounts of the distribution of the duties to the subjects of the king. Its rules and regulations remains to be an authoritative work in the Meitei social system till the present day Manipur. Much of its content is about customs and traditions, particularly at various events.

A translation into English by Dr. Naorem Sanajaoba, distributed by the Revolutionary People's Front, has the following sections:

- I. PROLOGUE
- II. INVOCATION OF GOD
- III. SURNAME-WISE OBLIGATION OF THE ‘MAIBAS’
- IV. DUTY OF THE TAMPAK MAIBA (PEOPLES PRIEST)
- V. PANA (TERRITORIAL) CLASSIFICATION
- VI. STATE DUTY OF THE CROWN
- VII. ROYAL DECORUM (FOR THE NOBILITY) DOLLAI SAGOLTONGBA
- VIII. RULES REGARDING COSTUMES
- IX. RULES FOR REWARDS
- X. ADMINISTRATION OF JUSTICE
- XI. CONSCIENCE KEEPER OF THE NATION

== See also ==
- Cyrus the Great
- Hammurabi
- Magna Carta
