= Pengsiba =

- Monarchy: 378 AD-393 AD (1766 MF-1791 MF)
- Coronation: 378 AD (1766 MF)
- Predecessor: Khui Ningomba
- Successor: Kaokhangba
Names
- Meitingu Pengshipa
Era name and dates
- Ancient Manipur: 378 AD-393 AD (1766 MF-1791 MF)
- Father: Khui Ningomba
- Religion: Meiteism of Sanamahism
- Occupation: Ruler of Ancient Manipur (Antique Kangleipak)

Pengsiba (Old Manipuri: Pengsipa) or Pengshiba (Old Manipuri: Pengshipa) was a ruler of ancient Manipur (Antique Kangleipak). He was a successor of Khui Ningomba and the predecessor of Kaokhangba. In the 4th century AD, during the reign of his era, Manipuri traders reached out on horseback to upper Burma and China. He is one of the nine kings who are associated with the design of a historic flag.

== Other books ==
- Joychandra Singh, L. (1995). The Lost Kingdom: Royal Chronicle of Manipur.
- Shimmi, Yanao Lungharnao Roland (1988). Comparative History of the Nagas, from Ancient Period till 1826. ISBN 9788121002103.
- Singh, Wahengbam Ibohal (1986). The History of Manipur: An early period.
