= Ougri =

Ougri Hangel or Ougri Hangen is a Meitei cultural ritual song and dance. It is part of the Meitei folklore and related to the mythology of creation in Meitei culture. It is often sung in the conclusion of the Lai Haraoba festival. It is performed by a group of performers forming a circle, which is never to be snapped till the end of the ritual. The performers repeat an alteration of few lines.

== Mythology ==
As per Meitei culture, the origin of the dance can be traced to the creation myth of the universe. Sanamahi and Pakhangba (also identified as Kuptreng and Sentreng) were the sons of the creator of the universe Sidaba Mapu (Salailel) and his consort Leimarel Sidabi. Sidaba Mapu gave his two sons a task to determine his successor. He announced that whoever completed a circumambulation of the world first would inherit his throne. While Sanamahi went out to complete the task, Leimarel Sidabi advised her younger son to go around the throne of Sidaba Mapu seven times, to which he complied. He returned to Sidaba Mapu, who asked him as to whether he had completed the task. Pakhangba narrated his mother's advice, which was accepted by Sidaba Mapu as going around the throne of the creator would be equal to going around the world.

Pakhangba inherited the throne from his father without much effort. When Sanamahi returned to the starting point at Lamdaipung after going around the world, he was furious that Pakhangba took the throne easily. Sanamahi got ready to fight with his brother for the throne. Fearing his brother, Pakhangba sought the help of the 12 nymphs created by Sidaba Mapu. The nymphs took him under their protection, and encircled him. While encircling him, they began dancing in a circular fashion chanting in chorus:

Kekrek Ket Mo Mo Yangoi
Syamba Syao Syao

Woe to traveller! Your voice is harsh!
Peace! Peace! Peace!

Thus, Pakhangba was hidden from Sanamahi. This practice gave rise to Ougri. When Sanamahi intended to destroy the world in anger, Sidaba Mapu pacified him. He proclaimed that the brothers would rule alternatively for 12 months at a time. While one of the brothers occupied the throne, the other went with his mother Leimarel Sidabi to visit the Meitei households.

According to the manuscript Laisra Pham, a treatise on administration and social conduct, Ougri is referred to as being sung at the coronation of Nongda Lairen Pakhangba in 33 CE. Pakhangba is considered to be the Meitei monarch and founder of Manipur. Naothingkhong Phambal Kaba mentions it as being an important part of the Meitei lore, and supposedly taught by the king Naothingkhong to the prince, which according to the chronicle Cheitharol Kumbaba, took place just prior to 663 CE.

== Practice ==
An equal number of men or women perform the ritual. They form a circle and hold a rope tied with bells at its ends. The performers step in and out of the circle in an arrangement. The male singers recite traditional ritual songs in chorus. These songs are composed to be sang on specific tune and arrangement, and handed down across generations. The lines of the first part of the song comprise six syllables each and those in the second part comprise eight syllables. The ritual is performed in the presence of a maibi, who sings a lengthy song during the performance. The song begins with Ougri kollo meaning "gather in the rope" instructing the performers to hold the rope firmly with feet in position in the circle. The performers should never break the chain or snap out of the circle. The chant is believed to invoke incantatory powers, and breaking the circle or altering the lines is believed to bring bad luck to the people and the village.

== Occasion ==
The ritual is usually performed during the Lai Haraoba festival. The ritual is performed to ensure the welfare of the people and to bring prosperity. It is also regarded as the song of thanksgiving to the almighty god Sidaba Mapu. The ritual is usually followed by other practices which all relate to the mythology of creation the universe and other beings in Meitei culture. In the past, rulers performed the ritual by themselves singing it with an accompanying dance on occasion of new conquests or coronation. It was also performed as a war songs earlier.

== Areas of practice ==
According to the Meitei text Leithak Leikharole, Ougri Hangel is considered as the traditional dance of Manipur.
