= Ningthoucheng =

Ruler of Ancient Manipur

- Meidingu

King of the Ningthouja dynasty
- Reign: 910 AD - 949 AD
- Predecessor: Ayangba
- Successor: Chenglei Ipan Lanthaba
- Issue: Chenglei Ipan Lanthaba
- House: Ningthouja dynasty
- Father: Ayangba
- Religion: Sanamahism

Ningthoucheng was a Meitei king of the Ningthouja dynasty who ruled from 910 AD to 949 AD. He was the son and successor of King Ayangba. He also launched a successful raid on Houkei.

He was succeeded on the throne by his son Chenglei Ipan Lanthaba.
