= Iwanthaba =

Hemtou Iwanthaba
- Meitei Ningthou
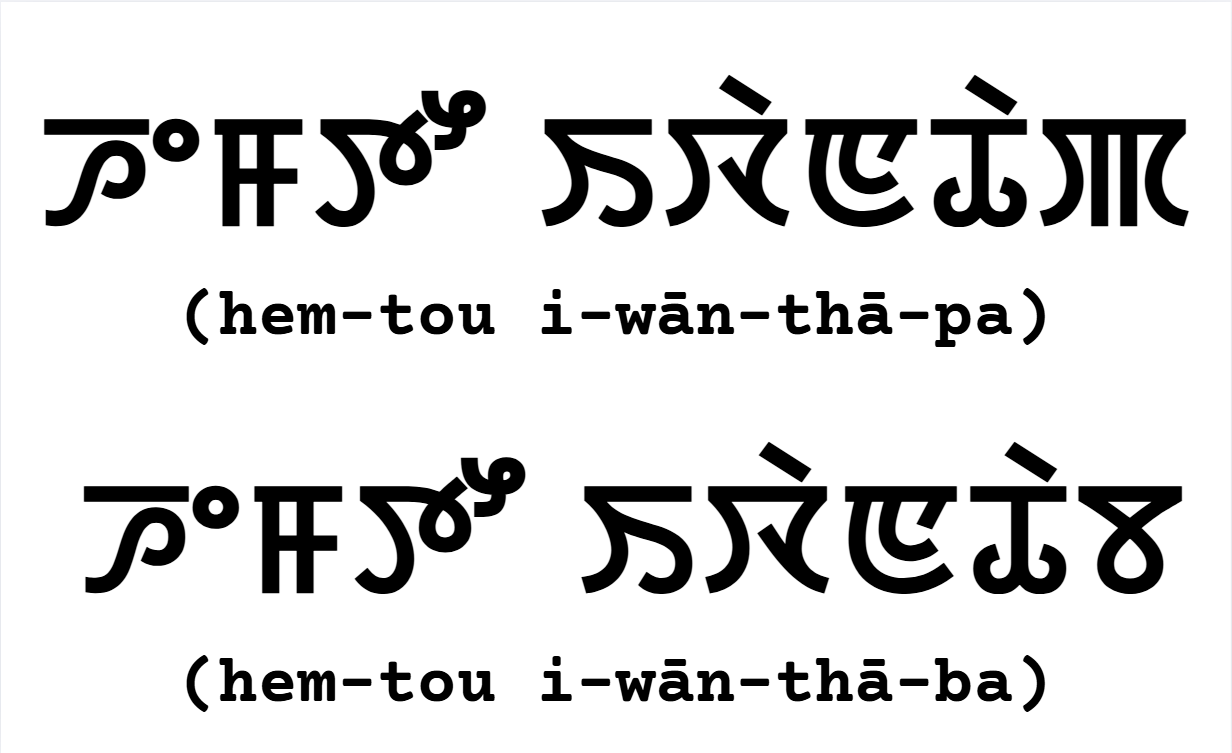
- "Hemtou Iwanthapa" (Ancient Meitei name) and "Hemtou Iwanthaba" (Modern Meitei name)
- Monarchy: 1162 CE - 1194 CE
- Predecessor: Atom Yoiremba
- Successor: Thawanthaba
- Spouse: Linphuron Khuroi Ngambi, Angam Chanu Hemkhu Ngambi
- Issue: Thawanthaba
- House: Ningthouja dynasty
- Father: Loitongba
- Mother: Sangleima
- Religion: Sanamahism
- Occupation: Monarch of the Ningthouja dynasty

Meidingu Hemtou Iwanthaba or mononymously Iwanthaba (Old Manipuri: ꯢꯋꯥꯟꯊꯥꯄꯥ, romanized: Iwanthapa) was a king of the Ningthouja dynasty of Medieval Manipur who ruled from 1162 CE to 1194 CE. He became the king after he banished his elder brother Atom Yoiremba for trying to introduce primogeniture in the kingdom.

During his reign, the Queen of the Khumans was killed, so all the Khumans were angry and attacked the Meitei kingdom but were defeated. In the battle, about thirty people were captured by the Meiteis with some who fled their homes and some who were killed.
