= Loiyumba =

King of Manipur from 1074 to 1122

Loiyumba (Old Manipuri: Loiyumpa)
- Ningthou

King of Manipur
- Reign: 1074–1122
- Coronation: 1074
- Investiture: ꯃꯤꯇꯩ ꯂꯣꯟ
- Predecessor: Irengba
- Successor: Loitongba
- Born: Kangleipak kingdom
- House: Ningthouja dynasty
- Religion: Meitei religion (Sanamahism)
- Occupation: monarch

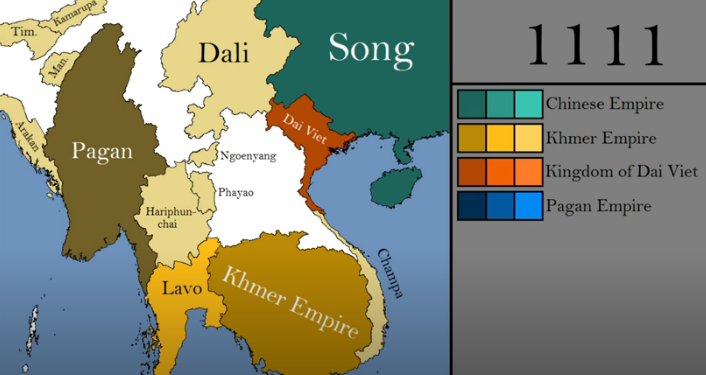
The map of Southeast Asia during the era of King Loiyumpa. In the map, "Man." denotes Kangleipak (Manipur kingdom).

King Loiyumba (Old Manipuri: ꯂꯣꯢꯌꯨꯝꯄ, romanized: loi-yūm-pa or loī-yūm-pa), also known as Meidingu Loiyumpa, was a Meitei monarch and a ruler of Kangleipak kingdom. He was the first king to order a written constitution in the 11-12th century CE which is known as the Loiyumpa Silyel (Loiyumba Sinyen).

Roso Phishahanba was appointed the head of weaving loisang (department) during the time of Meidingu Loiyumba. The Puya "Loiyumpa Silyen" or "Loiyumba Shinyen" records the names of royal weavers such as Naotam Phishapa, Ngangti Phishapa, Yangnu Phishapa, Heisu Naha Phishapa and more.

== Contributions ==
King Loiyumba reforms the administrative system. He reform/introduced Lanlup and decentralized his kingdom into six panas.

The six panas are i. Angom Lup/Luplen Lup (chief Lup)

ii. Nongmai Lup/Thoucha Lup

iii. Aakong Lup/Kongcha Lup

iv. Khurai Lup/Lupkhupa Lup

v. Chingcha Lup

vi. Khaicha Lup

== Military expeditions ==
He defeated the Sektas (Chakpa people). He collect tribute from the people of Haoku and Leihou.

According to the court chronicles, the singing of Ougri started from his time.
