= Lamkiyamba =

Meidingu Lamkiyamba
- Meitei Monarch of the Ningthouja dynasty
- Reign: 1512–1523 CE
- Predecessor: Koiremba
- Successor: Meidingu Nonginphaba
- Born: 1485 CE
- Died: 1523 CE
- Spouse: Changning Phabi, Chaklai Tangkhombi
- Issue: Nonginphaba, Kabomba
- House: Ningthouja dynasty
- Father: Senbi Kiyamba

Meidingu Lamkiyamba (born 1485 CE – died 1523 CE), also known as Lamkhyamba, Lamkyamba was a king of the Ningthouja dynasty of the Kingdom of Manipur. He ruled from 1512 to 1523 CE. He was the first son of Meidingu Senbi Kiyamba and the elder brother of Meidingu Koiremba. He was born in 1485 CE during the reign of his father.

Lamkiyamba ascended the throne at the age of 27, following the death of his younger brother. He ruled for eleven years.

== Events during his reign ==
In 1515 CE, prices of resources were very high. In the same year, the kingdom was victorious over Leitang, and Numit Thara was captured in battle. Meidingu Lamkiyamba participated in a boat race and went out to witness ceremonial events.

In 1519 CE, they achieved victory over Aarai Champra and captured Senlik in battle. Lamkiyamba also dedicated a great palace.

In 1520 CE, an epidemic of smallpox started in the kingdom.

In 1522 CE, they were victorious over Sikhong and captured Aasou. Lamkiyamba inaugurated the site of Kangla.

In 1523 CE, they won battles against Sairem and captured Waira Liroupa and Huiyen Lamchoupa. A person responsible for road construction, identified by a white headdress, was permitted to wear the strap of the chumpun huiroi. That same year, Meitei Leima Serembi was born.

Meidingu Lamkiyamba died in 1523 CE at the age of 38.

== Family ==
He had two sons:

- Nonginphaba
- Kabomba

Kabomba was the half-brother of Nonginphaba and the son of Meitei Leima Chaklai Tangkhombi.
