= Kang Shanaba =

Traditional Meitei sport of Manipur, India

Kang Sannaba / Kang Shanaba
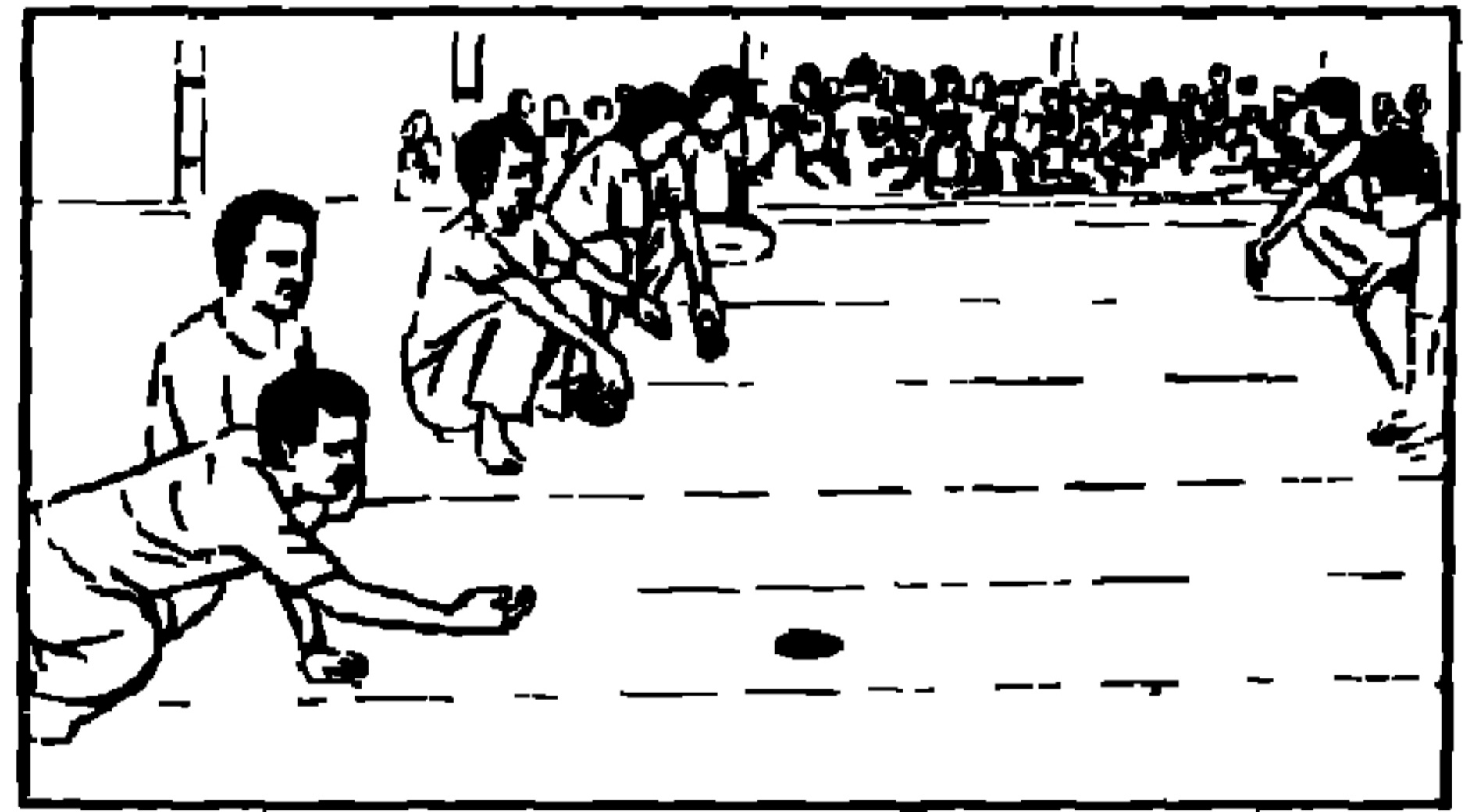
- Traditional Kang used in the game
- Nicknames: Game of Kang; Playing the Kang
- First played: Ancient times

Characteristics
- Contact: No
- Team members: 7 players per side
- Equipment: Kang (round or oval seed), Chekphei, Lamtha
- Venue: Earthen floors of traditional houses and temple courtyards

Presence
- Country or region: Manipur, India

Kang Shanaba or Kang Sanaba or Kang Sannaba, literally "playing the kang" or "the game of kang", is an indigenous Meitei game. It is a type of indoor activity that utilizes a rounded or oval object known as a "kang", which is the seed of a creeper, and can be tossed onto the ground. The game is typically enjoyed on the smooth earthen surfaces found in traditional homes and temple courtyards. Regarded as sacred, it is thought that the deities participated in this game, especially during the Meitei lunar new year, known as Cheiraoba (the first day of the Sajibu month), and continuing through the Rath Yatra festival (Kang Chingba).

== Origin ==
=== Mythology ===
The Meitei people believe that Kang was originally played by seven Lainingthous (deities) and seven goddesses known as Leimarens (female deities) to commemorate the creation of the earth and the splendor of the rising Sun and Moon. The term "Kang" is derived from the Manipuri word "Kangba", which means to begin.The game represented the commencement of a new life following the formation of the earth. The Lainingthous and Leimarens competed in seven rounds, with the goddesses emerging victorious in each round.

They utilized a spherical object called Kangkhil, which is a seed from a large climbing plant, during the game. This provided the goddesses with a significant advantage. Feeling disheartened, the gods requested assistance, prompting Pakhangba to create an oval-shaped Kang for the Leimarens.

=== According to the Royal Chronicle ===
As per the Royal Chronicle, the Cheitharon Kumbaba, the game known as Kang Tharo Shanaba, originated during King Loitongba's reign in AD 1122. One day during the festivities of Cheiraoba (the Meitei new year), King Loitongba was strolling through his royal courtyard when he noticed a couple of Kangkhil seeds lying in a corner. He tossed one seed a little way off and then picked up the other seed to try and hit the first one. He continued to attempt to hit the target repeatedly.

This activity turned into an enjoyable game for King Loitongba, who then shared it with his family and others around him. It brought him happiness and captured his interest. He recalled similar indoor games his ancestors had played and decided to name this new method of playing with Kangkhil seeds "Kang Tharo Sanaba".

At the Queen's suggestion, the king permitted women to participate, but stipulated that each women's team must include two male players.

== Players ==
The game of Kang consists of seven players on each side with their position names as:

- Matai Achouba (Taijao),
- Pan-ngakpa
- Chekpheitanba-Yet (Matai Mathang-Yet)
- Langjei
- Chekpheitanba-Oi (Matai Mathang -Oi)
- Lamthatanba (Anompham)
- Matai Khutshi

The Meitei people believe that the court used for Kang symbolizes the journey of life. The seven participants on each team correspond to the seven days of the week. Each team consists of eight Chekphei and seven Lamtha Kangkhils for the seven players, totaling 15 Kangkhuls per team. Collectively, both teams reflect the 30 days of a complete lunar month. This illustrates the progression of days, months, and years within life. Every player represents various daily routines in their unique manner.

To achieve scoring, two Chekpheis are utilized. The first Chekphei signifies "Darkness", while the second represents "Day". As the day commences, each player advances the Lamtha along their path (Kangkhul) in the appropriate direction. If the Kang, a flat implement used in the game, passes the endpoint, it indicates the crossing of life's final phase. The player who accomplishes this is deemed "Dead" or "Shiba" for that round.

When there are two tracks alongside the "Matais", after a strike, the Kang veers to the left; this situation is referred to as "Hanba". If it crosses the final boundary with three tracks in the center, it is also called "Hanba"; otherwise, it is identified as "Handaba".

== Role of Women in Kang ==
Kang play was traditionally participated in by both boys and girls in the past. In these performances, boys typically occupied the outer four positions while the three roles, including Chekphei and Langjei, were taken by women.

Such matches were organized either within the community or during special occasions. However, in 1980, an all-women Kang tournament was held at the temple of Lord Ramji Prabhu in Imphal. This tournament is now held annually and is organized by the All Manipur Women Kang Association, which was founded in 1982.

== Kang Tharo Sannaba for Children ==
Children enjoy playing Uri-kang, thus it came to be known as "Anganggi Kang Tharo Sannaba".

This game can be played on a flat surface with either two players or two teams, but it's also possible to play individually. Two lines are marked around ten feet apart. The game begins with an Urikang positioned on one line, its wider side facing the opposing team if present. The player rolls their Kang toward a designated spot on the ground. As the Kang moves, the player follows along and attempts to hit it with their hand. The rolling Kang is required to stay behind the line, even if it gets very close to the target. The Kang measures about three lums in width (approximately ten khudups) and six lums in length (around twenty khudups), though these dimensions may vary based on available space.Lines referred to as Leeris are indicated with small ropes to define the game's boundaries. The primary lines for this game are the Lamtha Leeris and Kangpha Leeris. Each playing area contains eight Chekphei Kangkhuls and seven Lamtha Kangkhuls, which indicate where the seven players should be positioned.

== Evolution of Kang ==
As time passed, the game underwent changes and enhancements. The term "Kang" originates from Kangkhil, which signifies the seed of a plant known as Kangli. Eventually, the Uri-kang or Kangkhil was substituted with circular pieces crafted from wood for commoners and ivory for nobility.Subsequently, the circular Kang was replaced by a piece shaped like an oval, made from buffalo horns, tortoise shells, and various other materials. Around the year 1851, during the reign of King Chandrakirti, the game was refined to include a designated playing area, established rules, and a team called Kangkhut composed of seven players. The most current iteration involves an egg-shaped piece created from lac and similar substances.

Today, plastic Kang pieces are becoming very popular.

== Organizations ==
In Manipur, there are three groups that organize tournaments and manage the game:

- The All Manipur Kang Association, started in 1952; the All Manipur Kang Control Board, set up in 1972.
- The All Manipur Women Kang Association, formed in 1982.

In 1960, the All Manipur Kang Association revised their regulations to establish a standard version of Kanglon utilized throughout the state. The Manipur Kang Control Board was created in 1972 with slightly altered rules. In 1989, the Manipur Kang Federation was founded to develop a unified set of regulations for Kanglon. This initiative resulted in modifications to the rules of both the All Manipur Kang Association and the Control Board, merging them into what is now referred to as the Federation Rules of 1989.
