= Atom Yoiremba =

King of Manipur from 1150 to 1163

King of Manipur
- Reign: 1150–1163
- Predecessor: Loitongba
- Successor: Hemtou Iwanthaba
- House: Ningthouja dynasty
- Father: Loitongba
- Religion: Sanamahism
- Occupation: Monarch of the Kangleipak kingdom

Atom Yoiremba was a Meitei king of the Ningthouja dynasty of Medieval Kangleipak who ruled from 1150 to 1163. He succeeded his father Loitongba. However, he was expelled out of his kingdom by his brother Hemtou Iwanthaba in 1163 and took shelter in the Khuman kingdom.
