= Khagemba =

16th-century Meitei monarch

Khagemba (Old Manipuri: Khaki Ngampa)
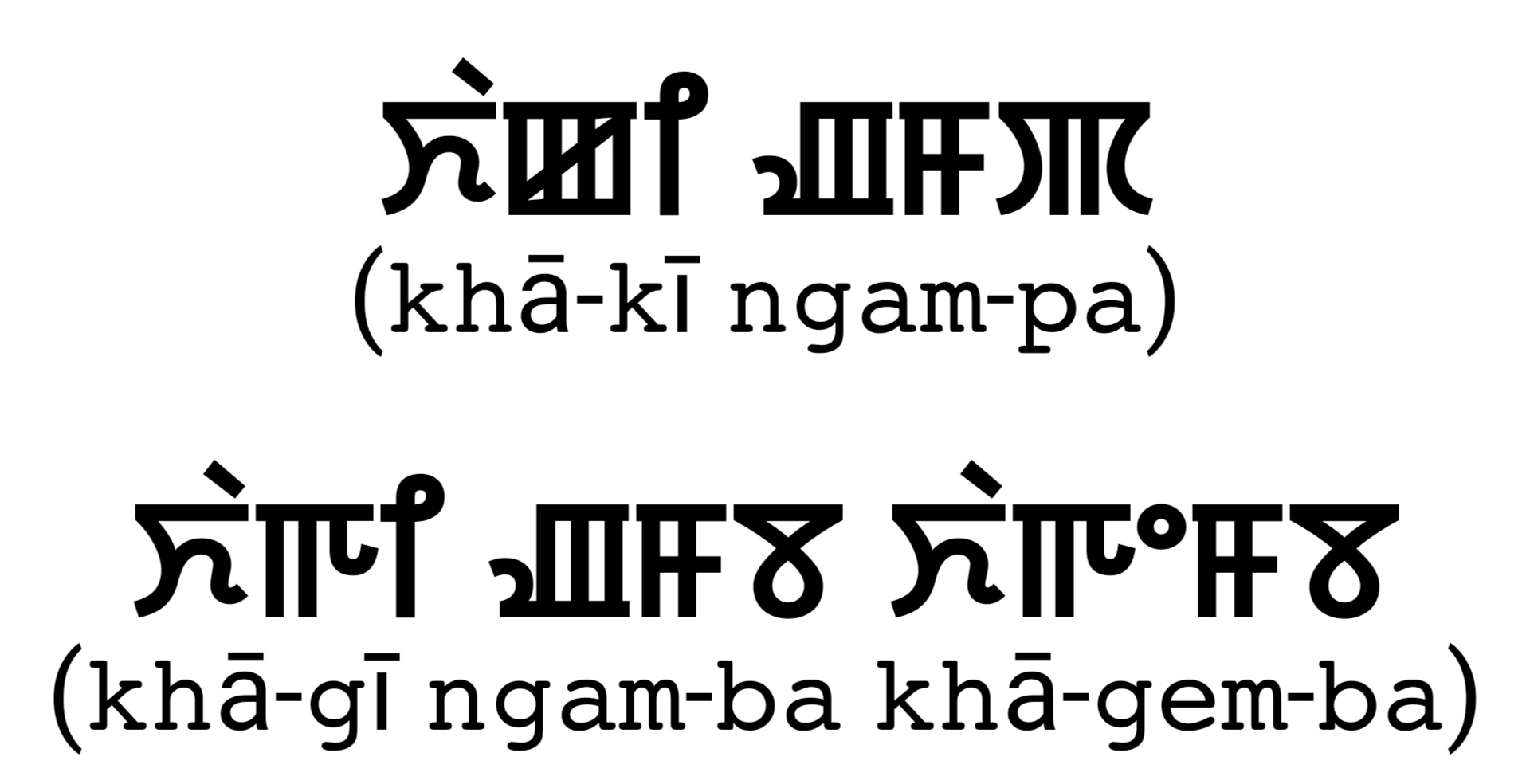
- "Khaki Ngampa" (Ancient Meitei name) and "Khagi Ngamba Khagemba" (Modern Meitei name) of the Meitei king, the ruler of Kangleipak (Meitei for 'Manipur')
- Successor: Khunjaoba
- Born: Ningthou Hanba; Kangla

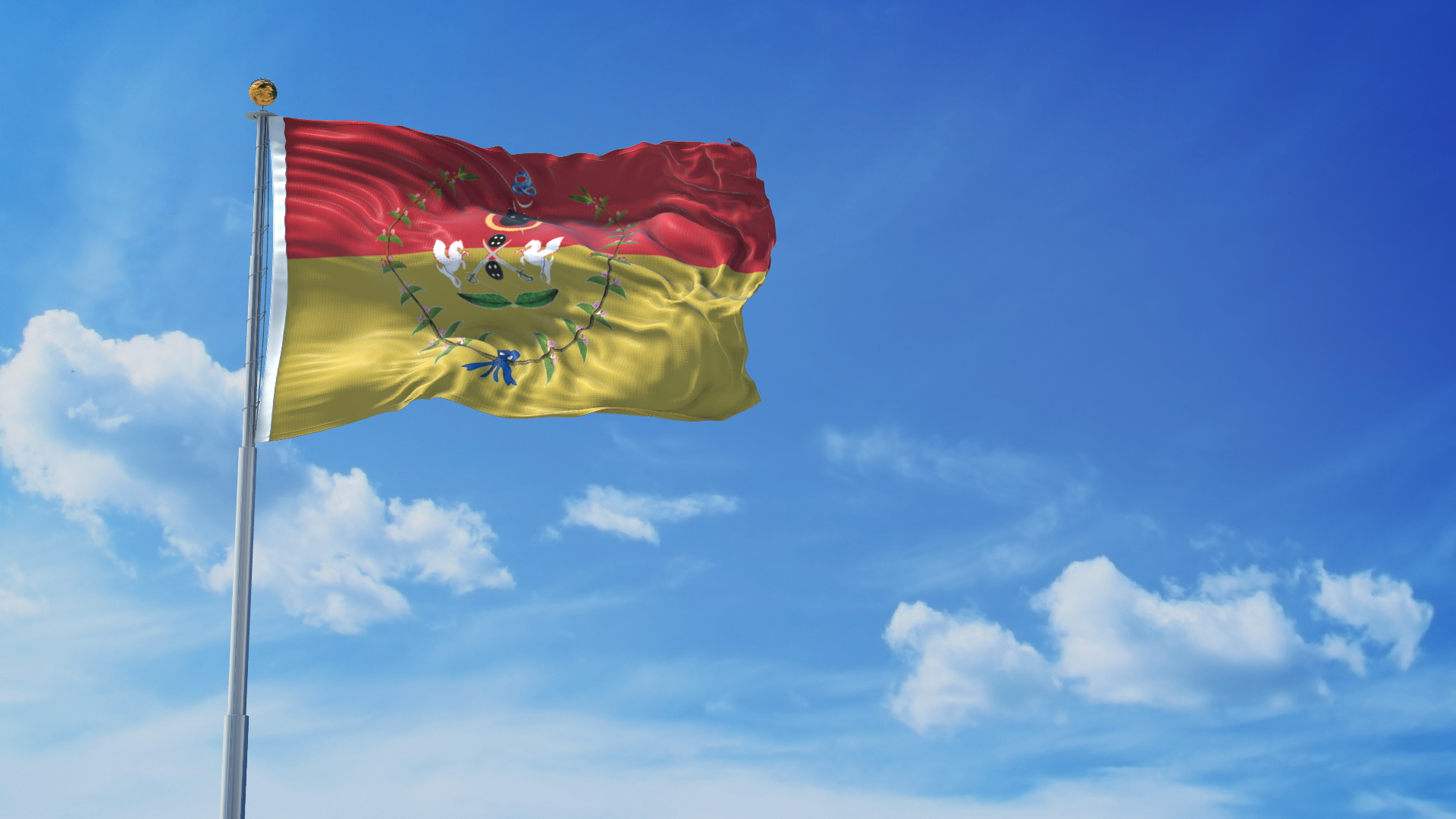
Flag of Meidingu Senbi Khagemba (1597-1652 AD)

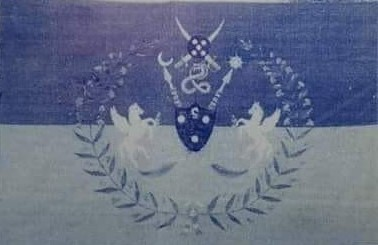
Flag used during the era of King Khagemba

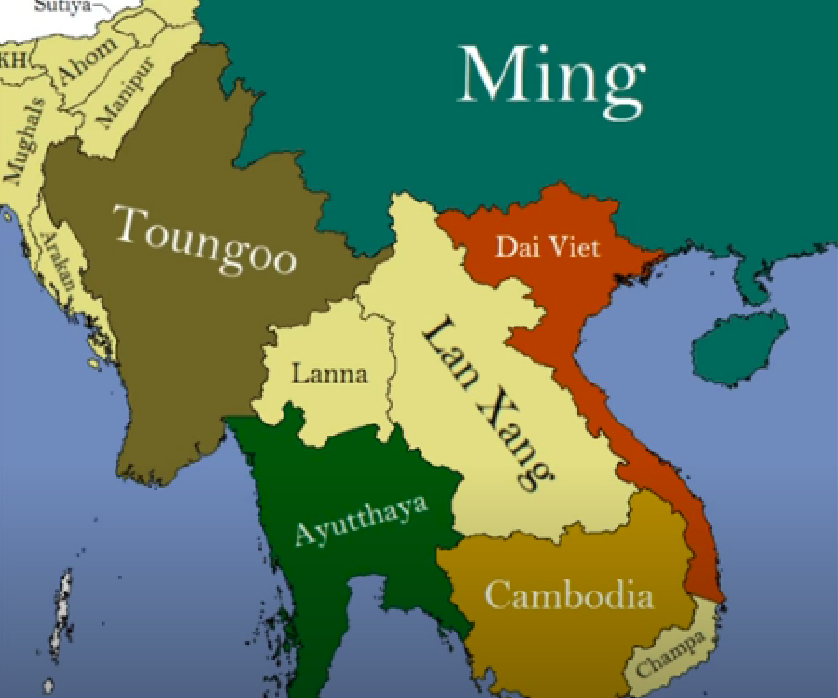
Map of Kangleipak (Meitei for 'Manipur') and other South East Asian realms during King Khagemba's reign

King Khagemba (Conqueror of the Chinese; 1597–1654) was a monarch from the Kingdom of Kangleipak. He also introduced a new form of polo and new apparel styles. Under his regime he focused on a new form of Manipur and built many markets in different places, like the Ema market. During his regime many Chinese workers built bridges and walls. The present-day Kangla gate was also built by captured Chinese workers who taught the Manipuris how to make bricks. He was called "The conqueror of the Chinese" or "Khagemba" (khage-Chinese and ngamba-win over) after defeating the Chinese at the northern border of the kingdom. Also during his time, Manipur introduced coins widely in the kingdom. Under his regime there was a migration of Muslims into the kingdom, and Manipur established good relationships with the Mughal Empire.

== Military career ==
=== Initial Conflict With Mughals ===
Most of the northwestern parts of the Indian Subcontinent were already under Islamic invasion till the 15th century. In 1606 CE, when the Mughals launched attacks on Manipur under the leadership of Shahjahan, Ningthou Hanba's younger brother, Prince Sanongba, betrayed his kingdom, joining the Mughal army, aspiring to become the new King of Manipur. The Mughal Army and Sanongba were defeated and captured in Cachar. King Ningthou Hanba brought many Mughal soldiers as POWs.

=== Conflict With Chinese ===
In 1631 CE, the Chinese Emperor Chongzhen of the Ming Dynasty went on a trail to expand the southeastern borders of his Empire. After successfully capturing Myanmar, he marched towards Manipur. Maharaja Ningthou Hanba defeated the Chinese Army, and Emperor Chongzhen fled back to Yunnan. Ningthou Hanba brought many Chinese POWs and employed the skilled Chinese POWs in constructing bridges. The historical hump-backed arch bridge over Nambul River at Khwairam-band Bazar and the gate at the royal palace were built by the Chinese POWs. Bricks were made for the 1st time in Manipur; these Chinese bricks were small in size and were not burnt fully. The Chinese word for "brick" was adopted into the Manipuri language.

=== Conflict with Burmese ===
The Burmese invasion of Manipur took place in 1649 CE, which was easily brought to a halt by Khagemba's interference.

=== Conflict with Tripuris ===
Khagemba had wars with the Tripuris in 1603 and 1634. In the war of 1634, his army captured 200 people of Tripura.

== See also ==
- List of Manipuri kings
- Manipur (princely state)
