= Stonehenge of Manipur =

Indian geographical structure

Coordinates: 25.4701°N 93.9731°E

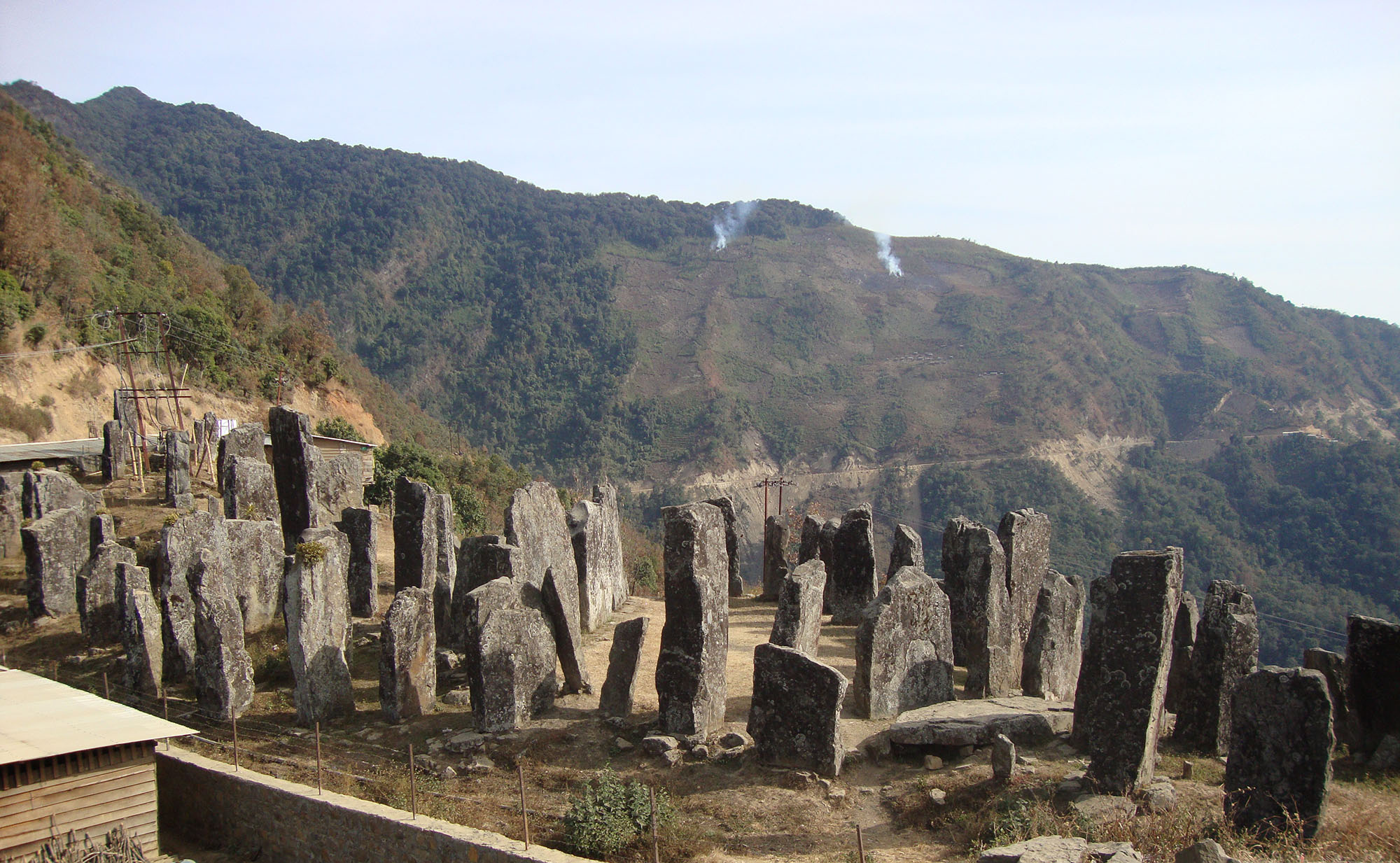
Stonehenge of Manipur

The Stonehenge of Manipur is an ancient pre-historic megalithic monument in the northern mountains of Willong Khullen in Senapati district, Manipur, India. It has been likened to England's megalith at Stonehenge. Legend says the gigantic stone structures located at the site were originally erected by the forefathers of the present day Maram people.
