= Ningthoukhongjam Khelchandra =

Indian writer and lexicographer

- Born: 1 September 1920; Uripok Ningthoukhongjam Leikai, Imphal, Manipur, India
- Died: 31 January 2011 (aged 90); Imphal, Manipur, India
- Resting place: Uripok Ningthoukhongjam Leikai; 24°48′20″N 93°55′24″E
- Other name: Pundit Ningthoukhongjam Khelchandra Singh
- Occupations: Writer; Lexicographer; Historian
- Known for: Manipuri to Manipuri and English dictionary
- Children: 5 sons and 5 daughters
- Awards: Padma Shri; Sahitya Akademi Fellowship; Sangeet Natak Akademi Fellowship; President's Silver Medal; Manipuri Sahitya Parishad Gavesana Bhusan; Manipur State Kala Akademi Fellowship

Ningthoukhongjam Khelchandra Singh was an Indian writer, lexicographer and historian, known as the author of Manipuri to Manipuri and English, the first modern general dictionary in Meitei language, which was published in 1964. He was a fellow of the Sahitya Akademi and Sangeet Natak Akademi. The Government of India awarded him the fourth highest civilian honour of Padma Shri in 1987.

== Biography ==
Khelchandra Singh was born on 1 September 1920 at Uripok Ningthoukhongjam Leikai, a small hamlet in Imphal, the capital of the northeast Indian state of Manipur. He did his studies in the traditional way under many teachers such as Dinachandra Singh, Pandit Parasuram, Pandit Madhop, Pandit Chandra and Pandit Deva Singh. His career started at Manipur Secretariat and spent the whole of his career with the Government of Manipur to retire as an under secretary. After superannuation from service, he worked as a visiting faculty at the Jawaharlal Nehru University Centre, Imphal for a brief period. He was associated with several Meitei cultural and historical associations. He served as the president of Manipur Historical Society and Manipur Sahitya Parishad and was the vice president of Jawaharlal Nehru Manipur Dance Academy, Imphal. He was the president of Manipuri Martial Arts Association and Atombapu Research Centre, Manipur and sat on the expert committees of Manipur State Kala Akademi, Department of Arts and Culture and Manipur University. He represented Manipur at several sessions of Indian Historical Records Commission, Purba Bharat Sankritic Sammelan, Kolkata, Indian History Congress, Bombay and Indo-Myanmar Trade and Economic Co-operation Seminar, Mandalay.

He died on 31 January 2011, aged 90, at Imphal, of age related illnesses.

== Books ==
Khelchandra Singh wrote in Meitei and English and is known to have published over 30 books. Manipuri to Manipuri and English Dictionary, published in 1964, is reported to be the first modern general dictionary in Meitei language. Another book of linguistics he wrote is Manipuri Language-Status and Importance, which was published in 1975. He transliterated Uttarakhand Ramayana and Ashamedha Parba Mahabharat from Old Meitei to modern Meitei. As a historian, he edited eight books, Genealogy of Manipuri Kings, Cheitharol Kumbaba, royal chronicles of Manipur, an anthology of Old Meitei poems, an anthology of Old Meitei prose, a collection of hymns and prayers prevalent in Pre-Vaishnavite Manipur, An account of the hills of Manipur, A treatise on Manuscripts, and Sarit Sarat, a book on the heroic accounts of Manipuri Martial Combats. One of his books, History of Old Manipuri Literature (Ariba Maṇipurī Sahityagī Itihasa), is a text book for post graduate and research studies. Among his books written in English are Battle of Khongjom, (an account of the last battle between Manipur and the British forces) Documents of Anglo-Manipuri War 1891 (three volumes), Thangal General (life history of the renowned Meitei warrior) and Kangla. He also contributed two chapters of the book, Dictionary of National Biography, the biographies of Pandit Raj Atombapu Sharma and Thangal General.

== Awards and honours ==
Khelchandra Singh received a service excellence award, the President's Silver Medal, in 1951, for his services during the 1951 Census of India. Manipuri Sahitya Parishad awarded him the Gavesana Bhusan award for his research activities in 1971 and he was elected as a fellow of the Manipur State Kala Akademi in 1980. The Government of India awarded him the civilian honour of Padma Shri in 1987. Three years later, Sahitya Akademi chose him as their fellow in 1999 and the Sangeet Natak Akademi followed suit with their fellowship in 2006. Manipur Historical Society have instituted an annual lecture, Pandit Ningthoukhongjam Khelchandra Singh Memorial Lecture, in honour of Singh.

== See also ==
- Meitei literature
- Cheitharol Kumbaba
