= Ancient Meitei language =

Sino-Tibetan language

Ancient Meitei
- Old Manipuri
- Ariba Meiteilon/Ariba Manipuri (ꯑꯔꯤꯕ ꯃꯩꯇꯩꯂꯣꯟ/ꯑꯔꯤꯕ ꯃꯅꯤꯄꯨꯔꯤ)
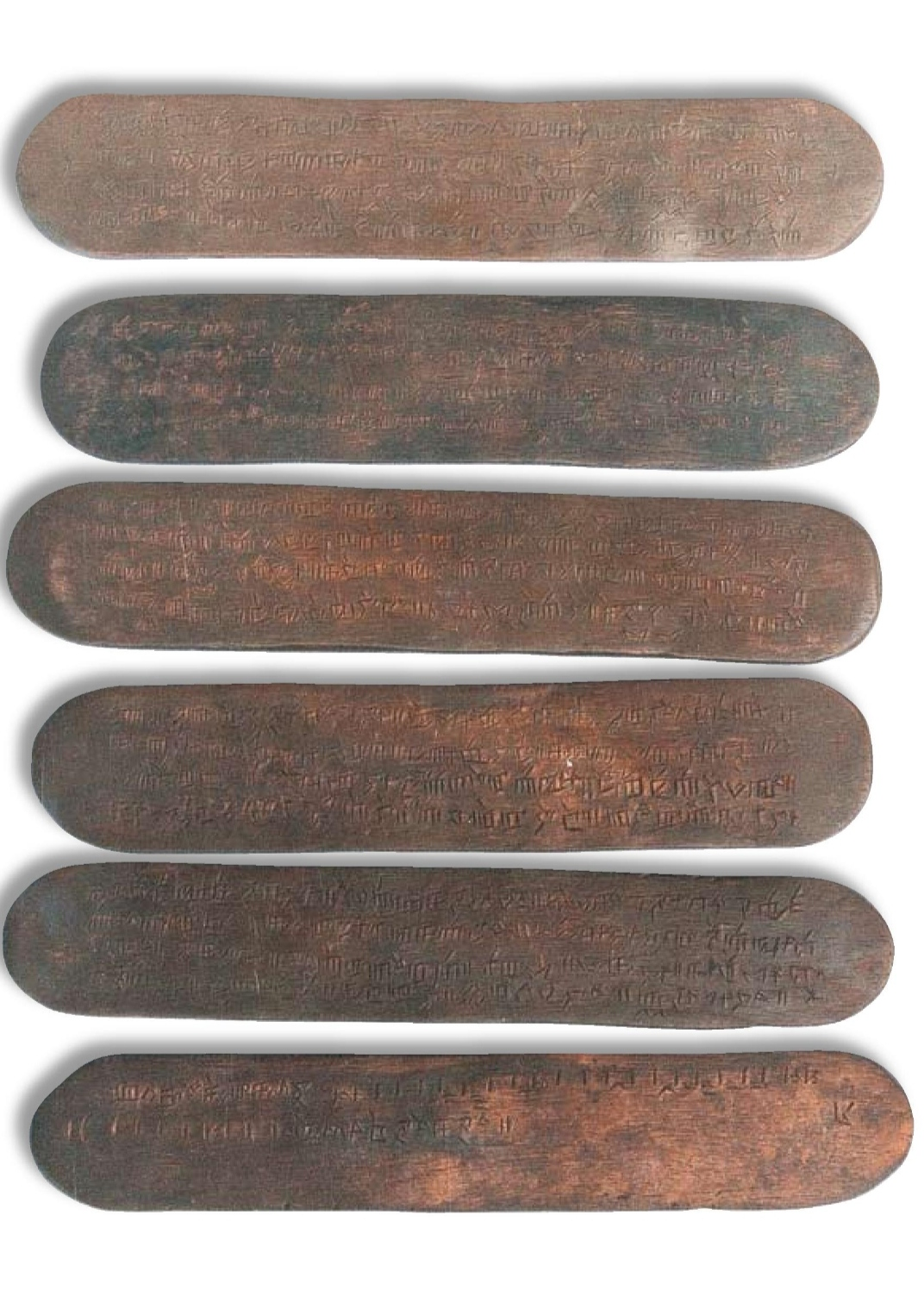
- Yumbanlol (Yumpanlol), a 6th century collection of Meitei language copper plate inscribed texts, in Meetei script
- Ethnicity: various groups of the Meitei confederacy
- Era: Ancient Kangleipak (early Manipur)
- Language family: Sino-Tibetan: Tibeto-Burman; Ancient Meitei
- Early forms: Proto-Sino-Tibetan: Proto-Tibeto-Burman?
- Dialects: Khuman (in Khuman kingdom); Moirang (in Moirang kingdom)
- Writing system: Meitei script

Official status
- Official language in: Ancient Kangleipak (early Manipur)

Language codes
- ISO 639-3: omp
- Glottolog: None

Ancient Meitei (also known as Old Manipuri, Ariba Manipuri, or Areeba Manipuri, Ariba Meiteilon, or Meiteirol Ariba, Archaic Manipuri, or Old Meithei, or Archaic Meithei) is the earliest historical stage of the Meitei language. It was spoken by the various Yek Salai groups of the Meitei confederacy in Ancient Kangleipak (early Manipur) before the emergence of later forms of the language. According to the Indian Institute of Advanced Study, the old period of the language existed till 1675 CE, because there was no significant influence of any other group on the language before that time.

Old Meitei gave rise to Modern Meitei, (Note: passing through Medieval Meitei language) by passing through its early phases of literary and script usage. In the Tibeto-Burman classification, it is recognized as a distinct linguistic unit. Thus, through its historical development and its tradition of literacy and culture, it has established itself as a significant written language in its own right.

== Writing system ==
Meitei Mayek, also known as Meetei Mayek, was used to write ancient Meitei language, in stone inscriptions, copper plate inscriptions and manuscript texts.

== Literature ==
"The beginning of this old Manipuri literature (as in the case of Newari) may go back to 1500 years, or even 2000 years, from now."

— Suniti Kumar Chatterji, Indian scholar and Padma Vibhushan awardee

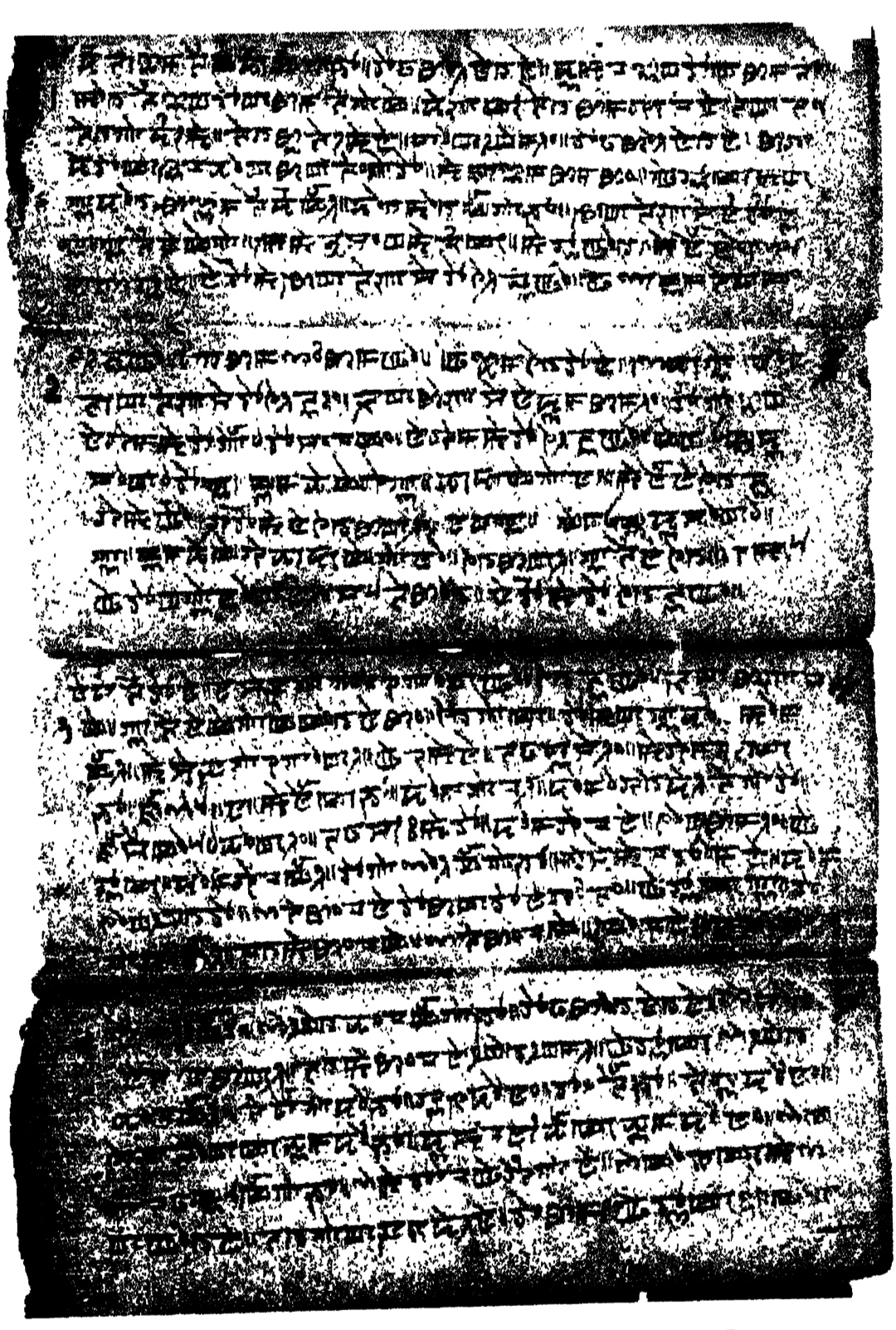
Lammitlon Puya, a book of toponyms of Ancient Kangleipak

The earliest known ancient Meitei language compositions are the Ougri ritual song (before the Common Era) the Numit Kappa (1st century CE) the Poireiton Khunthok (3rd century CE) the Yumbanlol copper plate inscriptions (c. 6th-7th century CE) the Khencho poetry (7th century CE) Khongtekcha's copper plate inscriptions (c. 763-773 CE), the Panthoibi Khonggul (7th-8th century CE).

According to Indian scholar Ningthoukhongjam Khelchandra, (Note: also spelled as Khelachandra) the ancient Meitei canon has a large collection of broad categories or genres, including (1) literary, (2) Laihui (origin of deities, cults and pantheon), (3) Chinglon (accounts for hills and mountains), (4) Nunglon (accounts on stones and rocks), (5) Khunthoklon (accounts on early human migrations, leading to settlements and civilisations), (6) Meihouron/Meihourol (other accounts on ancient human settlements), (7) Wayen Pathap/Wayel Pathap (judiciary system), (8) Lammitlon (geography and topography), (9) Leisem Nongsemlon / Leishem Nongshemlon (cosmogony and cosmology), (10) Yangpi/Yangbi (ways of different religious and philosophical ideology), (11) Sekning/Shekning, (12) Nauyom/Naoyom, (13) Jagoi Eesei/Isei (dance and music), (14) Sa Lan / Sha Lan (hunting and battles), (15) Tungda Thoklakkadaba (future telling, fortune telling, prophecy), (16) Khonggul/Khongkul (accounts on tracing origins), (17) astrology, (18) Laining Lambi (ways of religious life), (19) Laiphamlon (accounts on holy and sacred sites), (20) Laiyeng Pathap (traditional medicine), (21) Eerat Thounirol / Irat Thouniron (accounts on worship, rites and rituals), (22) Laison Tinson / Laisol Tinsol (accounts on holy and sacred chantings and hymns), (23) historical genre, (24) purely religious genre, (25) Thiren/Thilen/Thilel/Thirel (accounts on great searchings and findings), (26) Mahou, and (27) Paorou Paotak (sayings, proverbs, maxims).

=== Ritual practices ===
Ancient Meitei hymns form a part of the Meitei folklore associated primarily with Sanamahism, the indigenous religion of the Meitei civilisation. These are typically recited or sung during religious ceremonies, seasonal Meitei festivals, and rites of passage. The content of the hymns includes invocations to deities, cosmological narratives, and expressions of ethical or spiritual principles. Notable songs and hymns are Sana Lamok, Apoklon, Mei, Nonglao Eesei, Louta Eesei, and Phoukouron. Ancient Meitei ritual songs are closely associated with the Lai Haraoba festival, notably Ougri, Khencho, Anoirol, and Lairemma Paosa. These compositions are traditionally considered to have been performed since the inception of the festival.

=== Administration, governance and law ===
The Loiyumpa Silyel (Modern Meitei: "Loiyumba Sinyen") (Note: also termed as the Loyumpa Silyel (Modern Meitei: "Loyumba Sinyen") or the Loiyumpa Shilyel (Modern Meitei: "Loiyumba Shinyen") or the Loyumpa Shilyel (Modern Meitei: "Loyumba Shinyen") or the Loyamba Sinyen (Old Manipuri: Loyampa Sinyen)) is an 11th-12th century written constitution, regulated in the Manipur kingdom during the regime of King Loiyumba (1074-1122 CE). A promulgation of the proto-constitution in 429 CE by King Naophangba was reduced to a final format in 1110 CE.

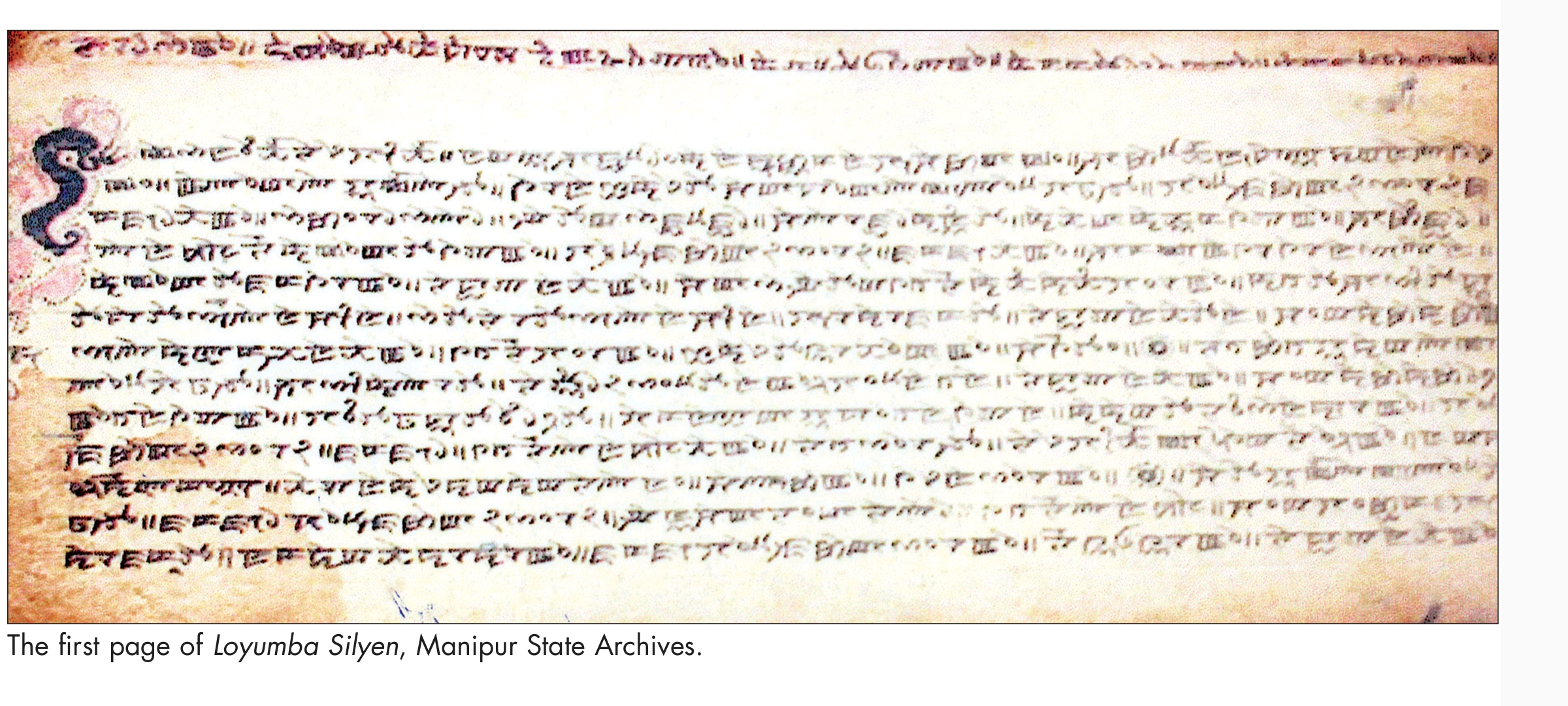
The first page of Loyumba Silyen (Loiyumpa Silyel), an 11th-12th century Meitei language Constitution of the then Kangleipak in traditional Meetei Mayek writing system (Manipur State Archives)

== Scholars and scribes ==
In ancient Kangleipak (early Manipur), rulers often patronised the institutions of scholars and scribes to produce and maintain a large collection of manuscript books. One institution was called Maichou Loishang (also spelled as Maichou Loisang). In Meitei language, Loishang or Loisang means office or department, and Maichou literally means "great Maiba", which is a term used to refer to all the scholars. In the medieval times, this old institution of Maichou Loishang later got its parallel institution of Meitei Hindu culture as Pandit Loisang (Pandit Loishang), getting influenced by the Indo-Aryan culture from Bengal. In Sanskrit and Bengali languages, the word Pandit means a scholar.

== Revival and preservation efforts ==
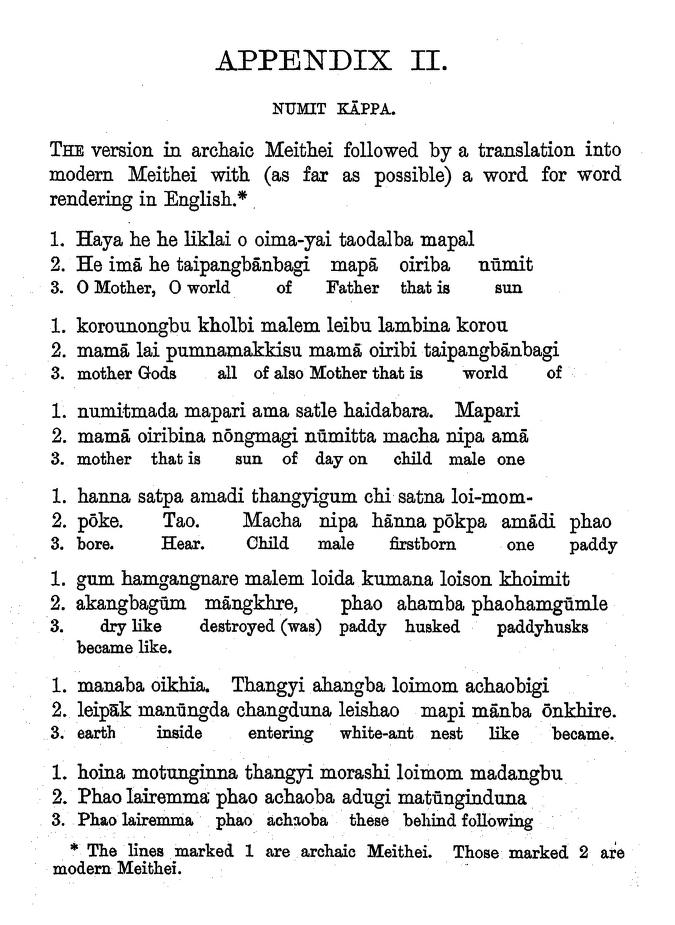
The Classical Meitei epic text “Numit Kappa” in Archaic Meitei, Modern Meitei and English languages, published in the 1908 encyclopedia “The Meitheis” (page no. 188) by British scholar Thomas Callan Hodson

Many scholars in modern times make efforts to revive and preserve ancient Meitei language and literature, by translating from Ancient Meitei to Modern Meitei, transliterating from old Meitei script to modern Meitei script and Bengali script, and publishing dual versions, simultaneously, so that modern population can easily get access to the ancient Meitei linguistic cultural heritage. Oinam Bhogeshwar translated, transliterated and published the following in Modern Meitei versions:

- Ningthourol Sheireng (1967)
- Moirang Ningthourol Lambuba
- Ningthourol Lambuba (1967/68)
- Sanamahi Laikan (Imphal : 1972)
- Nongsamei Puya, Imphal, 1973
- Loyumba Sinyen (1975)

=== Dictionary ===
Ariba Manipuri Longei: Old Manipuri to modern Manipuri Dictionary, was authored by Ningthoukhongjam Khelchandra Singh, under the publication of Manipur State Kala Akademy, Imphal, in 1978.

=== Annual educational competition ===
Starting from 2011, the Students’ Union of Kangleipak (SUK) annually organises the All Kangleipak Ancient Manipuri Language (Kanglei-lon) Meaning Competition (Meitei: Kangleipak Pumbagi Ariba Lon (Kanglei-lon) gi Wahanthok Changdamnaba) as an educational initiative to promote knowledge, preservation, and wider appreciation of Ancient Manipuri (Kanglei-lon) vocabulary and the state's linguistic heritage. Open to students from school through postgraduate level, the competition assesses participants' understanding of the meanings of traditional Meitei words and expressions, encouraging the study of indigenous linguistic traditions alongside contemporary education. Conducted in multiple stages, the programme recognises outstanding performers with cash prizes, certificates, mementoes, and consolation awards for finalists, emphasising on academic achievement and language preservation. Organised alongside SUK's State-Level Spelling Competition, the initiative forms part of the organisation's broader efforts towards linguistic excellence, strengthen awareness of Manipur's cultural heritage, encouraging younger generations to engage with and preserve the historical vocabulary of the Meitei language.

== Vocabulary ==
English	Archaic Meithei	Modern Meithei	Etymological Notes
button	punuŋ həyru	hayru	punuŋ 'shirt'
destination	waythuŋ- phəm	thuŋphəm	way 'whereabout', thun 'reach' phəm 'place'
fishing trap	lolu	lu	lon, 'weave', lu 'trap'
fishing trap	luphui	lu	phui 'bear, give birth'
house	lol yim	yum	yim is presumably the same as yum 'house'
to call	pəw kəwbə	kəwbə	pəw 'news' kəw 'call'
to fear	soŋ kiba	kibə	soŋ 'dense' ki 'fear'
to seat	phəmphəm bə	phəmbə	phəm 'seat' (noun) 'seat'
tusk	ləŋŋoy moysəyə	səmmu məya	ləŋŋoy 'elephant', səmmu 'elephant'.

== Sample texts ==
The following Old Meitei writings are from an inscription, found in Manipur. Its Modern Meitei equivalent words and literal English translations and formal English translation are also given together.

Languages	Sentences
Section 1
Ancient Meitei	Laailemaa chingthaalaalimaamubhu.
Modern Meitei	Laairemma chingtharaklibabu.
English Literal	Lairemma which was brought down.
Section 2
Ancient Meitei	Khaakhaaikhingalbhaana khangdaadunaa. thak
Modern Meitei	Khaakhaaikhingalbhanaa khangdaduna. thak
English Literal	by Khaakhaaikhingalbha because he was unaware. on
Section 3
Ancient Meitei	khudadaa kum. Khouthabhaakaa
Modern Meitei	khukaada kumme. kouthabaga
English Literal	the seat descended. as it was invoked
Section 4
Ancient Meitei	aangaale. aakiba. kaakei.
Modern Meitei	ngaallee. akiba. kaakei.
English Literal	brightened. by a radiance of light. frightened.
Section 5
Ancient Meitei	Laarembhaanaa thouchaalchaarambhaame.
Modern Meitei	Laairembina thoujanbiriramme.
English Literal	by the goddess graced with kindness.
Section 6
Ancient Meitei	Kamthouchaasalkaa thounaadabha amarak ma Haaraak.
Modern Meitei	Konthoujamga thounaaidaba amurak hannaa Haaorok
English Literal	Konthoujam on the service once more Haaorok
FREE TRANSLATION: The likeness of the goddess, which was brought down by Kaagingamba because he was unaware, descended on the seat. As an invocation to the goddess was performed a bright radiant light frightened the king. Graced by the goddess with kindness, then Konthoujam Haaork once more continued in her service.

== Gallery ==
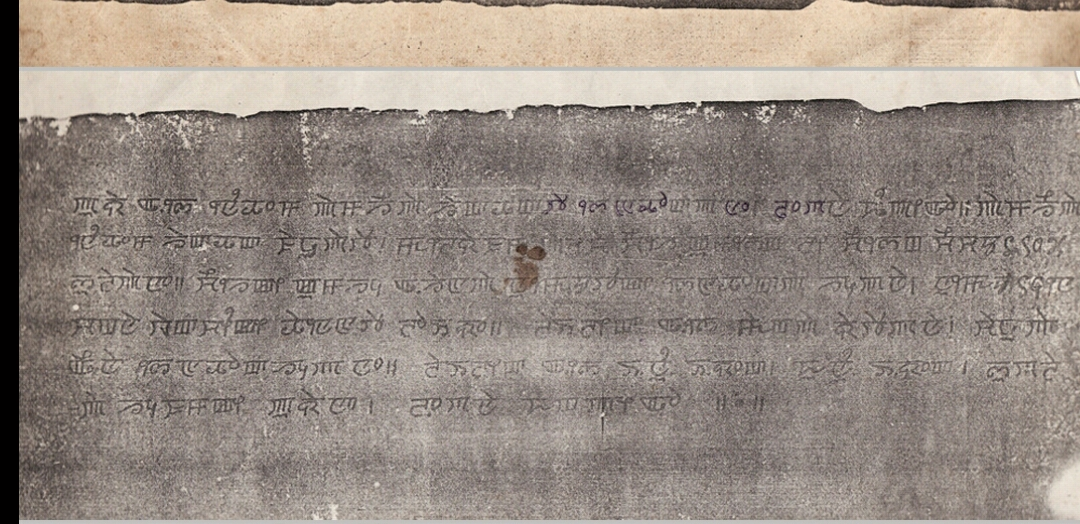

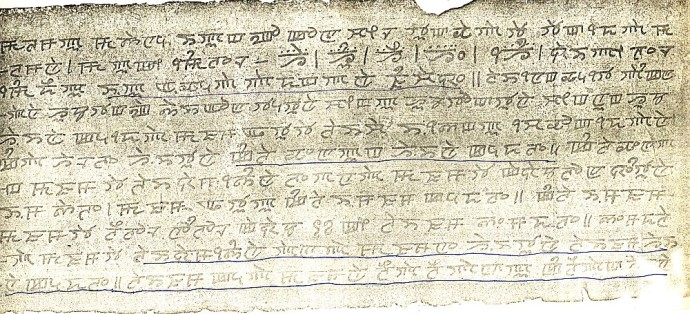

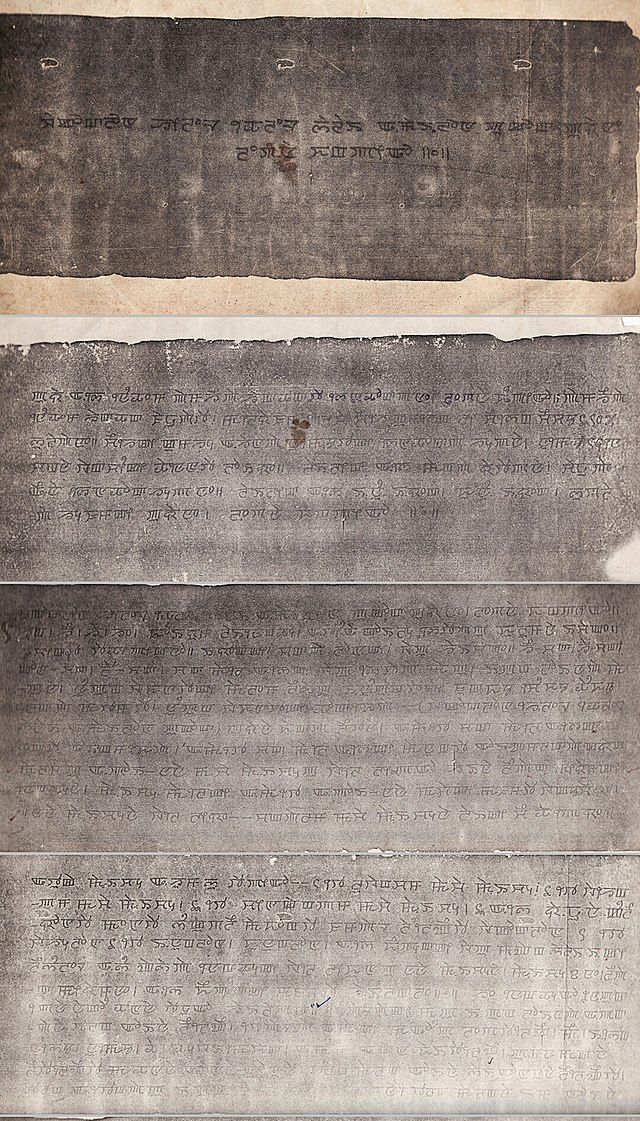

== See also ==
- State Level Committee for declaration of Manipuri Language as Classical Language of India
- Puya (Meitei texts)
- Puya Mei Thaba
- History of Manipur
