= Kangleipak =

Early Meitei civilization

Ancient Kangleipak ꯀꯪꯂꯩꯄꯥꯛ
- 33 BCE–21 September 1949
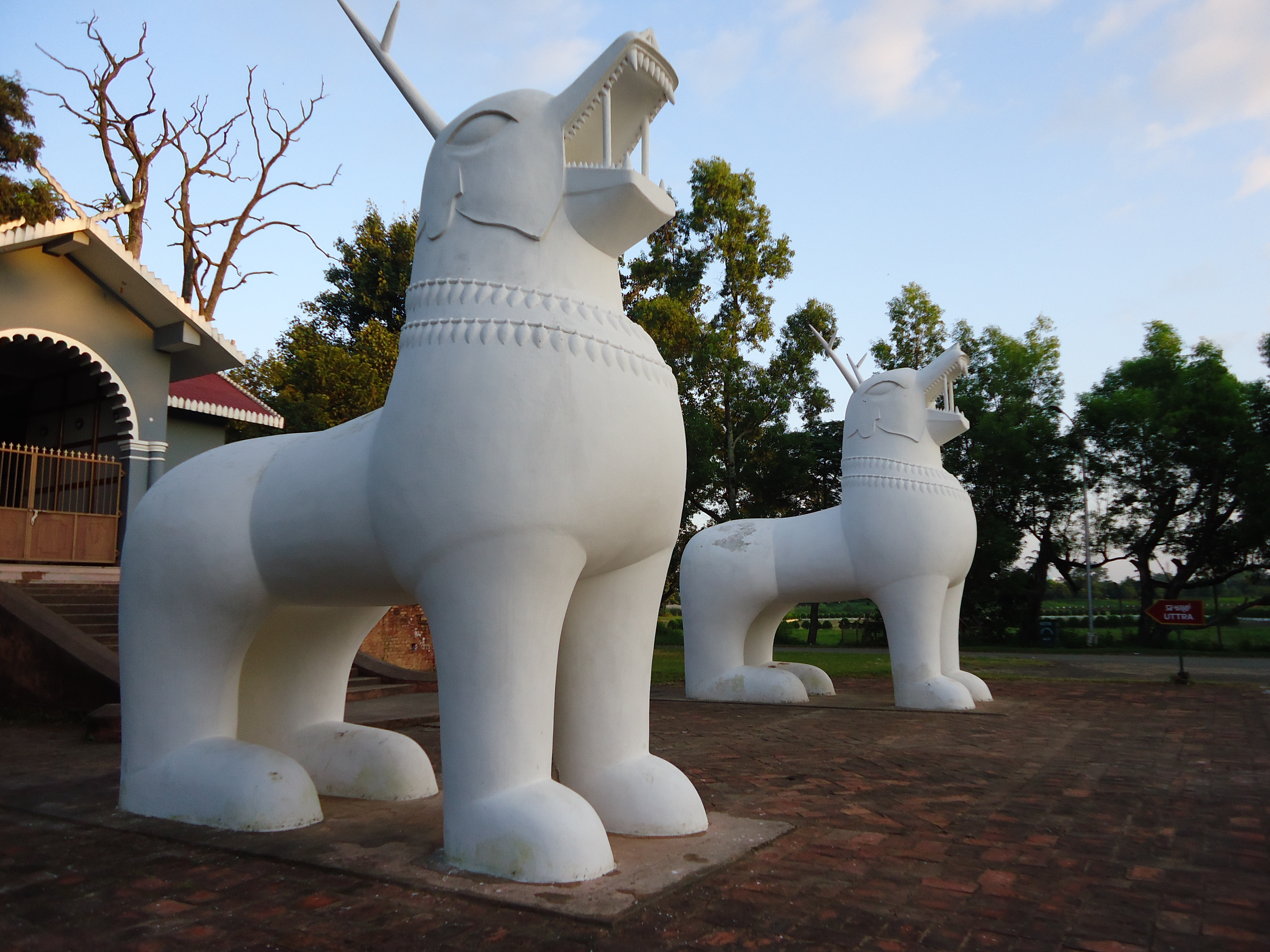
- Kangla Sha statue at Kangla Fort
- Capital: Kangla
- Demonym: Kangleicha
- Government
  - Type: Monarchy
- King
  - 33 CE: Nongdā Lāiren Pākhangbā (historical founder)
- Legislature: Royal Court (Kangla)
- Historical era: Ancient / Medieval / Early Modern
  - Traditional founding: 33 BCE
  - Merger with India: 21 September 1949
Preceded by	Succeeded by
Salai Kingdoms	Manipur; Kabaw Valley
- Today part of: India; Myanmar

Kangleipak was an ancient, lesser known civilisation, consisting of the modern day Manipur, India which is still known to some residents as Kangleipak, and other neighbouring regions. The Kangla served as the foremost capital city of this realm from the 33 BCE, up to medieval times.

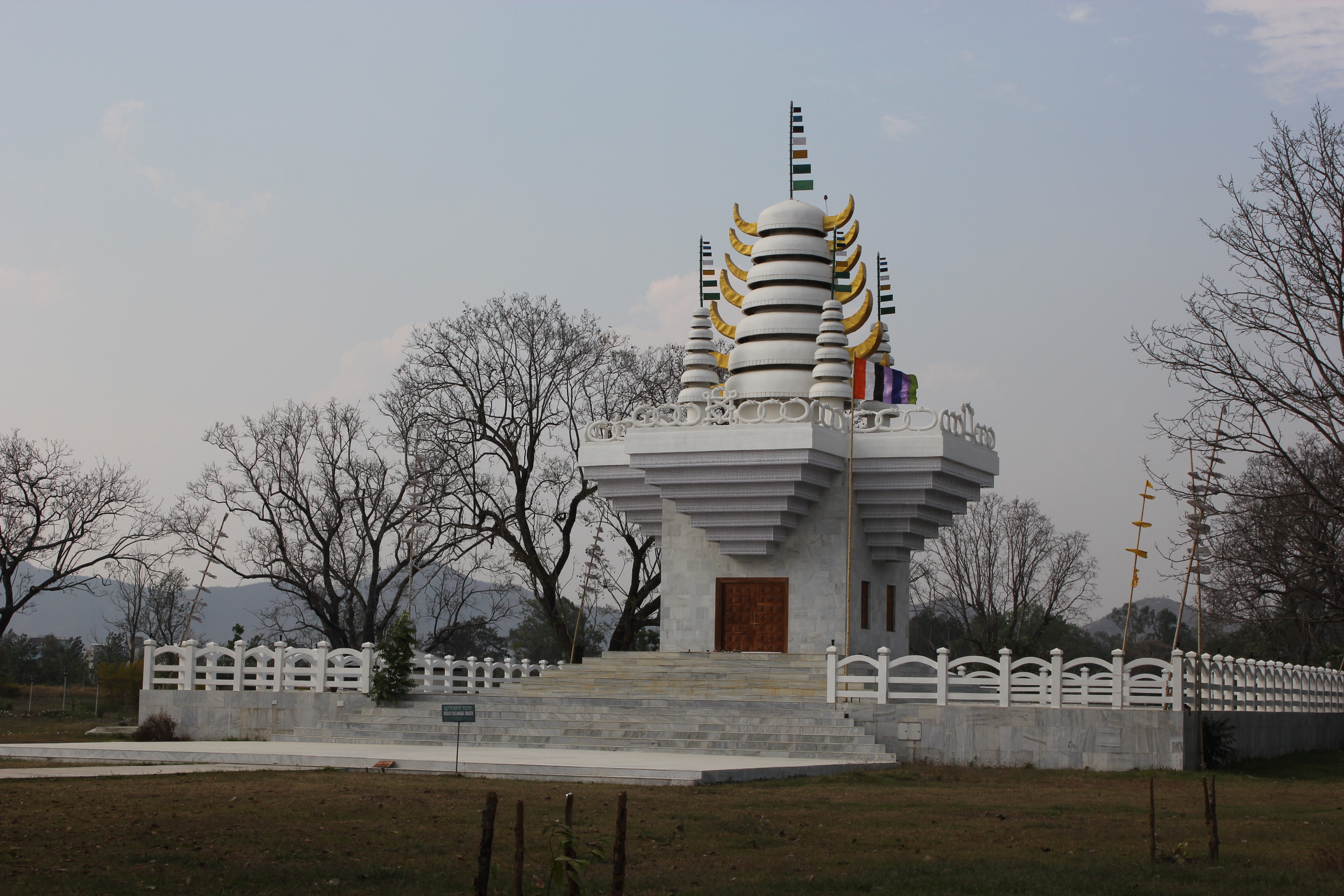
The ancient temple (rebuilt) of Lord Pakhangba inside the Kangla.

== History ==
The Kingdom of Kangleipak (present-day Manipur, India) was an independent monarchy with a rich cultural and political history. Traditionally believed to have been founded in 33 CE by King Nongdā Lāiren Pākhangbā, Kangleipak was ruled by Meitei kings, who established a distinct administrative system and patronised the indigenous Sanamahism religion.

Throughout its history, Kangleipak experienced periods of internal consolidation, external conflicts, and cultural exchanges with neighbouring regions, including Burma (Myanmar) and Assam. The kingdom saw a significant transformation during the reign of Gharib Niwaz (1709–1748), who expanded its territory and introduced Hinduism as a dominant religious influence.

In the 19th century, the Anglo-Manipur relations intensified, culminating in the Anglo-Manipur War of 1891, after which the British annexed the kingdom, making it a princely state under British rule. Following India’s independence in 1947, Kangleipak was merged into the Indian Union in 1949, leading to its present status as the state of Manipur.

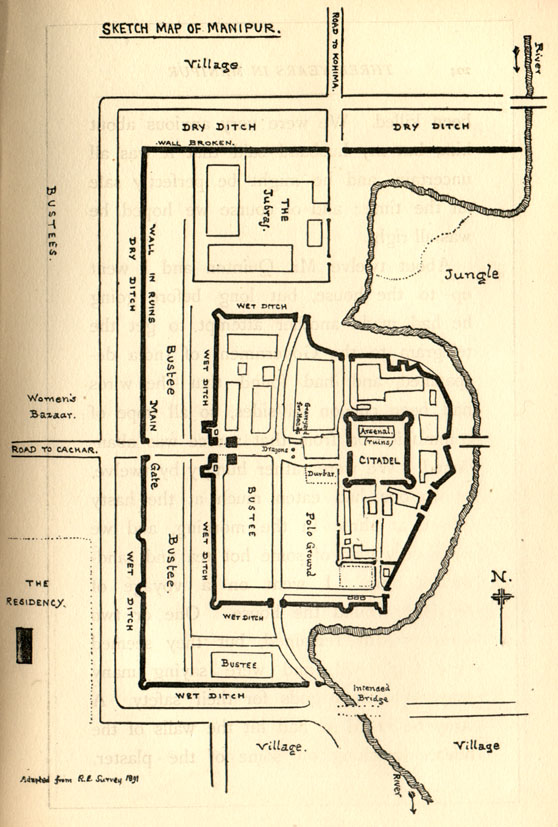
Layout of the citadel of Kangla, the foremost ancient capital city of Kangleipak (Manipur)

== Geography ==
The territory of this realm is mountainous and thereby, ancient Kangleipak consists of several smaller region each with its own dialect, cultural peculiarities, and identity. At one time during the reign of Meidingu Khagemba the territory of Kangleipak(Manipur) stretched up to the present Yunnan Province of modern day China. Kabaw valley in Myanmar was also a part of Manipur until the then Prime Minister Jawaharlal Nehru India gifted it to Myanmar on his visit to Manipur in 1952. Thibomei(now Kohima) was also once annexed by the then King Gambhir Singh.

In fact, there were seven independent kingdoms ruled by the seven clan dynasties in this realm. These seven principalities had their own capital cities.

Capital cities	Latin transliteration	Respective kingdoms	Latin transliteration	Ruling dynasties	Latin transliteration
ꯏꯝꯐꯥꯜ ꯀꯪꯂꯥ	Imphal Kangla	ꯏꯝꯐꯥꯜ	Imphal	ꯅꯤꯡꯊꯧꯖꯥ (ꯃꯉꯥꯡ)	Ningthouja (Mangang)
ꯂꯨꯋꯥꯡꯁꯪꯕꯝ ꯀꯪꯂꯥ	Luwangsangbam Kangla	ꯂꯨꯋꯥꯡꯁꯪꯕꯝ	Luwangsangbam	ꯂꯨꯋꯥꯡ	Luwang
ꯅꯣꯡꯌꯥꯢ ꯂꯩꯀꯣꯢꯄꯨꯡ	Nongyai Leikoipung	ꯃꯌꯥꯡ ꯏꯝꯐꯥꯜ	Mayang Imphal	ꯈꯨꯃꯟ	Khuman
ꯀꯣꯡꯕ ꯃꯔꯨ ꯀꯪꯂꯥ	Kongba Maru Kangla	ꯀꯣꯡꯕ ꯃꯔꯨ	Kongba Maru	ꯑꯉꯣꯝ	Angom
ꯃꯣꯢꯔꯥꯡ ꯀꯪꯂꯥ	Moirang Kangla	ꯀꯦꯀꯦ ꯃꯣꯢꯔꯥꯡ	Keke Moirang	ꯃꯣꯢꯔꯥꯡ ꯁꯂꯥꯢ	Moirang Salai
ꯇꯥꯛꯅꯈꯥ ꯄꯨꯔꯨꯛ ꯁꯧꯄꯤ ꯀꯪꯂꯥ	Taknakha Puruk Soupi Kangla	ꯇꯥꯛꯅꯈꯥ ꯄꯨꯔꯨꯛ ꯁꯧꯄꯤ	Taknakha Puruk Soupi	ꯈꯥ ꯉꯥꯟꯄ	Kha Nganpa
ꯂꯩꯁꯪꯈꯣꯡ ꯀꯪꯂꯥ	Leishangkhong Kangla	ꯂꯩꯁꯪꯈꯣꯡ	Leishangkhong	ꯁꯂꯥꯢ ꯂꯩꯁꯥꯡꯊꯦꯝ	Salai Leishangthem

== Language ==
The Ancient Meitei language (early form of the modern Meitei language) had a wide array of Meitei scriptures (Puya (Meitei texts)), of numerous topics, written in the archaic Meitei script. One of the oldest scriptures is the Wakoklon Heelel Thilen Salai Amailon Pukok Puya, written in 1398 BC (verified by the National Archives of India, New Delhi).

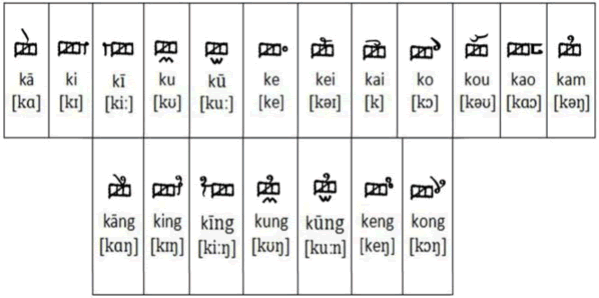
Ancient Manipuri alphabet

== Culture ==
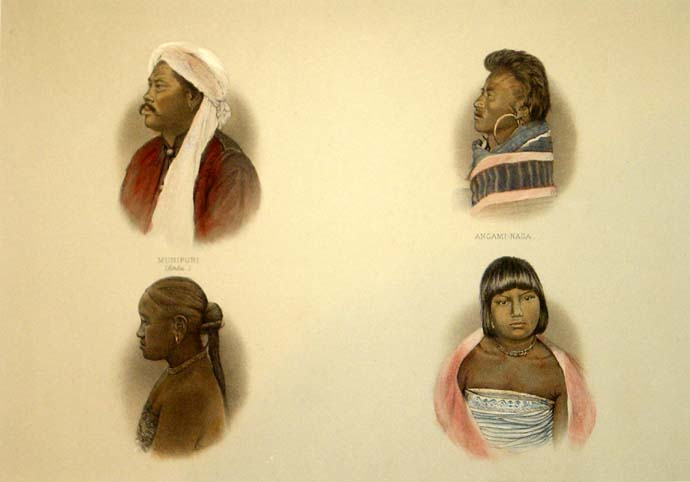
Illustration of common people of Kangleipak

=== Daily life ===
Most people of ancient Kangleipak were farmers tied to their lands. Their dwellings were restricted to immediate family members.

=== Architecture ===
The ancient architectural designs of common houses were believed to be sustainable, eco friendly and affordable. It gives a cooling effect during hot summer and a warming effect during chilling winter.

=== Religious beliefs ===
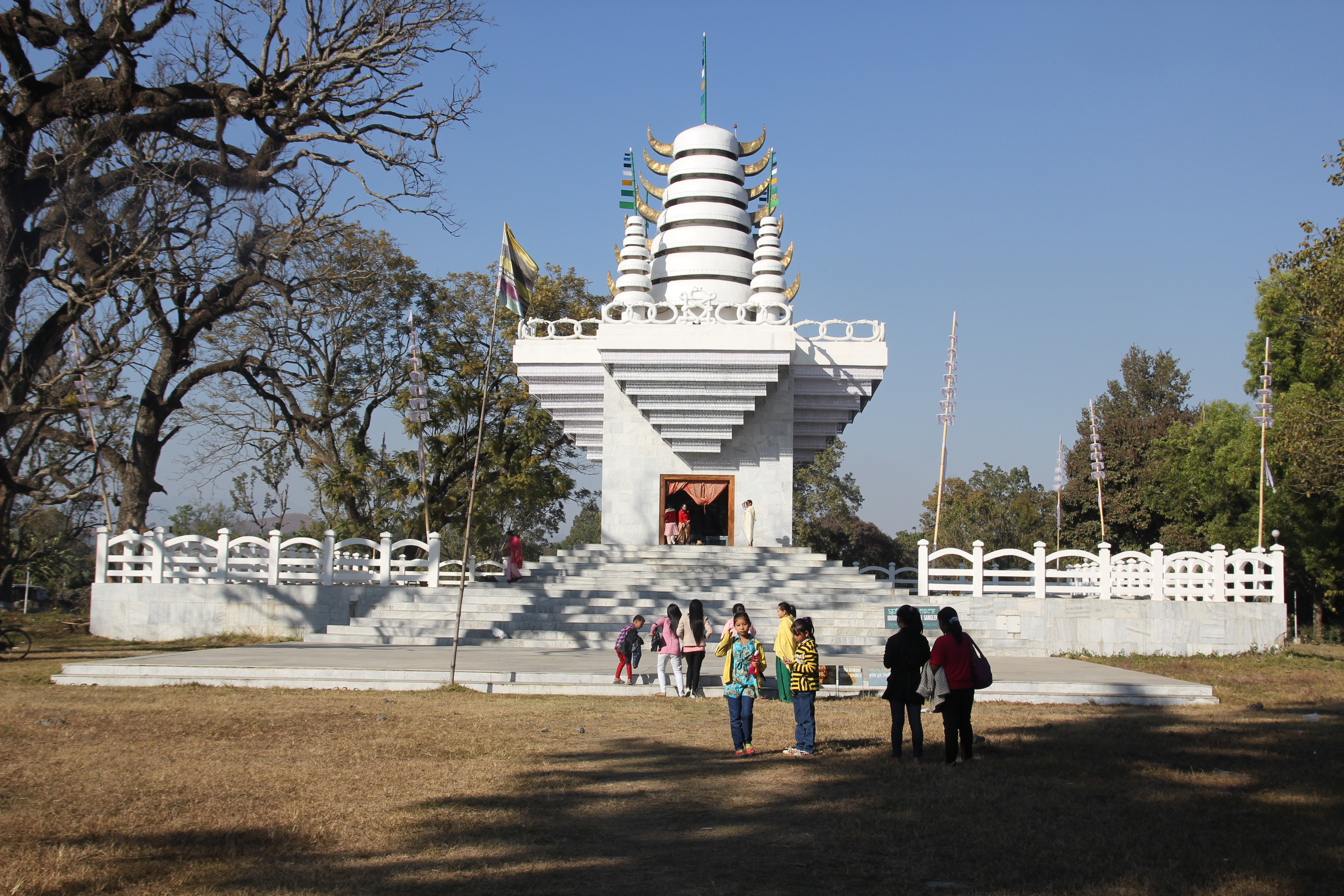

The ancient religion of the indigenous ethnicities of the hills and the plains is the Sanamahism. The abstract concept of the space time entity is the ultimate God creator of the universe. Beliefs in the divine and in the afterlife were ingrained in ancient Kangleipak from its inception. The ancient rulers were based on the divine right of kings.

== Military ==
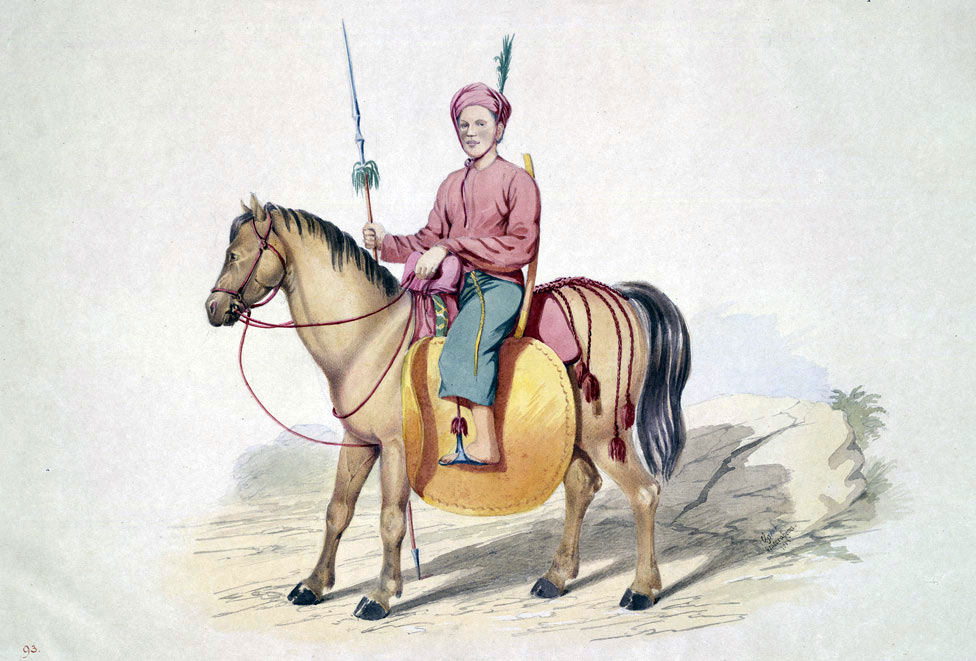
ancient Meitei horseman

The Ancient Meitei military ran in the Lallup system. Lal-lup system (literally, Lal means war; lup means club or association or organization) was a predominant system in ancient Kangleipak. According to the system, every men of indigenous ethnicity of above 16 years of age was a member.

== Related pages ==
- Puya Meithaba
- Stonehenge of Manipur
- Ancient Moirang

== Other websites ==
- Discovery of Kangleipak
- The Kingdom of Manipur
- Thawan Thaba burial discovery A medieval findings lost amidst tragic ignorance By Phanjoubam Chingkheinganba
