= Ananta Sai =

- Meitei Prince
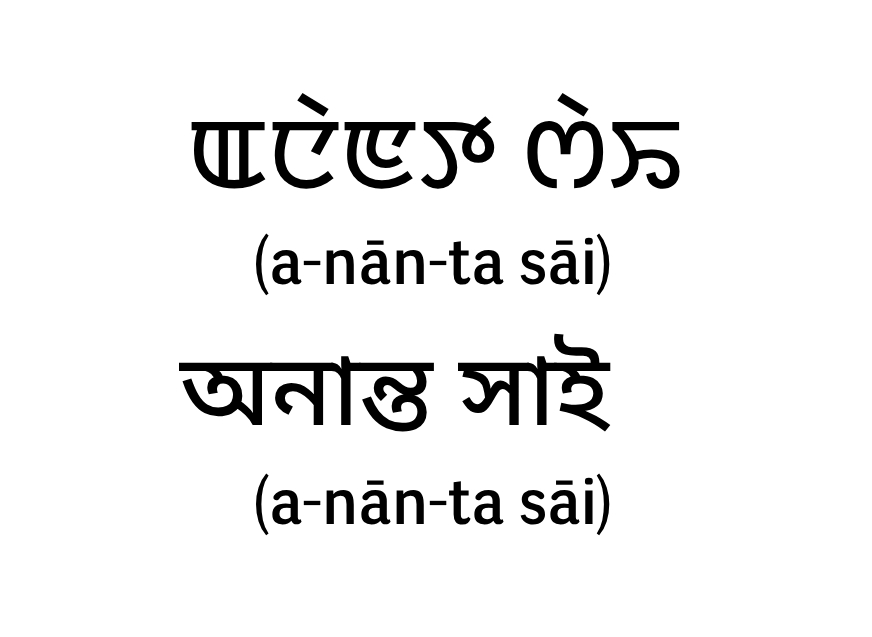
- Born: 29 August 1725; Kangleipak
- Died: Kangleipak
- Issue: Prince Khuching
Era name and dates
- Medieval Manipur: 18th century CE
Regnal name
- Mantri Ananta Sai
- House: Mantrimayum
- Dynasty: Ningthouja dynasty
- Father: Pamheiba
- Mother: Lairikyengbam Chanu Haripriya
- Religion: Hinduism
- Occupation: Minister of Medieval Manipur

Mantri Ananta Sai (alias Ananta Shai or Ananta Sain) was a Meitei prince of the Ningthouja dynasty of Medieval Manipur. He was an uncle of Gaurisiam and Bhagyachandra. He recomposed the lost royal chronicle of Manipur in 1780. He and his nephew, Bhagyachandra started the Heikru Hidongba festival after the installation of Lord Bijoy Govinda and Lord Shri Govinda.

== Background ==
Ananta Sai was the seventh son of King Pamheiba, born to his ninth queen, Lairikyengbam Chanu Haripriya. Pamheiba was expelled from the palace by his third son, Chitsai in 1748 and out of Manipur in 1750 due to jealousy.

== The Incident Regarding Bharatsai ==
After the evil Chitsai's treachery was found out, his younger brother, the great Bharatsai expelled him out of Manipur in 1752 after a slight squabble. However, he also conspired against his nephews, Gaurisiam and Bhagyachandra. Sangkoi Tapa (Bharatsai) ruled so poorly that the people started to turn against him. Ananta Sai, who was also the king's younger brother and nobleman, conspired against Bharatsai on behalf of his nephews.

One of Bharatsai's noblemen convinced him to get rid of his nephews. He initially refused, but after being pressed on, he made the decision to murder his nephews. After learning of this, Wayenbam Chanu Chakha Maring Loikhombi fled to the Huntung village and then the Maring village with her sons, Maramba (Gaurisiam) and Bhagyachandra. Ananta Sai could only put up with this at his own risk. On behalf of his nephews, Maramba and Bhagyachandra, Ananta Sai led his army against Bharat Sai.

Ananta Sai told his men:

"My elder brother Shyam Sai was a noble son of a worthy father. He was also the natural successor to the throne. As misfortune would have it, he died without ascending the throne. God will be pleased if his sons Gourshyam (Gaurisiam) and Bhagyachandra are installed to the throne. Besides, their legitimate title is unquestionable. I will place them on the throne alternatively for a period of five years."

Ananta Sai then dethroned Bharatsai and made Maramba the king, and Bhagyachandra the crown prince. As soon as Maramba ascended the throne in October 1753, he expelled Bharatsai to Inwa (Ava). He then ruled with his younger brother, Bhagyachandra alternately for 5 years.

== Tenure ==
Ananta Sai was the Prime Minister of his nephew, Bhagyachandra. Before Maramba died, he sent Ananta Sai and Jagannath Das to meet Harry Verelst in Chittagong in September 1763. They went to finalize the treaty terms of the Anglo-Manipuri pact in 1762. The treaty then was confirmed on behalf of Maramba.

== Contributions to religious aspects ==
In 1779, when Bhagyachandra started the Ras Leela dance, Ananta Sai and few others specialised it with unique compositions.

In November 1783, Ananta Sai, who was the Nongthonba (revenue collector), inaugurated a pond, which came to be known as Mantri Pukhri (lit. 'Minister's Pond').

In December 1788, Bhagyachandra established the idols of Shri Bijoy Govindajee. The idol was then worshipped by Ananta Sai who honored it with a brick temple. The Shri Govindajee temple was under the care of Bhagyachandra, while the Shri Bijoy Govindajee was under the care of Ananta Sai.

== Later descendants ==
Prince Ananta Sai is the patriarch of the Mantrimayum (House of Minister) family of the extended royal family of Manipur. His descendants are responsible for Shri Bijoy Govinda worship and the annual Heikru Hidongba festival. The temple of Shri Bijoy Govinda is now managed by the descendants of Prince Ananta Sai.

== See also ==
- Haricharan Sai

== Bibliography ==
- Gosvāmī, Dvijendranārāẏaṇa (2002). Rajarshi Bhagya Chandra. Akkhar Publications. ISBN 978-81-86802-43-4.
- Somorjit Sana, Raj Kumar (2010). The Chronology of Meetei Monarchs: From 1666 CE to 1850 CE. Waikhom Ananda Meetei. ISBN 978-81-8465-210-9.
- Saroj Nalini Arambam Parratt (2005). The Court Chronicle of the Kings of Manipur: Volume 1. Routledge – via Archive.com.
