= Chitsai =

King of Manipur from 1748 to 1752

- Meitei Ningthou

King of Manipur
- Reign: 1748 CE - 1752 CE
- Coronation: 1748 CE
- Predecessor: Pamheiba
- Successor: Bharatsai
- Born: 6th January 1720
- House: Ningthouja dynasty
- Father: Pamheiba
- Mother: Wayenbam Chanu Gomati
- Religion: Hinduism

Chitsai (alias Ajit Sai) (Note: In the names of the sons of King Pamheiba, "Sai" also means "Shah".) was a Meitei king of the Ningthouja dynasty of Medieval Manipur from 1748 to 1752. After he became the king, he banished his father, Pamheiba out of the royal palace.

== Background ==
Chitsai was the third son of King Pamheiba born by his reigning queen, Wayenbam Chanu Gomati. The first son born to Pamheiba, Syam Sai (Shamsai/Shyamjai), was the true heir to the throne, but instead, Chitsai was made the king by his father because the latter had promised Chitsai's mother, who was a married woman, that the first son born to her will ascend the throne of Manipur.

Wayenbam Chanu Gomati was the 4th head queen of Pamheiba who gave birth to many sons. She reigned until the abdication of Pamheiba in 1748.

== Reign ==
Chitsai was made the king in 1748 by his father Pamheiba after the latter abdicated. However, after Chitsai became the king, he expelled his father out of the palace in 1748, and out of Manipur in 1750 because of jealousy. So Pamheiba went to Kingdom of Ava (Burma) where his niece, Sicha was a queen, and stayed there for 1 year.

== Murder of Pamheiba and dethronement ==
Pamheiba was planning for a revenge and re-enter Manipur. After a year, he and his eldest son, Shyamjai, along with 15 noblemen planned to re-enter Manipur. However, when Chitsai heard this news, with the rumours of Shyamjai being placed on the throne of Manipur by his father, he sent his men to kill his father (and the others). Pamheiba and his 15 noblemen were killed by his youngest son, Tolentomba, and other men sent by Chitsai. It is unclear whether Shyamjai was killed by Chitsai or drowned in the Ningthi River.

When Chitsai's treachery was finally discovered, in 1752, Chitsai was dethroned and expelled by his younger brother, Bharatsai.

== Conflict with Bhagyachandra ==
Bhagyachandra was a nephew of Chitsai, and the second son of Shyamjai who ascended the throne in 1759 CE. However, his reign became insecure because of the intrigues of Chitsai. At that time, Chitsai was expelled to Cachar and having heard about the devastation in Manipur, he took the change to ask the English help for his re-installation on the throne of Manipur.

In 1762, Maramba (Gaurisiam/Goura Shyam) ascended the throne again and tried many ways to save the kingdom. Having heard about Chitsai's plans, Bhagyachandra sent his own mission, via an envoy called Haridas Gossai, to Harry Verelst, the Chief of Chittagong. He informed the English official at Chittagong of the reasons behind Chitsai's removal from the Manipur throne. After reviewing the Manipur case, the English officials rejected the case of Chitsai. The English officials made the decision to assist Bhagyachandra in regaining the Manipur throne.

Additionally, Haridas Gossai stated that Manipur offered prospects for trade with China. On 14th September 1762, Verelst and Haridas Gossai signed a formal treaty on behalf of Bhagyachandra. Later in 1763, Maramba died, allowing Bhagyachandra to ascend the throne for the 2nd time. The final treaty with the English was signed on 11th September 1763 on behalf of Gourshah (Maramba).

In 1764, Hsinbyushin, the king of Burma, invaded Manipur with Chitsai's assistance. As a result, Bhagyachandra fled to Ahom (modern-day Assam), where he was protected by Rajeshwar Singha (Suremphaa), the Ahom king. Following this, Chitsai informed the Ahom king that the person he was providing refuge to was a fraud. Bhagyachandra was given a test by the Ahom king to prove himself.

After a test of faith, many expeditions were undertaken by the Ahom king to Manipur. Finally in 1773, Bhagyachandra was reinstalled as the King of Manipur.

== See also ==
- Haricharan Sai
- Ahom expedition to Manipur
- Ananta Sai

== Bibliography ==
- Somorjit Sana, Rajkumar (2010). The Chronology of Meetei Monarchs: From 1666 CE to 1850 CE. Waikhom Ananda Meitei. ISBN 9788184652109.
- Sanajaoba, Naorem (1988). Manipur, Past and Present: The Heritage and Ordeals of a Civilization. Volume 4. Mittal Publications. ISBN 9788170998532.
- Banerjee, Anil Chandra (1946) [1943], The Eastern Frontier of British India, 1784–1826 (Second ed.), Calcutta: A. Mukherjee – via archive.org
  - Banerjee, Anil Chandra (1964) [1943]. The Eastern Frontier of British India, 1784–1826 (Third ed.). Calcutta: A. Mukherjee – via archive.org.
- Hanjabam, Shukhdeva Sharma; Koireng Singh, Aheibam (2022). Manipur-Myanmar Historical Connections. Concept Publishing Company. ISBN 9789354390784.
- Parratt, Saroj Nalini Arambam (2005). The Court Chronicle of the Kings of Manipur: 33-1763 CE. Routledge. ISBN 9780415344302.
- Parratt, Saroj Nalini Arambam (2009). The Court Chronicle of the Kings of Manipur: Volume 2, the Cheitharon Kumpapa. Cambridge University Press. ISBN 9788175968547.
- Cocks, S. W. (1919). A Short History of Burma. London: McMillan – via archive.org.
- Tarapot, Phanjoubam (2003). Bleeding Manipur. Har-Anand Publications. ISBN 9788124109021.

Preceded by Pamheiba	King of Manipur; 1748–1752	Succeeded by Maramba
