= Syam Sai =

Meitei royal

Syam Sai (also called Syam Shah and Khurai-Lakpa) (died 1751) was a Meitei royal. He was the son of Gharib Niwaz and the father of Bhagya Chandra. He was assassinated by his brother Chitsai in 1751 C.E.

== See also ==
- List of Meitei royals
- Manipur (princely state)
