= Raslila =

Divine dance of Radha Krishna with Gopis

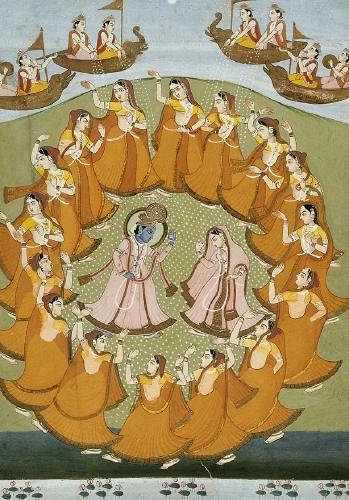
Krishna and Radha dancing the rasalila, a 19th-century painting, Rajasthan

The Raslila (Sanskrit: रासलीला, romanized: Rāsalīlā), also rendered the Rasalila, Rasleela, Krishna Leela, or the Ras dance, is part of a traditional story described in Hindu texts such as the Bhagavata Purana and Gita Govinda, where Krishna dances with Radha and the gopis of Braj. Rasalila has also been a popular theme for other India classical dances including Bharatanatyam, Odissi, Manipuri Raas Leela, Kuchipudi, and Kathak.

The Indian classical dance of Kathak and Manipuri rasalila are evolved from the rasalila of Braj. Kathak, also known as Natwari Nritya, was revived in the 1960s by the Kathak dancer, Uma Sharma.

== Etymology ==
The term raslila is derived from the Sanskrit words ras which means "nectar", "emotion" or "sweet taste" and lila meaning "act," "play" or "dance." Thus, it is more broadly defined as the "Dance of Divine Love" or "Sweet act of Krishna."

== Legend ==
The rasalila takes place one night when the gopis of Vrindavana, upon hearing the sound of Krishna's flute, sneak away from their households and families to the forest to dance with Krishna throughout the night, which Krishna supernaturally stretches to the length of one kalpa, a Hindu unit of time lasting approximately 4.32 billion years. In the Krishna Bhakti traditions, the rasalila is considered to be one most beautiful depiction of soulful love. In these traditions, romantic love between human beings in the material world is seen as a reflection of the soul's original, ecstatic spiritual love of Krishna, in his spiritual world, Goloka.

In the Bhagavata Purana it is stated that whoever faithfully hears or describes the rasalila attains Krishna's pure loving devotion (Suddha-bhakti). The rasalila is considered to be the "ultimate message" of the Bhagavata Purana. The story starts in Vraja, where Krishna is inspired to play music on his flute. Hearing the music, the gopis leave their homes and families and make it to Krishna. When they came closer, Krishna playfully disappears and reappears. Krishna talks about love and performs rasalila with each of the gopis, assuming numerous forms. The story ends with the gopis reluctantly going back to their homes after refreshing in a nearby river.

Graham Schweig observes that a closer reading of the story leads one to see the story as a symbol of "intense devotion to God" and not a "display of worldly lust". Verse 10.33.40 of the Bhagavata states that, "the person who has heard this story will attain high devotion to the Lord, and then, sobered, he will quickly throw off lust, the disease of the heart."

Schweig argues for an appreciation of the "unique vision" presented in the text in which God is "an adorable, eternally youthful cowherd boy who plays the flute and delights in amorous dalliance with his dearest devotees". Schweig compares the rasalila to the "Song of Songs". He argues that just as the Song of Solomon has been ascribed the highest status in relation to other books of the Bible by mystics of the Jewish and Christian traditions, the rasalila has been considered by Vaishnava traditions to be the "crown-jewel of all acts of God".

Just as a child plays at its own will with its reflection in a mirror, with the help of his Yogamaya, Krishna sported with the gopis, who are regarded to have been shadows of his own form. Krishna's yogamaya intensifies devotion because it causes devotees to forget his majesty and form an initimate connection.

== Performance ==
Rasalila has been a popular theme in Kathak, Bharatanatyam, Odissi, Manipuri, and Kuchipudi dance forms. Rasalila is a popular form of folk theatre in the regions of Mathura, Vrindavana in Uttar Pradesh, Nathdwara amongst various followers of Pushtimarg or the Vallabh sect and other sects in the regions of India. It is also seen in Gaudiya Vaishnavism in Nadia a district of West Bengal which is also known for Raas Utsava. Vanga Raas of Santipur is the main festival of this town, Nabadwip also has Shakta Raas.

The raslila is also observed as one of the State Festivals of Assam which usually is celebrated during late November or early December. During Raas Mahotsava, several thousand devotees visit the holy temples and satras of Assam every year. The Raas Mahotsav of Majuli, Nalbari and of Howly are noteworthy.

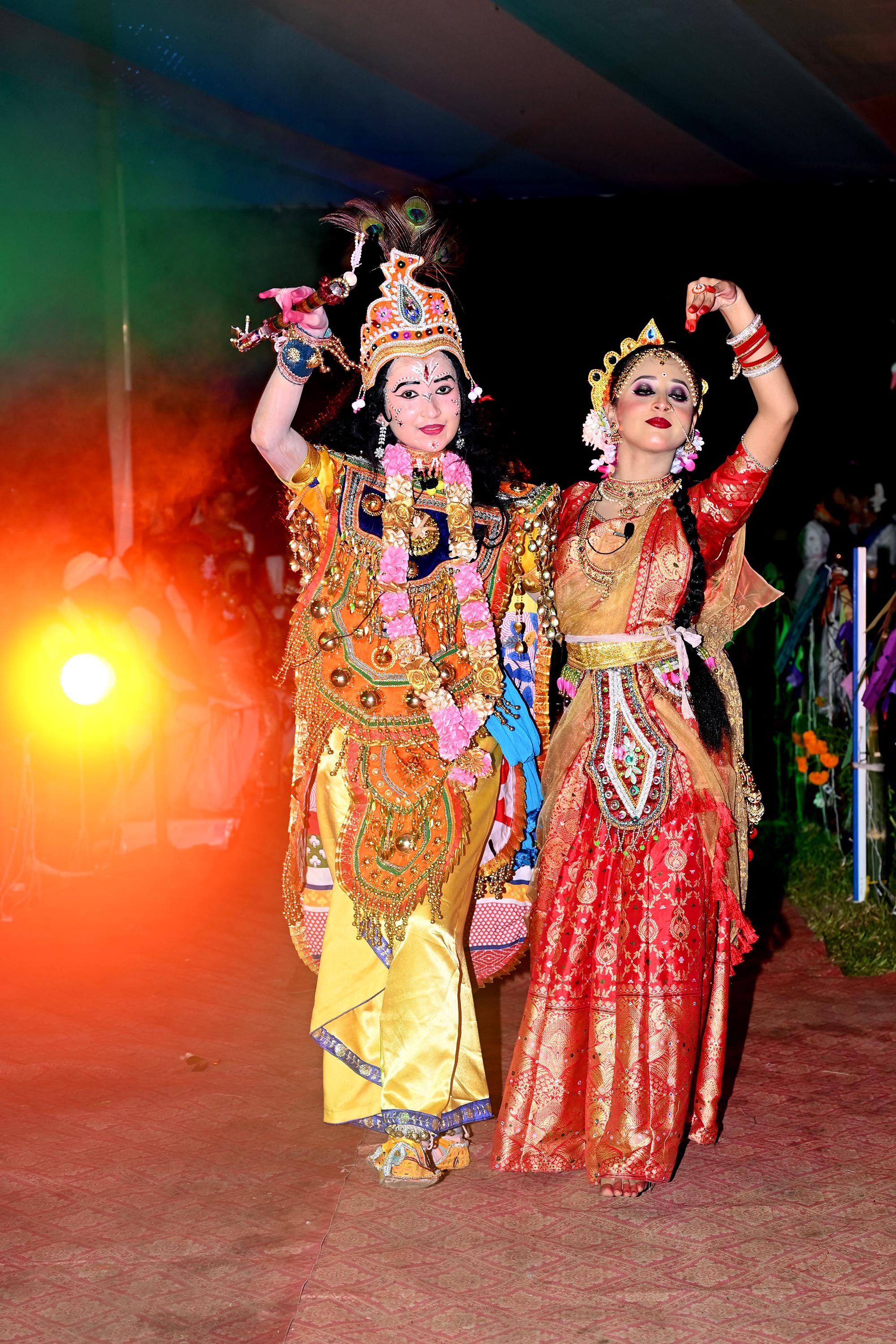
Krishna and Radha during Raslila in Assam

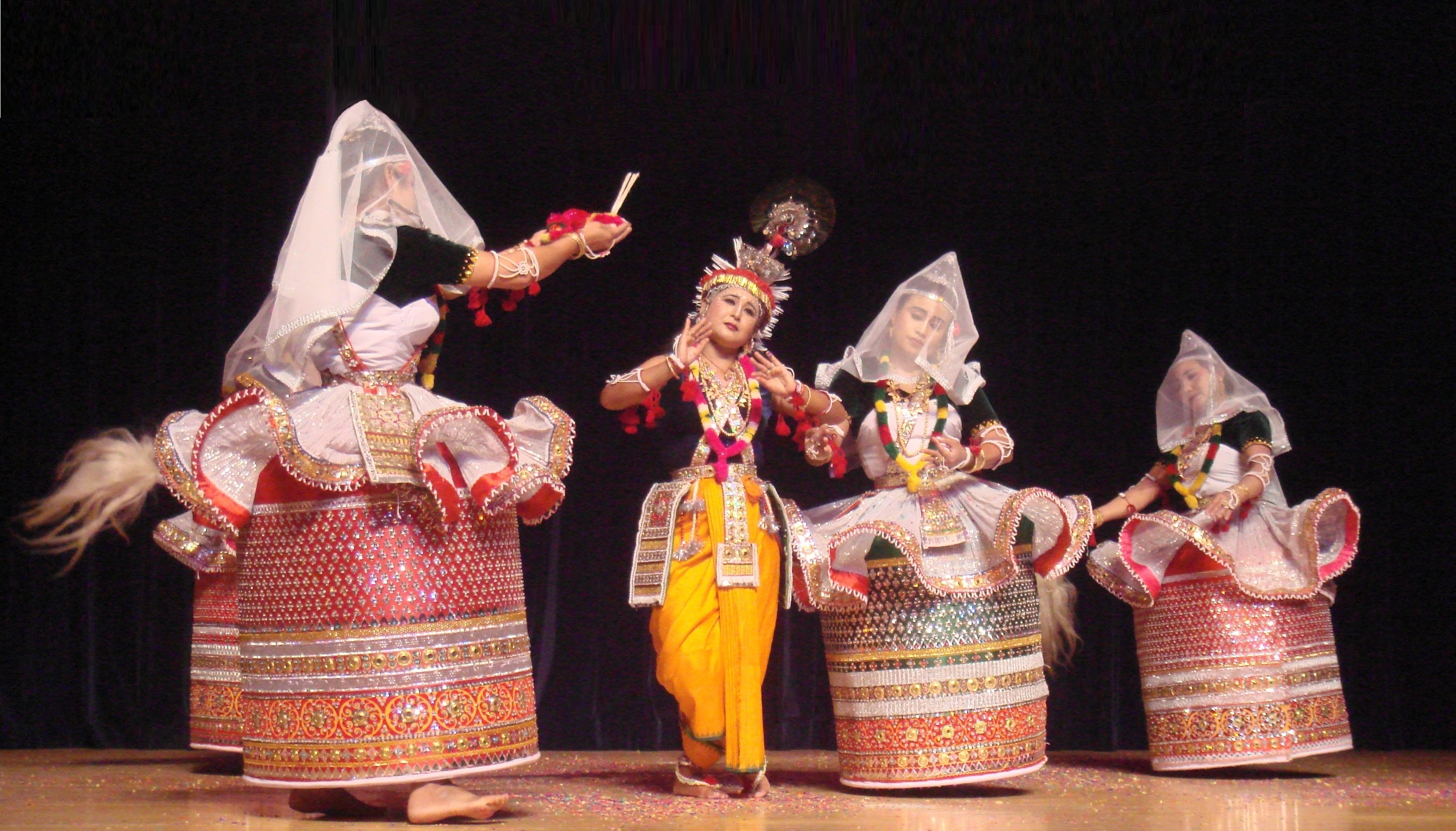
Raas Leela in Manipuri classical Indian dance style

In the tradition of Vaishnavism of Manipur rasa-lila is depicted within Manipuri classical Indian dance and revolves around the story of love between Krishna and Radha, his divine beloved. This form of dance was started by Bhagya Chandra in 1779 and in some parts of India is still performed every year on Krishna Janmashtami (the festival to celebrate Krishna's birthday). According to different traditions, the rasa-lila is performed either by boys and girls, or by girls only. The dance is performed holding dandi (sticks) and is often accompanied with folk songs and devotional music.

The traditional rasalila performances in Vrindavan are famous throughout the Vaishnava world as an experience of the spiritual world. Rasalila performance was started by Swami Sri Uddhavaghamanda Devacharya in the early 15th Century CE at Vamshivata in Vrindavan, Mathura. He was a prominent saint of the Nimbarka Sampradaya, and disciple of the Swami Sri Harivyasa Devacharya. The Vani literature of Vraja is the transcription of the songs that were heard by Swami Harivyasa Devacarya and his Guru, Swami Shri Shribhatta as they meditated on the Nitya Lila of Radha Krishna. These songs describe the eternal spiritual abode of Radha Krishna, the Sakhis and Nitya Vrindavana Dham - or Nikunja Dham.

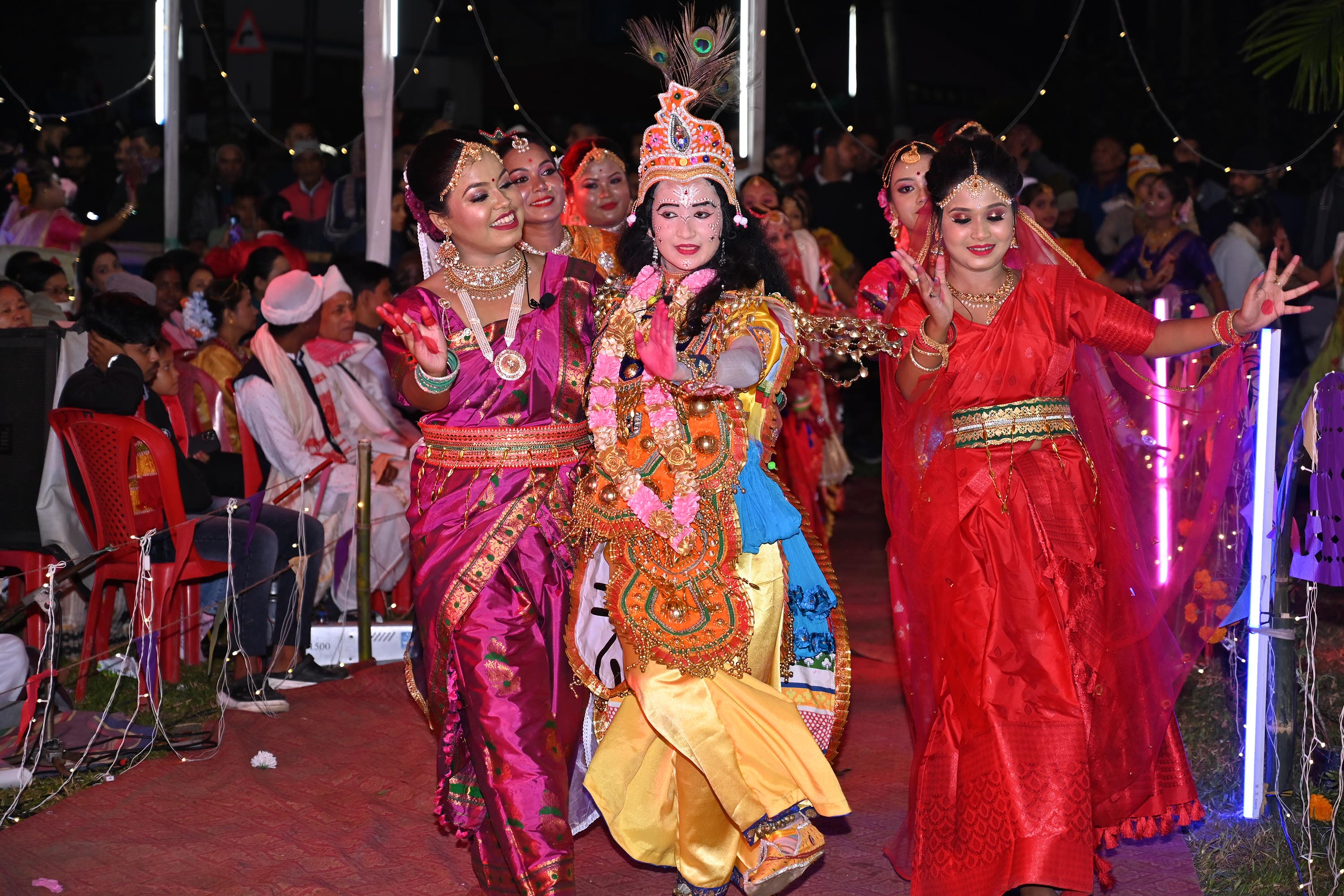
Radha & Krishna along with other gopis dance during the raas celebration in Nagaon district of Assam.

It became more prominent utsava in 16th and 17th century, when Mahaprabhu Shri Vallabhacharya and Vitthalanatha gusaiji made it more popular.

In the Vaishnavism tradition of Manipur, the Rasa Lila is depicted through classic Manipuri dance. It revolves around Krishna and the cowherd girls, narrating the divine love story of Krishna, (svayam bhagavan) and Radha, his beloved. This dance form was established by Bhagya Chandra in 1779, and is still performed annually in some parts of India during Krishna Janmashtami, the festival celebrating Krishna's birth. According to different traditions, the rasa-lila is performed either by boys and girls, or by boys only. The dance is performed holding dandi (sticks) and is often accompanied with folk songs and devotional music.

== Bibliography ==
- Dance of Divine Love: The rasalila of Krishna from the Bhagavata Purana, India's classic sacred love story, by Graham M. Schweig. Princeton University Press, Princeton, NJ; 2005 (ISBN 0-691-11446-3).
- Rasa - Love Relationships in Transcendence, by Swami B.V. Tripurari (ISBN 978-1-886069-10-7)
- Theatre and Religion on Krishna's Stage, by David Mason, New York: Palgrave, 2009
- "Essays on Indo-Aryan Mythology", by Narayan Aiyangar, 1898 (ISBN 1-104-83270-4) (ISBN 978-1-104-83270-4)
