= Manipuri Vaishnavism =

Regional variant of Vaishnavism sect of Hinduism in Manipur, India

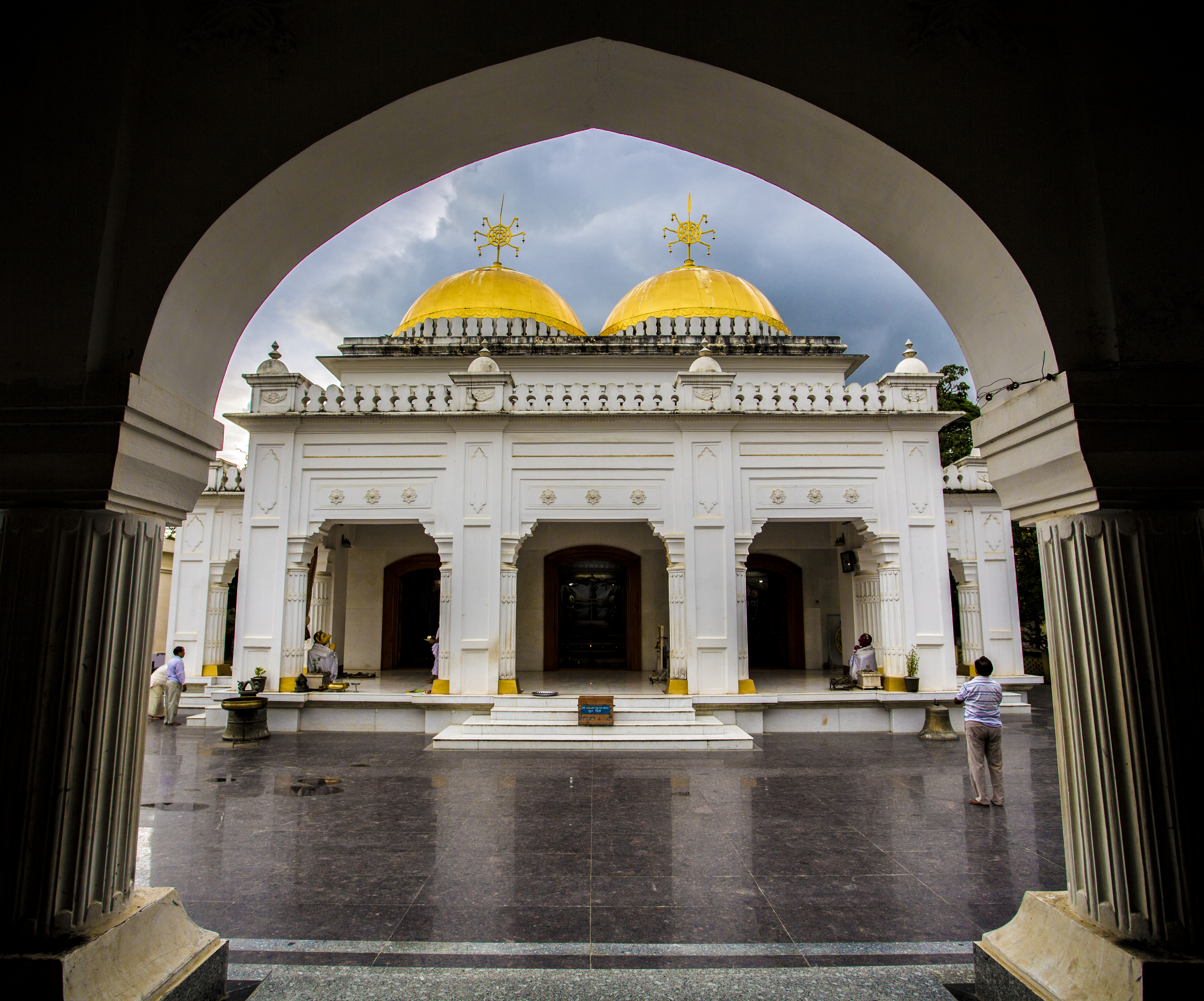
- Shree Govindajee Temple, Imphal, Manipur, India

Founder
- Rajarshi Bhagyachandra

Regions with significant populations
- Manipur and other northeast Indian states

Religions
- Hinduism

Scriptures
- Mahabharata, Bhagavad Gita, Bhagavata Purana

Languages
- Meitei language

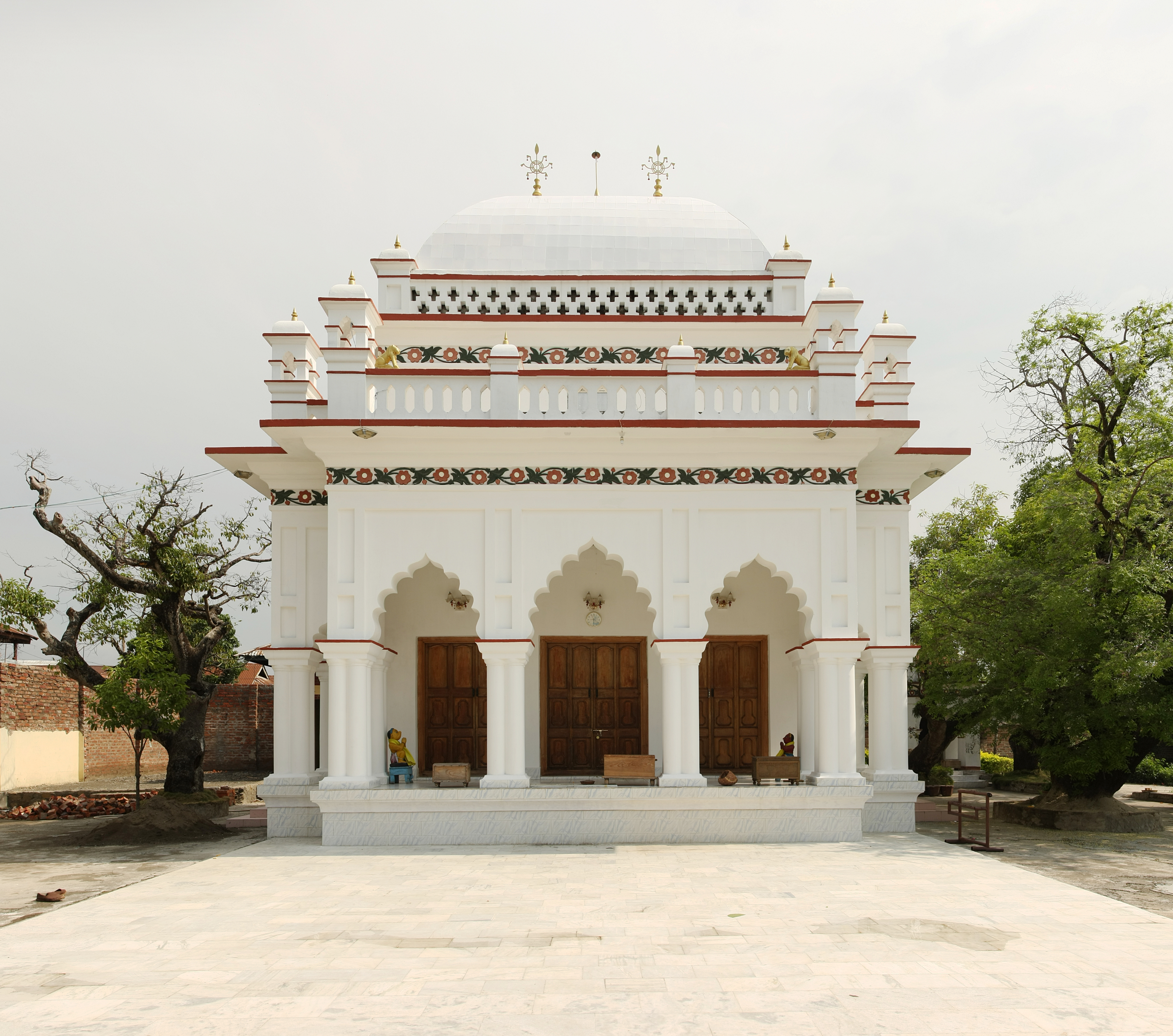
Gopinath Temple, Ningthoukhong, Manipur, India.

Manipuri Vaishnavism, also known as Meitei Vaishnavism, is a regional variant of Gaudiya Vaishnavism, a subsect of the Vaishnavism sect of Hinduism, with a culture-forming role in the north-eastern Indian state of Manipur. Manipuri Vaishnavas do not worship Krishna alone, but as Radha-Krishna. With the spread of Vaishnavism, the worship of Krishna and Radha became the dominant form in the Manipur region. With every village there having a thakur-ghat and a temple.

Historically, King Charairongba was the first ruler of Manipur kingdom to formally adopt Vaishnavism as his family religion, though he did enforce the faith to his subjects, and the reign of King Chandrakirti Singh was the "Golden Period of Vaishnavism" in the Manipur.

== Background ==
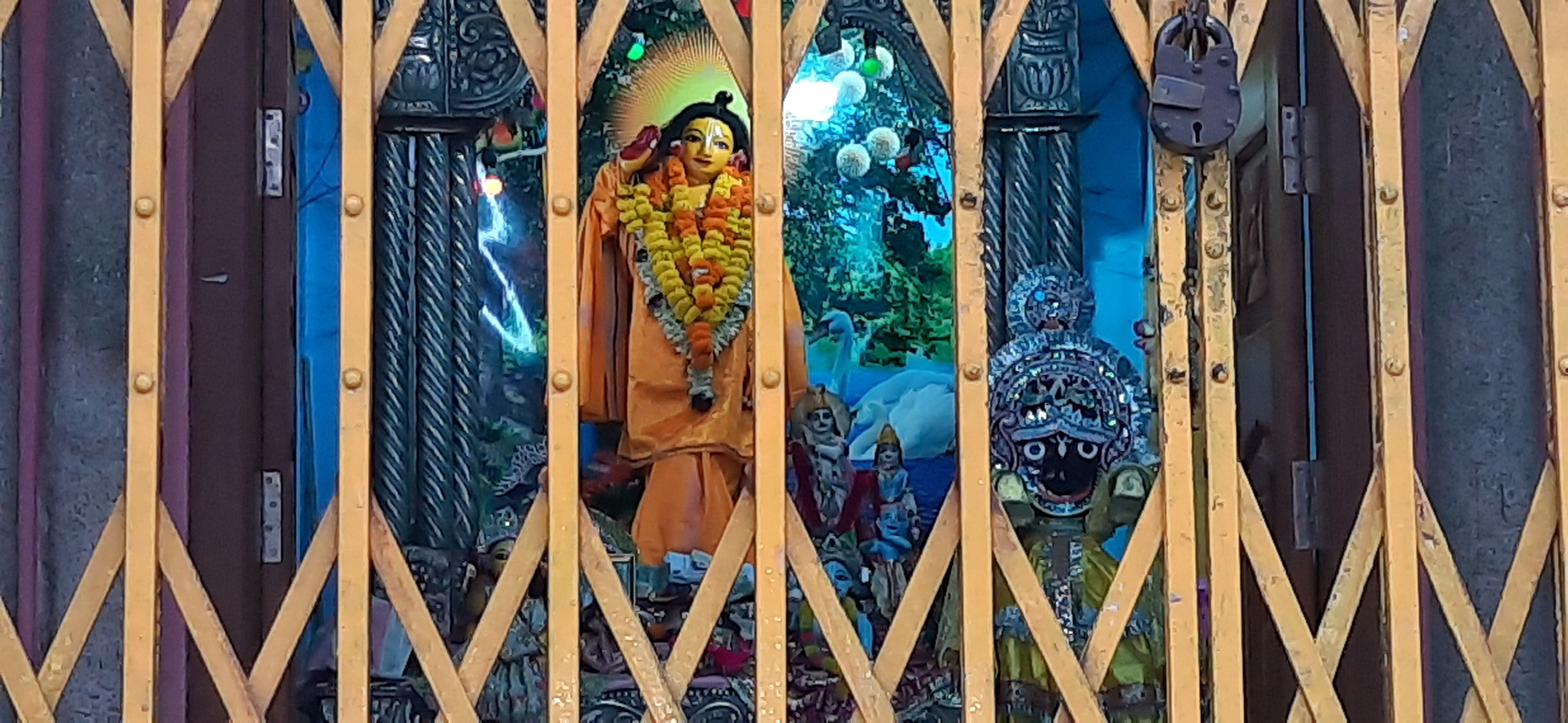
The idol of Chaitanya Mahaprabhu which was constructed in Manipur during the reign of Bhagyachandra & installed in a temple constructed in Nabadwip on 1794 by his daughter Sija Laiongbi aka Bimbamati

Vaishnavism in Manipur has an extended history. While there are records in the Puranas as to account of the pre-historic forms of Vaishnavism or Bhagavatism in the area of present state, the modern history of Vaishnava practices in Manipur started with a king of the Shan Kingdom of Pong gifting a murti of the Sudarshana Chakra (the celestial discus of Vishnu or Krishna) to Kyamaba, king of Manipur, so since the 1470s the kings of Manipur started worshiping Vishnu. Many Brahmin priests from the western areas of India, came to Manipur and settled there. The account of the arrival of Brahmins is found in the records of the book Bamon Khunthock. King Kayamba (1467–1523) built a Vishnu temple in Vishnupur, a notable architectural monument. In 1704 King Charairongba was initiated into Vaishnava tradition and since then Vaishnavism became the state religion. This consolidated the cultural contact with India even further. After a short period of Vaishnavite Ramaism penetration, Gaudiya Vaishnavism spread in the early 18th century, especially from beginning its second quarter. King Gharib Nawaz (Pamheiba) was ruling from 1709 to 1748 and he was initiated into Vaishnavism of Gaudiya tradition, by the Sylheti preacher Shantidas Gosai, a follower of Narottama Dasa. He practiced this religion for nearly twenty years. Preachers and pilgrims used to arrive in large numbers and cultural contact with the neighboring Ahom kingdom was maintained. It is believed that the wave of devotion that turned the entire kingdom Krishna conscious took place during the reign of Gharib Nawaz’s grandson Bhagyachandra.

=== Bhagyachandra ===
King Ching-Thang Khomba, also known as Bhagyachandra, was most devoted ruler and propagandist of Gaudiya Vaishnavism, under the influence of Narottama Dasa's disciples, and visited the Gaudiya holy site of Nabadwip. He ascended the throne in 1759; however, in 1762 the Burmese invaded Manipur, and the king, with his queen and a few attendants, sought refuge with their son-in-law, the Ahom king Rajeswar Singha, who was husband of Bhagyachandra's daughter Kuranganayani. The dispute over real identity of the king, called for a demonstration of supernatural powers, believed to be attributed to the king. It is believed that Bhagyachandra had a revelation from Krishna in a dream; based on this revelation, he committed himself to making worship of Govinda the state religion on return to power in Manipur. It is believed that the murti of Govinda was to be made of the specific sacred tree and carefully planned rasa-lila dances to be instituted in the kingdom, which was regained with the help of the Ahom army. On reinstating the throne, a Govinda idol was installed at the royal temple and regularly worshiped; later a Radha idol was installed and worshiped next to it.

== Impact of Gaudiya Vaishnavism ==
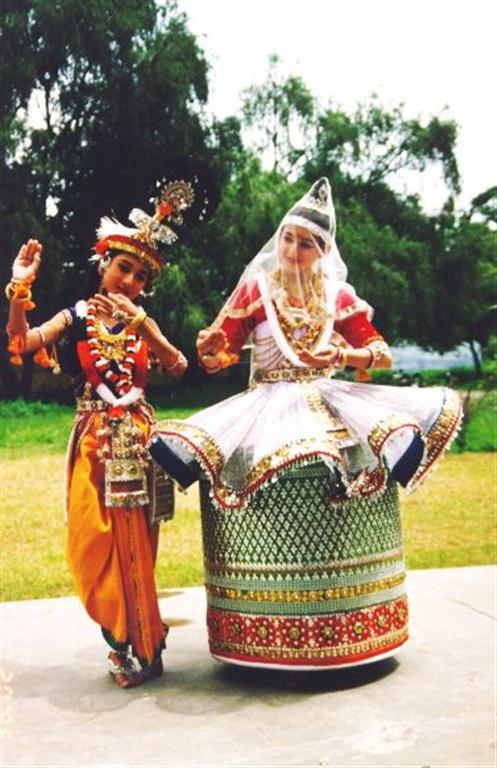
Artists depicting Radha Krishna's love story through the rasa-lila dance.

The Meiteis or Manipuris were initiated to the religion of Chaitanya during the middle of the 18th century. With a vast cultural changes during the then king Bhangyachandra, which include development of raslila dance drama of Manipuri Raas Leela dedicated to raslila of Krishna and gopis, which is well known to the world, development of the Bishnupriya Manipuri language & adaptation of Eastern Nagari script for writing the Meitei language the image of Manipuri society changed and evolved as a Hindu society. Various other literature of the Gaudiya sampradaya was translated and thoroughly studied. This also included chantings and sankirtana. Various other dance drama were also composed like gaura lila and six form of ras lila and performed in villages of Manipur. The Manipuri rasa-lila dance is evolved from dances of lai haraoba performed by maiba and maibi, priests and priestesses of traditional Meitei religious beliefs before Vaishnavism in Manipur. Rasa-lila and Manipuri Sankirtana or Nata Sankirtana became the important features of day to day life. In all rituals non-vegetarian food is completely prohibited.

Even though Krishnaism became a prominent part of Meitei religious beliefs, they never stopped worshipping the traditional deities. The older deities with similar concepts were equated with different other Hindu gods, like Nongpok Ningthou and Panthoibi with Shiva-Parvati. There are many temples in Imphal valley like Hiyangthang Lairembi Temple where the deity is worshipped in both Sanamahism and Vaishnavism way.

== See also ==
- Hinduism in Manipur
- Meitei Hindus
- Manipuri dance
- Chaitanya Mahaprabhu
- Bhaktisvarupa Damodara Swami

== Bibliography ==
- Singh, Kunj Bihari (2004) [1963]. "Manipur Vaishnavism: A Sociological Interpretation". In Rowena Robinson (ed.). Sociology of Religion in India. Themes in Indian Sociology, 3. New Delhi: Sage Publ. India. pp. 125–132. ISBN 0-7619-9781-4.
