= Khunjaoba =

King of Manipur from 1652 to 1666

- Meitei Ningthou

King of Manipur
- Reign: 1652–1666
- Coronation: 1652
- Predecessor: Khagemba
- Successor: Paikhomba
- Born: Khunchaopa; 1622
- Died: 1666
- House: Ningthouja dynasty
- Father: Khagemba
- Religion: Sanamahism

Khunjaoba (1622–1666) was a Meitei king of the Ningthouja dynasty of Medieval Manipur. He ruled from 1652 to 1666. Starting from the time of his father Khagemba, there were many events of Muslim migration and settlement. It continued till his time. He constructed canals and embankments around the Khwairamban marketplace.

== Conquests ==
In 1657, he defeated the leader of the Kabaw Valley. When he and his brother Tonaba confronted the Samjok king in 1652, the Kuyong tribes launched an invasion of the Meitei kingdom. Thus, Khunjaoba's queen Takhembi, along with her Thang Ta instructor Sarangcha and the wife of Khunjaoba's brother, Sanakhombi, readied themselves for battle and ultimately defeated the Kuyong tribes, driving them away.

Khunjaoba defeated the Samjok king twice in 1653 and 1659.

== Death of two family members ==
At that time, the leader of the Maram tribes failed to pay the annual tribute. To address this, he dispatched his younger brother Tonaba (the father of Paikhomba) along with Paikhomba's elder brother to gather the tribute. Nevertheless, the Maram chief murdered both Tonaba and Paikhomba's elder brother as retaliation for his father's death at the hands of Khagemba.

== Death ==
As a result of inaccurate accusations of conspiracy against the king, he terminated his marriage to Queen Takhembi in 1666 CE. Consequently, all five of her friends were executed. This led to their families rising up against the king, resulting in the deaths of Khunjaoba and his kin. The kingdom was left without a ruler for approximately a month until Paikhomba, the nephew of Khunjaoba, ascended to the throne in 1666 CE.
