= Chakpa Makhao Ngambi =

Burmese queen of Meitei royal family

- Tampha Wangamlon, (Note: "Tampha Wangamlon" or "Tamphasana" is a title often given to the eldest daughter of the Meetei king.) Awa-Leima
- Tenure: Queen Consort of the Toungoo dynasty
- Coronation: 1704
- Born: Kangleipak (Meitei for 'Manipur Kingdom')
- Died: Myanmar
- Consort: Toungoo dynasty
- Consort: Taninganway (Meitei: Chekong Leimaba/Tongdoi Leimaba) (Note: "Tongtoi Chekong Reimapa" — "Tongdoi/Tongtoi" means the Toungoo dynasty of Burma; "Chekong" means the Sagaing Region; "Leimapa/Leimaba/Reimapa" means the King or the Lord.)
- Issue: Mangtra Kentu Ngampa (Kendu Ngamba); Dibouti
Names
- Tampha Wangamlon Sicha Chakpa Makhao Ngambi
- House: Ningthouja dynasty (by birth); Toungoo dynasty (by marriage)
- Dynasty: Ningthouja dynasty (by birth); Toungoo dynasty (by marriage)
- Father: either Prince Tonsen Ngampa or King Charairongba (Note: It's disputed whether the Meitei King Charairongba is her father or brother. For further details, please see #Family.)
- Mother: Khoiyoiron Ngaikhom Ngampi
- Religion: Meitei religion
- Occupation: Queen of Myanmar (Burma), Princess of Kangleipak (Manipur)

Chakpa Makhao Ngambi was the Burmese queen of Toungoo dynasty of Kingdom of Ava (modern day Upper Burma) and the Meitei princess of Ningthouja dynasty of Kangleipak (Manipur Kingdom). She was the Queen consort of King Taninganway (Meitei: Chekong Leimaba/Tongdoi Leimaba) of Myanmar, until her stepping down from the status of chief queen consort after having a son. By birth, she was a first-degree relative of King Charairongba of Manipur Kingdom and a second-degree relative of King Pamheiba Garib Niwaj, (Note: Since it's disputed whether Charairongba is the father or brother of Princess Chakpa Makhao Ngambi, it is also disputed whether Charairongba's son, Pamheiba Garib Niwaj is her brother or nephew. Pamheiba's mention in relation to the princess is important because Pamheiba waged a war against Burma, to take revenge on the insult she suffered.) Charairongba's successor. Her abdication from the Burmese throne caused a long time international conflict between the Meiteis (Ningthouja dynasty) and the Bamars (Toungoo dynasty).

== Family ==
The parents of princess Chakpa Makhao Ngambi (Meitei: ꯆꯛꯄ ꯃꯈꯥꯎ ꯉꯝꯕꯤ) are opined by some scholars to be Meitei prince Tonsen Ngampa (Meitei: ꯇꯣꯟꯁꯦꯟ ꯉꯝꯄ) and his wife Ngangpam Chanu Ngaikhom Ngampi (Meitei: ꯉꯥꯡꯄꯝ ꯆꯅꯨ ꯉꯥꯏꯈꯣꯝ ꯉꯝꯄꯤ). Contrary to this fact, noblemen in the court of King Pamheiba, namely "Aroi Laishrancha" (Meitei: ꯑꯔꯣꯏ ꯂꯥꯏꯁ꯭ꯔꯟꯆꯥ/ꯂꯥꯏꯁ꯭ꯔꯝꯆꯥ) and "Atibar Yumnancha" (Meitei: ꯑꯥꯇꯤꯕꯥꯔ ꯌꯨꯝꯅꯥꯝꯆꯥ) wrote the "Samsok Ngampa" (Meitei: ꯁꯝꯁꯣꯛ ꯉꯝꯕ), which mentioned that princess Sicha Chakpa Makhao Ngambi was born to Khoiyoiron Ngaikhom Ngampi, mother of Tupi Charairongpa. King Charairongpa addressed Sicha Chakpa Makhao Ngampi as "Yimom" (a Meitei language term for both daughter and younger sister). Pamheipa, son of Charairongpa, used the term Yimanlon (Meitei for 'aunt') to address princess Chakpa Makhao Ngambi.

== Marriage ==
=== Proposal ===
On 18 January 1703 AD, (Note: In some books, it's wrongly written as 1723 AD.) two Burmese ambassadors named "Senpi Mayangkong" (Meitei: ꯁꯦꯟꯄꯤ ꯃꯌꯥꯡꯀꯣꯡ) and "Lousingpa Aawa Tunglacha" (Meitei: ꯂꯧꯁꯤꯡꯄ ꯑꯋꯥ ꯇꯨꯡꯂꯥꯆꯥ) came to the court of Meitei King Charairongba carrying a marriage proposal from Taninganway, the Burmese King Tongdoi Chekong Leimapa (Meitei for 'King of the Toungoo dynasty').

"The year of Arampa Khunchao 1624 Kum Sak... Thursday, the 1st of Phairen (18th January 1703 CE) the envoy from the King of Awa' arrived to ask for the hand of a Reima in marriage."

— Cheitharol Kumbaba, p. 64

The "Samsok Ngampa" (Meitei: ꯁꯝꯁꯣꯛ ꯉꯝꯄ) text mentioned that the Burmese ambassadors presented to Meitei king Charairongba (Meitei: ꯆꯔꯥꯏꯔꯣꯡꯕ) a large quantity of gold, bronze, silver, lead, plates, colorful items of cloths as gifts for the marriage proposal.

=== Conditions ===
King Charairongpa, all the members of the royal council and his ministers had a long discussion regarding the Burmese King's formal proposal. Later, Charairongba agreed the proposal on the following conditions:

1. Meitei princess Chakpa Makhao Ngambi should be enthroned as the Queen of Kingdom of Awa.
2. the former tributary tribes subject to the Meitei people, namely Pungpun, Kamu, Chirang, Kharo, Ting Yitsa, Maru Kondong and Loipi Tarao Khundon, should pay tributes to the Meitei King.

The Burmese king agreed to the conditions.

=== Wedding ===
Chakpa Makhao Ngambi was escorted by Charairongpa up to the Ningthi River (Meitei: ꯅꯤꯡꯊꯤ ꯇꯨꯔꯦꯜ). The wedding ceremony took place at Ava kingdom. After the marriage, she ascended the Phampan (Meitei for 'throne') of Awa kingdom. She was proclaimed as the head queen of the Burmese kingdom. The event of escorting the princess by Meitei king to Burma took place in between May and December 1704 AD.

== Abdication ==
Some time later after Chakpa Makhao Ngambi (Meitei: ꯆꯛꯄ ꯃꯈꯥꯎ ꯉꯝꯕꯤ) gave birth to a son named "Mangtra Kentu Ngampa" (Meitei: ꯃꯪꯇ꯭ꯔ ꯀꯦꯟꯇꯨ ꯉꯝꯄ), her husband, the King of Burma abdicated her position from being the chief queen of the kingdom. The news was brought to Meitei King Charairongpa, by a subject to the princess named "Pukhran Wapihaipa" (Meitei: ꯄꯨꯈ꯭ꯔꯟ ꯋꯥꯄꯤꯍꯥꯏꯄ). Consequently, Charairongba held a grand assembly in the Kangla (Meitei: ꯀꯪꯂꯥ). After a long discussion, they declared a war against Burma, to revenge on the insult to the Meitei princess. Eventually, a war broke out between the two kingdoms. Starting from the reign of Charairongba, the conflict continued till the reign of King Pamheiba (Meitei: ꯄꯥꯝꯍꯩꯕ).

When Charairongba was in his dying bed, he told his son Pamheiba, regarding the revenge on the insult to princess Chakpa Makhao Ngambi, as follows:

"Lairen Yipari, I have received the news of my sister Sicha Chakpa Makhou Ngampi being insulted in the capital of Khamaran (Burma)... Besides the king of Aawa Tongtoi does not return me my tributary Tarao Khundon Manin Naipa. For these reasons, I took my oath in front of my people at Kangla to fight with the King of Awa with sword."

== In Meitei literature ==
The Samsok Ngamba text, written by Laisram Aroi and Yumnam Atibar, describes the agony of princess Chakpa Makhao Ngambi on her way to the unknown kingdom for marriage with the old aged king of Burma. After going on the way for a long distance by crossing many hill and mountain ranges, the princess stopped at the hilltop of "Loukeirao" and wished to see her relative, the Meitei King Charairongba for the last time. Despite being consoled by Charairongba, she never stopped weeping, standing on the high slope of the mountain and looking down on the Imphal Valley. Her sorrowful uttering to herself is described as follows:

"I, this Meetei princess, have been removed from my parents and brothers from this day. I have left behind a long distance and the dark nights have taken me farther away from my native land."

— Samsok Ngampa

== In popular culture ==
The "Iramdam Manipur Artistes' Association", on the occasion of the 22nd Bharat Rang Mahotsav 2023, organised by the National School of Drama, presented a Shumang Kumhei genre Meitei language theatrical production, titled "Chakpa Makhao Ngambi", based on the historical figure of the same name. The same theatrical play was released in December, 2014 by the same production house in the Chadrakriti Auditorium in Palace Compound, Imphal, as well as in Vasanth Nagar, Bangalore.

== See also ==
- Kuranganayani
