= Paikhomba =

King of Manipur from 1666 to 1697

- Meitei Ningthou

King of Manipur
- Reign: 1666–1697
- Predecessor: Khunjaoba
- Successor: Charairongba
- Born: Poiteikhunkhomba; 1645
- Died: 1697
- Spouse: Ingallei, Haobam Chanu Ponglenkhombee
- House: Ningthouja dynasty
- Father: Tonaba
- Religion: Sanamahism

Paikhomba (1645–1697) was a Meitei king belonging to the Ningthouja dynasty of Medieval Manipur. He ruled from 1666 until his death in 1697. He is recognized for retrieving his father's skull from the village of Maram by concealing his identity and posing as an ordinary person. The Maram tribal chief raised him, and eventually, with the assistance of the chief's daughter, Ingallei, he obtained both his father's and his elder brother's skulls.

Ingallei was married to Paikhomba, but their couple life ended very quickly in sadness and separation.

During his time, trade with the neighbouring kingdoms reached its peak. The Kabos invaded the Meitei kingdom during his time in 1692 but were unsuccessful. They were driven back to the banks of the Chindwin by Paikhomba.

After his son died of smallpox in 1672, Paikhomba took in his nephew Chairairongba as his future successor.
