= Bharatsai =

King of Manipur from 1752 CE to 1753 CE

Bharat Sai
- Meitei Ningthou

King of Manipur
- Reign: 1752 CE - 1753 CE
- Coronation: 1752 CE
- Predecessor: Chitsai
- Successor: Maramba
- Born: 11 January 1728
- Died: 1753 (aged 24–25); Ava
Names
- Meidingu Sangkoi Taba Bharat Sai
- Name in Meitei script: ꯁꯪꯀꯣꯢ ꯇꯥꯕ
- House: Ningthouja dynasty
- Father: Pamheiba
- Mother: Wayenbam Chanu Gomati
- Religion: Hinduism

Bharat Sai, also known as Sangkoi Tapa, was a Meitei king of the Ningthouja dynasty of Medieval Manipur from 1752 to 1753. He became king after banishing his brother Chitsai after his treachery was found out.

== Background ==
Bharat Sai was the fourth son of King Pamheiba born by his reigning Queen, Wayenbam Chanu Gomati. Bharat Sai's elder brother Chitsai was the third son and was offered the throne of the kingdom by his father due to a promise the latter made to the reigning queen. However, as soon as Bharat Sai's brother, Chitsai ascended the throne, he expelled his father Pamheiba in 1748 from the palace.

Wayenbam Chanu Gomati was the 4th head queen of Pamheiba. She reigned until the abdication of Pamheiba in 1748. Bharatsai married a maiden of the Oinam family.

== Reign ==
Bharat Sai, with the approval of the people, expelled his brother Chitsai after the latter's treachery was found out, and became the king of Manipur. However, Bharat Sai also conspired against Shyamjai Khurailakpa's two sons, Maramba and Bhagyachandra. According to the Garibniwaz Charit, Sangkoiba (Bharat Sai) ruled so poorly that the people turned against him. One of the king's noblemen and brother, Ananta Sai, conspired against him on behalf of his nephews.

One of Bharatsai's noblemen convinced him to get rid of his nephews. He initially refused, but after being pressed on, he made the decision to murder his nephews. After learning of this, Wayenbam Chanu Chakha Maring Loikhombi fled to the Huntung village and then the Maring village with her sons, Maramba and Bhagyachandra. Ananta Sai could only put up with this at his own risk. On behalf of his nephews, Maramba and Bhagyachandra, Ananta Sai led his army against Bharat Sai.

=== Dethronement ===
In October 1753, Meidingu Maramba ascended the throne of Manipur and expelled his uncle Bharatsai to Ava (Burma). Maramba was disabled so, he ruled alternately with his younger brother Bhagyachandra for 5 years each.

== Bibliography ==
- Banerjee, Anil Chandra (1946) [1943]. The Eastern Frontier of British India, 1784–1826 (Second ed.). Calcutta: A. Mukherjee – via archive.org.
  - Banerjee, Anil Chandra (1964) [1943]. The Eastern Frontier of British India, 1784–1826 (Third ed.). Calcutta: A. Mukherjee – via archive.org.
- Hanjabam, Shukhdeva Sharma; Koireng Singh, Aheibam (2022). Manipur-Myanmar Historical Connections. Concept Publishing Company. ISBN 9789354390784.
- Somorjit Sana, Rajkumar (2010). The Chronology of Meetei Monarchs: From 1666 CE to 1850 CE. Waikhom Ananda Meitei. ISBN 9788184652109.
- Tarapot, Phanjoubam (2003). Bleeding Manipur. Har-Anand Publications. ISBN 9788124109021.
