= Charairongba =

King of Manipur from 1697 to 1709

- Eningthou Ningthem Charairongba

King of Manipur
- Reign: 1697–1709
- Coronation: 1698
- Predecessor: Paikhomba
- Successor: Pamheiba
- Born: 20 May 1673
- Died: 1709 (aged 35–36)
- Spouse: 4
- Issue: 5 including Pamheiba
Names
- Senbi Tekhao Lanthaba
- House: Ningthouja dynasty
- Father: Tonsen Ngamba
- Mother: Ngangbam Chanu Ngaikhong Ngambi
- Religion: Sanamahism (former); Vaishnavite Hindu (later)

Charairongba (20 May 1673 – 1709; Meitei: ꯆꯔꯥꯢꯔꯣꯡꯕ, romanized: Cha-raai-rong-ba), known in Ancient Manipuri as Chalailongpa (Meitei: ꯆꯂꯥꯢꯂꯣꯡꯄꯥ, romanized: Cha-laai-long-paa), was a Meitei king of the Ningthouja dynasty of Medieval Manipur. He ruled from 1697 to 1709.

== Background ==
Charairongba was born on 20 May 1673 as the son of Prince Tonsen Ngamba (Note: Spelled as "Tonsen Ngampa" in Old Manipuri.) (Meitei: ꯇꯣꯟꯁꯦꯟ ꯉꯝꯕ) and Meitei-Reima Ngangbam Chanu Ngaikhong Ngambi (Note: Spelled as "Ngangpam Chanu Ngaikhong Ngampi" in Old Manipuri.) (Meitei: ꯃꯩꯇꯩ ꯔꯩꯃ ꯉꯥꯡꯕꯝ ꯆꯅꯨ ꯉꯥꯢꯈꯣꯡ ꯉꯝꯕꯤ). Prince Tonsen Ngamba was the younger brother of King Paikhomba. He died before his elder brother. As Paikhomba did not have any heirs, his nephew Charairongba succeeded him in 1697 at the age of twenty-five, and was crowned king in 1698. He was well aware of the evolving situations in the Kabaw Valley and the neighboring Ava Kingdom.

Charairongba had four consorts, namely, 1) Heiwam Chanu, 2) Satpam (Sapam) Nungthin Chaipi, 3) Hicham Nongthonpam Chanu Sengoirempi, 4) Thangcham Chanu Thapa Ngampi. Out of all of them, the first consort did not have any child. From the three other consorts, Charairongba had five sons, namely, 1) Pamheiba (later Gharib Niwaz, 2) Loiyamba (Sana Keithel Taba), 3) Khampamba (alias Kongyamba), 4) Khamlang Pamsaba, and 5) Mungyamba. Sapam Chanu Nungthin Chaipi and Heiwam Chanu had already died before Charairongba became the king.

== Arrival of Brahmins ==
During the rule of Charairongba, the ancestors of various Brahmin families settled in Manipur. The Brahmin families are: (1) Guru Aribam, (2) Lai-mayum, (3) Laipubam, (4) Hangoibam, (5) Hazari-mayum, (6) Manohar-mayum, (7) Mathurabasi-mayum, (8) Lai-mayum-Anoubam, and (9) Choudhuri mayum. The forebears of these Brahmin families originated from the following places: (1) Shweta Ganga in Puri (Orissa), (2) Tripura, (3) Kanchan Nagar (possibly in Orissa), (4) Mathura (Uttar Pradesh), (5) Krishna Nagar (West Bengal), (6) Gambhila Nagar (West Bengal), (7) Mathura (Uttar Pradesh), (8) Tripura, and (9) Utkal (Orissa).

== Conversion to Vaishnavism ==
King Charairongba was the first Manipuri king to be initiated into Vaishnavism through a devoted Brahmin called Krishnacharya (also known as Rai Vanamali) who came to Manipur with some of his followers from Shweta Ganga in Puri, Odisha in the month of Mera in 1703. On the 5th of Sajibu month, the king of Manipur was formally initiated into Vaishnavism by the Brahmin. Since Rai Vanamali was the guru (preceptor) of Charairongba, his descendants came to be known as Guru Aribams (family of the old guru). Charairongba also adopted the sanskritized name, Pitambar Singh. He built temples for the worship of Radha and Krishna.

However, even if Charairongba initiated into Vaishnavism himself, he did not attempt to impose Hinduism as the state religion neither did he neglect traditional religious worships. So, Hinduism became limited to the royals and nobility.

== Planned invasion of Burma and death ==
In 1704, Charairongba married off his sister Chakpa Makhao Ngambi to the Burmese king Sanay Min. (Note: It's disputed whether King Charairongba is her father or brother. For more information, see Chakpa Makhao Ngambi#Family) However, when she gave birth to a son, the Burmese king removed her from the position of chief queen. When the news reached the Manipuri king, Charairongba was enraged and heartbroken. Charairongba then organised a gathering in Kangla. Following a lengthy discussion, the court declared war on Burma in retaliation for the insult to the Meitei princess. Eventually, war broke out between the two kingdoms. However, the Meitei king was struck by lightning, and on his deathbed, he directed his son Pamheiba to invade and devastate Myanmar for the mistreatment of his sister/daughter. The struggle lasted from the reign of Charairongba until the reign of King Pamheiba.

== Contributions to Meitei literature ==
Meitei King Charairongba is also known for being a writer. He is best known for authoring the text named "Leiron". The Leiron is a Meitei language account of flowers bearing testimonies to the loves of nature and appreciations of its beauty by the ancient Meitei people of Kangleipak (Meitei for 'Manipur')). In the literary works, king Charairongba is described as a king with a glorious reign over ten tributary kings. He was also traditionally believed to be an incarnation of King Nongda Lairen Pakhangba, the first able ruler of the Ningthouja dynasty.

=== Leiron ===
The "Leiron" (Meitei: ꯂꯩꯔꯣꯟ, lit. 'the account of flowers') written by Charairongba quotes the beauties of nature, among which the following is one of them:

Come spring and the first rumble of the approaching monsoon has been heard in the distance. Before long will the rivers flow with turbulent currents and it is the time of the year when Poireiton accompanied by Leinaotabi made his journey to earth. The hill glades now look velvety green and refreshingly beautiful with new sprouts growing in thick clusters and the blades of grass entwining with one another. The orchids begin to play with the gentle breeze. Domestic birds are flying out in search of new fruit. The young man eager to meet his love puts on the best bib and tucker and it is also the season when he most neatly grooms his hair to bedecked with the turban prepared in the best sartorial style. Indeed, he receives the season with gay abandon. When viewed towards the hills, they look invitingly attractive and no less is the valley. All the extensive fields and stretching roads seem to offer both delicious sweets to taste and pleasant spectacle to enjoy. Last year's barren trees have put forth new shoots and most of the leaves have become broad and green. Flowers by the foothill, that usually bloom early each year are all tinted red and the long path-ways by the vast pasture have been covered with them. Other flowers too, both in the hills and the dales, have put on a riot of colour.

The Leiron contains description of 100 flowers and orchids, endemic as well as exotic species. The diction in the text is greatly archaic as well as endowed with swift rhythmic flow.

==== Description of Kabok Lei flower ====
Giving reference to King Khagemba and the Manipur Kingdom, the beauty and grace of Lei Kabok, also called Kabok Lei (Gardenia jasminoides), is described by King Charairongba, as follows:

It is a flower that remains ever fresh as not eaten by worms and is fondly sought after in the four corners of the country, eight directions, nay in all quarters. It is distinct for its beautiful shape, its tender stalk and for its pure white colour. It is a flower once nurtured by King Khagemba who preferred to take it with him even for his long home. It is a flower that comes handy to both boys and girls as a present of love. Such a luscious flower has blossomed forth in an unending array of white and definitely the season is of this flower.

=== Other notable mentions ===
Other notable mentionings of the plant species include the "nongleishang" (Meitei: ꯅꯣꯡꯂꯩꯁꯪ), the "santhong maiba lei" (Meitei: ꯁꯟꯊꯣꯡ ꯃꯥꯏꯕ ꯂꯩ), "kusum lei" (Meitei: ꯀꯨꯁꯨꯝ ꯂꯩ, lit. 'Safflower'), "kakyai padam lei" (Meitei: ꯀꯛꯌꯥꯏ ꯄꯥꯗꯝ ꯂꯩ), "singut yenga lei" (Meitei: ꯁꯤꯉꯨꯠ ꯌꯦꯉꯥ ꯂꯩ), "thambal" (Meitei: ꯊꯝꯕꯥꯜ, lit. 'Lotus flower'), the "laiyen hanbi paothil lei" (Meitei: ꯂꯥꯏꯌꯦꯟ ꯍꯟꯕꯤ ꯄꯥꯎꯊꯤꯜ ꯂꯩ), among the 100s.

== See also ==
- List of Manipuri kings
- Manipur (princely state)
- Puya Meithaba

== Notes ==
Preceded by Paikhomba	King of Manipur; 1697–1709	Succeeded by Pamheiba
