= Haricharan Sai =

Prince of Manipur

- Meitei Prince
- Born: 7 September 1726; Kangleipak
- Died: 8 June 1785 (aged 58); Kangleipak
Names
- Haricharan Swaha
Era name and dates
- Medieval Manipur: 18th century CE
- House: Lourungpurenmayum
- Dynasty: Ningthouja dynasty
- Father: Pamheiba
- Mother: Chingakham Chanu Hisabika
- Religion: Hinduism
- Occupation: Prince of Kangleipak Kingdom

Haricharan Sai was a Meitei prince of the Ningthouja dynasty of Medieval Kangleipak. He was a son of King Pamheiba and Queen Chingakham Chanu Hisabika. He was one of the chief collector of revenue called Lourungpuren. He was the lower chief collector of revenue among his two other brothers who were also chief collectors of revenue. The members of the Lourungpurenmayum of the royal family (Ningthemchamayums) of Manipur are descended from Prince Haricharan Sai.

Prince Haricharan Sai is also mentioned in the Cheitharol Kumbaba, the Royal Chronicle of Manipur.

== See also ==
- Ananta Sai
