= Bhagya Chandra =

King of Manipur (r. 1759–62, 1763–98)

Bhagya Chandra Ching-Thang Khomba
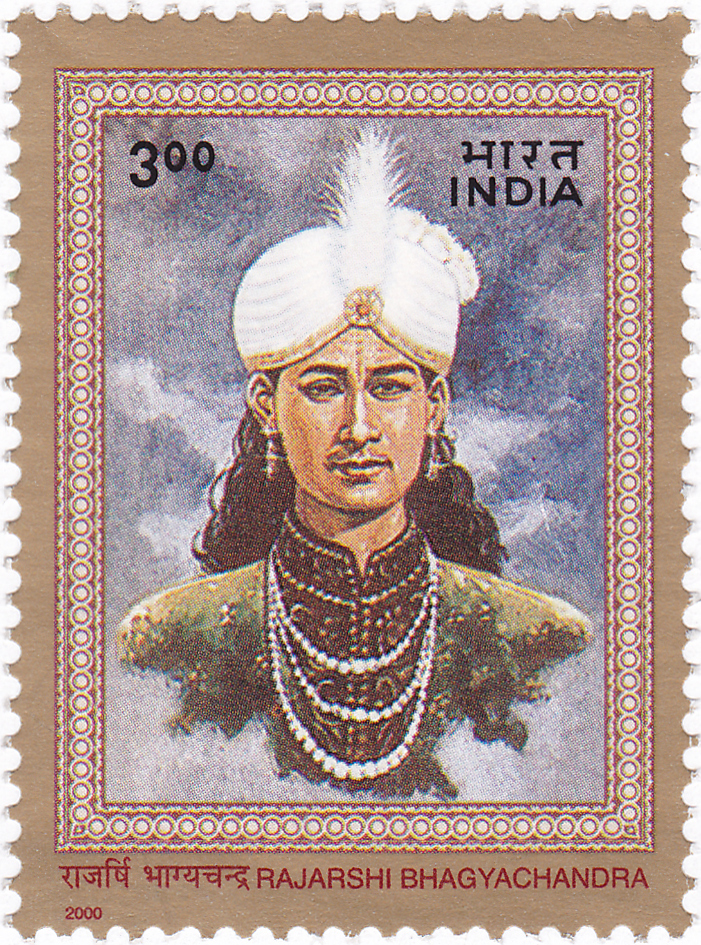

King of Manipur
- Reign: 1759–1761, 1763–1798
- Coronation: 7th Sajibu, 1759
- Predecessor: Gaurisiam
- Successor: Rabinchandra
- Born: 13th Poinu 1748; Janmasthan Moirangkhom, Imphal
- Died: 1798; Murshidabad, West Bengal
- Spouse: Akham Chanu Bhanumati
- Issue: Rabinchandra; Madhuchandra; Kuranganayani; Chourjit Singh; Marjit Singh; Gambhir Singh
- House: House of Karta
- Dynasty: Ningthouja dynasty
- Father: Syam Sai
- Mother: Wayenbam Chanu Chakha Loikhombi
- Religion: Hinduism
- Occupation: Rajarshi – Raja (monarch) as well as Rishi (saint)

Bhagya Chandra (also known as Ching-Thang Khomba and Jai Singh) (1748–1798) was a king of Manipur in the 18th century CE. He was the grandson of Gharib Niwaz and ruled Manipur for almost forty years (1759–1798). During his rule, he faced several invasions from the Burmese empire, introduced cultural reforms, consolidate Moirang kingdom into Meitei kingdoms and went into exile, but eventually made peace with Burma.

Bhagya Chandra is known for spreading Vaishnavism in the Manipur state. He invented the Manipuri Raas Leela dance. His daughter (Shija Laioibi) played the role of Radha at the first performance and became a popular figure in Manipur.

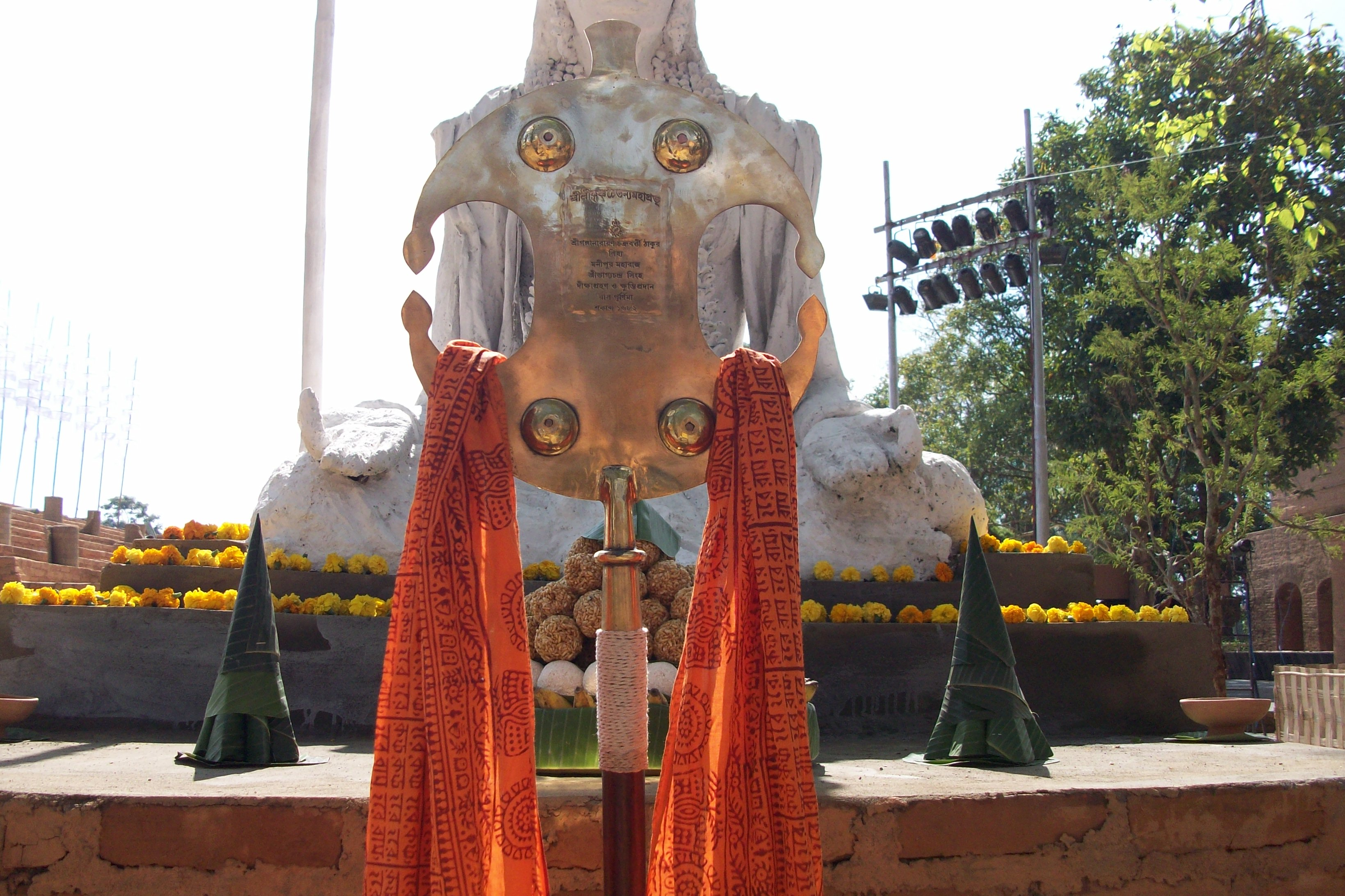
The Jayapatra or Khunti of Rajarshi Bhagyachandra, being displayed in front of his statue in the Kangla Fort in 2014

== Background ==
Bhagya Chandra was a grandson of King Gharib Niwaz, born to his eldest Syam Sai. Syam Sai was the legitimate heir to Gharib Niwaz, but the latter promised the throne to a son of his second wife, Chit Sai (Ajit Shah). Accordingly when Gharib Niwaz abdicated in 1748, Chit Sai became the king. According to the Royal Chronicle, Chit Sai expelled Gharib Niwaz in 1750 and the latter went to Burma, where his niece Sicha was a queen. Syam Sai was also in Burma at this time. In 1751, it was reported that both Gharib Niwaz and Syam Sai had "returned", and Chit Sai sent an expedition to have them killed, and it was done "on the banks of Brahmaputra", according to the royal chronicle.

Chit Sai's treachery was soon discovered and he was chased out of Manipur. He fled to Kachar. His brother Bharat Sai (Bharat Shah) took the throne. But he was also thrown out within a year.

In 1753, Syam Sai's eldest son Gourisiam (or Gour Shah, also known as Marampa) became the king. A Manipuri tradition states that Gourisiam and Bhagya Chandra made a pact to rule alternatingly in five year terms. Accordingly, Gourisiam abdicated in 1759 allowing Bhagya Chandra to ascend the throne.

== Burmese invasions ==
While Manipur was going through such turmoil, Burma was rejuvenating itself. The Toungoo dynasty collapsed soon after Gharib Niwaz's death, and Alaungpaya rose to be king, founding a fresh Konbaung dynasty in 1752. The Burmese also started using firearms, possibly acquired from European traders.

The Burmese record states that the Manipuris invaded again in 1754 and Alaungpaya set out to settle scores with Manipur. He personally led an invasion in 1758. Gaurisiam sent Bhagyachandra and his uncle Anand Sai to meet the invasion at Samjok and Tamu respectively. The Tamu force got repulsed to Kakching. Gaurisiam went to join it at Kakching, possibly with additional forces, but they were all defeated. Bhagyachandra fought at Leisangkhong, but he was also defeated. The Manipur Chronicle states that the country was devastated. The Burmese established themselves in the "Land of Meeteis". According to a historian of Burma, Alaungpaya halted in Imphal for thirteen days, took what loot there was (many residents having fled to the hills), threw two heavy cannons into the river, and returned to Ava, while leaving permanent stockades at Tamu and Samjok. The Kabaw Valley was "permanently annexed".

This was only the first of many Burmese invasions to come.

Bhagyachandra ascended the throne in 1759, but his position became "precarious" due to the intrigues of his uncle Chit Sai (Ajit Shah), who was ensconced in Cachar and is said to have appealed to the British authorities for assistance in regaining the throne of Manipur. (Note: The British fought the Battle of Plassey against Siraj-ud-Daulah in 1757, and installed Mir Qasim on the throne of Bengal. Qasim granted Chittagong to the British. These were still early days of British Empire in India, whose strength was based in South India at Madras.) Upon hearing about this, Bhagyachandra sent his own mission, via an envoy called Haridas Gosain, to Harry Verelst, the Chief of Chittagong. Gosain argued the Manipuri case effectively, sought help against Burmese invasions, and persuaded the British that there were opportunities for trade with China via Manipur. As the British were preoccupied with the affairs in Delhi, it was not until 14th September 1762, that a formal treaty was signed by Haridas Gossain on behalf of Jai Singh and Harry Verelst.

Six companies of British sepoys were sent towards Manipur in 1763, with instructions to "fix post at Manipur and make themselves acquainted with the strength and disposition of the Burmese". The British troops made it as far as Khaspur, then capital of Kachari kingdom, but returned due to an impending war with Mir Qasim. It is also heard that heavy rains at that time hampered further progress and that the troops suffered losses due to sickness. Gourishyam, who had become king again in 1761, wrote to Verelst sending 500 gold rupees for the expenses incurred and promising to pay in produce for the troops to be stationed in Manipur. But the British cut off the transaction after this point. Gourishyam died in 1763, and Bhagyachandra became king again.

The Burmese king Hsinbyushin invaded in 1764, which is again said to be in response to a Manipuri invasion. The Burmese invasion was devastating, causing Bhagyachandra to flee to Tekhao, Assam. Hsinyubshin took away many captives, whom he used for populating his new capital at Ava. A sizeable Manipuri population was formed in Ava, serving in a variety of functions, most notably as cavalry.

Bhagya Chandra, along with his queen and a few loyal attendants, fled to Ahom (modern-day Assam), where they lived under the protection of its ruler, Rajeswar Singha.

=== First expedition ===
After a test of faith, Bhagya Chandra appealed to Rajeswar Singha for military assistance. Singha agreed and sent an army to overthrow Chitsai and reinstate Bhagya Chandra. The expedition was set back in Nagaland where they were attacked by Naga tribesmen and poisonous snakes. Rajeswar Singha called off the unsuccessful venture in 1767.

=== Second expedition ===
In November 1768, Bhagya Chandra and Rajeswar Singha decided to make another attempt to invade Manipur. Bhagya Chandra led 10,000 Ahom troops across the Kachar to the Mirap river. Many battles ensued between the Ahoms and Meiteis on one side, and the Naga, Chitsai and the Burmese on the other. In 1773, Bhagya Chandra was reinstated as the king of Manipur.

== Reign ==
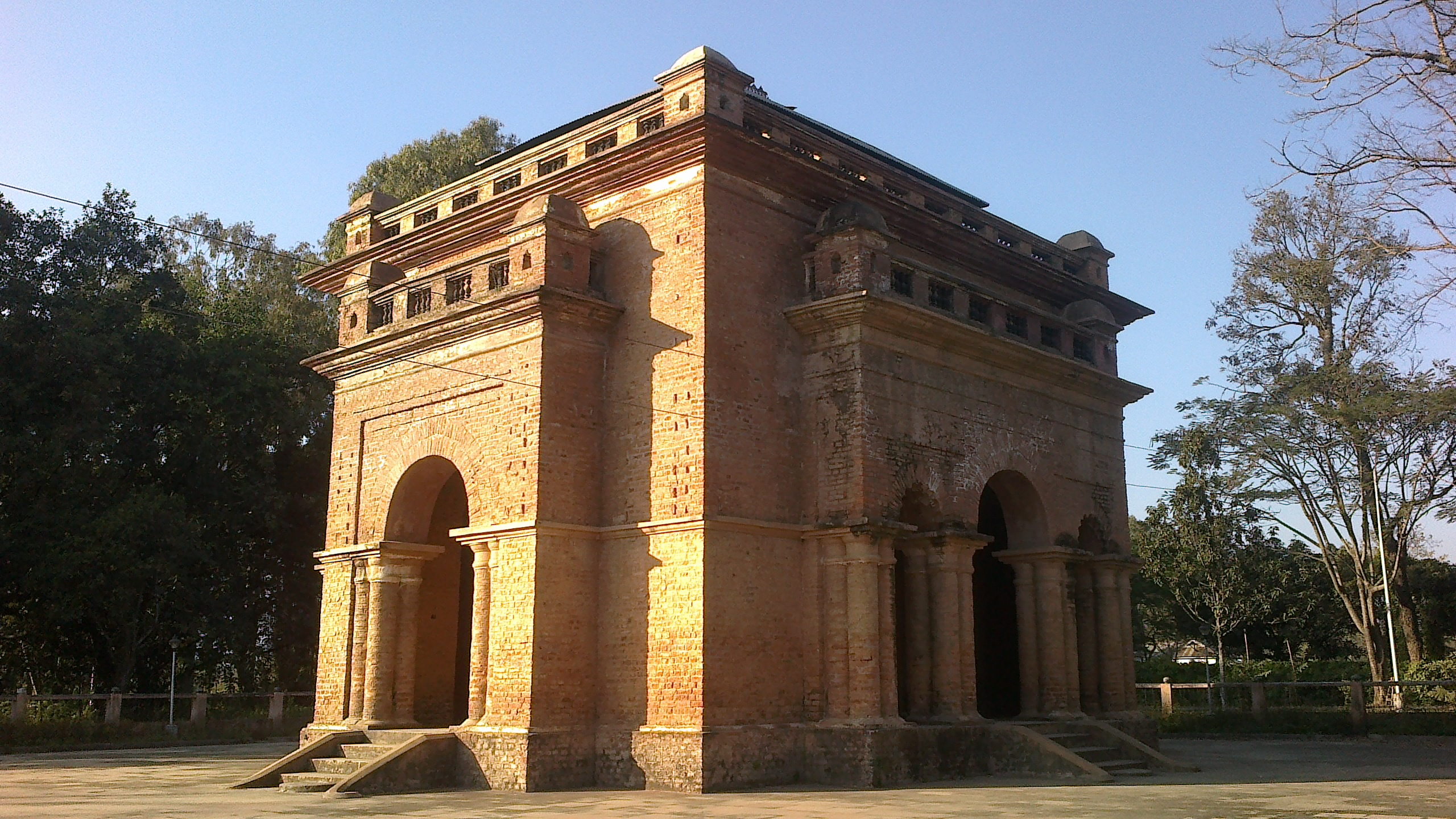
Monument of Bhagya Chandra

During his reign, the Meiteis repelled the Burmese from Manipur. Though his exploits did not equal to Pamheiba's exploits, his reign was characterised by security and consoliadation. He was a great patron of the arts and religion, and his strong Manipuri Vaishnavism reflected on the Meiteis. He was an ardent devotee of Chaitanya Mahaprabhu and during his reign a statue of Nityananda was created in 1795.

In 1796 he moved his capital to Kangla. A year later, on 5 February 1798, he abdicated the throne to his eldest son Rabinchandra. He spent his later years on pilgrimage to various Vaishnavite holy sites, including Nabadwip. He died on 25th December, 1798 in Murshidabad, West Bengal.

== Seniority of Haochong and Ngaprum villages by a royal verdict ==
In 1783, the villages of Haochong and Ngaprum villages contested over seniority and they were presented to the court. The descendants of Meitei King Naothingkhong went to establish village at Yireng mountain to do the formal works which were previously done by the Mayangs. After that, they established themselves in the villages at Haochong and later named as Haochongpan. The court officials examined the royal records and found that Ngaprum villages were established in the reign of Meetingu Khagemba. So, Haochong villages were senior to Ngaprum villages and a royal verdict of that were made known to both of the parties.

== Relationship with hill tribals ==
In 1781, the Wokphrun Haos paid respect to Maharaja and they were invited to a polo match.

In 1783, Maharaja subjugated Nga (headman from Satang village) with 250 its villagers. Maharaja gave them spades, daos and clothes and settled them at the top of Nongsakam Mountain (probably Nongsamei mountain near Bishnupur District).

In 1784, the Wokphrun Haos came to Court and the king gave them clothes, spades and daos, salt and fruits.

In 1786, the Chirus of Moirang were gathered and established a village at Maku.

In 1790, 304 Luhuppa Haos were made to establish a village at Purumpan (probably Porompat). 35 Kharam Haos were made to settle at Waikok. The Moirang Luhuppa Haos presented the king one head of Kharam Hao.

In 1792, Kabuis from the mountain range were hired to build river bank of Chandranadi (a river in Canchipur).

In 1794, the Lakpa of Wangkei left to inspect Snayan Lokchao for housing for Chothe. The Tarao and the people from Pallel caught one rhinocero and presented it to the king. A royal Hanchapa supervised the migration of people from Chothe main village of Lammangdong (present Bishnupur) and lead them to a new settlement.

== Conflicts with Haos (hills tribals and valley tribals) ==
=== Wokphrun Haos ===
In 1783, the Jubraj marched at night to Waichei to repel Wokphrun Haos and blocked the Iril River at Sekta. Many people went to dam up the Iril River at its source. In 1784, the Jubraj went to Soisa Kameng and negotiated with the Wokphrun Haos and the matter was settled.

=== Khongjai Expedition ===
In 1786, the Maharaja gather its people for swearing of Khongjai expedition. A royal encampment was made at Kuchu valley. Two Khongjais presented a bell metal gong and other gifts to the king at that royal encampment. Luhuppa Haos were present during the expedition and show their strength of spears and was able to penetrate the shields of Khongjais. On reaching Tuyai area, the king's army plundered paddy of the Khongjais and also burnt the paddy. A message was received to the king that there was infighting among Khongjais themselves. After that, Maharaja performed spear dance and sang Ougri to indicate subjugation. Stone pillars were also erected at Tuivai. Maharaja returned to the army encampment and stayed at Kentak. Many subjugated people presented gifts to the king. After that, the king returned to his capital through Maputhou army camp, Leimatak and reached Lammangdong (present Bishnupur).

=== Saiton ===
In 1789, the king went to Bishnupur to attack Saiton and encamped at Cheklapai, the king scatter the Saiton village. In 1791, villagers of Tumman and Saipum presented to the king 60 heads of Saiton people as war trophies.

=== Chothe ===
In 1795, Chothe Haos killed 4 people from the Sikhong. Later they raided Andro killing 12 people. The Lakpa of Wangkei repelled the Chothe Haos. In 1796, Chothe Haos raided at Kameng and they were repelled.

=== Kharam ===
In 1790, the Lakpa of Wangkei attacked the Kharam Haos. Kharam Haos killed 32 Pena musicians.

== Religion and culture contributions ==
=== Religion ===
An image of Sanamahi was made for the first time in 1778. In 1779, the image of Sanamahi was inaugurated.

In 1788, Maharaja, Queen and most of the royal ladies feasted on fruit offered to Sanamahi. Maharaja dedicated an elephant to Sanamahi.

In 1775, he made to carve the Govinda murti from jack fruit tree at Kaina hills. In 1779, many performances of his now-popular Rasa Lila dance were performed.

=== Life in Assam ===
Chitsai wrote a letter to Rajeswar Singha saying that the person taking refuge at his court was not the true Bhagya Chandra, and advised Singha to banish Bhagya Chandra. Singha was somewhat persuaded by this letter and began treating Bhagya Chandra with suspicion.

In Meitei legends, the real Bhagya Chandra was said to have had supernatural powers. To see whether the usurper was correct, Singha designed a test at the behest of his court. In a public arena, Bhagya Chandra, while unarmed, was to catch and tame a wild elephant.

Confronted with insurmountable odds, King Bhagyachandra is said to have prayed to Govinda (Krishna) for guidance. Govinda appeared to him in a dream and instructed him to enter the arena donning a garland while holding japa beads. At the end of the instructions, Govinda assured him of victory.

The dream also stated that Bhagya Chandra would be the sole king of Manipur. Upon regaining the kingdom, he should install a Krishna murti. The deity, Govinda, should be carved from a certain old jackfruit tree growing on the slopes of Kaina hill.

After installing the deity, Govinda said the king should arrange for the performance of a Rasa-Lila, in which Krishna would be worshipped with song and dance. Bhagya Chandra also received in this vision a complete plan on how to execute the Ras Lila.

Bhagya Chandra entered the arena, donning the garland and japa as instructed in his vision. In the ensuing fight, the spectators noted that the elephant seemed to recoil as if struck by a ghost. King Bhagya Chandra said that he saw "Lord Krishna as the mahout".

=== Cultural works ===
The tradition of Rasa Lila in Manipur is attributed to Ching-Thang. The first Manipur Maha Rasleela was performed in 1777.

It was his daughter Shija Lailoibi who first took the role of Radha in the Manipuri Raas Leela dance.

Under the influence of Bengali missionaries, he also started the tradition of Sankirtan in Manipur.

=== Literary works ===
- Laithok Laikha Jogi

== Family and succession ==
Ching-Thang Khomba was son of Syam Sai (Khurai-Lakpa), who had two brothers Mantri Ananda Shai and Chitsai. Ching-Thang Khomba had many siblings, the most famous of whom was Gaurisiam, King of Manipur until his death in 1763.

Bhagya Chandra had eight sons: Sanahal, Rabinchandra (Labanya Chandra), Madhuchandra, Tulsijit, Chaurajit, Marjit, Daoji (Khongjai Ngamba) and Gambhir Singh. Sanahal died early. Bhagya Chandra placed Rabinchandra on the throne before he retired to Nabadwip. From this time up to the First Anglo-Burmese War, Manipur faced fratricidal wars among Bhagya Chandra's sons.

== Bibliography ==
- Aung-Thwin, Michael; Aung-Thwin, Maitrii (2013), A History of Myanmar since Ancient Times: Traditions and Transformations (revised ed.), Reaktion Books, ISBN 9781861899392
- Banerjee, Anil Chandra (1946) [1943], The Eastern Frontier of British India, 1784–1826 (Second ed.), Calcutta: A. Mukherjee – via archive.org
  - Banerjee, Anil Chandra (1964) [1943], The Eastern Frontier of British India, 1784–1826 (Third ed.), Calcutta: A. Mukherjee – via archive.org
- Cocks, S. W. (1919), A Short History of Burma, London: McMillan – via archive.org
- Harvey, G. E. (1925). History of Burma: From the Earliest Times to 10 March 1824. London: Frank Cass & Co. Ltd – via archive.org.
- Parratt, Saroj Nalini Arambam (2005). The Court Chronicle of the Kings of Manipur: The Cheitharon Kumpapa, Volume 1. London: Routledge. ISBN 9780415344302.
- Parratt, Saroj Nalini Arambam (2009). The Court Chronicle of the Kings of Manipur: The Cheitharon Kumpapa, Volume 2. Foundation Books / Cambridge University Press India. ISBN 978-81-7596-854-7 – via Cambridge Core.
- Phayre, Arthur P. (1883). History of Burma. London: Trübner and Company – via archive.org.
- Roy, Jyotirmoy (1972) [1958], History of Manipur (Second ed.), Calcutta: Eastlight Book House – via archive.org
- Singha, Memchaton (2016), "Marriage Diplomacy between the States of Manipur and Burma, 18th to 19th Centuries", Proceedings of the Indian History Congress, 77: 874–879, JSTOR 26552717
- Tarapot, Phanjoubam (2003), Bleeding Manipur, Har-Anand Publications, ISBN 978-81-241-0902-1
- Thant, Myint-U (2001), The Making of Modern Burma, Cambridge University Press, ISBN 978-0-521-79914-0

Preceded by Gaurisiam	King of Manipur; 1769–1798	Succeeded by Rabinchandra
