= Gharib Niwaz (Manipur) =

King of Manipur from 1709 to 1748

Pamheiba Gharib Niwaz
- Meidingu, Ningthou & Maharaja of Kangleipak (Meitei for 'Manipur kingdom')

King of Manipur
- Reign: 1709–13 December 1748
- Coronation: 1709 at age of 19 year
- Predecessor: Pitambar Charairongba
- Successor: Chitsai
- Born: Pamheiba; 23 December 1690; Kangla
- Died: 13 December 1748 (aged 57); Ava
- Issue: Khurai Lakpa; Chitsai (Ajit Sai); Bharatsai; Prince Ngaobram Bir Sai, the Senapati (Theer Sai); Ananta Sai; Haricharan Sai; Haripriya
Names
- Meidingu Pamheiba
- House: Royal Family of Manipur
- Dynasty: Ningthouja dynasty
- Father: Pitambar Charairongba
- Mother: Nungthilchaibi
- Religion: Hinduism

Gharib Niwaz (Meitei: /pāmheiba/, Sanskrit: Gopal Singh; 23 December 1690 – 13 December 1748), also known as Pamheiba, was the ruler of the Manipur Kingdom, ruling from c. 1709 until his death in 1748. He introduced Hinduism as the state religion of his kingdom (1717), and changed the name of the kingdom from "Kangleipak" to the Sanskrit Manipur (1724). He changed his royal name from his birth name Pamheipa or Pamheiba to the Persianate "Gharib Niwaz". During most of his reign, he was engaged in warfare against the weakened Burmese Toungoo Dynasty.

In the early years of his rule (1710–1717 CE), Gharib Niwaz focused on consolidating his empire and engaging in military expeditions, including a notable victory in 1714 when his forces, disguised as a marriage party, defeated Burmese troops at the confluence of Chindwin and Ru Rivers. As conflicts with the expanding Burmese empire intensified, Gharib Niwaz achieved significant military triumphs, such as defeating Burmese forces at Shan villages and successfully defending against Burmese and Tripuri attacks in 1723.

Gharib Niwaz's military endeavors went beyond defense, with offensive campaigns against Tripuris in 1727 and 1733, and multiple invasions into Burma from 1724 to 1741. The conquest of Sagaing city on the Irrawaddy in 1738 highlighted his military prowess. His legacy, marked by tales of triumph over Burmese forces, showcases Garib Niwaz's strategic brilliance and the enduring impact of his military successes. Under his rule, the Manipuri empire reached unprecedented heights, solidifying its dominance in South-East Asia and leaving an indelible mark on the region's history. According to historian Gangmumei Kamei, during the reign of Garib Niwaz, the Manipuri empire achieved the peak of its power and consolidation in the contemporary South-East Asian region.

== Early life ==
Pamheiba (Meitei: ꯄꯥꯝꯍꯩꯕ, romanized: Paamheiba, Sanskrit: गोपाल सिंह, romanized: Gopal Singh, Persian: غریب نواز, romanized: Ghareeb Nawaaz) was born on 23 December 1690 in Manipur to Pitambar Charairongba and was crowned Meidingu ("king") on 28 August 1709 (the 23rd of Thawan, 1631 Saka Era). Pamheiba has a background, believed by many to be interesting and somewhat mysterious, that intertwines with Naga society and Manipuri royal customs. Raised by a Naga Chief amidst the Naga community, Gharib Niwaz's affinity for Naga customs and attire persisted even after his coronation, where he donned a Naga robe, endearing him to the Nagas who finally found a king of their own. However, historical accounts diverge on his parentage, with British writers suggesting he was the son of a Naga, while local anecdotes hint at royal lineage. Legends speak of a clandestine birth to Queen Nungshel Chaibi, who, fearing the royal custom of only allowing heirs born to the chief queen to survive, sent Gharib Niwaz to be raised by a Naga Chief. Another version suggests he was hidden from a prophecy of patricide, his true identity revealed years later. Eventually, Gharib Niwaz returned to the royal palace, where his true parentage was disclosed, leading to his recognition as the heir to the throne. After converting to Hinduism, Pamheiba took the Persianate name Gharib Nawaz.

== Migration and new settlement ==
In 1716, the Tekhaos (Ahoms) were made to settle in Thongju. In the same year, Pamheiba gave a royal audience for the Tekhaos.

In 1745, the Purum chief and his villagers were made to shift to TaraoKhunman. Kapeng Khongbantaba, and people from Koutruk and Phayeng were moved to settle at Khampat.

== Relationship with tribes ==
In 1717, Pamheiba become allied with Lairam Tangkhuls to fight against the Samsok region.

In 1727, Pamheiba announced that all the hill male tribes also to join the Lanlup which was an army reserve of that time. All the Tangkhuls inhabited in the mountains revolted against his Pamheiba's reign. Many valley people fought and lois people defended the revolt and finally the revolt was subjugated. As a goodwill, the revolted Tangkhuls presented one mithun, one goat, plates and a steel pan to the Pamheiba. In 1733, military expedition was sent to subjugate Ukhrul. But the mission failed killing a total of 70 lives.

In 1728, Pamheiba and his guru attack Maring of Khunpi, Lamlong, Karongthen and Machi.

In 1740, Marings revolted and burnt down villages of Thumkhong, Pallel, Langathel, Kakching and Heirok. During that period 105 people were killed. Pamheiba retaliated and In 1741, Marings were settled with Huirin Thatpa.

== Military conquests ==
His reign lasted 39 years. During his peak conquests, the realm of Manipur extended from the Irrawaddy River in the east to Cachar and Tripura in the west. At some points during his reign, his realm extended into the Chittagong Hill Tracts.

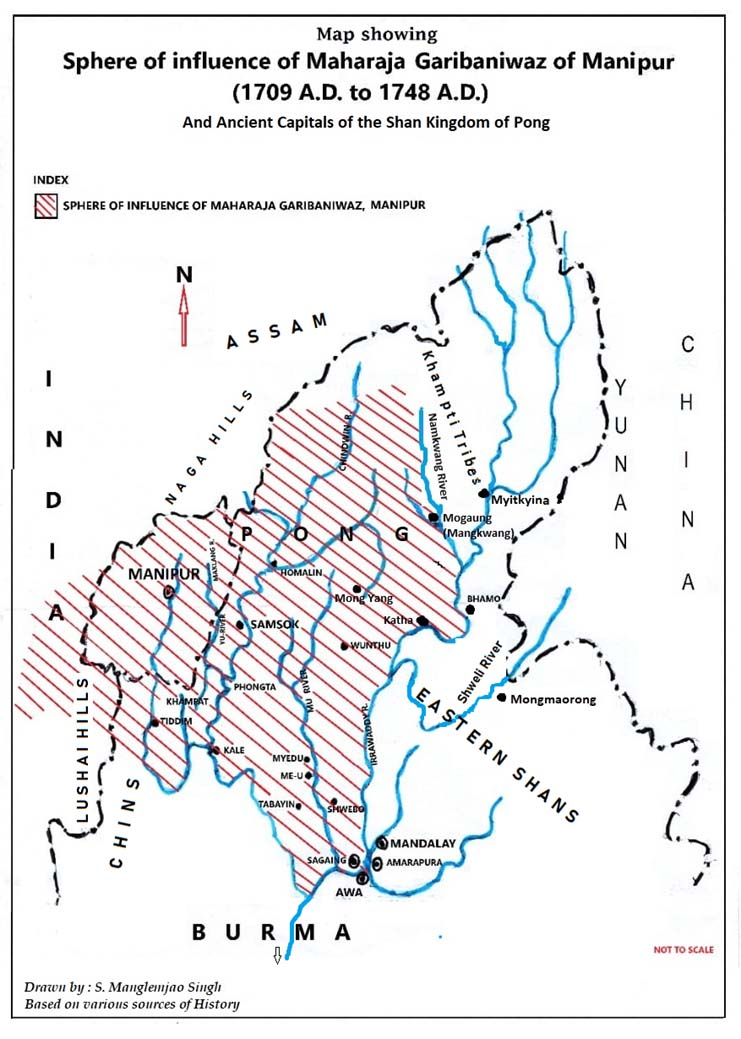
Sphere of influence of Maharaja Garib Niwaz of Manipur.

=== Burma ===
The conflict between the Kingdom of Manipur and the Kingdom of Burma, also known as Awa, was sparked by a series of events rooted in familial ties and political grievances. Following the demotion of his sister, who was married to the Burmese King as Awa-Leima, Manipur King Charairongba harbored deep resentment. Before his demise, he tasked his son Pamheiba (Garibaniwaz) with avenging this slight against their family. The tensions escalated when a delegation from Burma, accompanied by Samsok emissaries, arrived in Manipur seeking a Meitei princess's hand in marriage. Despite King Garibaniwaz's courteous reception, the presence of the Samsok people further fueled his anger, setting the stage for further hostilities between the two kingdoms.

Instead of a princess, the King of Burma was met by cavalry, led by Pamheiba that massacred the Burmese army, and brought many prisoners of war to Imphal. The Burmese sent an expedition in revenge, but it was ambushed in the swamps near Heirok, southwest of Thoubal, and losing heavily retreated in haste. In 1735, Pamheiba invaded Myedu in Shwebo district and carried off loot, cattle and a thousand people. In 1737, Pamheiba again invaded Burma, killed two-thirds of a royal levy, including commander, who came to oppose the invading Manipuris, and swept down to Tabayin in Shwebo district, burning everything they met. Again in 1738, Manipuris went and camped in Thalunbyu west of Sagaing, burnt every house and monastery up to the walls of Ava, stormed the stockade built to protect the Kaunghmudaw Pagoda, slaughtering the Burmese troops like cattle in a pen and killing the commandant, a minister of the Hluttaw Council; the old door-leaves of the pagoda's eastern gateway show a gash made by the sword of Maharaj Pamheiba when he was forcing an entrance.

=== Tripura ===
In April 1723, King Dharma Manikya of Tripura dispatched Commander Satrajit Narayan to invade Manipur. Satrajit Narayan's invasion saw initial success, capturing seven posts and defeating the Manipuri army, led by Pamon Hanchpa and Naharup Sanglen Rakpa. King Gharib Niwaz responded by sending reinforcements under Akong Haopamcha, eventually repelling the Tripuris and forcing them out of Manipur by June 1723. King Dharma Manikya of Tripura formed an alliance with the Burmese. Two forces, totaling 30,000 men, attacked Manipur from different directions. The Manipuris faced challenges but ultimately triumphed, winning battles against both the Burmese and Tripuris in a series of engagements. King Gharib Niwaz launched a retaliatory invasion against Tripura, led by his son Khamlang Pamsapa and Guru Santa Das Gosai. While peace was initially achieved through diplomacy, Gharib Niwaz later overran Tripura in 1734 CE, assuming the title of 'Takhen Ngampa' or Victor of Tripura. In Pamheiba's Tripura campaign, 1100 prisoners were captured, who were absorbed into the Meitei community.

=== Shan States ===
With the help of Burmese, the chieftain of Hsawnghsup declared independence from Manipur. It took 7 years to crush them along with Chanta, Mwang and tongmon Nammon. In 1717–18, the Manipur king led his forces against the Samjok Shans, known as Panga, who were descendants of the Awa ruler of the Pagan Dynasty. He devastated Chanta, a village supplying food to Samjok, and pursued and killed its fleeing inhabitants. Afterward, he attacked Samjok, cutting off its supply lines. Starved and desperate, the Samjok people surrendered to the Manipur king, who agreed to feed them but took their chief and son as captives.

On account of rise of Burmese Kingdom, the Shan Kingdom of Pong was in danger. In March 1739, the Shans requested Manipur to help them. The envoys from Pong returned to their country after about 19 days. Pamheiba started for Burma to invade Sagaing. After the Battle of Sagaing, Pamheiba made the elder brother of the king of Pong king.

=== Mon ===
According to Ningthourol Lambuba, the king of Ava, named Mangdra, sent an emissary to King Pamheiba's court, expressing a sincere desire for a matrimonial alliance. Mangdra specifically requested Princess Satyamala's hand in marriage and invited Pamheiba to visit Ava. Pamheiba, considering the sincerity of the request, agreed and crossed the Irawaddy river. Upon reaching Ava, he learned that Mangdra sought Manipur's friendship to strengthen his forces against the Mons. In response, Pamheiba crossed Irawaddy river and assaulted the Mons where he captured two prominent chiefs of Mons, destroyed the revolting Mons of Koi, he also presented several chopped heads of Mon rebels to his son-in-law king Mangdra.

=== Death ===
Gharib Niwaz and his eldest son Sham Shai went to Burma to settle some political affairs there, his second son, Ajit Shai suspecting that his father intended to place Sham Shai to the throne of Manipur, secretly organized the murder of both of them on their way back to Manipur. He is also believed to be murdered by Ajit Shai at Brahmaputra because Gharib Niwaz also murdered his father Charairongba when the tribes of the hilly areas launched an attack on the Meiteis and Charairongba could not do anything but pray to God. When he was stabbed, he cursed Gharib Niwaz that he will also be murdered by one of his children when he is about to place his eldest son to the throne. Before Charairongba died, he ordered Gharib Niwaz to get revenge on the Burmese for insulting his younger sister.

== Religious policy ==
During the early 18th century, Hindu priests from Sylhet arrived in Manipur to spread Gaudiya Vaishnavism. They were led by Shantidas Adhikari and his associate Guru Gopal Das who succeeded in converting the King from the old Meitei religion to Vaishnavism in 1710. Later during his reign, Pamheiba made Hinduism the official religion, and converted nearly all the Meitei people to Hinduism.

== Family ==
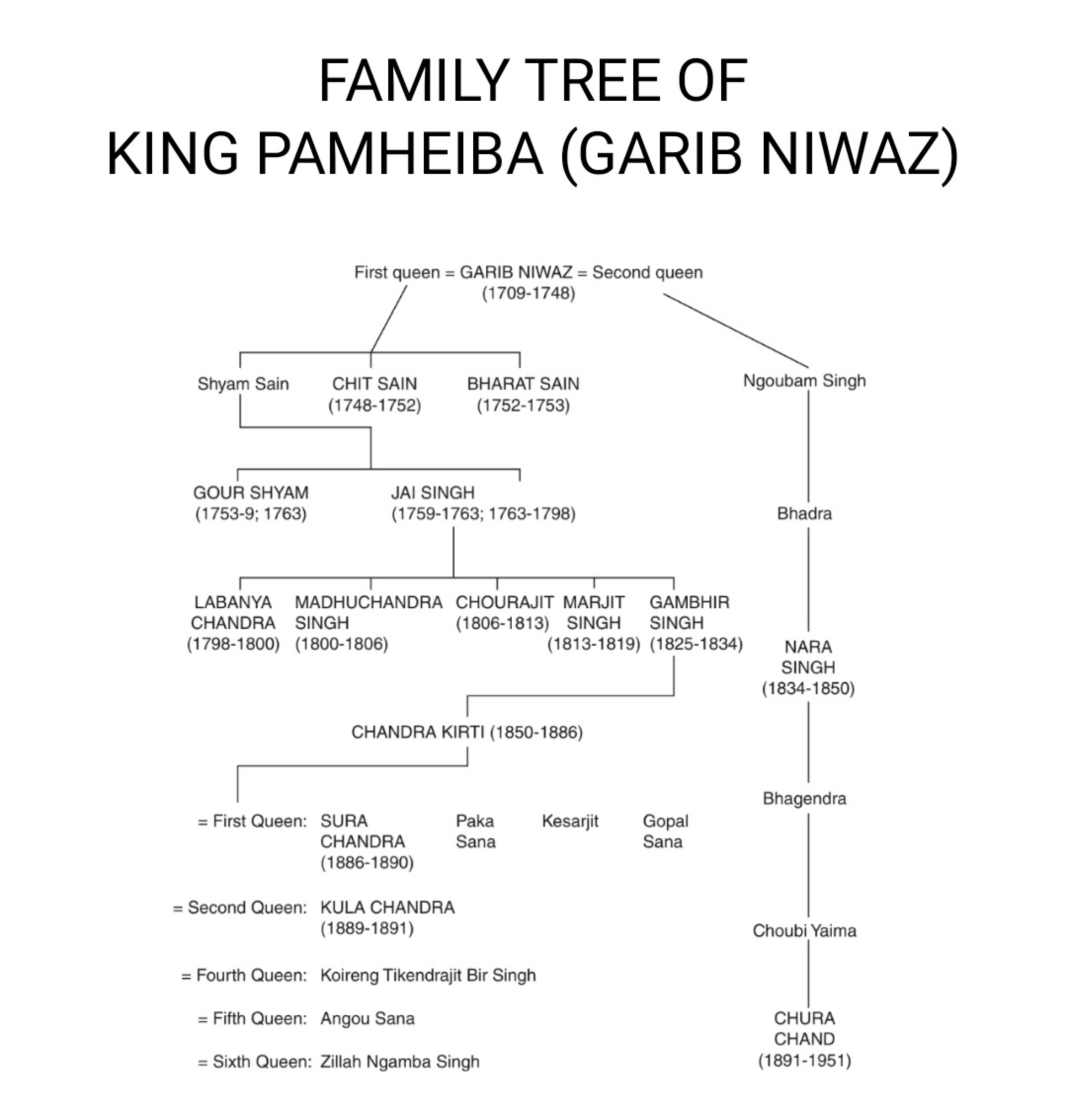
Meitei Royal Family Tree of King Pamheiba (alias Garib Niwaz)

Pamheiba had eight wives, and a large number of sons and daughters. His eldest son, Samjai Khurai-Lakpa, was assassinated by his younger son Chitsai, who came to power after Pamheiba's grandson Gaurisiam. The reign was then followed by Ching-Thang Khomba.

== Bibliography ==
- Barpujari, HK (1992). Barpujari, H K (ed.). The Comprehensive History of Assam. Vol. 2. Guwahati: Publication Board Assam.
- Banerjee, A. C. (1946) [1943], The Eastern Frontier of British India, 1784–1826 (2nd ed.), Calcutta: A. Mukherjee – via archive.org
- Harvey, G. E. (1925). History of Burma: From the Earliest Times to 10 March 1824. London: Frank Cass & Co. Ltd – via archive.org.
- Singh, Kunj Bihari (2004) [1963]. "Manipur Vaishnavism: A Sociological Interpretation". In Rowena Robinson (ed.). Sociology of Religion in India. Themes in Indian Sociology, 3. New Delhi: Sage Publ. India. pp. 125–132. ISBN 0-7619-9781-4.

Preceded by Pitambar Charairongba	King of Manipur; 1720–1751	Succeeded by Gaurisiam
