= Gaurisiam =

Maramba Gaurisiam

King of Manipur
- Reign: 1756 - 1763 CE
- Coronation: 1756 CE
- Predecessor: Bharatsai
- Successor: Ching-Thang Khomba
- Born: mid 18th century Kangla
- Died: 1763
- House: Member of the Royal Family of Manipur
- Dynasty: Ningthouja dynasty

Gaurisiam or Goura Shyam or Maramba or Moramba (mid 18th century- 1763 CE) was a Meitei king who ruled Manipur from 1756 to 1763. He was the brother of Ching-Thang Khomba, King of Manipur. His reign alternated with Ching-Thang Khomba's, reportedly due to Gaurisiam's physical limitations. During certain events that required a healthy and able-bodied king, his rule was interspersed with his brother's.
