= History of Manipur =

Historical account of Manipur

The history of the Indian state of Manipur is reflected by archaeological research, written history and mythology. Historically, Manipur was an independent sovereign kingdom ruled by Meitei dynasty but at different point of time it was invaded and rule over by other state and authority. The Kangleipak State developed under King Loiyumba with its first written constitution in the early 12th century. Manipur under the 18th-century king Pamheiba saw the legendary burning of sacred scripture.

Manipur became a princely state under British rule in 1891 after the Anglo-Manipur war, the last of the independent states to be incorporated into British Raj as a princely state. During the Second World War, Manipur was the scene of battles between Japanese and Allied forces. After the war, Maharaja Bodhachandra signed a Treaty of Accession merging the kingdom into India. It was made a union territory in 1956 and a full-fledged state in 21 January 1972.

== Nomenclature ==
During the latter part of its history, Manipur and its people were known by different names to their neighbours. The Shans or Pongs called the area Cassay, the Burmese Kathe, and the Assamese Meklee. In the first treaty between the British East India Company and Chingthangkhomba signed in 1762, the kingdom was recorded as Meckley. Bhagyachandra and his successors issued coins engraved with the title of Manipureshwar, or lord of Manipur and the name Meckley was discarded. Later on, the Sanskritisation work, Dharani Samhita (1825–34) popularized the legends of the derivation of Manipur's name.

== Prehistoric ==
Archaeological research in Northeast India is severely scarce, mostly limited to surface explorations, and lacking in state-of-the-art methods.

=== Human settlement ===
Few attempts have been made to establish the earliest human settlement in Northeast India, and it is generally thought to have been uninhabited by archaic humans prior to late Pleistocene due to unfavorable geographical conditions. This is however disputed and Northeast Corridors are proposed by some scholars to have played a defining role in early hominid migrations and peopling of India.

=== Paleolithic ===
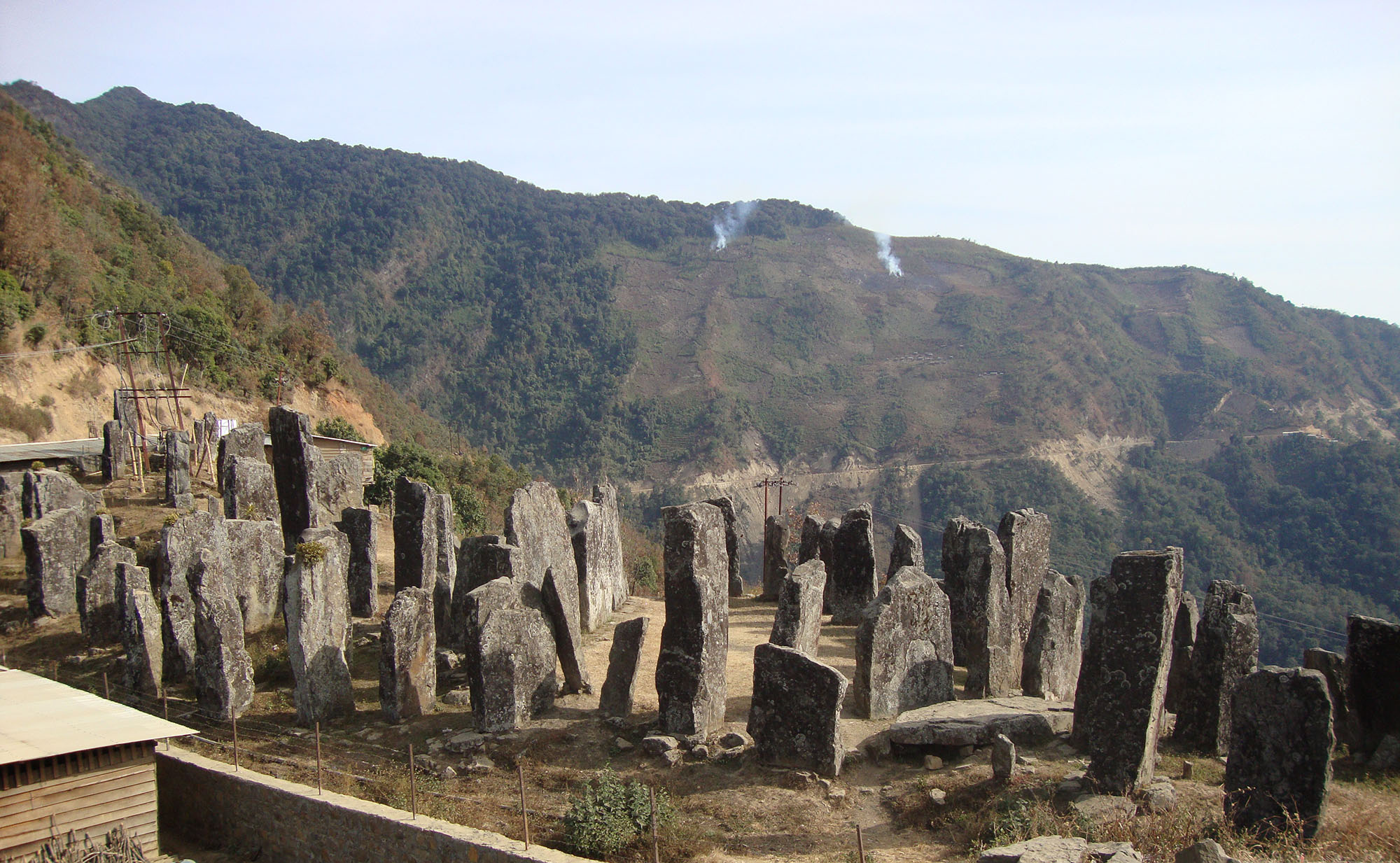
Prehistoric stone erections in the "Willong Khullen" village in northern Manipur, which slightly resembles the Stonehenge of England

Most scholars do not discuss a Paleolithic age in Manipur (and Northeast). However, Manjil Hazarika, in his 2017 survey of prehistory of Northeast India, rejects that there exists any plausible ground to deny presence of Paleolithic culture in Manipur.

A few Paleolithic sites (Khangkhui, Napachik, Machi, Somgu and Singtom) have been located in Manipur. Though, in absence of good chrono-stratigraphic context of the finds and their cohabitation with remains of other ages, accuracy of such identifications remains open to critiques. The existence of Hoabinhian-like complexes remains disputed, as well.

=== Neolithic ===
Multiple Neolithic sites have been identified in Manipur; they include Nongpok Keithelmanbi, Napachik, Laimenai, Naran Siena, and Phunan. Considered to be part of a larger Southeast Asian complex, the identifications are primarily accorded on the basis of stone tools and pottery (esp. cord-impressed ware); characteristic cultural identifiers of the Neolithic (agriculture, animal rearing etc.) are yet to be located and their development chronology is subject of active research. Hazarika notes the Neolithic culture in Northeast to have begun some four thousand years after that in the Gangetic Plains.

Meiteilon, lingua-franca of Meiteis belongs to the TB phylum. Hazarika notes the Manipuri sites to have an abundance of three-legged pottery and cord-impressed ware, very similar to the ones found in Southern China and Thailand, and hypothesizes that Manipur might have been the melting pot of Neolithic impulses from adjoining regions. Roger Blench, in agreement with George van Driem's reconstructions of archeo-linguistic history of Southeast Asia, proposes that Northeast India accommodated a diverse group of foragers since Neolithic age, who learned agriculture and animal rearing c. 4000 B.C before migrating eastwards and establishing the Tibeto-Burman (TB) phylum.

=== Chalcolithic and beyond ===
Hazarika notes the broader region to not show evidence of any significant cultural transformation, upon the dawning of Copper Age (and then, Iron Age). The state has an abundance of megaliths of various shapes, serving distinct purposes.

=== Iron Age ===
There has been a marked absence of historical evidence especially written records governing the span between Iron Age and the first millennium in North East India. Chronicles of other nations mention that trade networks between India proper and South China were likely operating via Manipur; pilgrims are reported to have entered India from China via these territories. The geopolitical history of the region along with the ethno-linguistic background of the inhabitants are largely unknown.

== History ==
=== Sources ===
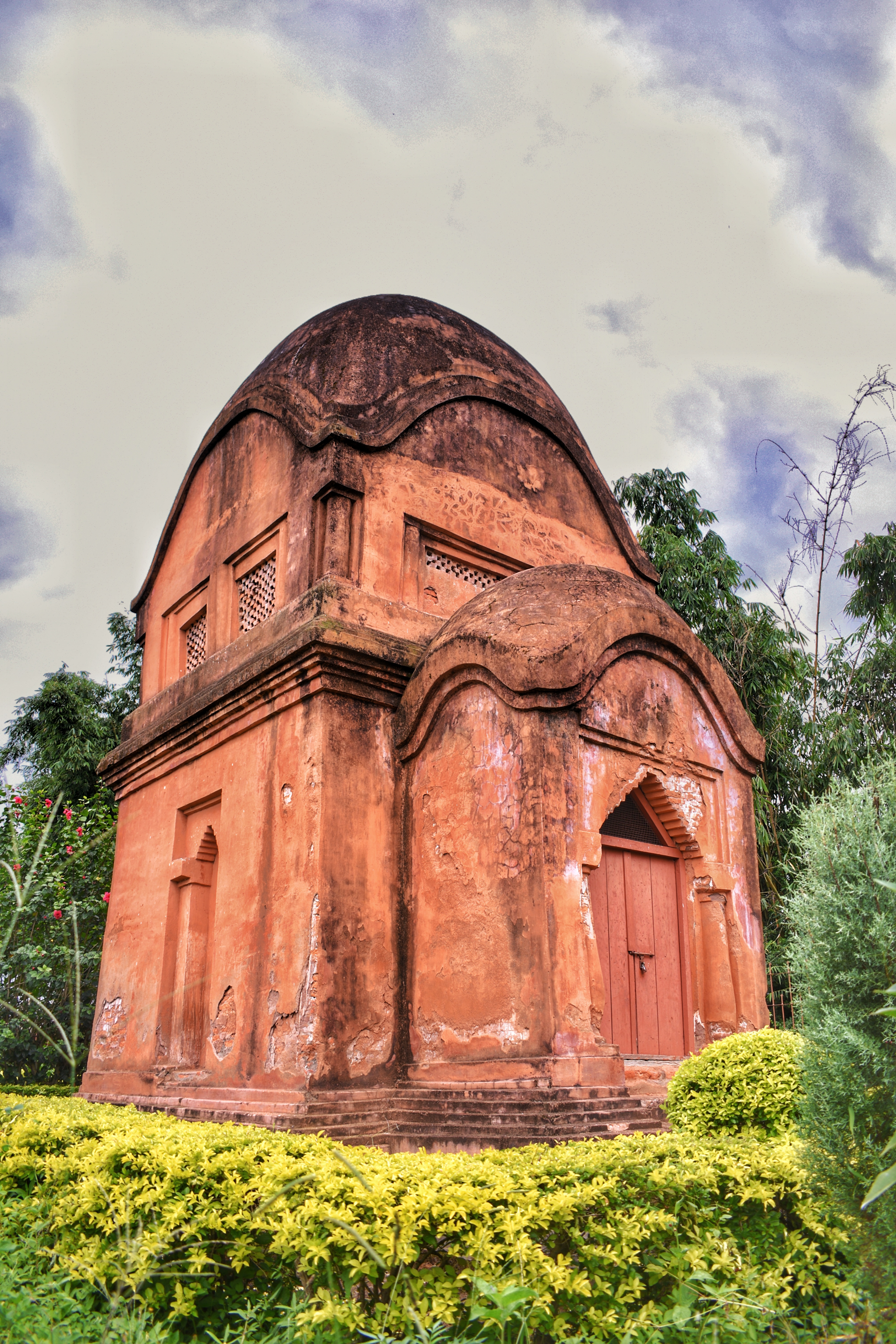
A temple dedicated to Vishnu, built in Bishnupur

The primary source concerning ancient and medieval Manipur has been restricted to the Cheitharol Kumbaba (Ch. K.) – the court history of the kings of Manipur – which dates the first king to 33 CE. However, the historical record herein up to the reign of King Kyampa (1467–1508 CE) are noted to have been redrafted during the reign of Ching-Thang Khomba (Bhagyachandra) in the mid- to late-18th century because those leaves were "lost". This part of the chronicle remains particularly unreliable. The kings of that period are assigned extraordinary spans of length, and there is a scarcity of objective information. Saroj Nalili Parratt hypothesizes that many of these monarchs were probably borrowed from the cultural pantheon and interspersed with religious myths to fit into their collective memory of intra-clan conquests and legitimize the current rule by the Meitei. Parratt as well as Gangmumei Kamei suspect that the initiation date of 33 CE was arrived upon by the scribes via astrological calculations.

Ch. K. is also a Meitei chronicle – Meitei being one of the migrant clans, originally named Ningthouja, who (at some unknown point of time) assimilated others into a confederacy, and gained rulership of the monarchy – with the early sections being essentially themed on the expansion of the Meitei across the valley of Manipur and other exploits.

Some local authors have used Puyas, archaic Manipuri manuscripts in their reconstruction of Manipuri History. This tendency has been criticized by Parratt and others; none of these texts are yet dated by professional historians or subject to serious textual-critical scrutiny, and hence are not suitable for purposes other than commenting on Meitei traditions. (Note: Bryce Beemer writes, "Manipur developed a textual tradition on par with that of Upper Burma or Java. The continued existence of clan identities and leadership is one reason for the bewilderingly diverse historical traditions of Manipur. Each clan wrote its own creation myths, religious histories, clan genealogies, and dynastic accounts of noble houses. Although many of these historical texts contradict each other, they represent a rich ore yet to be mined by most Southeast Asianists.") Scholars have also found Puyas to have been (potentially) forged by Meitei Nationalists in support of their reinvention of history and tradition.

=== Mythology and early kings ===
Pakhangpa, a primordial dragon god in Meitei mythology, is credited in Ch. K. for having established the Meitei rule by subjugating the "Poireitons". The first seven kings mentioned over Ch. K. – Pakhangpa, Tompok, Taothingmang, Khui Ningngongpa, Pengsipa, Kaokhongpa and Naokhampa – allegedly ruled until 411 CE. Barring Pakhangpa and Taothingmang, the chronicle only records the regnal span of each king. Parratt notes that there's not even any evidence of these seven rulers belonging to the same dynasty, and in all probabilities they were reconstructed from oral legends of varying origins. The chronicle itself mentions that nothing much is known about these "divine"-like kings.

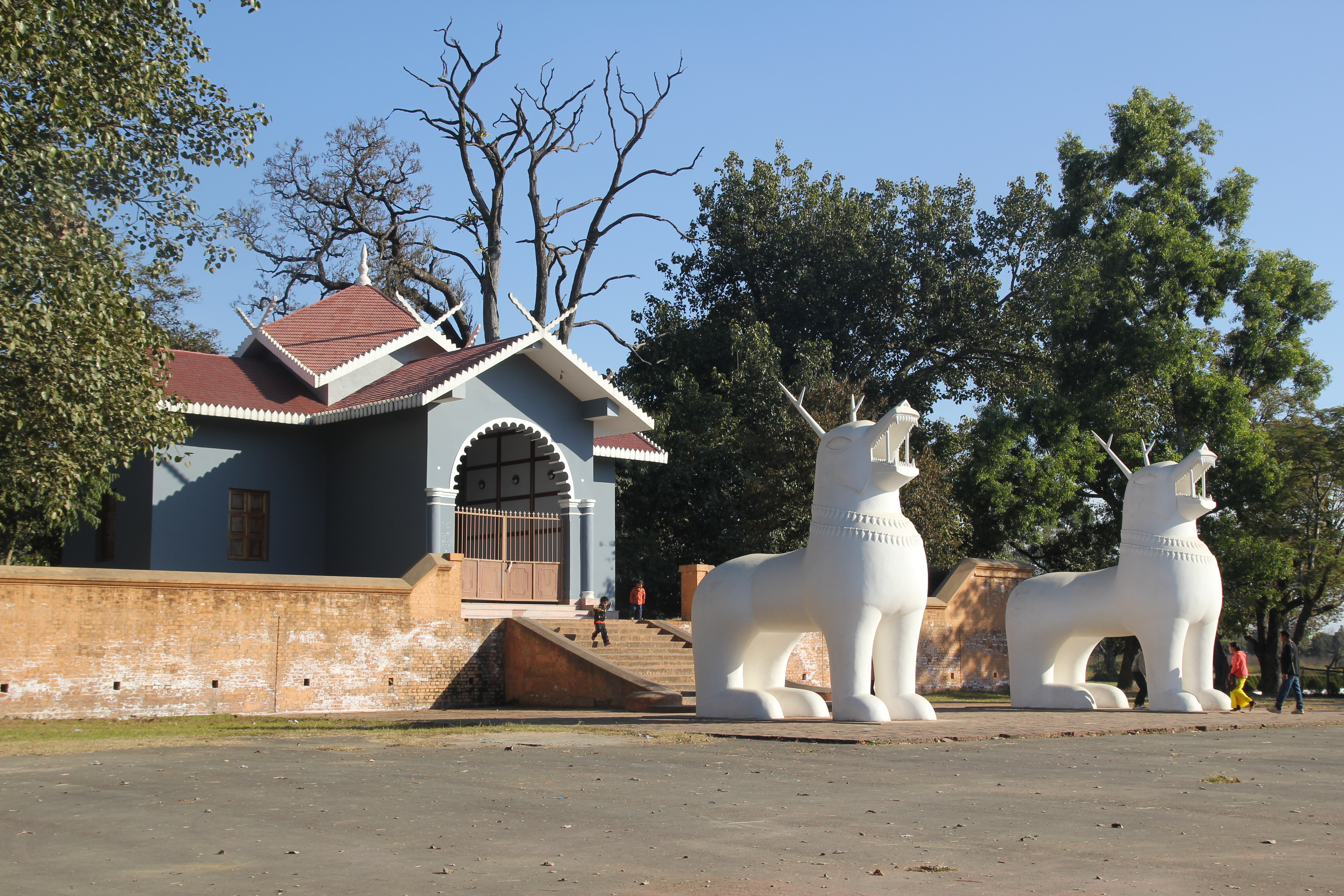
A historic dual statue of dragon lion Kanglasha in front of the inner entrance gate to the Kangla Palace of Imphal, which was once the ruling seat of the Meitei kings in old days.

Naokhampa was succeeded by Naophangpa, about whom nothing significant is mentioned in the chronicle. He was succeeded by his son Sameirang, who fought a successful battle over Aangom, a fellow clan. The next ruler was Konthoupa and his reign saw some devastating warfare with "Senloi Langmai". After a monarch-less span of five years, Naothingkhong became the next king. During his reign the chieftain of Pong Kingdom is noted to have engaged in an annexation spree before returning via Manipur. Khongtekcha was the next king; a successful battle over the Moirang clan is noted, and he ruled for ten years. After a gap of eleven years, the next king was Keirencha, who ruled for fifteen years. He was succeeded by Yarepa, who reigned for twenty two years. Nothing else is noted about these two kings. The next four kings were Aayangpa, Ningthoucheng, Chenglei Yipan Lanthapa and Yirengpa, who ruled for a combined total of 253 years. All of them are noted to have emerged victorious in varied kinds of warfare over fellow clans – Aayangpa subdued the Nongyai Khumans, Ningthoucheng raided Houkei, Lanthapa captured a group of Luwangs, and Yirengpa defeated the Moirangs as well as Khumans.

Loiyumpa was the next king, and Ch. K. records his reign in considerable detail. He is credited with the initiation of the first 'constitution'. He was succeeded by Loitongpa, who emerged successful in some undescribed battles on the eastern fronts, probably waged over autochthonous ethnic groups. After a rule of twenty eight years, he was succeeded by Aatom Yoirenpa, who ruled for thirteen years. Yoirenpa was soon chased out by his brother and had to take refuge with the Khumans. Under Yiwanthapa, who reigned for thirty two years, a successful war was waged on the Khumans and their chief queen was murdered. The next ruler was Thawanthapa. In a thirty six year long rule, he subdued multiple internal and external threats. Despite allying with the Khumans once, in a raid against the villagers of Hairem, he would go on to defeat the Khumans. The next king was Chingthang Lanthapa, who defeated the Khumans as well as Kamus, in his eleven year long rule. Thingpai Senhongpa succeeded him; nothing significant is noted except that he ruled for 5 years. Puranthapa, the next king, re-defeated the Khumans at Pairou, consolidated the territories of Koupa Koutai, and conquered the Chakpas.

Khumompa became king in 1263 and went on to ally with the Khumans to successfully ward off an invasion by the rulers of Kabaw Valley. A battle over the mountain-folks of Hao was also waged and their king Maimumpa was captured. Moirampa succeeded him, and again defeated the Khumans as well as Moirangs. Other battles against the Kekes and people of Makihao are noted; Korirong was captured. Thangpi Lanthapa ruled for twenty two years and trounced the Moirangs as well as the Loipi Haos; Tengkongbi and Marem Namngapa were captured. Kongyapa ascended in 1324 went on to succeed him. He was succeeded by Tenheipa, who reigned for twenty years and engaged in a multitude of warfare. Nothing is mentioned about the next ruler Tonapa, except that he reigned for five years. Then, Tapungpa ascended to the throne and waged successful warfare against the Loipi Marems, before being assassinated by Khamlangpa, the king of Chingsong, after thirty five years of rule. Again, there is a scarcity of information about the next king Lairenpa; he reigned for five years and there were no king for five, after. Punsipa's reign went until 1432, and was witness to numerous clashes including one with Moirangs.

One of the early states of the region was the Kangleipak State, its first constitution, the Loiyumba Sinyen, was made during the reign of King Loiyumba in the late 11th century.

=== Early Modern ===
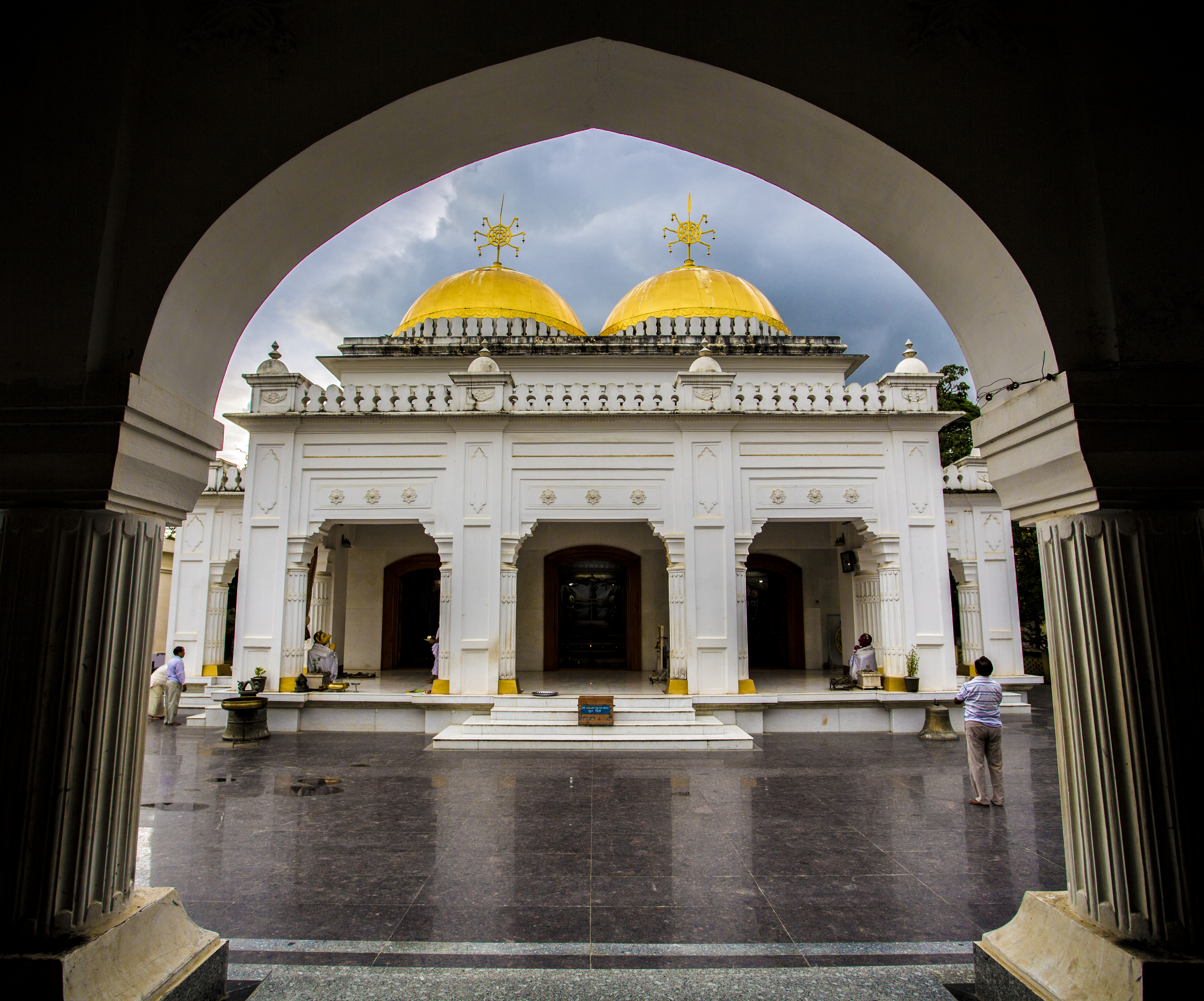
The Temple of Shri Govindaji in the "Palace Compound" in Imphal, was the center of Meitei Vaishnavism of the Meitei Hindus in Manipur.

The early modern period is often called "medieval" by Meitei historians.

Ningthoukhompa ruled from 1432 to 1467. He routed out the Moirangs, and repulsed a rebellion by the Tankhnus of the mountains.

During the reign of Meidingu Senbi Kiyamba (1467–1507) the ancient Meitei faith, Sanamahism, began to collapse. It was during his reign that the Brahmin people migrated to the kingdom and the volume of Vaishnavists proceeded with the worship of the Pheiya (sacred stone from Pong kingdom) as the Hindu God Vishnu. This was the origin of Meitei Vaishnavism.

Kuranganayani was a Manipuri princess who became queen of Ahom in 1768.

During the reign of king Gharib Niwaz (born Pamheiba, 1709–1748), the name of the kingdom was changed from Kangleipak to Manipur. It was during his regime the religion of the entire Meitei ethnicity was forcibly converted from Sanamahism into Hinduism. In 1729, the legendary burning of the sacred scriptures of Sanamahism took place during the reign of Gharib Niwaz. This event is annually commemorated during the Puya Meithaba.

=== Modern ===
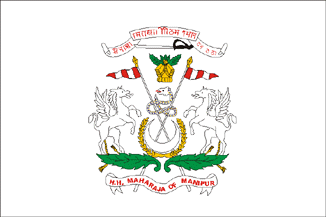
Appearance of the Coat of arms of Manipur in the Flag of Manipur

The history of modern Manipur covers the history of Manipur from the Seven Years Devastation to the Burmese Empire and to the present day.

==== Seven Years Devastation ====
The Burmese invaded Manipur several times but the most notable one was in 1819, during the reign of King Marjit. The Burmese occupied Manipur from 1819 to 1826. During this time, Manipur was devastated and there was chaos and anarchy everywhere. This dark period is called Chahi Taret Khuntakpa (Seven Years Devastation).

==== Manipuri Levy ====
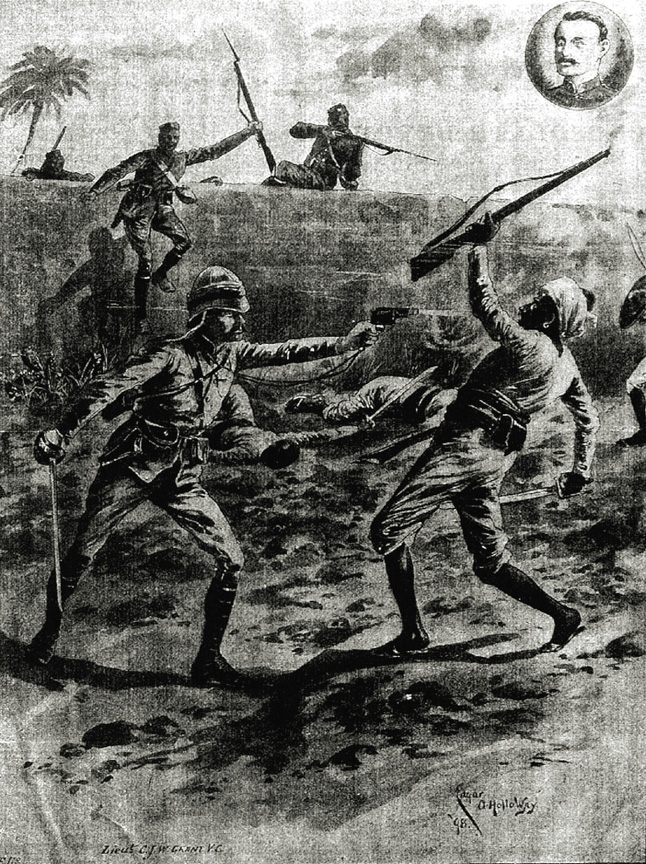
Action by Lieutenant CJW Grant, VC, at Thobal, Manipur, 1 April 1891.

There were exploitations of the Manipuri Levy, which was the first standing army of Manipur, born out of the Manipur National Struggle against the Burmese rule during the Seven Years Devastation.

==== Anglo-Manipuri War ====
In the year 1891, the historic Anglo-Manipuri war (Manipur's National Liberation Struggle) took place. The Manipuri soldiers showed their might in the losing battle, sacrificing their lives for the motherland. The combat ended with a British victory.

==== Japanese bombing ====
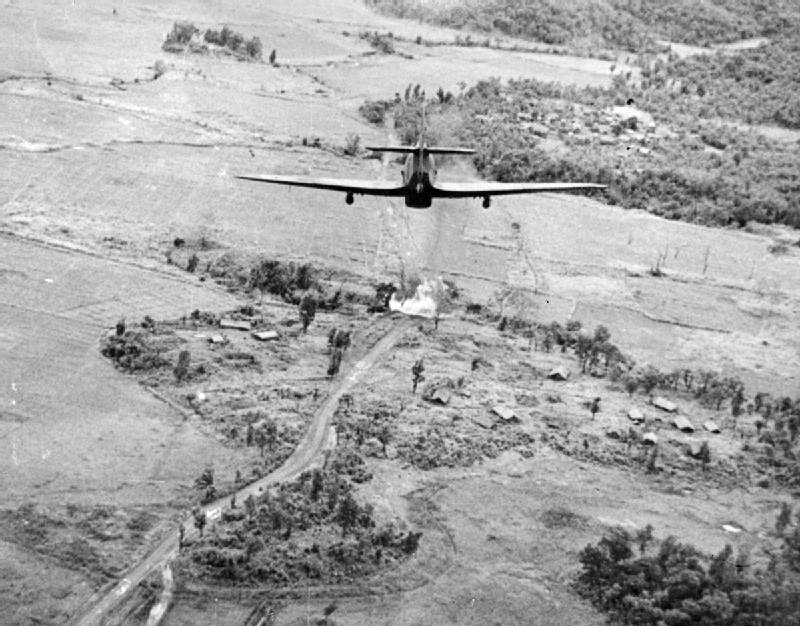
May 1944, a Royal Air Force Hawker Hurricane IIC of No. 42 Squadron RAF based at Kangla, Manipur, piloted by "Chowringhee" Campbell, attacking a bridge near a small Burmese settlement.

Japanese bombing in Imphal took place several times in the history of Manipur, thereby creating high casualties to the people of Manipur. The first bombing was in the year 1942, heralding the beginning of the Second World War in Manipur.

== See also ==
- Emblem of Manipur
- Manipur (princely state)
- Human rights abuses in Manipur

== Bibliography ==
- Beemer, Bryce (2013). The creole city in mainland Southeast Asia: Slave gathering warfare and cultural exchange in Burma, Thailand and Manipur, 18th – 19th c. (Thesis). University of Hawai'i at Manoa. ProQuest 1513230576.
- Harvey, G. E. (1925). History of Burma: From the Earliest Times to 10 March 1824. London: Frank Cass & Co. Ltd – via archive.org.
- Hazarika, Manjil (2017). Prehistory and Archaeology of Northeast India: Multidisciplinary Investigation in an Archaeological Terra Incognita. Oxford University Press. doi:10.1093/oso/9780199474660.001.0001. ISBN 978-0-19-947466-0.
- Brandt, Carmen (5 December 2017). "Writing off domination: the Chakma and Meitei script movements". South Asian History and Culture. 9: 116–140. doi:10.1080/19472498.2017.1411050. ISSN 1947-2498. S2CID 148911026.
- Naorem, Naorem Malemsanba (2015). "Centrality of body politics in Thokachanba's script and cultural revivalism in Manipur". In Noni, Arambam; Sanatomba, Kangujam (eds.). Colonialism and Resistance: Society and State in Manipur. London: Routledge. doi:10.4324/9781315638317. ISBN 9781315638317.
- Parratt, Saroj Nalini Arambam (2005). The Court Chronicle of the Kings of Manipur: The Cheitharon Kumpapa : Original Text, Translation, and Notes. London: Routledge. ISBN 0-415-34430-1.
- Post, Mark W.; Burling, Robbins (2017). "The Tibeto-Burman Languages of Northeast India". In LaPolla, Randy J.; Thurgood, Graham (eds.). The Sino-Tibetan Languages (2 ed.). Routledge. pp. 213–242. ISBN 978-1-138-78332-4.
- Sebastian, Rodney (2019). Cultural Fusion in a Religious Dance Drama: Building the Sacred Body in the Manipuri Rāslīlās (Thesis). University of Florida. ProQuest 2464172212.
