= Myothit, Sagaing Region =

Myothit မြို့သစ်
- Town
- Location in Myanmar
- Coordinates: 24.5177°N 94.5174°E
- Country: Myanmar
- Region: Sagaing Region
- District: Tamu
- Township: Tamu Township
- Elevation: 590 ft (180 m)

Population (2014)
  - Total: 1,642
- Time zone: UTC+6.30 (MST)

Myothit (မြို့သစ်) is a town in the Kabaw Valley in the Sagaing Region in north-west Myanmar near the border with the Indian state of Manipur. It is a substantial town of the Kabaw Valley and the seat of administration for the Myothit Sub-Township in the Tamu District.

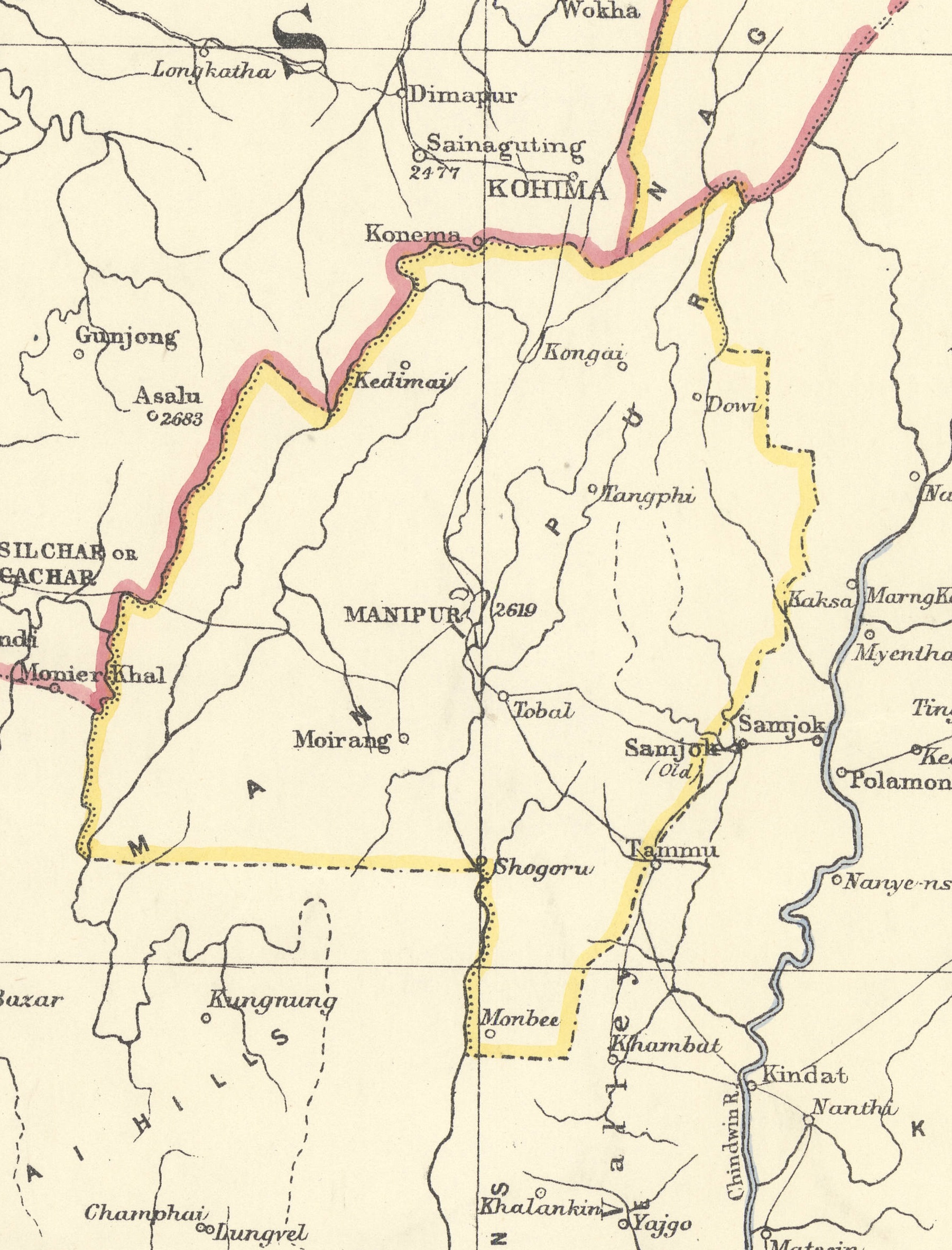
Old and new locations of Hsawnghsup (Samjok) headquarters to the east of Manipur in an 1891 British map

The town is at the confluence of Taret River that flows down from the eastern hills of Manipur and the Yu River that flows down the Kabaw Valley. A Survey of India map from 1891 places the old capital of Hsawnghsup (Somsok or Samjok, (Note: The name was spelt "Somsok" in Manipur Chronicles, and "Samjok" in British records.) a Shan state) here. The 'Machi route' was used historically to reach Heirok in the Manipur valley from this location. According to British commissioner Pemberton, a three-day boat journey down the Yu River took one to the junction with the Khampat River (Nampalaw River), and perhaps another day's journey to the Chindwin River. The route was used for transportation of goods between Hsawnghsup and the rest of Burma.

Hsawnghsup was a tributary state of Manipur from the 15th century till 1812, when prince Marjit Singh ceded it the Konbaung kingdom in return for his installation as the king of Manipur. In 1824, prince Gambhir Singh recaptured it as part of the First Anglo-Burmese War, but the British Raj reinstated it to the Konbaung kingdom. Afterwards, the capital of the state was moved to the present town of Thaungdut on the Chindwin River. (Note: "Thaungdut" or Thaung Thut" is the Burmese spelling for Hsawnghsup.)
