= Loibi Tharangamba =

Loibi Tharangamba (ꯂꯣꯏꯕꯤ ꯊꯥꯔꯥꯉꯝꯕ) was a Meitei queen of King Thawanthaba of the Ningthouja dynasty in 13th-century Kangleipak (early Manipur Kingdom). She is notably mentioned as a supporting but important character in the classical Meitei historical-literary work Thawanthaba Hiran, known for her role in the palace intrigues that contributed to the tragic downfall of Queen Khayoiron Tangja Samphabi and the outbreak of the Khuman–Meitei War.

Though not a central figure in the narrative, Loibi Tharangamba’s presence in the royal household provides a significant backdrop to the jealousy and rivalry among the queens of the Meitei king. As one of the senior queens in Thawanthaba’s extensive harem, Loibi Tharangamba represents the complexities of female rivalry and hierarchical power within the palace.

== Role in the Thawanthaba Hiran ==
Queen Loibi Tharangamba does not act directly in the primary conflict of the story, but her maidservant, Akong Langmeisu, is responsible for the fateful act that sets the tragedy in motion.

Akong Langmeisu, loyal to her mistress, is depicted as a tale-bearer and instigator who seeks to undermine the Meitei king's new and favored queen, Khayoiron Tangja Samphabi, the Khuman princess. She deliberately places a bunch of flowers, once belonging to the king’s younger brother, beside Samphabi’s pillow, leading King Thawanthaba to suspect an affair and order her execution.

While the text does not indicate that Loibi Tharangamba explicitly instructed this act, the implication of jealous tension between the established queens and the newcomer is clear. The incident shows the fragile coexistence of co-wives in a polygamous royal household, where influence, attention, and power were often contested.

== Court dynamics and jealousy ==
Loibi Tharangamba’s character shows the feelings of the senior queens of the Meitei court who felt threatened by the rising prominence of younger or politically significant consorts such as Samphabi. Her position within the royal hierarchy had given her considerable access and influence, fueling court rivalries.

== See also ==
- List of Khuman queens
- List of Khuman kings
- Khuman Kangleirol
- Moirang Kangleirol
- Ningthourol Lambuba
- Cheitharol Kumbaba
