= Khampat =

- Town
- Location in Sagaing Region, Burma
- Coordinates: 23.782303°N 94.144248°E
- Country: Myanmar
- Division: Sagaing
- District: Tamu
- Township: Tamu
- Control: People's Defense Force

Area
  - Total: 12.87 sq mi (33.33 km^{2})
- Elevation: 653 ft (199 m)

Population (2018)
  - Total: 20,500
  - Density: 1,590/sq mi (615/km^{2})
- Time zone: UTC+6:30 (MMT)

Khampat (ခမ်းပါတ်မြို့) (Note: Alternative spellings: Khambat, Khumbat, and Kumbat.) is a town in the Kabaw Valley in the Sagaing Region in western Myanmar. It is at the location where the Namsaweng River (Note: Alternative names: Namsailung in the Manipuri language and Tuipu in Kuki-Chin languages.) flows down from the hills and enters the Kabaw Valley. It is the site of a historical principality, which often changed hands between Manipur (now in India) and the Burmese kingdoms to the east.

The town is the principal town of Khampat Subtownship, an unofficial subdivision of Tamu Township used for administrative and statistical purposes. In 2014, the town had 14,559 inhabitants while the surrounding subtownship had 24,169 people.

== History ==
Historical reports indicate that the Kale-Kabaw valley used to have three principalities based at Thaungdut (also known as Sumjok), (Note: Alternative spellings: Samjot and Samsot.) Khampat, and Kale. (Note: Alternative spellings: Kule.) Thaungdut/Sumjok and Khampat were jointly invaded by King Kiyamba of Manipur and the king of Pong in 1467 CE, and divided among themselves. Khampat was at the time under the control of "Kyangs" (Chins, called Kukis in India). Khampat appears to have been Manipur's share in the division, and references to it can be found in the Manipur court chronicle Cheitharol Kumbaba.

During the course of history, the Kabaw Valley came under the control of Burma, which was confirmed by the British Raj after the First Anglo-Burmese War. Also in course of history, Tamu to the north of Khampat grew to be a centre of Indo-Burmese trade and a larger town, overshadowing Khampat.

Khampat is currently a sub-township within the Tamu Township.

On 7 November 2023 it was reported that the town had come fully under control of the People’s Defense Forces (PDF) during the ongoing civil war.

== Bibliography ==
- Grant Brown, G. E. R. (1913), Burmah Gazetteer: Upper Chindwin District, Volume A, Rangoon: Superintendent, Government Printing – via archive.org
- Parratt, Saroj Nalini Arambam (2005). The Court Chronicle of the Kings of Manipur: The Cheitharon Kumpapa, Volume 1. London: Routledge. ISBN 0-415-34430-1.
- Pau, Pum Khan (2019), Indo-Burma Frontier and the Making of the Chin Hills: Empire and Resistance, Taylor & Francis, ISBN 9781000507454
- Harvey, G. E. (1925). History of Burma: From the Earliest Times to 10 March 1824. London: Frank Cass & Co. Ltd – via archive.org.
- Siṃha, Kārāma Manimohana (1989), Hijam Irabot Singh and Political Movements in Manipur, B.R. Publishing Corporation, ISBN 978-81-7018-578-9
