= Hsawnghsup =

Former Shan state in Burma

Coordinates: 24°26′N 94°42′E

- State of British Burma
- c. 15th century–1959
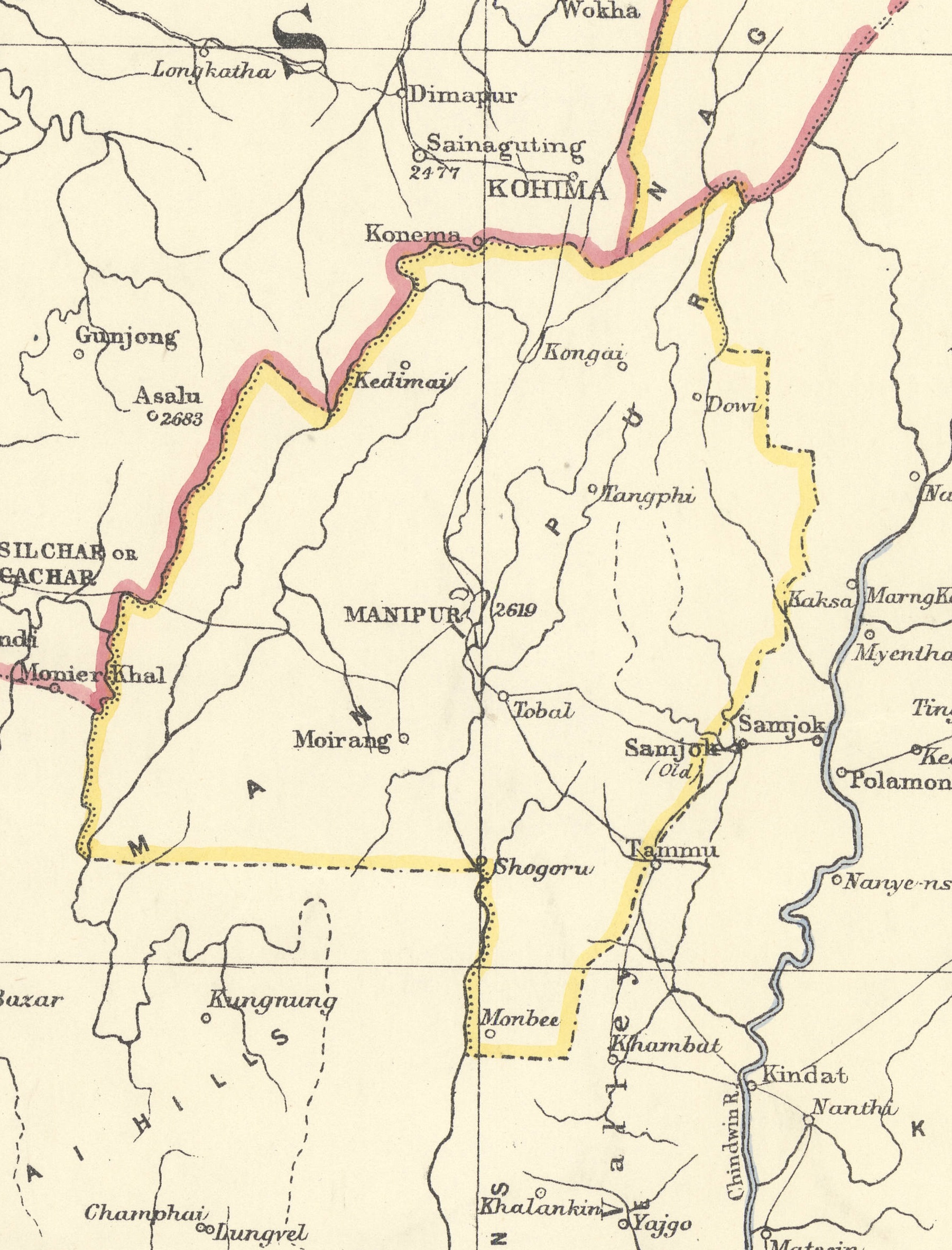
- Old and new locations of Hsawnghsup (Samjok) headquarters to the east of Manipur in an 1891 British map
- Capital: Thaungdut
- Area
  - 1901: 932 km^{2} (360 sq mi)
- Population
  - 1901: 7,471
- History
  - State founded: c. 15th century
  - Abdication of the last Saopha: 1959
Preceded by	Succeeded by
Kingdom of Burma	Shan State

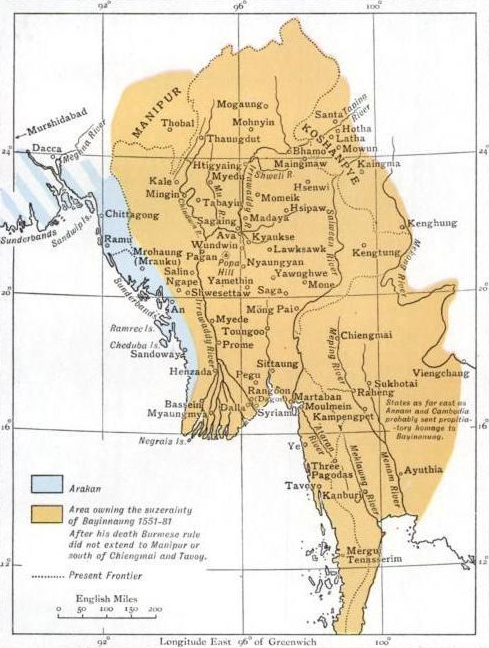
Hsawnghsup (Thaungdut) in a map of the Toungoo Kingdom

Hsawnghsup was one of the outlying Shan princely states in what is today Burma. It was called Somsok (Samjok) in Manipur Chronicles (Note: Alternative spellings: Samsok, Sumjok etc.) and Thaungthut by the Burmese. The latter name is now applied only to the final headquarters of the state, the seat of its Saopha (Sawbwa) in the 19th century. This town is on bank of the Chindwin River, but the original headquarters was apparently in the Kabaw Valley to the west, near the border with Manipur, and a good part of the state was also in that valley.

During the British rule in Burma, Hsawnghsup formed an exclave located to the northwest of the rest of the Shan States, within the Upper Chindwin District of British Burma and bound to the west by the princely state of Manipur. Most of the territory of the state was dense forest.

== History ==
According to the Manipur chronicles, king Kiyamba of Manipur and "Choupha Khekkhompa" of "Pong" (Möng Kawng) jointly conquered Hsawnghsup in 1470 CE and divided the state between themselves. From the time of Bayinnaung of Toungoo dynasty, the Burmese contested the Manipuri claim, until it was finally ceded to Burma by the British Raj in 1834.

The local legendary history claimed that the state existed as far back as three centuries before the appearance of the Buddha Gautama.

In 1886 the ruler of Hsawnghsup remained loyal to the British during the rebellion of the prince of Wuntho.

== Rulers ==
The rulers of Hsawnghsup bore the title of Saopha.

=== Saophas ===
- 843BC - 796BC Hso Hon Hpa (Azathathat) 1st
- 796BC - 776BC Hso Noeng Hpa (son)
- 776BC - 743BC Hso Pat Hpa (younger brother)
- 743BC - 726BC Hso Hkam Hpa (son)
- 726BC - 694BC Sao Hseng Pan Lam (son)
- 694BC - 650BC Sao Kyet Hpa (son)
- 650BC - 623BC Sao Tep Sam Ta (son)
- 623BC - 600BC Sao Kyet Kyaing (son)
- 600BC - 543BC Hso Le Hpa (son)
- 543BC - 522BC Hso Hkai Hpa (son)
- 522BC - 500BC Hso Vien Hpa (son)
- 500BC - 474BC Hso Hkuan Hpa (son)
- 474BC - 442BC Hso Tew Hpa (son)
- 442BC - 426BC Hso Yiam Hpa (son)
- 426BC - 394BC Hso Tam Hpa (son)
- 394BC - 354BC Hso Hsam Hpa (son)
- 354BC - 325BC Vacant
- 325BC - 283BC Hso Ngaan Hpa, (the son of Gawmonna of Razagyo objected by Thiri Dhamma Thawka of Palalipot)
- 283BC - 250BC Hso Hkong Hpa (son)
- 250BC - 216BC Hso Long Hpa (son)
- 216BC - 184BC Hso Lem Hpa (son)
- 184BC - 160BC Hso Loong Hpa (son)
- 160BC - 136BC Hso Kawn Hpa (son)
- 136BC - 116BC Hso Sam Hpa (son)
- 116BC - 84BC Hso Yap Hpa (son)
- 84BC - 52BC Hso Waing Hpa (son)
- 52BC - 28BC Hso Moew Hpa (son)
- 28BC - 01 Hso Goe Hpa (son)
- 01 - 27 Hso Xing Hpa (uncle)
- 27 - 59 Hso Gam Hpa (son)
- 59 - 91 Hso Pot Hpa (nephew)
- 91 - 116 Hso Pap Hpa (son)
- 116 - 154 Hso Yew Hpa (uncle)
- 154 - 176 Hso Hung Möng (son)
- 176 - 214 Hso Yawng Hpa (son)
- 214 - 244 Hso Nguen Hpa (son)
- 244 - 294 Hso Koen Hpa (son)
- 294 - 316 Hso Kat Hpa (son)
- 316 - 346 Hso Piam Hpa (son)
- 346 - 386 Hso Paw Hpa (son)
- 386 - 417 Hso Len Hpa (son)
- 417 - 446 Hso Liu Hpa (son)
- 446 - 471 Hso Hlaing Hpa (son)
- 471 - 506 Hso Kyoem Möng Hpa (son)
- 506 - 546 Hso Hken Hpa (son)
- 546 - 566 Hso Ween Hpa (younger brother)
- 566 - 583 Hso Tuen Hpa (nephew)
- 583 - 613 Hso Koong Hpa (son)
- 613 - 650 Hso Tue Hpa (son)
- 650 - 674 Hso Yawk Hpa (younger brother)
- 674 - 703 Hso Sawn Hpa (son)
- 703 - 746 Hso Hkwa Hpa (nephew)
- 746 - 762 Hso Hkaeng Hpa (son)
- 762 - 794 Hso Ham Hpa (son)
- 794 - 816 Hso Hang Hpa (son)
- 816 - 847 Hso Hit Hpa (son)
- 847 - 867 Hso Huan Hpa (son)
- 867 - 904 Hso Hueng Hpa (son)
- 904 - 934 Hso Hom Hpa (son)
- 934 - 964 Hso Waing Hpa (son)
- 964 - 1000 Hso Kert Hpa (son)
- 1000 - 1024 Hso Ngaam Hpa (younger brother)
- 1024 - 1044 Hso Hsao Hpa (son)
- 1044 - 1077 Hso Kyem Hpa (son)
- 1077 - 1100 Hso Hki Hpa (son)
- 1100 - 1128 Hso Kuen Hpa (son)
- 1128 - 1144 Hso Myo Hpa (son)
- 1144 - 1177 Hso Hkaen Hpa (son)
- 1177 - 1200 Hso Pan Hpa (son)
- 1200 - 1234 Hso Soen Hpa (son)
- 1234 - 1250 Hso Yawn Hpa (son)
- 1250 - 1270 Hso Yao Hpa (son)
- 1270 - 1298 Hso Hua Hpa (son)
- 1298 - 1316 Hso Mao Hpa (son)
- 1316 - 1350 Hso Than Hpa (son)
- 1350 - 1380 Hso Wak Hpa (son)
- 1380 - 1412 Hso Saw Hpa (younger brother)
- 1412 - 1436 Hso Het Pang Hpa (son)
- 1436 - 1445 Hso Hkoen Möng (son)
- 1445 - 1460 Hso Kaa Hpa (son)
- 1460 - 1474 Hso Hsong Phout (son)
- 1474 - 1498 Hso Hung Möng (son)
- 1498 - 1514 Hso Parn Möng (son)

Toungoo period

- 1514 - 1532 Hso Phon Hpa (son)
- 1532 - 1560 Hso Hkoe Hpa (nephew)

Colonized of Bayinnaung

- 1560 - 1570 Hso Hkan Hpa (uncle)
- 1570 - 1592 Hso Hkaing Hpa (son of Hso Hkoe Hpa)

He betrayed King Nanda Bayin of Hanthawaddy to joint with Hso Hsu Hpa, the saopha of Sanda in Koshanpye they seized later and send to Hanthawaddy the Burmese King decided to execution them but remit later

- 1592 - 1612 Hso Doun Hpa (son)
- 1612 - 1628 Hso Kyaw Hpa (son)

He guided King Khagemba of Ningthouja to develop friendly relationships with King Anaukpetlun the King of Burma until the Manipur King give her daughter Champajulee to married with Burmese King

- 1628 - 1650 Hso Htao Möng Doun (son)
- 1650 - 1659 Hso Lam Kawn Hkam Hpa (son)
- 1659 - 1663 Hso Soun Hpa (son)
- 1663 - 1689 Hso Pawng Hpa (son)
- 1689 - 1703 Hso Htan Hpa (younger brother)
- 1703 - 1727 Hso Hkoong Hpa (son)

He guided Taninganway of Inwa to develop friendly relationships with Ningthouja dynasty of Manipur until the Burmese King married with princess Chakpa Makhao Ngambi the younger sister of Pamhaiba (She was the daughter of Tonsen Ngampa or King Chalailongba aka Pitambar)
The both have son name Min Taya Sinthu Ngamba and daughter name Dimourathi

- 1727 - 1746 Hso Ming Hpa (son)
- 1746 - 1757 Hso Phoo Dam Hpa (younger brother)

Konbaung period

- 1757 - 1760 Sao Kan Haw (son)
- 1760 - 1767 Sao Hkun Sa (younger brother)
- 1767 - 1774 Sao Phon Gyi (son)
- 1774 - 1782 Sao Hti Kyeng (younger brother)
- 1782 - 1813 Sao Haw Nga (son of Sao Kan Haw)
- 1813 - 1826 Sao Leik Hkam (son)
- 1827 - 1858 Sao Aung Ba (Hso Kyeng Hpa) (son)

British period

- 1858 - 22 Oct 1880 Sao Shwe Möng (son)
- 1880 - 1893 Sao Nyi Hkam (son)
- 1893 - 1899 Sao Khine Mone (son)
- 1899 - 1908 Sir Sao Tun Aung (b. 1860) (younger brother)
- 1908 - 1959 Sao Hkun Hsawng or Sao Satta Meitta (last saopha) (son)

== Bibliography ==
- Grant Brown, G. E. R. (1913), Burmah Gazetteer: Upper Chindwin District, Volume A, Rangoon: Superintendent, Government Printing – via archive.org
- Parratt, Saroj Nalini Arambam (2005). The Court Chronicle of the Kings of Manipur: The Cheitharon Kumpapa, Volume 1. London: Routledge. ISBN 9780415344302.
- Parratt, Saroj Nalini Arambam (2009). The Court Chronicle of the Kings of Manipur: The Cheitharon Kumpapa, Volume 2. Foundation Books / Cambridge University Press India. ISBN 978-81-7596-854-7 – via Cambridge Core.
- Tarapot, Phanjoubam (2003), Bleeding Manipur, Har-Anand Publications, ISBN 978-81-241-0902-1
