= Robert Boileau Pemberton =

British colonial official and geographer

Agent to the Governor-General, Murshidabad
- In office 1840–1840

British commissioner to Manipur
- In office 1824–1835

Personal details
- Born: 21 June 1798 Nevis, West Indies
- Died: 26 June 1840 (aged 42) Murshidabad
- Parent: John Butler Pemberton (father)

Military service
- Allegiance: Great Britain
- Branch/service: Bengal Native Infantry
- Rank: Captain

Robert Boileau Pemberton (1798–1840) was a British army officer and, later, a political officer in British India. As a Lieutenant, he was sent as a junior commander of the British-funded Manipur Levy provided to prince Gambhir Singh of Manipur. He was instrumental in evicting the Burmese from Manipur during the First Anglo-Burmese War. Later, he was appointed as a commissioner for Manipur along with Captain Grant and the two negotiated the boundary with the Burmese commissioners. Pemberton demarcated the boundary between Manipur and the Kabaw Valley, which was ceded to Burma after the negotiations. It came to be known as the "Pemberton's Line". Pemberton was noted as a distinguished geographer. He surveyed the territory of Manipur and the surrounding country, and wrote a book titled Report on the Eastern Frontier of British India in 1835, which is a valuable early historical reference on the states of northeast India as well as Burma.

Later Pemberton was sent as a special envoy to Bhutan. He was appointed to the Indian Political Department in 1840 and served as the Agent to the Governor-General in Murshidabad. He died in Murshidabad.

== Early life ==
Boileau Pemberton was born on 21 June 1798 to John Butler Pemberton, a barrister and later the rector of a parish in West Indies. He entered the Indian Army in 1817 and was assigned to the 44th Native Infantry.

== Manipur ==
In 1819, the Burmese occupied Manipur, evicting its ruling prince Marjit Singh. The occupation lasted seven years. During this period, the Marjit Singh and his three brothers settled in the neighbouring Cachar and made multiple unsuccessful attempts to oust the Burmese.

After the Burmese occupied Assam and started threatening the states bordering British Bengal, the British declared war on Burma in 1824. The British proceeded on two fronts: a land invasion of Assam, which commenced immediately, and a naval invasion on the Burmese mainland starting in May 1824.

Gambhir Singh, a brother of Marjit Singh, who was also in exile in Cacher, obtained from David Scott, the Agent to the Governor-General for Assam, an allowance to raise a force of 500 men. The force was eventually increased to 2000 men, including cavalry, infantry and artillery, under the name 'Manipur Levy'. Captain F. J. Grant was appointed as its commander, with Pemberton, then a Lieutenant, as his assistant.

Along with Gambhir Singh and Pemberton, a force of 500 men left Sylhet on 17 May 1825 and arrived in the Manipur Valley on 10 June. They found that the Burmese had withdrawn and so the Valley was recaptured. More troops were brought in in December 1825, commanded by Captain Grant, and an advance was made to the Kabaw Valley. Again the Burmese forces were found to have withdrawn, and only the local forces were present. Two stockades at Tamu and Sumjok (Thaungdut) were taken, repossessing the Kabaw Valley.

The Anglo-Burmese War was soon concluded with the signing of the Treaty of Yandabo, and the Burmese agreed to relinquish control over Manipur. However, it soon became clear that they did not recognize Manipur's claim to the Kabaw Valley. Grant and Pemberton were dispatched as British boundary commissioners in 1828, to decide the boundary between Manipur and Burma. The Burmese boundary commissioners claimed that the border was at the "Ningthee river" (the Manipuri name of the Chindwin River) but that it was a different river from Chindwin claimed to be west of Kabaw Valley. The British officers believed that it was an attempt at deception.

A joint survey was then proposed for the following year, but the Burmese commissioners did not arrive. Thereafter, the British government ordered Grant and Pemberton to fix the boundary to the west of Chindwin. They did so, erecting boundary pillars. They also ordered all the Burmese subjects living in the disputed area to leave by 25 June 1930 or become Manipuri subjects.

Meanwhile, the British sent Major Henry Burney as the Resident to Burma, who discovered, upon his arrival at Ava, that tensions were very high regarding the Kabaw Valley. Upon his request, Pemberton was sent to Ava to represent Manipur's case. Pemberton took with him the Manipur chronicle as well as the Manipuri translation of a Shan chronicle (presumably that of Pong). There followed long and tedious discussions regarding the respective claims of the two states to the disputed valley.

Henry Burney conducted his own study of the Burmese records and became convinced of the Burmese claim. In the eventual memorandum sent to the British governor-general, he stated that the Kabaw Valley was in the possession of Burmese kings since 1370 and that, for 12 years prior to the outbreak of the war, it was in continuous Burmese possession. Further, he interpreted the Treaty of Yandabo to mean that Manipur was entitled to recover only those territories that it possessed before the conflict. Based on the force of Burney's argument as well as the apparent seriousness of the Burmese claim, the governor-general acceded to the cession of Kabaw Valley to Burma. The transfer took place on 9 January 1834. Grant and Pemberton were dispatched to define the boundary between Manipur and Burma along the Yomadong range, where it still lies. Manipur was compensated by the British government for the loss of its territory by an annual payment of Rs. 6,000.

=== Pemberton Line ===
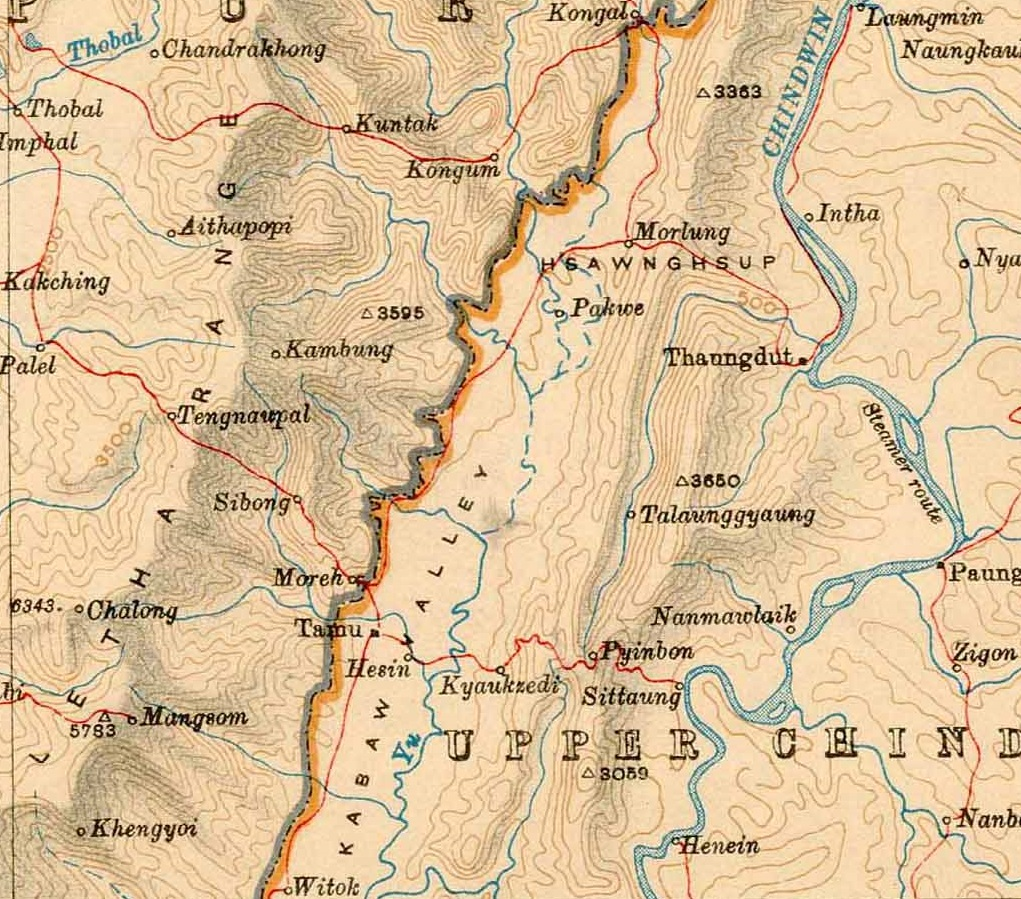
A portion of the Pemberton Line, the border between Manipur and Kabaw Valley

Pemberton was sent instructions to define the boundary in November 1834, along with Captain Grant, to lie at the foot of the Yomadong range (called Maring Hills in Manipur), which lies immediately to the west of Kabaw Valley. They were met by the Burmese commissioners, who requested further adjustments, which were firmly denied. The Burmese also objected to the Moreh thannah, which was very close to the proposed boundary. They were told that Manipur had as much right to establish posts on its side of the boundary as the Burmese had to their side. The Burmese also asked for consultation with the tribes living on the eastern slope of the Yomadong range, which was also denied for being inconsistent with the instructions of the British government. Eventually the boundary was laid down and agreement prepared, along with a Burmese translation. Upon Burmese request, a note was added at the bottom stating that a "small strip of country between the eastern base of the Yoma Doung range and the Muring Hills" would be later addressed by the Burmese ministers. But the court of Ava accepted the boundary as laid down.

The agreement also included a line to serve as portion of the southern boundary of Manipur, which came to be called "Pemberton's imaginary line". Pemberton's inquiries showed that the southern boundary of Kabaw Valley was at a river called Numsailung by Manipuris (Namsaweng in Burmese and Tuipu in Kuki-Chin). So he included in the agreement an imaginary line running west from the point where Numsailung enters the plains, across the mountains up to the Manipur River. In reality much of this territory was under the control of Chin tribes at that time, and it was not part of Manipur. But it did influence the British thinking in later times and, when a proper boundary between Manipur and Chin Hills was defined in 1894, it was drawn very close to Pemberton's imaginary line.

== Personal life ==
He married Henrietta Peach McLeod, daughter of General McLeod. The couple had a son, Robert Charles Boileau Pemberton, who also served in the Indian Army and rose to Major-General.

Pemberton died in 1840 while serving in Murshidabad. He was survived by his wife, Henrietta. She died on 10 July 1854 at her father's residence in Sussex at the age of 43.

== Bibliography ==
- Grant Brown, G. E. R. (1913), Burmah Gazetteer: Upper Chindwin District, Volume A, Rangoon: Superintendent, Government Printing – via archive.org
- Banerjee, A. C. (1946) [1943], The Eastern Frontier of British India, 1784–1826 (Second ed.), Calcutta: A. Mukherjee – via archive.org
- Hall, D. G. E. (1974), Henry Burney – A Biography, Oxford University Press – via archive.org
- Hodson, T. C. (1908), The Meitheis, London: David Nutt – via archive.org
- Ibochou Singh, Khwairakpam (1985). British administration in Manipur 1891–1947. University (PhD thesis). Gauhati University. hdl:10603/66697 – via Shodhganga.
- Johnstone, Sir James (1896), My Experiences in Manipur and the Naga Hills, London: Sampson Low, Marston and Company – via archive.org
- Mackenzie, Alexander (2012), History of the Relations of the Government with the Hill Tribes of the North-East Frontier of Bengal, Cambridge University Press, ISBN 978-1-108-04606-0
- Pau, Pum Khan (2019), Indo-Burma Frontier and the Making of the Chin Hills: Empire and Resistance, Taylor & Francis, ISBN 9781000507454
- Tarapot, Phanjoubam (2003), Bleeding Manipur, Har-Anand Publications, ISBN 978-81-241-0902-1
