= Chingkhei Thanbi =

Queen consort of Punshi Purenhanba

Chingkhei Thanbi (ꯆꯤꯡꯈꯩ ꯊꯥꯟꯕꯤ) was a Meitei princess, the daughter of King Thawanthaba of the Ningthouja dynasty, and became queen of the Khuman dynasty through her marriage to King Punshi Purenhanba (shortly known as Punshiba) in the 13th century CE. She is known for her tragic fate during the violent conflict between the Meitei (Ningthouja) and Khuman kingdoms in ancient Kangleipak (early Manipur). Her life and death are central to the classical Meitei literary work Thawanthaba Hiran, which combines historical realism with poetic narrative. She is remembered for her dignity, sacrifice, and the suffering she endured in the name of political alliance.

== Background ==
Chingkhei Thanbi was the daughter of King Thawanthaba of the Meitei kingdom. Her marriage to the Khuman king Punshiba was part of a diplomatic exchange to solidify peace between the two historically rival clans, the Meiteis and the Khumans. As part of this alliance, Khayoiron Tangja Samphabi, the daughter of King Punshiba, was married to Thawanthaba.

Both women were sent to the opposite courts with rich dowries and ceremonial honors, symbolizing mutual trust and the hope for lasting peace between the two dynasties.

== Marriage and royal life ==
As a royal consort in the Khuman court, Chingkhei Thanbi fulfilled her duties with loyalty and grace. She gave birth to a child by King Punshiba, further cementing the familial bond between the two royal houses.

However, the fragile peace was soon shattered by the tragic execution of her Khuman counterpart, Queen Samphabi, by King Thawanthaba. Samphabi had been falsely accused of infidelity and put to death by her husband without proper investigation. Her murder deeply enraged the Khuman king.

== Death ==
To avenge the death of his daughter Samphabi, King Punshiba planned a campaign under the pretense of a joint expedition with the Meiteis. Chingkhei Thanbi, having some foresight into the unfolding conspiracy, was forced to send a message to her father, warning him to retreat quickly. Her intervention allowed the Meitei king to narrowly escape an ambush.

Upon discovering her actions, King Punshiba accused Thanbi of betrayal. Ignoring her pleas and affirmations of loyalty, he ordered her execution using the same type of weapon that had killed his daughter, a sharp iron rod. Her death was especially brutal, and her lifeless body was returned to the Meitei court.

== Character and legacy ==
Chingkhei Thanbi is portrayed as a tragic heroine, loyal, wise, and brave under pressure. Unlike Khayoiron Samphabi, whose end came swiftly, Thanbi's suffering was prolonged. She endured emotional trauma, physical torture, and the moral burden of being caught between two feuding families.

Her final days are described with pathos, a mother torn from her child, a daughter forced into complicity, and a woman condemned despite her innocence. Thanbi's story is a powerful symbol of the human cost of political alliances and revenge-driven conflict.

== In literature ==
Chingkhei Thanbi is a major character in Thawanthaba Hiran, a pioneering historical narrative in ancient Meitei literature. The work presents her life with psychological depth, using realistic dialogue and emotional imagery. Thanbi's character stands as a representation of female suffering and moral strength in a male-dominated royal world. Along with Khayoiron Tangja Samphabi, she is remembered as one of the two queens whose deaths changed the course of inter-clan relations in early Manipur.

== See also ==
- List of Khuman queens
- List of Khuman kings
- Khuman Kangleirol
- Moirang Kangleirol
- Ningthourol Lambuba
- Cheitharol Kumbaba

== Bibliography ==
- Khelchandra Singh, Ningthoukhongjam (1980). Khuman Kangleirol (in Manipuri). India: Digital Library of India; Internet Archive.
- Kullachandra Sharma, B (1998). Khuman Ningthouron Lambuba (in Manipuri). India: Digital Library of India; Internet Archive.
- Ibobi, Laikhuram (1998). Khuman Kangleiron Amasung Laikhuram Shageigee Meihouron (in Manipuri). India: Digital Library of India; Internet Archive.
- Kullachandra, B. (1989-03-15). Khumal Ningthourol Lambuba (in Manipuri). India: Digital Library of India; Internet Archive.
