= Akong Langmeisu =

Akong Langmeisu (ꯑꯀꯣꯡ ꯂꯥꯡꯃꯩꯁꯨ) was a maidservant in the Meitei royal court during the 13th century Kangleipak (early Manipur). She is known for her role in the tragic events depicted in the classical Meitei literary work Thawanthaba Hiran. She is remembered in Meitei cultural memory as the figure whose deceitful actions led to the wrongful execution of Queen Khayoiron Tangja Samphabi, sparking the Khuman–Meitei War.

Akong Langmeisu's character shows the destructive consequences of palace intrigue, jealousy, and manipulation, and she remains one of the most controversial figures in early Meitei literature (old Manipuri literature).

== Historical and literary context ==
Akong Langmeisu appears in the historical narrative Thawanthābā Hiran, a seminal literary work that blends history and drama in showing the 13th-century conflict between the Meitei (Ningthouja) and Khuman dynasties. Though a secondary character, her actions serve as a major catalyst for the events that follow.

While the story is largely drawn from actual history, it is told through a literary lens, and Akong Langmeisu’s role is often interpreted symbolically, as a warning against envy and courtly deception.

== Role in the tragedy ==
Akong Langmeisu was a maidservant of Queen Loibi Tharangamba, one of the queen consorts of King Thawanthaba. She is described as a tale-bearer and malicious courtier, motivated by jealousy or loyalty to her mistress. Her involvement in the tragedy began when she found a lost bunch of flowers, previously owned by the king’s younger brother Leishapamba Tougaingamba, a known admirer of flowers.

Instead of returning the flowers to the real owner, she deliberately put them near the pillow of Queen Khayoiron Tangja Samphabi, the Khuman princess recently married to the Meitei king's harem. Upon discovering the flowers, the Meitei king became consumed by jealousy, suspecting an illicit relationship between Samphabi and his brother.

Despite the queen’s passionate pleas of innocence, Thawanthaba remained unmoved, and ordered her brutal execution. This act, based entirely on the false implication set by Langmeisu’s action, would go on to ignite the Khuman–Meitei War.

Later in the narrative, Akong Langmeisu reappears unexpectedly in the dead of night, carrying a torch, and testifies falsely against Queen Samphabi. She swears that the flowers found near the queen’s bed closely resembled those worn by the prince, further sealing the queen's fate.

== See also ==
- List of Khuman queens
- List of Khuman kings
- Khuman Kangleirol
- Moirang Kangleirol
- Ningthourol Lambuba
- Cheitharol Kumbaba
