= Thawanthaba Hiran =

The Thawanthaba Hiran (ꯊꯋꯥꯟꯊꯥꯕ ꯍꯤꯔꯥꯟ) is a Classical Meitei historical tragedy based narrative epic literary work, rooted in a crime of passion. It is considered one of the earliest examples of realism in ancient Meitei literature, drawing from historical events rather than traditional Meitei folktales. Thawanthaba Hiran is a landmark in early Meitei literature. It introduced historical subjects, realistic narrative techniques, complex character portrayals, extended prose, rich vocabulary, and natural dialogue, in a new era of literary expression in the Meitei civilisation.

== Background ==
The story is set during the reign of Meitei King Thawanthaba (1195–1231 CE), whose intense but unwise affection led to jealousy and conflict. Historically, the Meiteis (here, Ningthoujas) and Khumans were rival clans in ancient Kangleipak (early Manipur), although there were occasional periods of peace.

=== Marriage alliance ===
In a rare moment of goodwill, King Thawanthābā married Khayoiron Tangja Samphabi, daughter of Khuman King Punshiba. In exchange, the Meitei king's daughter, Chingkhei Thanbi married into the Khuman royal family. Both alliances were celebrated with lavish gifts, and both brides were warmly welcomed by their new families.

=== Fatal incident ===
During a royal festival, King Thawanthābā organized an archery competition and invited his flower-loving younger brother, Leishapamba Tougaingamba. However, the brother declined, upset over a headdress flower he had lost. That flower was found by Akong Langmeisu, a maid of another Meitei queen named Loibi Tharangamba, who planted it in the queen’s bedchamber. When the king discovered the flower next to his young Khuman princess (Meitei queen) at night, he accused her of infidelity and executed her without hearing her pleas.

=== Escalation of violence ===
The Khuman king, Punshiba, discovered the murder weapon during funeral rites and invited Thawanthābā to join an expedition, planning revenge. The Meitei princess (Khuman queen) warned her father, but Meitei forces prevailed and captured a Khuman leader’s head. In response, the Khuman king arranged the execution of the Meitei king’s daughter in a similarly violent manner. This provoked further retaliation, both sides engaged in ambushes and battles marked by treachery, surprise attacks, and massacres.

== Characters ==
- Thawanthābā: A passionate and impulsive Meitei king of the Ningthouja dynasty, skilled in diplomacy but prone to jealousy. His traits are portrayed in full complexity, from loving husband and strategist to ruthless warrior.
- Khayoiron Tangja Samphabi: The Khuman princess, innocent and eloquent, who refused to falsely confess her innocence. Her pleas and torture are vividly described.
- Chingkhei Thanbi: The Meitei king’s daughter, whose suffering is prolonged after her father’s forces killed her in retaliation.
- Leima Kuchukoibi: A Khuman court-lady who bore a child by Thawanthābā under promise that her son would be cared for, yet that promise was broken, and the child later died during the conflict.
- Supporting heroes: Courageous warriors and scouts emerge on both sides, including a disguised informant and a daring decoy who lured enemies into ambush.

== Plot and style ==
- Realism: The work is notable for its realistic portrayal of structure and character development, with no supernatural elements.
- Themes: Jealousy and honor drive the plot, reminiscent of Othello. The narrative is historical and tragic.
- Length and style: Longer and more elaborate than earlier Manipuri works, with rich diction, extended descriptions, and vivid similes.
- Dialogues are vivid: Animated speeches show depths into the emotions and motivations of characters.
- Imagery: Metaphors compare heroes to hawks, bamboo, or warlike deities; violent scenes are described with stark, natural comparisons.

== Funeral customs ==
The story also preserves historical funeral rites of the Meitei civilisation before the arrival of Hindu cultural influence, initial burial followed by exhumation and bone-washing for reburial.

== See also ==
- List of Khuman queens
- List of Khuman kings
- Khuman Kangleirol
- Moirang Kangleirol
- Ningthourol Lambuba
- Cheitharol Kumbaba
