= Ningthou Khomba =

- King of Kangleipak

King of Kangleipak
- Monarchy: 1432 CE - 1467 CE
- Predecessor: Meitei Ningthou Punshiba
- Successor: Senbi Kiyamba

Suzerain of Moirang
- Suzerainty: 1432 CE - 1456 CE
- Deposed predecessor: Iwang Puriklai Sanahongba
- Vassal successor: Iwang Puriklai Khenjang Chaiba
- Died: 1467 CE
- Issue: Senbi Kiyamba, Sanongba Lalumkhomba
- House: Ningthouja dynasty
- Father: Meitei Ningthou Punshiba
- Mother: Yairumlon Lanbansu
- Religion: Sanamahism
- Occupation: King of Kangleipak

Ningthoukhomba or Ningthou Khomba (Meitei: ꯅꯤꯡꯊꯧ ꯈꯣꯃꯕ) was a Meitei king of the Ningthouja dynasty of Medieval Manipur who ruled from 1432 CE to 1467 CE. He completed the unification of the seven clans principalities by defeating the powerful Moirang kingdom. He was the conqueror of Tamu of the Kabaw Valley.

== Family and early life ==
Ningthou Khomba was the son and successor of the Meitei king Punshiba and Yairumlon Lanbansu of the Angom. He was termed as "a worthy son of a worthy father". When he ascended the throne, he aimed to expand the kingdom's borders through aggressive actions and by conquering neighboring areas. During his father's reign, the Ningthouja kingdom had already covered most of the Manipur valley and parts of the north-western, northern, and north-eastern hills. For the kingdom to grow, it had to engage in conflicts with the princely states in southern Manipur, Moirang country, or the Shan villages in the east and the western part of the Chindwin basin in Upper Burma.

== Conquests ==
=== Subjugation of Moirangs ===
During Ningthoukhomba's reign, out of the seven clan principalities, only Moirang was independent. The Meitei king, with help from others and the King of Tamu, invaded Moirang and took over its territory. In the battle, the Moirang king Sanahongba was removed from power. Ten people were captured, and many from Moirang fled due to the violence. As a result, Moirang remained in a desolate state for 24 years. The seven clan states were finally unified under the authority of the Ningthouja (Meitei) king.

However, the kingship of Moirang could not be abolished as the Thangjing Lai Haraoba was very important. Som Sanahongba's eldest son Khenjang Chaiba, as directed by Lord Thangjing, was recalled from the west (where he fled after the conquest by Meiteis) and appointed the king of Moirang by the Meitei king. Khenjang Chaiba held the office of Moirang king from 1456 CE to 1475 CE.

=== Expedition to Akla and raid by Tangkhuls ===
In 1443, Ningthou Khomba started a military campaign against Akla, a Shan principality. During this expedition, the queens of Ningthou Khomba and other palace women were moved to a village called Tangkham. Akla, occupied by the Kabaw Shans, was very wealthy. The Meitei forces attacked Akla from five directions, leading to many Kabaw Shans being killed. After their defeat, the Meitei king came home with many elephants as prizes of war.

While the king was away on the expedition to Akla, the Tangkhuls from the northeastern hills, led by their chief, attacked Tangkham. Their main goal was to take the rice stored in the large state granary by the clans. In response, Queen Linthoi Ngambi, the king's wife, put on royal male clothing, quickly gathered her long hair into a bun on her head, and wore her husband's kokyet. This helped hide her long hair and allowed her to impersonate the king. Other women of the king also dressed in male clothing.

Acting like royalty, Queen Linthoi Ngambi asked the Tangkhul chief why he had not supported the king in the expedition to Akla, from which he had just returned. As a hill chief loyal to the Meitei king, he was expected to help. The Tangkhuls were taken aback and asked for forgiveness. However, the 'king' ordered that the Tangkhuls be treated to wine. They were served so much that they drank too much and could barely stand. After this, they were captured.

When the real king returned from the successful campaign, there was a great celebration in the capital.

== Immigrations from the east and west ==
During the reign of King Ningthou Khomba, people migrated into Manipur from the east and west. Groups of Kabaw Shans were settled in the valley. They married local women and were gradually absorbed into Meitei society.

A man named Dharma Rai came to Manipur via Tripura during this time and settled there. His family remained separate from the local population for several generations. Later, his descendant Madhab Rai was accepted into Meitei society and, in 1570, was given a Manipuri surname (yumnak).

== Succession ==
After 35 years of reign, King Ningthou Khomba died in 1467. His son, Senbi Kiyamba succeeded him as the king of Kangleipak.
