= Ahlaw =

Village in Myanmar

- Location in Burma
- Coordinates: 24°5′0″N 94°21′0″E
- Country: Burma
- Division: Sagaing Region
- Township: Tamu Township

Population (2005)
  - Religions: Buddhism
- Time zone: UTC+6.30 (MST)

Ahlaw is a village in the Sagaing Region of north-west Myanmar. It lies in Tamu Township in the Tamu District.

== See also ==
- List of cities, towns and villages in Burma: A
