= Kingdom of Pong =

Legendary Shan kingdom

- Legendary kingdom of the Shan States
- 1st century–18th century (allegedly)
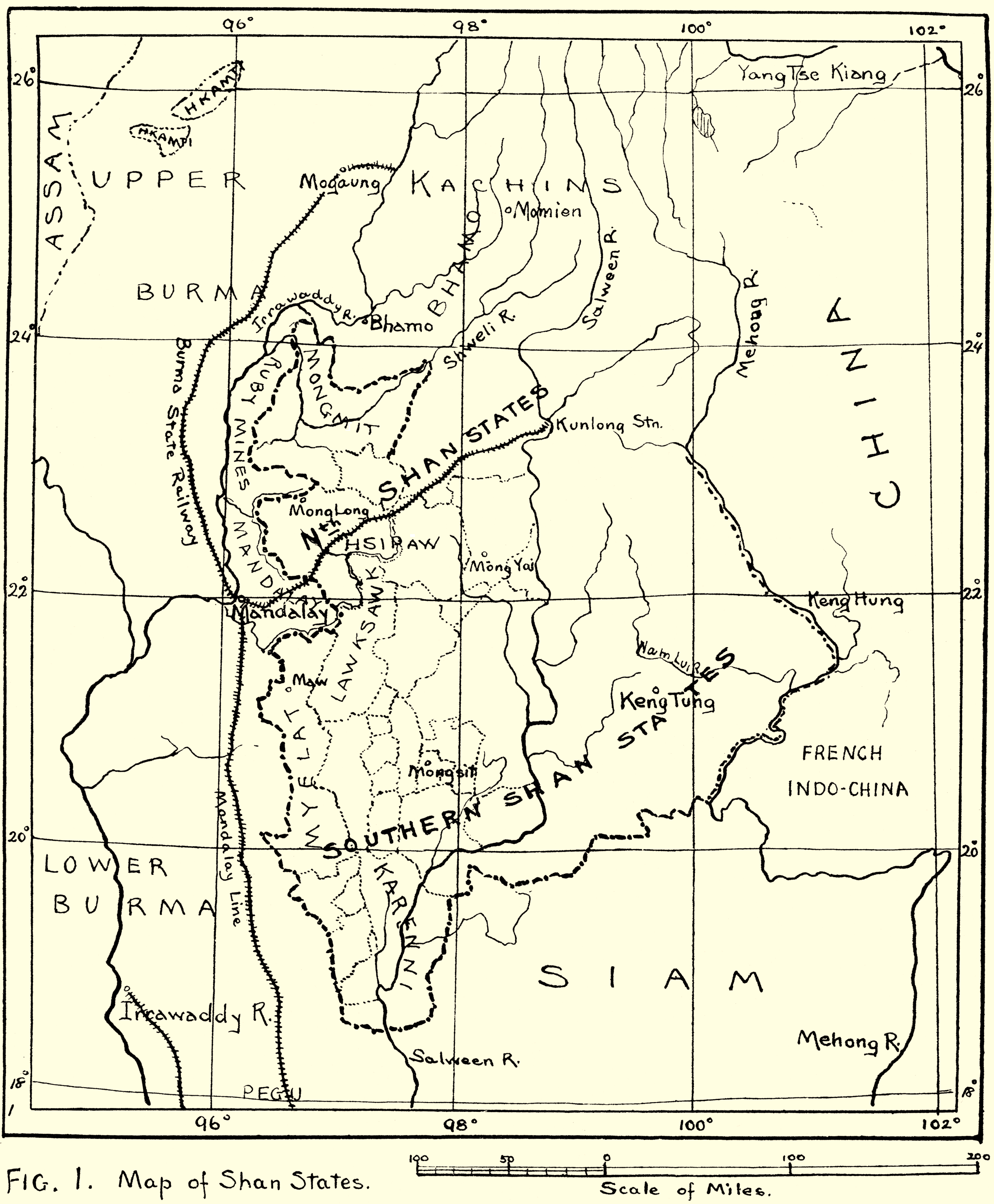
- 1917 map of the Burmese Shan States with Mogaung in the upper left corner
- Capital: Mogaung
- History
  - Legendary founding: 1st century
  - Disestablished: 18th century (allegedly)

The Kingdom of Pong, or Pong Kingdom, was a legendary Shan kingdom mentioned in Manipuri histories. When references to the kingdom were first discovered by Western historians, some scholars believed it was a powerful ancient Shan kingdom, previously unknown to the world. However, many modern scholars believe that it was never a separate kingdom and was simply a generic term for the regions inhabited by Shan people, which was later confounded with the Shan histories of Möng Mao and Möng Kawng.

It was bounded on the north by the mountain ranges that divide present-day Myanmar and Assam State, in the south by Khampat, reaching to Yunnan in the east and the Chin Hills in the west. Its capital was Mogaung, known by the Shan people as Möng Kawng.

== Discovery ==
The first document to propose the existence of the "Pong Kingdom" was Robert Boileau Pemberton's Report on the Eastern Frontier of British India. When Pemberton led his army to Manipur, a region on the border between British India and the Kingdom of Burma, he discovered an old Shan chronicle, which was translated into Manipuri and included in his report. In it, he noted that the Shan kingdom was established as early as the 1st century AD and that the territory it occupied at its height extended from Assam and Manipur in the west to Yunnan in the east. Since then, many people have wondered what the kingdom of Pong was, and were inclined to believe it was an ancient Shan empire.

Additionally, the kingdom of Pong was mentioned in the Cheitharol Kumbaba, the court chronicle of the kings of Manipur, but the descriptions were far less detailed than Pemberton's version.

== Legends and stories ==
Pemberton's account of the kingdom goes into great detail on the chronicle of the kingdom, from its first ruler in 80 AD, to its last in 1752 AD.

The Manipuri royal chronicle, titled Cheitharol Kumbaba, written much later, mentions an alliance between the Kangleipak State and the Kingdom of Pong. It also mentions that the King of Pong visited Imphal in 698 AD and resided for some time in the town. The king of Pong, Khek Khomba, together with king Senbi Kiyamba of Manipur, invaded Kyang Khambat in the Kabaw Valley in 1467.

== Disputed existence ==
Some scholars believe that "Pong" was an ancient kingdom which existed in the early history of Myanmar. William Wilson Hunt believed that Pong bordered Tripura, Yunnan and Siam, and that Möng Kawng was its capital. In his view, Pong was not destroyed by Myanmar until the mid-18th century. Arthur Purves Phayre also believed that Pong was a country established by the Tai people in the 1st century AD. Alexander Dalrymple mentioned in Oriental Repertory that there was a country called Pong around southeastern Assam and northwestern Myanmar in 1763. The orientalist Henry Yule also believed that there was a "Pong kingdom" in the Shan areas of northern Myanmar. Chinese scholar Zhu Changli believed that "Pong" was an early Shan country and that the Ahom kingdom had a deep connection with Pong. Huang Huikun called the Pong kingdom an "overlooked ancient Shan-Tai kingdom" and linked Pong with Möng Mao, arguing that the Shweli valley was the center of the Pong kingdom, and that "Möng Mao", "Pong", and "Kawsampi" were all just different names of the same ancient Tai kingdom. The book A Brief History of the Dai People believes that Pong was indeed a kingdom established by the ancestors of the Shan people, and believes that the different views of historians on the location of Pong reflected the "wide distribution of the ancient Shan people".

Other scholars disagree with this view and believe that "Pong" never truly existed as an independent kingdom. Edward Harper Parker believed that "Pong" was simply a name for the Tai-inhabited areas in Nanzhao and Dali. James George Scott agreed with this view, but Paul Pelliot opposited. Ney Elias believed that Pong referred to Möng Mao. G. E. Harvey believed that Pong referred to the various Tai regions between the Brahmaputra and Salween rivers, and that there was never a single, unified kingdom. The Chinese historian Fang Guoyu believed that the Pong kingdom "was probably based on legend". The Dehong scholar Yang Yongsheng believes that when the Ahom people of India traced their ancestral history (after migrating from Dehong), they called the country established by their ancestors "Pong", and the Pong kingdom was Möng Mao.

The Shan scholar Sao Saimong details many of the reasons why the "Pong Kingdom" never truly existed, and was simply another name for the kingdoms of Möng Mao and Möng Kawng. According to Pemberton's account, the capital of Pong was "Mongmaorong", called "Mogaung" in Burmese, but Sao Saimong states that this is a translation error, and that the capital of Pong should have originally been Möng Mao, and later Mogaung (called Möng Kawng in Shan). The first Pong king, "Khool-liee", is the same as the first Mao king "Kun-lai" mentioned in Ney Elias' "Introductory Sketch of the History of the Shans". Samlongpha's conquests and Songanpha's surrender to the Chinese are identical in the stories of Pong and Möng Mao, besides the dating. The history of Pong becomes the history of Möng Kawng during the reign of the Pong Queen, Songanpha's wife, who established her court at Mogaung. Wars occur at similar times in both stories, during the reign of kings with very similar names. The kingdom of Pong was finally subjugated by the Burmese in 1752 during the reign of "Chow Khoolseng", the same as the Möng Kawng king "Haw Seing" who submitted to Alaungpaya in the 1750s.

== Saophas ==
- Hkun Lee 80 AD (?) 1st
- 11 saophas ruled during after 80 AD - 667
- Murgnow (Möng Nawng) 667 - 777 13th
- Hso Hkam Hpa son of Möng Nawng 777 - 808 14th
- 808 - 1313 They have 10 saophas ruled
- Hso Ngan Hpa 1313 - 1334 25th
- 2nd Son of Hso Ngan Hpa 1334 - 1337
- 3rd Son Hso Ngan Hpa 1337 - 1365
- 4th Hso Oop Hpa 4th son of Hso Ngan Hpa 1364 - ?
- Hso Hung Hpa - nephew of Hso Oop Hpa ? - 1445
- Hso Hep Hpa (Hso Hung Hkum/ Sao Hoo Maw) 1445 - 1512/13
- Hso Penh Hpa 1512/13 - 1568
- Hso Ko Hpa 1568 - 1587
- Sao Kan Hkam 1587 - 1592
- Sao Ong Hkam (Hso Hung Hpa) 1592 - 1596
- 10 years interregnum 1596 - 1606
- 4 saophas ruled during 1617 - 1662
- A son of the King of Ava 1662 - 1672 probably of Pong Lineage
- 5 saophas ruled during 1672 - 1734 of Pong Lineage
- Sao Maw Hkam
- Sao Hkun Hseng

Cf. 1 to 6 with table of Mao Kings; 12 to 21 with that of Merng-gong (Bur. Mogaung) - assuming that from 1334 onwards that Pong is Merng-gong (Mogaung)

== See also ==
- Shan people
- Möng Mao
- Möng Kawng
- Shan States
- Manipur (princely state)
