= Angomlon Laihui =

The Angomlon Laihui (ꯑꯉꯣꯝꯂꯣꯟ ꯂꯥꯏꯍꯨꯏ) is a classical Meitei language historical chronicle of the kings of the Angom clan. It follows the style of two earlier Meitei royal chronicles: the Ningthourol Lambuba and the Moirang Ningthourol Lambuba. The Angomlon Laihui records the lives and achievements of the Angom kings. At the end of each king's story, the name of his mother is also mentioned.

== Language and style ==
Although the stories may have come from oral tradition, the use of non native words shows that the book was written during the Middle Period. The writing style is grand and complex, similar to the other two chronicles. It uses long and decorative sentences.

=== Description of an early king ===
One of the early Angom kings is described in a poetic way:

"Your grandfather who settled in Ongdei came down from the tall mountains of the moon. He traveled under a white canopy, carrying a bow, arrows, and a sword, followed by torch-bearers. In daylight, he came down the golden ladder, stepped on a marble platform, and became the ruler of Kanglei. He was later called the 'Conqueror of Tekhao' and known as 'Taret Senbung Lokpa', meaning 'one who collects gongs made of bell-metal'."

== Historical importance ==
The Angomlon Laihui suggests that an Angom king ruled before Nongda Lairen Pakhangba, the first king of the Ningthouja clan. This may explain why the coronation of an Angom king always happened before the coronation of a Meitei king. It may also explain why the Angom king was later given the central seat in the Meitei king's court.

== Cultural details ==
The book also gives information about how traditional houses were built. It mentions the custom of observing 'Married Woman's Day' during the month of Hiyanggei (October–November). This celebration is still practiced today and is called Ningol Chakouba (or, Ningon Chakkouba).

== See also ==
- Ancient Meitei literature
