= Ainggyi =

- Location in Burma
- Coordinates: 21°13′0″N 95°8′0″E
- Country: Burma
- Division: Mandalay Region
- Township: Nyaungu Township

Population (2005)
  - Religions: Buddhism
- Time zone: UTC+6.30 (MST)

Ainggyi is a village in the Mandalay Region of north-west Myanmar. It lies in Nyaungu Township in the Tamu District.

== See also ==
- List of cities, towns and villages in Burma: A
