= Meitei Ningthou Punshiba =

Punshiba
- King of Manipur

King of Manipur
- Monarchy: 1408 CE - 1432 CE
- Predecessor: Lairenba
- Successor: Ningthou Khomba
- Issue: Ningthou Khomba
Names
- Meitei Ningthou Punshiba, Meidingu Punshiba
- House: Ningthouja dynasty
- Father: Tabungba
- Mother: Lamphel Ngambee
- Religion: Sanamahism

Punshiba (Meitei: ꯄꯨꯟꯁꯤꯕꯥ) was a Meitei king of the Ningthouja dynasty of Medieval Manipur. He ruled from 1404 CE to 1432 CE.

== Family ==
Punshiba was a son of King Tabungba and Queen Lamphel Ngambee, and the younger brother of King Lairenba. His wife was Yairumlon Lanbasu of the Angoms.

== The Lanmi System ==
The foundation of the Lanmi system coincided with the establishment of a centralized administrative structure, notably during the reign of King Punshiba.

The military department created under Punshiba was called Shingchep Meira Haijouroi (Torch Swingers). The Lanmis served the king during royal processions and also took part in battles. They carried traditional arms such as swords, spears, and shields and also had ceremonial roles during peace times.

== Conquests ==
Punshiba's first act as king was to invade the Moirang territory. He also clashed with many tribal villages in the nearby hills, including the Thanga Kambongs, and was successful in those encounters. As a result, the Thanga Kambongs, or Chengleis, lost their independence. After defeating the group in the valley, Punshiba moved to the eastern hills. He defeated the Tangkhuls of Monthou and Kaihau villages. He also invaded the Maring hills and the Kwoirengs of Koubru but was not able to conquer the Kwoirengs.

Under Punshiba's reign, he not only conquered several tribal villages but also expanded the kingdom into the interior tribal areas of the surrounding hills. The military campaigns he launched in these hilly, tribal regions aimed to strengthen the Ningthouja rule in the Kingdom of Manipur.

== Successor ==
Punshiba was succeeded by his son, Ningthoukhomba, who was known as "a worthy son of a worthy father".
