= Leima Linthoingambi =

- Queen of Manipur
- Born: Manipur Kingdom
- Spouse: Ningthoukhomba
- House: Ningthouja dynasty
- Religion: Meitei religion (Sanamahism)
- Occupation: Queen of Manipur

Leima Linthoingambi was the queen of Meitei king Ningthoukhomba, who reigned Manipur Kingdom from 1432 CE to 1467 CE.

During an invasion by the Ankla forces, King Ningthoukhomba led his army to the battlefield. In his absence, the Tangkhul tribes started a raid on Kangla. Disguising herself as the king, Queen Linthoingambi smartly resisted the attack by giving strong wine to the raiders, which resulted in her distracting and pacifying them.

This event is recorded in the royal chronicle called the Ningthourol Lambuba.
