= Aingma =

- Location in Burma
- Coordinates: 22°24′0″N 95°15′0″E
- Country: Burma
- Division: Sagaing Region
- Township: Budalin Township

Population (2005)
  - Religions: Buddhism
- Time zone: UTC+6.30 (MST)

Aingma is a village in the Sagaing Region of north-west Myanmar. It lies in the Tamu District.

== See also ==
- List of cities, towns and villages in Burma: A
