= Khayoiron Tangja Samphabi =

Khayoiron Tangja Samphabi (ꯈꯌꯣꯏꯔꯣꯟ ꯇꯥꯡꯖꯥ ꯁꯝꯐꯕꯤ) was a queen consort of the Ningthouja dynasty and a princess of the Khuman dynasty in the early 13th-century Kangleipak (early Manipur). She was the daughter of Khuman King Punshi Purenhanba (shortly known as Punshiba), and the wife of Ningthouja King Thawanthaba. Her tragic story, as depicted in the classical Meitei historical literary work Thawanthaba Hiran, is one of the earliest examples of realism in Meitei literature. She became a symbol of innocence, sacrifice, and injustice, and her wrongful execution by her husband, King Thawanthaba of the Ningthouja dynasty, marked a turning point in the conflict between the Meitei and Khuman kingdoms.

== Background ==
Khayoiron Tangja Samphabi was the daughter of Khuman King Punshiba, ruler of one of the major clan dynasties in ancient Kangleipak. The Khumans and the Ningthouja Meiteis, though often at odds, shared periods of peace and alliance. During such a time, Samphabi was married to Thawanthaba, the Meitei king, in a political and diplomatic exchange of royal marriages. The alliance was sealed with generous exchanges of gifts and mutual promises of goodwill.

== Life at the Meitei court ==
After her marriage, Khayoiron Tangja Samphabi became one of the young queens of King Thawanthaba. She was reportedly devoted to her husband and lived a quiet life, often engaging in embroidery and weaving, activities highly regarded among noblewomen of the time.

Despite the large harem at the Ningthouja Meitei court, Samphabi maintained a reputation for purity and dignity. However, tensions within the palace and among rival queens created a fragile environment.

== Conspiracy ==
The tragic event that led to Khayoiron Tangja Samphabi's death began when a bunch of flowers, lost by the king's brother, was found near her bed. The flowers were deliberately planted there by a maidservant of another queen consort, with malicious intent. When King Thawanthaba discovered the flowers, he accused Samphabi of infidelity, ignoring her protests and expressions of innocence.

She pleaded her case passionately, swearing her fidelity and asking for a one-day reprieve to wear a new cloth she had woven herself. She even took an oath by biting a thread, a traditional act meant to prove honesty. Despite her emotional appeals and the lack of evidence, she was executed on the king's orders.

== Aftermath ==
Khayoiron Tangja Samphabi's death shocked the Khuman royal family. When her body was returned for the final funeral rites, her father discovered the iron weapon used in her execution embedded in her skull. The act led to a breakdown of peace between the Khumans and Ningthouja Meiteis and ignited a chain of violent reprisals between the two clans.

King Punshiba, enraged by his daughter's death, eventually retaliated by killing his own wife, the Ningthouja princess, daughter of Thawanthaba, in a similar manner. These acts escalated into open warfare marked by brutal ambushes and massacres.

== Legacy ==
Khayoiron Tangja Samphabi is remembered as a tragic figure in Manipuri literary history. Her character, though fictionalized in Thawanthaba Hiran, reflects historical practices, gender norms, and the fragile nature of royal alliances in early Manipur.

She is often compared to classical European tragic figures like Shakespeare’s Desdemona or Browning’s Last Duchess, wrongfully accused and silenced in the name of honor. However, unlike them, Khayoiron Tangja Samphabi is given a voice and agency in the narrative, making her one of the earliest and most detailed portrayals of a Manipuri queen in literature.

== See also ==
- Chingkhei Thanbi
- List of Khuman queens
- List of Khuman kings
- List of Meitei princesses
- Khuman Kangleirol
- Moirang Kangleirol
- Ningthourol Lambuba
- Cheitharol Kumbaba

== Bibliography ==
- Khelchandra Singh, Ningthoukhongjam (1980). Khuman Kangleirol (in Manipuri). India: Digital Library of India; Internet Archive.
- Kullachandra Sharma, B (1998). Khuman Ningthouron Lambuba (in Manipuri). India: Digital Library of India; Internet Archive.
- Ibobi, Laikhuram (1998). Khuman Kangleiron Amasung Laikhuram Shageigee Meihouron (in Manipuri). India: Digital Library of India; Internet Archive.
- Kullachandra, B. (1989-03-15). Khumal Ningthourol Lambuba (in Manipuri). India: Digital Library of India; Internet Archive.
