= Saroj Nalini Arambam Parratt =

Manipuri scholar

Dr Saroj Nalini Arambam Parratt
- ꯁꯔꯣꯖ ꯑꯔꯥꯝꯕꯝ
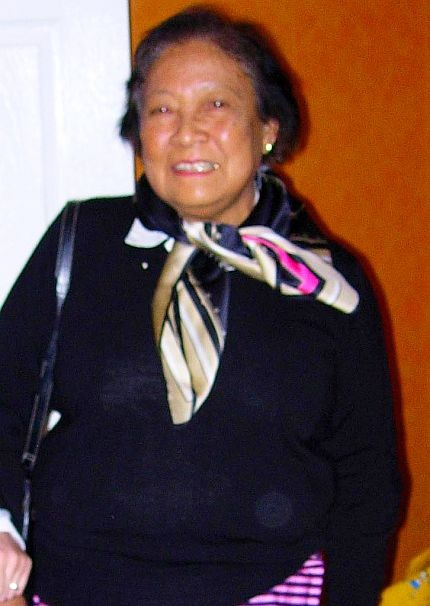
- Saroj N. Parratt
- Born: Saroj Arambam; 2 June 1933; Meino Leirak, Imphal, Manipur
- Died: 6 January 2009 (aged 75)
- Education: University of Calcutta, London University, Australian National University
- Occupations: Theologian, Scholar, Translator
- Spouse: John Parratt
- Relatives: Ibohal Arambam (father)
- Writing career
- Language: English
- Period: 1980-2009
- Subjects: Religion, royalty, culture, etc. of Manipur
- Notable works: The Court Chronicle of the Kings of Manipur, The Pleasing of Gods: Meitei Lai Haraoba, Queen Empress vs. Tikendrajit, the Anglo-Manipuri Conflict of 1891

Saroj Nalini Arambam Parratt (2 June 1933-6 January 2009) was a founding Manipuri scholar, theologian, and translator. She became the first Manipuri woman to earn a Bachelor of Divinity (BD) from the University of London in 1961. She is best known for her definitive three-volume English translation of the royal chronicle of Manipur, The Court Chronicle of the Kings of Manipur: the Cheitharon Kumpapa, published by Routledge in 2005, 2009, and 2012 respectively.

== Early life and education ==
Saroj N. Arambam Parratt was born on 2 June 1933 at the Meino Leirak of Imphal, princely state of Manipur. She attended the University of Calcutta where she became the first Meitei woman to earn both the BA and MA degree in philosophy.

== Conversion to Christianity ==
While studying in Calcutta (Kolkata), she formed close friends with Christian Naga students and embraced Christianity. She was baptised at the Lower Circular Road Baptist church, whose minister, Walter Corlett had himself served in Imphal during the war years.

Despite never working as a missionary, she maintained spiritual ties with Meitei Christian communities. A witness to Imphal churches in 1989, she reportedly wept upon seeing new converts—signalling her emotional connection to the community.

== Academic career ==
In the late 1950s, Saroj Nalini traveled to the UK to pursue a theological education. She later married John Parratt shortly after graduating from the University of London in 1961 with a Bachelor of Divinity. They chose to work in developing nations after becoming disillusioned with their desire to work in Manipur. Following that, Saroj Nalini went to Nigeria to teach philosophy at the University of Ile-Ife. Later, at the Australian National University, Nalini worked with renowned Indologist Arthur Llewellyn Basham to pursue a PhD, completing a thesis titled, The Religion of Manipur (published in 1980). In 1972, she went back to Manipur to conduct fieldwork, and in the three years that followed, she finished her doctorate. Three years later, the doctorate was granted. One of Saroj's work examiners, Professor Suniti Kumar Chatterji, had a keen interest in Northeast India and assisted Saroj in getting her thesis published as a book by Firma KLM, Kolkata, in 1980.

Saroj Nalini was a professor in several African nations, such as Malawi and Botswana. Her writings focused on Christian women in Botswana and Islam in Malawi. But her primary focus was still the Meetei, and she worked in the field for extended periods of time in Manipur. She made a good relationship with the University of Manipur, and was appointed an honorary professor there in 2001. She and John written a number of academic studies and research papers, including two books that they co-authored.

Saroj Nalini’s two main books included ‘Queen Empress vs. Tikendrajit, the Anglo-Manipuri Conflict 1891’ and ‘The Pleasing of Gods: Meitei Lai Haraoba’ published by Vikas, New Delhi.

== Literary and scholarly contributions ==
Saroj Nalini wanted to translate the Cheitharol Kumbaba, the Court Chronicle of the Kings of Manipur, before departing Botswana in 2000. She had the chance to meet Meitei religious scholars when she visited Manipur. The Cheitharol Kumbaba, which was first composed in the Ancient Meitei language, was available for her to pick up in photocopy. She quickly became proficient in the Ancient Meitei script.

After receiving an honorary fellowship from the Institute for Textual Scholarship and Electronic Editing at the University of Birmingham, she began the translation that would occupy the remainder of her life. The Royal Asiatic Society sponsored the publication of The Court Chronicle of the Kings of Manipur: the Cheitharol Kumpapa, the first translation volume, which was published by Routledge in 2005. By then, Saroj had a terminal illness, and she completed the first draft of the second volume a week before she died. Saroj's work served as a guide for her husband, John Parratt, as he completed volumes two and three. The translated version of Cheitharol Kumbaba has greatly expanded the options available to future researchers.

She died on 6 January 2009.

== Legacy ==
Manipur's Christians have not acknowledged Saroj Nalini's contributions. Saroj Nalini, the first Christian theologian and woman of India to earn a BA and MA, will be a source of pride for Manipur's Christians as she translated the state's significant historical narrative.

Saroj Nalini Arambam Parratt's work with her husband for the Mongoloids has made her well-known in North-East India, but she is not yet well-known among Christians. There is no historical record of her participation in the Christian mission, in contrast to the state's Christian theologians.

== Books ==
- Parratt, Saroj Nalini Arambam (2005). The Court Chronicle of the Kings of Manipur: 33-1763 CE. Routledge. ISBN 9780415344302.
- Parratt, Saroj Nalini Arambam (2009). The Court Chronicle of the Kings of Manipur: Volume 2, the Cheitharon Kumpapa. Cambridge University Press. ISBN 9788175968547.
- Parratt, Saroj Nalini (2012). The Court Chronicle of the Kings of Manipur: The Cheitharon Kumpapa Vol. 3, 1843-1892 Ce, Volume 3. Vol. 3. Cambridge University Press India Pvt. Limited. ISBN 9789382264996.
- Parratt, Saroj Nalini Arambam (1997). The Pleasing of the Gods: Meitei Lai Haraoba. Vikas Publishing House. ISBN 978-81-259-0416-8.
- Parratt, Saroj Nalini Arambam (1980). The Religion of Manipur: Beliefs, Rituals, and Historical Development. Firma KLM. ISBN 978-0-8364-0594-1.
- Parratt, Saroj Nalini Arambam; Parratt, John (2011). The History and Culture of Manipur. Hayloft Pub. ISBN 978-1-904524-85-4.
- Parratt, Saroj Nalini Arambam (2002). Female Spirit-possession Rituals Among the Meiteis of Manipur. Religious Experience Research Centre, University of Wales. ISBN 978-0-906165-43-0.
