= Senbi Kiyamba =

Senbi Kiyamba (Old Manipuri: Senpi Kiyampa)
- Ningthou, Meidingu of Kangleipak (Manipur)
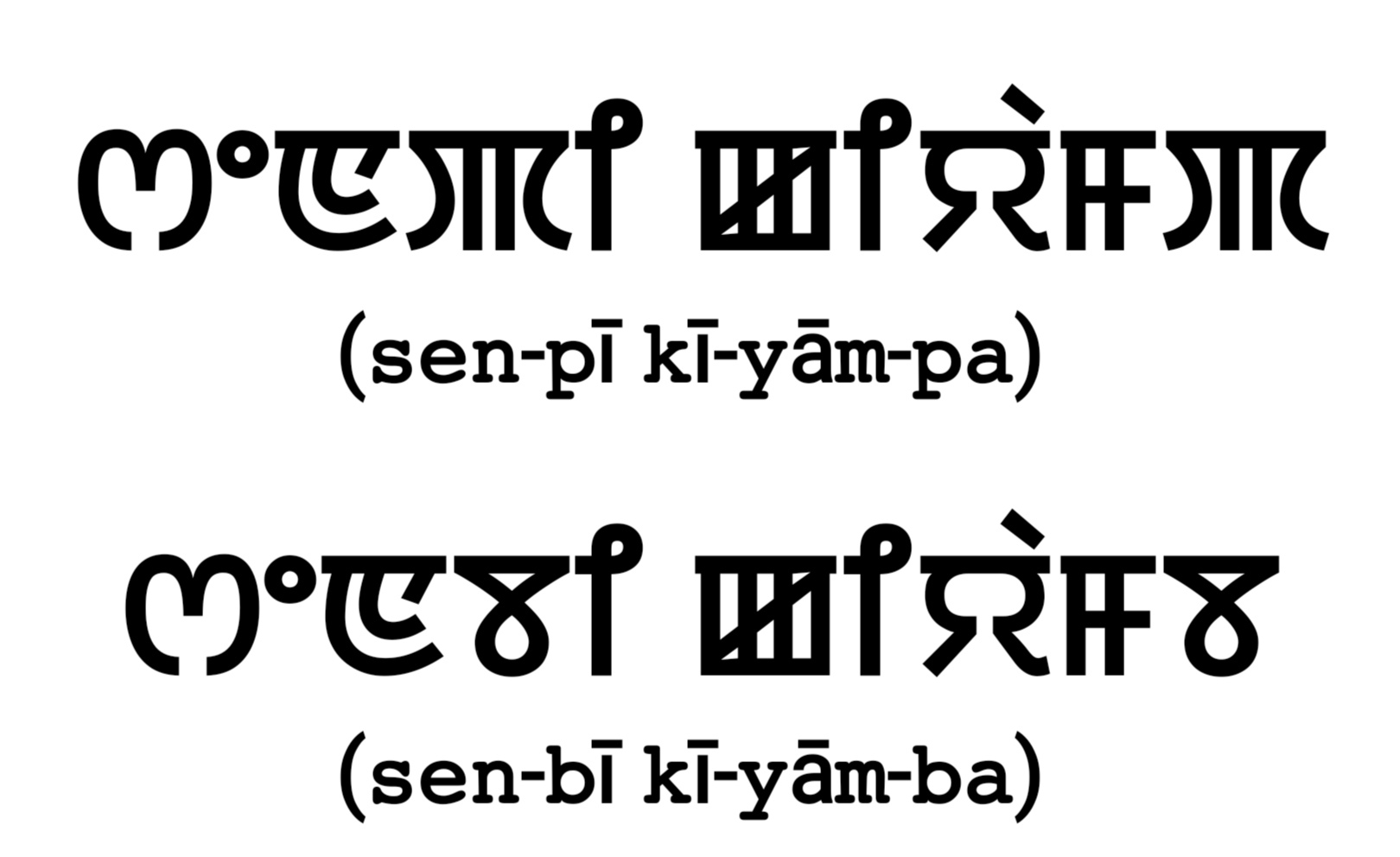
- "Senpi Kiyampa" (Ancient Meitei name) and "Senbi Kiyamba" (Modern Meitei name) of the Meitei king, the ruler of Kangleipak kingdom (Manipur kingdom)
- Coronation: 1467
- Predecessor: Ningthou Khomba
- Successor: Koirengba
- Born: Thangwai Ningthouba; 1443
- Died: 1508 (aged 64–65)
- Meidingu Lairel Senbi Kiyamba
- House: Ningthouja dynasty
- Father: Ningthou Khomba
- Mother: Leima Linthoingambi
- Religion: Meitei religion (Sanamahism)

Senbi Kiyamba (Old Manipuri: Senpi Kiyampa) (1467–1508) was a Meitei monarch and a ruler of Kangleipak kingdom (Manipur kingdom). He was the son of Medingu Ningthou Khomba and his warrior queen Leima Linthoingambi. Born Thangwai Ningthouba, he succeeded his father at the age of 24. He took the name Kiyamba meaning "Conqueror of Kyang", after conquering the Shan kingdom in the Kabaw Valley in alliance with King Choupha Khe Khomba of Pong in 1470.

== Pheiya ==
In celebration of their victory over Kyang, the King of Pong presented Kiyamba with a golden box containing a stone known as Pheiya (Almighty). Kiyamba built a brick temple in the capital Lamangdong, 27 kilometres (17 miles) south of Imphal, in 1475 for the sacred stone. During this period, Bramins migrated to Manipur. Legend states that a Brahmin identified Pheiya as Vishnu and said that good fortune would come to the king and kingdom if rice boiled in cow's milk was offered to the deity. Lamangdong was subsequently named Bishnupur (Abode of Vishnu) in honour of the temple.

== Edicts and inscriptions ==
The royal chronicle Cheitharol Kumbaba dates from this time and is one of the primary texts in the Meitei script. Kiyamba's royal edicts have been found in the script in a stone inscription at Khoibu in Tengnoupal district.

== Cheithaba ==
In 1485, Kiyamba introduced a system for counting years called Cheithaba, by which each year is named for a person who would take responsibility for the suffering of the kingdom during that year.

Preceded by Ningthou Khomba	Meidingu of Manipur; 1467-1508	Succeeded by Koirengba
