= Thawānthābā =

Meitei ruler (died 1231)

Thawanthaba
- Meitei Ningthou

King of Ningthouja dynasty
- Monarchy: 1195–1231 CE
- Coronation: 1195 CE
- Predecessor: Hemtou Iwanthaba
- Successor: Chingthang Lanthaba
- Died: 1231
- Issue: Chingthang Lanthaba
Era name and dates
- Medieval Manipur: 1195–1231 CE
Regnal name
- Meidingu Thawanthaba
- House: Ningthouja dynasty
- Father: Hemtou Iwanthaba
- Mother: Khuroi Ngambi
- Religion: Sanamahism
- Occupation: Ruler of the Kangleipak Kingdom

Meidingu Thawanthaba or Thawan Thaba (Meitei: ꯊꯋꯥꯟꯊꯥꯕꯥ, romanized: Tha-waan-thaa-baa) was a Meitei ruler of the Ningthouja dynasty of Medieval Kangleipak who ruled from 1195 to 1231 CE.

He is the central figure in the historical Meitei language literary work, Thawanthaba Hiran (ꯊꯋꯥꯟꯊꯥꯕꯥ ꯍꯤꯔꯥꯟ), a tragedy based on a crime story. He ascended the throne during a relatively peaceful period in Manipur's history and also during a time of rivalry and occasional alliance between the Meiteis (Ningthoujas) and Khumans.

== Matrimonial alliances ==
To strengthen the relations with the Khumans, Thawanthaba decided to marry Khayoiron Tangja Samphabi (Note: Also known as "Saphabi" (ꯁꯥꯐꯥꯕꯤ).), the daughter of the Khuman King Punshi Purenhanba (Note: Shortly known as "Punshiba" (ꯄꯨꯟꯁꯤꯕꯥ).) (c. 1230 CE - 1270 CE). In exchange, Thawanthaba gave his own daughter, Wangamlon Chingkheithanbi (Note: also known as Chingkhei Thanbi) in marriage to the Khuman king. Both marriages were commemorated with lavish ceremonies, lavish gift-giving, and symbolic acts of peace.

Initially, the new brides became the young favourite queens of each king. However, internal palace rivalries and jealousies—especially within his large harem—would soon lead to a tragedy.

According to scholar Wahengbam Ibohal, Thawanthaba was the father-in-law of King Punshi Purenhanba.

== War against Heirems ==
King Thawanthaba was requested by the Khuman King Punshiba to assist him in a battle against the Heirems. Thawanthaba agreed to help him and went to attack the Heirems with his soldiers.

The Heirems (Heirems and Khunjans in other books) were fully destroyed by the combined forces of the Meiteis and the Khumans.

== Unfortunate misjudgement ==
During a royal festival in the kingdom, Thawanthaba set up an archery competition. He then invited his younger brother Leishapamba Tougaingamba, who was a great lover of flowers, to attend. However, he refused to attend as he did not have any purpose of having fun after he lost his bunch of flowers.

At that time, Akong Langmeisu, a malicious maidservant, planted those same flowers in the bed of Queen Samphabi.

That night, the Meitei King found the flowers and, suspecting adultery, became enraged. Despite the Queen's tearful pleas of innocence, her emotional appeals, and the royal ritual oaths, the King sentenced her to death by using a pointed iron weapon. This action was done in cold blood.

== War with Khumans ==
A terrible chain of events began with the assassination of Queen Samphabi. When her father, the Khuman King Punshiba, saw the iron weapon in her skull at her funeral, he promised a revenge for her.

The Khuman King invited Thawanthaba to follow him for a military campaign, but he was secretly planning to kill him in revenge of his daughter. However, Thawanthaba managed to get away after being alerted by his own daughter, but Khuman soldiers caught him in the act. After the Meiteis prevailed in that battle, they killed a Khuman noble in retaliation.

In revenge, the Khuman king killed the daughter of Thawanthaba—his own wife—even though she was pregnant and innocent. As a result, the two kingdoms went on a full-scale war.

== Military campaigns and final conflict ==
Thawanthaba conducted a series of military campaigns against the Khumans. He used disguised spies, decoys, and scouts, and entered the Khuman territory.

One Meitei warrior took the form of a lone hunter and ambushed the Khumans in a decisive attack. Even though the Khumans fought back, they were devastatingly defeated and many of their soldiers were murdered. At the end of the war, both sides suffered significant losses.
