= Kabaw Valley =

Historical border region between Manipur and Burma

Kabaw Valley ကဘော်ချိုင့်ဝှမ်း
- Natural region
- Location within Myanmar Location within Manipur
- Coordinates: 24.10527°N 94.34194°E
- Country: Myanmar; India
- Region/State: Sagaing; Manipur (easternmost parts)

Area
  - Total: 22,210 km^{2} (8,580 sq mi)
- Elevation: 140 m (460 ft)

The Kabaw Valley also known as Kubo valley is a highland valley in Myanmar's western Sagaing Division and the adjacent regions of Manipur's easternmost frontiers, along the India–Myanmar border. The valley is located between Yomadong range of mountains, which constitute the present-day India–Myanmar border, and the Chindwin River (also called the Ningthi River).

According to the Manipur chronicles, Meidingu (King) Kiyamba of Manipur and the king of the Pong kingdom jointly conquered the Kabaw Valley in the 15th century, and the valley was divided between the two kings. It was under Manipuri control for a considerable period, though it was frequently occupied by the Burmese kings from Bayinnaung onwards. Finally it was ceded to Burma by the king Marjit Singh, in return for Burmese help in his accession to the throne.

During the First Anglo-Burmese War, the Manipuri prince Gambhir Singh evicted the Burmese from the Kabaw valley, but the Burmese contested the Manipuri claim to it. After receiving input from the British envoy to Burma, Major Henry Burney, the British were persuaded to hand the valley back to Burma in 1834. The British compensated Manipur for the loss of territory by an annual subsidy.

== Geography ==
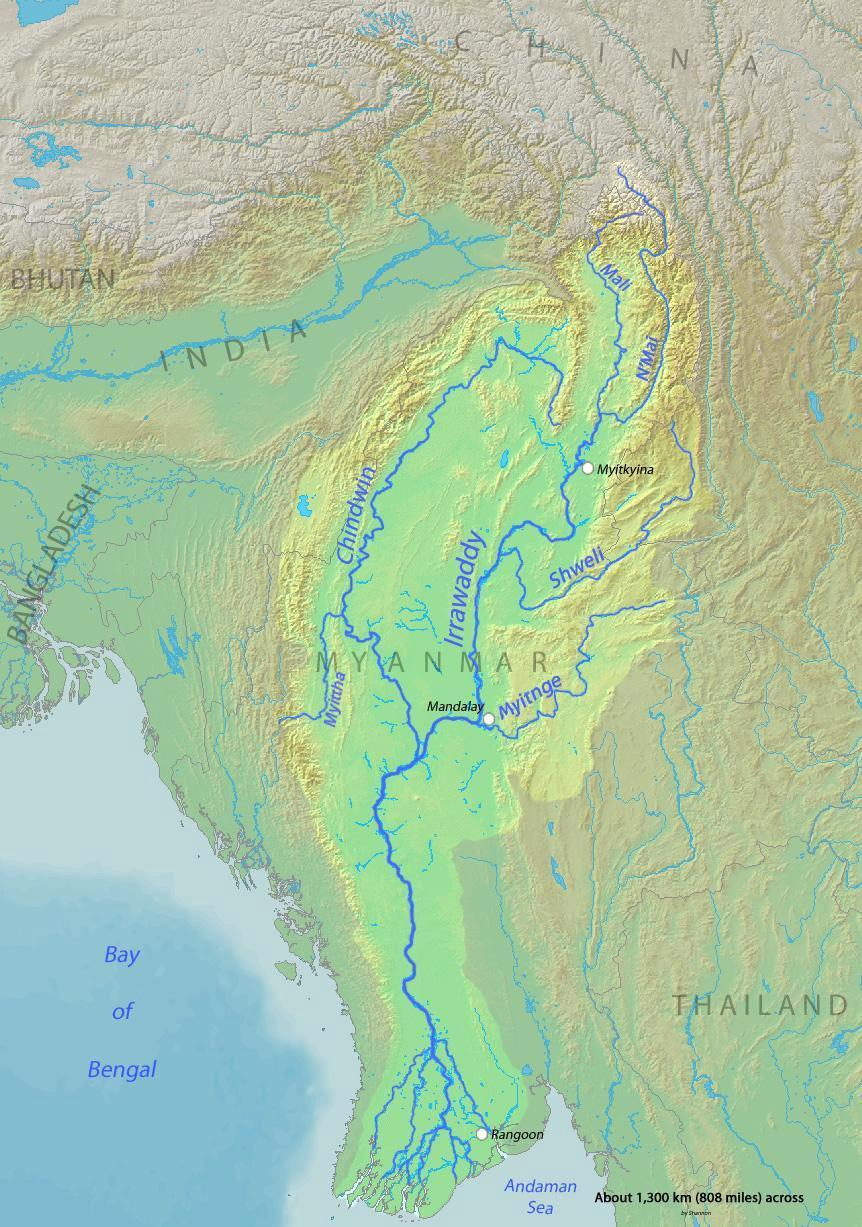
Major river valleys of Myanmar

The Kale–Kabaw Valley is to the west of the Chindwin River valley, separated by a range called Ango Ching (or Ang-go Ching). It is bounded on the west by the Yomadong range of mountains, the bounding range of Manipur and Chin Hills. The northern section, called the Kabaw valley, is watered by the Yu River (or the Kabaw River), which flows south until Khampat and then breaks through the Ango Ching range to join Chindwin. The southern section, called the Kale valley, is watered by the Myittha River flowing north, which breaks through Ango Ching near Kale.

The 1913 Burma Gazetteer describes the valley as being "unhealthy but exceedingly fertile", which is "imperfectly cultivated". It also mentions that the paddy grown in the valley could not be easily taken to the market (in the Chindwin valley or beyond) due to the difficulty of transport through the Ango Ching range.

The valley used to have three principalities based at Thaungdut (Note: Thaungdut (or "Thaungdoot", "Thaungthut") is actually in the Chindwin River valley (24.4327°N 94.7024°E). It appears to have controlled the northern portion of the Kabaw Valley from here.) (known as "Samjok" in Manipur), (Note: Alternative spellings: "Samsok", "Somsok", "Songsuk", and "Sumjok".) Khampat, (Note: Alternative spellings: Khanpat, Kampat and Kumbat.) and Kale. (Note: Alternative spellings: Kule.) Thaungdut/Samjok and Khampat were jointly invaded by the king Kiyamba of Manipur and the king of Pong in 1467 CE, and divided among themselves. Kale appears to have remained independent, at least for a time.

Thus the name "Kabaw Valley" applies to the valley north of Khampat, while the southern valley retains the name "Kale". The two are jointly referred to as "Kale-Kabaw Valley".

After a 1758 invasion by emperor Alaungpaya of Burma, a market and town appear to have developed at Tamu, overshadowing Khampat. By the end of the 19th century, when the British took over Burma, the "Tamu Township" was considered synonymous with the Kabaw Valley.

To the northwest of Tamu, is the village of Moreh on the Manipur side of the border. A Manipuri stockade was established here by Gambhir Singh in 1829, and later a penal colony for women convicts. In the 20th century, it has developed into a border trading town twinned with Tamu.

== History ==
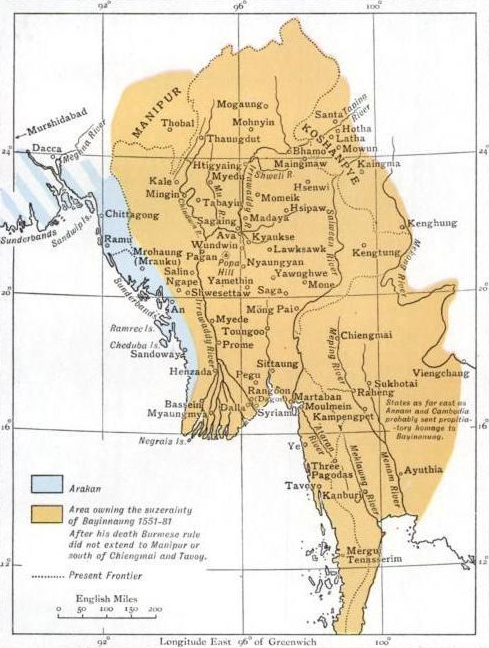
Burmese Toungoo kingdom in 1572

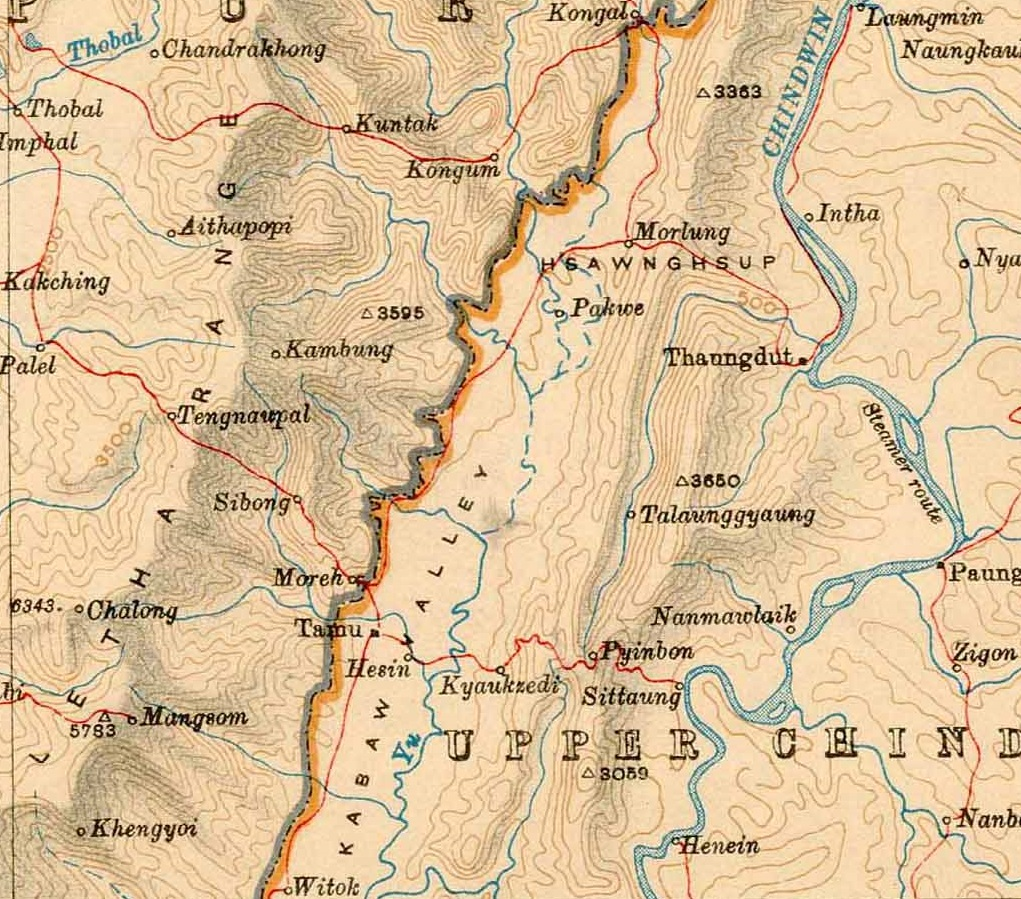
The location of Tamu in the Kabaw Valley as well as the Tamu Road from Manipur, also known as the Aimol Pass (Survey of India, 1924)

The Chronicles of Manipur, called Cheitharol Kumbaba state that, in 1470 CE, King Kiyamba of Manipur and King Choupha Khekkhompa of Pong (identified with the state of Mogaung) conquered together the principalities of Thaungdut and Khampat:

[King Kiyamba] was victorious over the Kyangs of Kapo. Meetingu Kyampa and Choupha Khekkhompa, the king of Pong, made an alliance and fought (against the Kyangs). ... They attacked together Kyang Khampat of Kapo. They defeated Kyang. Captured in battle Mung of Takhen, Khamset, Khamkhai and Hokham.

"Kyangs" refers to "Chins", the Burmese name for the tribes inhabiting the Northern Arakan Yomas, who are called "Kukis" on the Indian side of the border.

After their victory, the two kings divided the conquered land among themselves, with Khampat and some part of Thaungdut (possibly the northern part of the Kabaw Valley) going to Manipur, and Thaungdut in the Chindwin River valley going to Pong. Thaungdut, a Shan principality, appears to have remained for a considerable period, possibly as a subsidiary of Pong. Nothing more is heard of Khampat after this conquest. The headquarters of the principality appears to have shifted to Tamu, close to the route to Manipur called the "Aimol Pass".

Around 1555, the King Bayinnaung of the Toungoo dynasty unified all of present day Burma (Myanmar), conquering or receiving tribute from all the Shan kingdoms in the north. His prestige was so great that the Manipur kingdom is said to have become a tributary. Some time after Bayinnaung, Manipur declared independence, but the relations with Burma continued as late as 1704, when Manipur offered a princess in marriage to the Toungoo emperor. Border raids in both the directions occurred during the intervening period. In 1647 and 1692, Manipur is said to have raided Thaungdut and the empire sent levies to defend it. The Manipuris also acquired horsemanship from the Burmese during this period, and refined their skills by playing Polo as a regular pastime. During the reign of Garib Niwaz (r. 1714–1754), when the Toungoo empire became considerably weak, the Manipuris raided all the way to Sagaing, opposite the capital Ava, burnt villages and monasteries and carried off captives.

Retribution to Manipur was delivered after the Toungoo dynasty was replaced by the Konbaung dynasty in Burma, with Alaungpaya coming to the throne in 1752. Alaungpaya personally invaded Manipur in 1758, causing considerable damage. He left after thirteen days, leaving forces permanently garrisoned at Tamu and Thaungdut. A more devastating invasion was made by his successor Hsinbyushin in 1764 capturing numerous captives. The ruler Bhagyachandra fled to Assam, where he remained for four years. (Note: The Chronicle of Manipur does not mention the names of Alaungpaya and Hsinbyushin. It states that the king, Meitingu Marampa, "ascended to the heavens" even before the latter's invasion and that his successor Bhagyachandra, having been defeated, fled to Assam.) Further raids continued till 1782 and Bhagyachandra's efforts to regain his throne were repeatedly repulsed. After 1782, Manipur appears to have been left alone in Bhagyachandra's hands, but raids on the Kabaw Valley are mentioned in the chronicles. In 1804, chiefs of fourteen outlying villages, including Tamu and Thaungdut, are said to have paid tribute to Bhagyachandra after a gap of 41 years.

After Bhagyachandra's death, his sons quarreled for the throne, inviting Burmese interference. Marjit Singh, who wanted to usurp the throne from his brother Chourjit Singh, went to the Burmese King Bodawpaya, taking gifts and seeking his help. In 1813, Bodawpaya moved forward bases into the Kabaw Valley, ousted Chourjit Singh from Manipur and installed Marjit Singh as the king of Manipur. In return Marjit Singh ceded Kabaw Valley to Burma.

Marjit Singh's insubordination to Bodawpaya's successor Bagyidaw in 1819 led to a final Burmese conquest of Manipur, and changed the Burmese policy from a demand for tribute to indirect administration through a puppet ruler. A permanent garrison was stationed in Manipur to back the installed administration. The Burmese occupation lasted seven years and ended only with the First Anglo-Burmese War.

=== War and settlement ===
During the Burmese occupation, the four sons of Bhagyachandra ensconced themselves in the neighbouring kingdom of Cachar, whose ruler Gonvinda Chandra was their relative. From there, they sought British help to oust the Burmese from Manipur. After the Burmese occupied Assam and started threatening the states bordering British Bengal, the British declared war on Burma in 1824. Gambhir Singh, one of the four sons, was provided funding to raise a 'Manipur Levy' from Manipuri expatriates, with the objective of driving the Burmese out of Manipur. It eventually consisted of 2000 men and was commanded by a British officer, Major F. J. Grant with Captain R. B. Pemberton as his assistant. (Note: The initial offer was made to Chorjit Singh and Gambhir Singh jointly, but the former was dismissed in due course as the British were not convinced of his loyalty.)

The British proceeded on two fronts: a land invasion of Assam, which commenced immediately, and a naval invasion on the Burmese mainland starting in May 1824. Gambhir Singh's force entered Manipur in June 1825 and found that the Burmese forces had already left the state. They had been apparently recalled to fight against British advances along the valley of the Irrawaddy River.

In January 1826, Gambhir Singh marched to Kabaw Valley, where again only local men were present under the command of the chief of Thaungdut (Samjok). They were ensconced in two stockades, one at Tamu and another on the right bank of the Chindwin River. Both were easily defeated.

By February 1826, the Burmese agreed to all the British terms and signed the Treaty of Yandabo. By the treaty, they relinquished control over all the states bordering British India, including Manipur. It was later recognized that the clause concerning Manipur was rather limited. It stipulated that "should Gumbheer Sing desire to return to that country, he shall be recognised by the King of Ava as Raja thereof". He was not explicitly recognised as an independent ruler. Nor was any territory or boundary mentioned. However, it became immediately clear that the Kabaw Valley was contested. After the conclusion of the treaty, some Burmese troops entered the Kabaw Valley but returned without entering into hostilities. Gambhir Singh submitted the matter to the decision of the British Government.

Henry Burney, who was sent as the British envoy to Ava, (Note: Major Burney was officially designated as the "British Resident" at Ava, but the term did not imply any vassalage of Burma to British India. The Burmese king was addressed as "His Majesty".) was charged with discussing the matter with the Burmese. He ascertained that the Burmese had no wish to claim suzerainty over Manipur. However, they did not accept Manipur's claim to the Kabaw Valley, and wanted it returned. Burney found that tensions were rather high over the issue. King Bogyidaw was firm in his demand for the Kabaw Valley and was quite prepared to renew hostilities for its sake. Several years of negotiations followed. Burney found the Burmese empire compiling the historical chronicles of all the Burmese kingdoms, which were made available to him to study. Based on his own studies, in addition to the Burmese arguments, Burney became convinced of the Burmese claim to the Kabaw Valley. In the eventual memorandum sent to the British Governor-General, he stated that the Kabaw Valley was in the possession of Burmese kings since 1370, and that, for 12 years prior to the outbreak of the war, it was in continuous Burmese possession. Further, he interpreted the Treaty of Yandabo to mean that Manipur was entitled to recover only those territories that it possessed before the war.

However, Burney's report helped the Burmese claim and the Governor-General acceded to the demand to restore Kabaw Valley to Burma. The transfer took place on 9 January 1834. Grant and Pemberton were dispatched to define the boundary between Manipur and Burma along the Yomadong range, where it still lies. Manipur was compensated by the British government for the loss of its territory by an annual payment of Rs. 6,000, which state clearly as per the treaty of 1834, "It is to be distinctly understood that should any circumstance here after arise by which the portion of territory lately made over to Ava again reverts to Munnipore, the allowance now granted by the British Government will cease from the date of such reversion." Consequently, Manipuri considered it as lease to Burma, and as per James Johnstone, Kabaw Valley was in British possession in December 1885.

== Communities ==
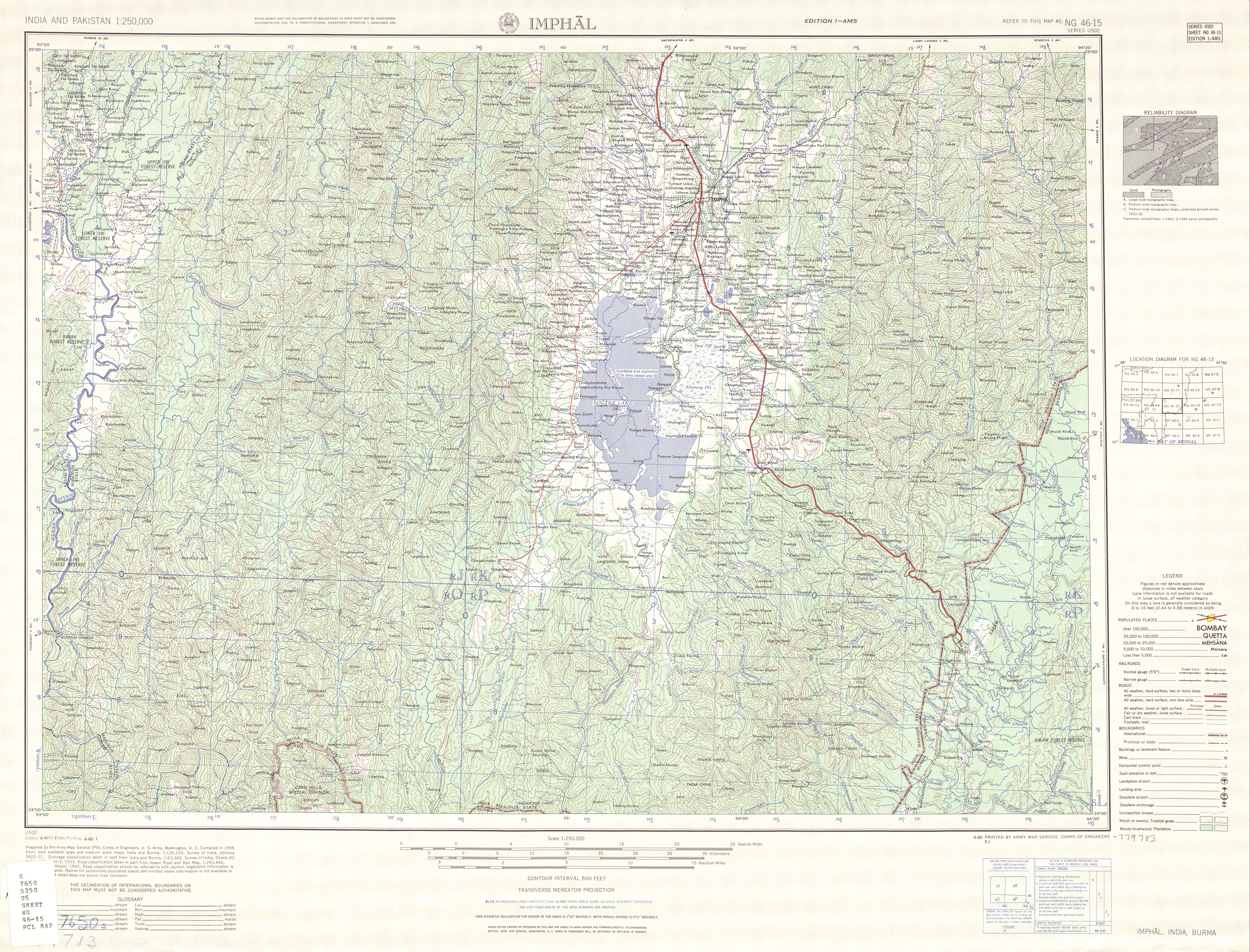
Survey map showing Imphal valley along with Kabaw valley (AMS, 1955, based on Survey of India maps prior to 1942)

At the northernmost end of the valley, lies the Manipuri villages of Huimine and Phaikoh in Kamjong district, with the first Burmese town being Zedi.

Moreh is the border town in Manipur, India while Tamu is in Myanmar. Both are being referred to as the twin border towns of trade in the border region.

In the Chandel district, numerous settlements are present along the border in the valley such as the villages of TS Laijang, Changpol, T. Nampao, Molcham, New Samtal, L. Jangnompha etc.

== See also ==
- Hsawnghsup
- Manipur (princely state)
- History of Manipur

== Bibliography ==
- Dun, E. W. (1992) [1886], Gazetteer of Manipur, Manas Publications – via archive.org
- Grant Brown, G. E. R. (1913), Burmah Gazetteer: Upper Chindwin District, Volume A, Rangoon: Superintendent, Government Printing – via archive.org
- Aung, Maung Htin (1967). A History of Burma. New York and London: Cambridge University Press. p. 117 – via archive.org.
- Aung-Thwin, Michael; Aung-Thwin, Maitrii (2013), A History of Myanmar since Ancient Times: Traditions and Transformations (revised ed.), Reaktion Books, ISBN 9781861899392
- Banerjee, A. C. (1946) [1943], The Eastern Frontier of British India, 1784–1826 (Second ed.), Calcutta: A. Mukherjee – via archive.org
- Cocks, S. W. (1919), A Short History of Burma, London: McMillan – via archive.org
- Hall, D. G. E. (1974), Henry Burney – A Biography, Oxford University Press – via archive.org
- Harvey, G. E. (1925). History of Burma: From the Earliest Times to 10 March 1824. London: Frank Cass & Co. Ltd – via archive.org.
- Johnstone, James (1896). My Experiences in Manipur and the Naga Hills. London: Sampson Low, Marston and Company.
- Lieberman, Victor B. (2003). Strange Parallels: Southeast Asia in Global Context, c. 800–1830, volume 1, Integration on the Mainland. Cambridge University Press. ISBN 978-0-521-80496-7.
- Ningthouja, Malem (2021), "Disputed Pillars at the Margin of History: Manipur-Myanmar Boundary and India's Strategic Silence", in Chosein Yamahata; Donald M. Seekins; Makiko Takeda (eds.), Social Transformations in India, Myanmar, and Thailand: Volume I: Social, Political and Ecological Perspectives, Singapore: Springer, pp. 377–396, ISBN 978-981-15-9616-2
- Parratt, John (2005), Wounded Land: Politics and Identity in Modern Manipur, Mittal Publications, ISBN 9788183240536
- Parratt, Saroj Nalini Arambam (2005). The Court Chronicle of the Kings of Manipur: The Cheitharon Kumpapa, Volume 1. London: Routledge. ISBN 0-415-34430-1.
- Parratt, Saroj Nalini Arambam (2009). The Court Chronicle of the Kings of Manipur: The Cheitharon Kumpapa, Volume 2. Foundation Books / Cambridge University Press India. ISBN 978-81-7596-854-7.
- Parratt, Saroj Nalini Arambam (2013). The Court Chronicle of the Kings of Manipur: The Cheitharon Kumpapa, Volume 3. Foundation Books / Cambridge University Press India. ISBN 978-93-8226-498-9.
- Pemberton, Capt. R. Boileau (1835), Report on the Eastern Frontier of British India, Calcutta: Government of India – via archive.org
- Siṃha, Kārāma Manimohana (1989), Hijam Irabot Singh and Political Movements in Manipur, B.R. Publishing Corporation, ISBN 978-81-7018-578-9
- Tarapot, Phanjoubam (2003), Bleeding Manipur, Har-Anand Publications, ISBN 978-81-241-0902-1
- Thant, Myint-U (2001), The Making of Modern Burma, Cambridge University Press, ISBN 978-0-521-79914-0
