= Tamu District =

Coordinates: 24°13′N 94°24′E

Tamu District တမူးခရိုင်
- District
- Tamu district in Sagaing region
- Country: Myanmar
- Region: Sagaing Region
- No. of Townships: 1
- Capital: Tamu
- Time zone: UTC+6.30 (MMT)

Tamu District is an administrative district in Sagaing Region, Myanmar. Its administrative center is Tamu Town.

== Townships ==
Tamu District consists of the following townships:

- Tamu Township
- Khampat Subtownship
  - Khampat
- Myothit Subtownship
  - Myothit

== Villages ==
- Aingma
