= Tamu Township =

Tamu Township တမူးမြို့နယ်
- Township
- Location in Sagaing region
- Coordinates: 24°12′49.06″N 94°18′20.16″E
- Country: Myanmar
- Region: Sagaing Region
- District: Tamu District
- Capital: Tamu

Area
  - Total: 511.70 sq mi (1,325.30 km^{2})
- Elevation: 2,400 ft (730 m)

Population (2019)
  - Total: 114,572
  - Density: 223.904/sq mi (86.4499/km^{2})
- Time zone: UTC+6.30 (MMT)

Tamu Township is a township in Tamu District in the Sagaing Division of Burma. The principal town is Tamu. Tamu township is the only township of Tamu District, which borders the country of India.

== History ==
On January 7, 2024, in the midst of the Myanmar civil war, the Myanmar military engaged in airstrikes on the village of Kanan within Khampat, Tamu Township near the village church and a school, killing 17 civilians, including nine children, and wounded 20.

== List of towns ==
Town	Burmese name	Population		±% p.a.	Area		Density	
		(2019)	(2018)		km^{2}	sq mi	/km^{2}	/sq mi
Khampat	ခမ်းပါတ်	15,400	14,910	3.29%	33.33	12.87	462	1,197
Myothit	မြို့သစ်	1,308	1,274	2.67%	3.34	1.29	392	1,014
Tamu	တမူး	97,864	93,085	5.13%	19.81	7.65	4,940	12,795

=== Villages ===
- Ahlaw
- Kanan (ကနန်; in Khampat)
- Kun Tawng Ywar Thit (ကွန်းတောင်းရွာသစ်; also Chin village)
- Kyuntawyaeshin (ကျွန်းတောရေရှင်)
