= Thaungdut =

Thaungdut သောင်သွတ်ရွာ Thaung Thut
- Village
- Location in Myanmar
- Coordinates: 24°26′N 94°42′E
- Country: Myanmar
- Region: Sagaing Region
- District: Homalin District
- Township: Homalin Township

Population (2014)
  - Total: 2,241
- Time zone: UTC+6.30 (MMT)

Thaungdut or Thaung Thut is a village on the Chindwin River in Homalin District in northern Sagaing Region of northwestern Burma. It is located next to Chaunggan.

Originally, "Thaung Thut" was the Burmese name for Hsawnghsup, (Note: Alternative spellings: "Somsok" in Manipur Chronicles and "Samjok" in British transliteration.) a Shan state in the northern Kabaw Valley. Its headquarters was moved to the present village of Thaungdut on the bank of the Chindwin River sometime during the rule of Ava (most likely during the Konbaung period). The name Thaungdut is now applied to only the village.

== History ==
Originally, Thaungdut (Hsawnghsup) was one of the Shan States ruled by Shan saophas.

== Demographics ==
Thaungdut has a population of 2,241 people (1,043 males and 1,198 females) living in 441 households.
