= Möng Kawng =

Former Shan state in Burma

Coordinates: 25°18′N 96°56′E

- State of the Shan States
- c. 13th century–1796
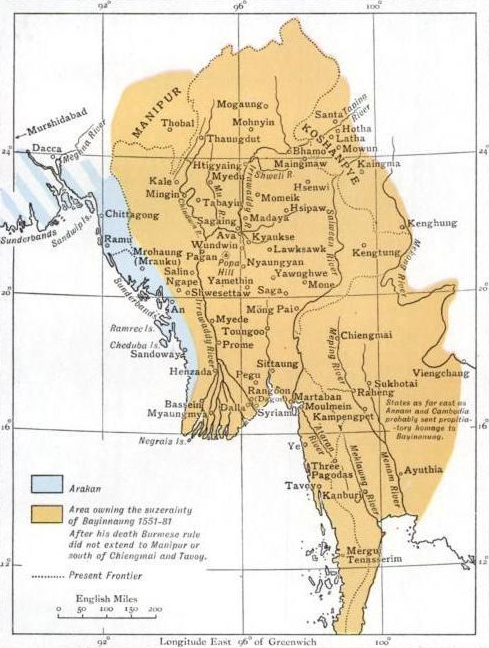
- Mogaung (Möng Kawng) in a map of the Toungoo Kingdom
- Capital: Mogaung
- History
  - Möng Kawng state established: c. 13th century
  - Annexed by the Kingdom of Burma: 1796
Succeeded by
Taungoo Dynasty
- Today part of: Myitkyina District, Myanmar

Möng Kawng (Shan: မိူင်းၵွင်း; Tai Nüa: ᥛᥫᥒᥰ ᥐᥩᥒᥰ; Burmese: မိုးကောင်း; Chinese: 孟拱), also known as Mogaung, was a Shan state in what is today Burma. It was an outlying territory, located away from the main Shan State area in present-day Kachin State.

== History ==
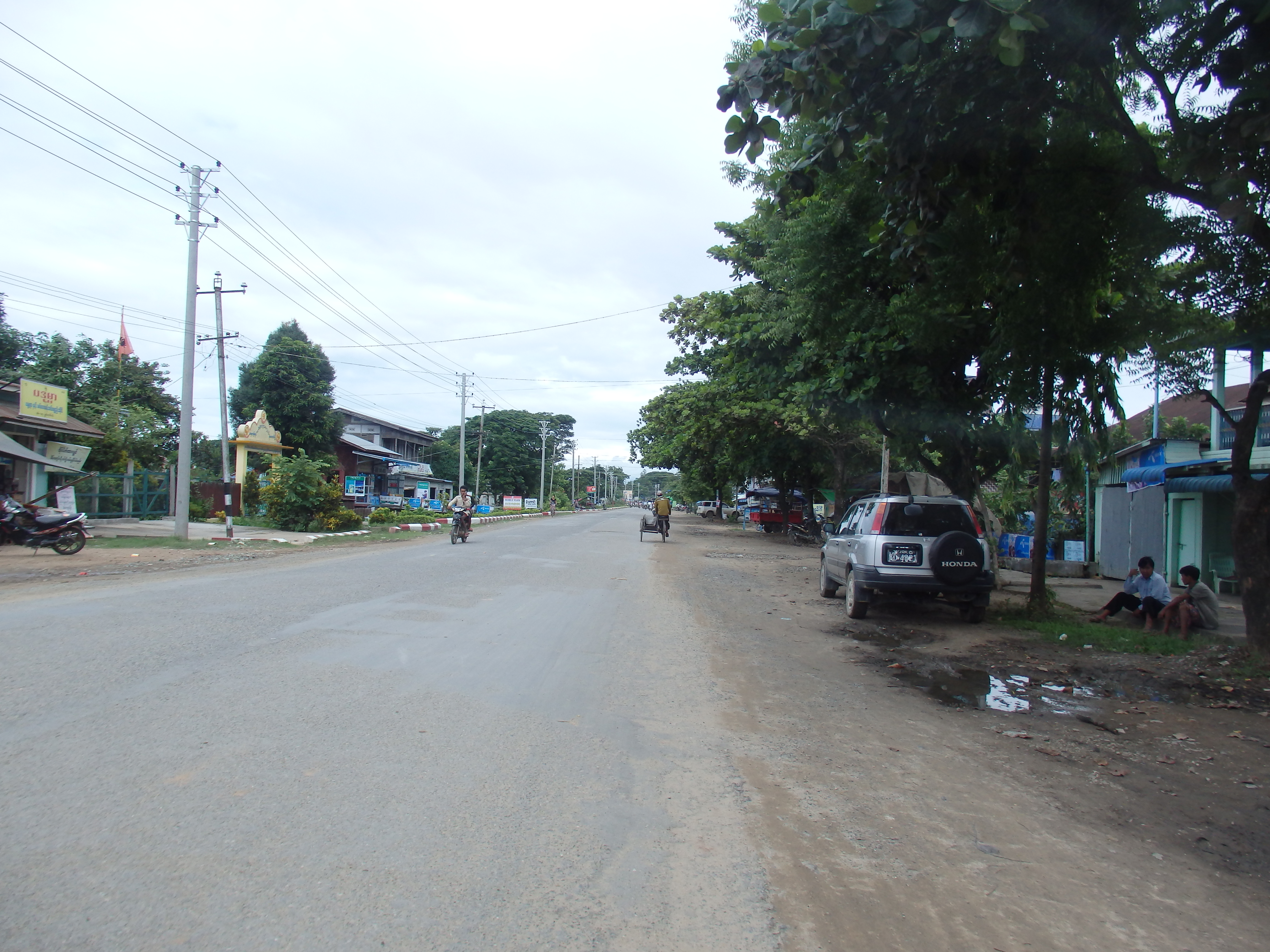
Mogaung, the capital of Möng Kawng, during day

According to legend, a predecessor state named Udiri Pale had been established in 58 BC. The area was said to have been inhabited by the Tai Long. According to Tai chronicles, the kingdom was founded in 1215 by a saopha named Sam Long Hpa, who ruled over an area stretching from Hkamti Lông to Shwebo, and extending into the country of the Nagas and Mishmis. Modern scholars disagree with the date of this history, and believe that Samlongpha belonged to the mid-14th century. Sam Long Hpa built his capital on the Nam Kawng river (present-day Mogaung river) and established it as a tributary state to Möng Mao.

According to Hsenwi state chronicle, the two generals Tao Hsö Yen and Tao Hsö Han Kai, who were sent with Sam Long Hpa to conquer Assam, sent on messengers to Hsö Hkan Hpa with a story that Sam Long Hpa had obtained the easy submission of Wehsali Long (Assam) by conspiring with the king of that place to dethrone Hsö Hkan Hpa. He believed the story and sent poisoned food to Sam Long Hpa, which he ate at Möng Kawng, where he died.

Möng Kawng and Möng Yang were occupied by China between 1479 and 1483, after regaining independence they were again briefly occupied by China in 1495.

From 1651 to 1742 the state was occupied by the Ava-based Kingdom of Burma and following a period of less than thirty years it was again occupied by Burma from 1771 to 1775. Finally Möng Kawng was annexed by the Ava Kingdom in 1796.

After becoming part of Burma, Möng Kawng was ruled by administrators named wuns. During British rule in Burma it became part of the Myitkyina District of the Mandalay Division.

In Chinese records, Möng Kawng first emerges in 1295 as Mengguang (蒙光), when a Tribal Command ruled by a native leader was set up by the Yuan dynasty, extending as far as the border with India (Xitian) by 1310.

In the Ming Shilu, the state was known as Mengyang and was under Yunnan as a pacification superintendency. In the same chronicle, the kingdom is said to extend to the east to Jinsha River in China, south to Ava-Burma, west to the territory of Da-Gula and to the north till Ganyai, a polity near Daying river.

It is asserted that it was originally under the territory of Lu-chuan and it is to Mongkawng and Da-Gula where Si Jifa, the ruler of Mong Mao fled after the destruction of Lu-chuan by the Chinese during the Luchuan–Pingmian campaigns (1436–49).

In 1477, the Ava Kingdom marched against Mogaung and captured it. After their submission, the Burmese chronicle records the King of Ava taking the Sawbwa of Mogaung and giving him the town of Tagaung to rule over.

== Rulers ==
The rulers of the state bore the title Saopha.

=== Saophas ===
- 603–633 Hkun Su (Youngest son of Hkun Lu) 1st-Möngkawng
- 633–653 Sao Hsen Saw (Son of Hkun Lu)
- 653–667 Sao Hkun Kyaw
- 667–668 Sao Hkun Kyun
- 938–9?? Sao Hkaw Hpa (2nd-Möngkawng)
- ---- – ---- Sao Haw Hseng
- ---- – ---- Hso Saw Hpa
- Sam Lung Hpa 1215–1228 son of Hso Hkwan Hpa 31rd Mong Mao saopha
- Hso Hkam Hpa (Nwe San Hpa) 1228–1248 nephew of Sam Lung Hpa
- Sao Hkun Law 1248–1308 son of Hso Hkam Hpa
- Sao Pu Rieng 1308–1344 son of Sao Hkun Law
- Hso Tai Hpa 1344–1346 son of Sao Pu Rieng
- Pwa Ngan Maing 1346–1361 son of Hso Tai Hpa
- Hkun Tau Hpa 1361–1381 son of Pwa Ngan Maing
- Hso Hung Hpa 1381–1411 son of Hkun Tau Hpa
- Hso Pin Hpa 1411–1446 son of Chau-Hung-Hpa
- Hso Si Hpa (Hso Kwon Hpa) 1446–1496 son of Hso Pin Hpa (He is brother of Hso Ngan Hpa 39rd Mong Mao saopha)
- Hso Kaa Hpa (Hso Kyeik Hpa) 1496–1520 son of Hso Si Hpa (Hso Kwon Hpa)
- Sam Lung paw-maing (Sao Sui-fin) 1520–1526 son of Hso Kaa Hpa (Hso Kyeik Hpa) Mong Mao line break off
- Sao Sui kwei (Sao Peng) 1526–1558 son of Sam Lung paw-maing (Sao Sui-fin)
- Hso Hom Hpa 1558–1564 son of Sao-Sui-kwei (Sao Peng)
- Hso Kaa Hpa 1564–1583 son of Hso Hom Hpa
- Sao Kon Hkam 1583–1591 son of Hso Kaa Hpa
- Hso Hung Hpa 1591–1605 son of Sao Kon Hkam (Temporarily independent from Burma)
- Hso Tit Hpa (Sao Kaa Maing) 1605–1626 grandson of Hso Hom Hpa 44rd saopha of Mong Mao
- Sao Sain Lung 1626–1639
- Lang Chu Paw 1639–1651
- Cheing Lung Ho Hup 1651–1663 adopted of Lang Chu Paw
- Sao Sui Yaw 1663–1673
- Sao Sui Kyek 1673–1729 grandson of Hso Hom Hpa 44rd saopha of Mong Mao
- Sao Hum (Sao Maung Pu) 1729–1739

born at Ava's palace

- Haw Seing 1739–1748 son of Sao Hum (Sao Maung Pu) 1st
- Haw Hkam 1748–1765 son of Haw Seing
- Haw Seing 1765–1768 son of Sao Hum (Sao Maung Pu) 2nd
- Maung Kiaw 1768–1771 Burmese his shan name is Haw Hkam
- Maung Piu 1771–1775 younger brother of Maung Kiaw
- Haw Seing 1775–1777 son of Sao Hum (Sao Maung Pu) 3rd

Vacant 1777–1785

- Sao Yaw Pan Kyung 1785-1796

== Bibliography ==
- Ferquist, Jon (2005), "Min-gyi-nyo, the Shan Invansions of Ava (1525-27), and the Beginnings of Expansionary Warfare in Toungoo Burma: 1486-1539", Bulletin of Burma Research, 2 (2)
- Wade, Geoffrey (1994), The Ming Shi-lu (Veritable Records of the Ming Dynasty) as a Source for Southeast Asian History -- 14th to 17th Centuries, Hong Kong
- Gogoi, Padmeswar (1956). The political expansion of the Mao Shans.
- Scott, James George (1967), Hsenwi State Chronicle
- Sun, Laichen (2000). Ming-Southeast Asian Overland Interactions, 1368-1644. University of Michigan. ISBN 978-0-599-83328-9.
