= Tamu, Myanmar =

Tamu တမူး
- Town
- Location in Myanmar
- Coordinates: 24°13′00″N 94°18′35″E
- Country: Myanmar
- Region: Sagaing Region
- District: Tamu
- Township: Tamu Township

Area
  - Total: 7.65 sq mi (19.81 km^{2})
- Elevation: 590 ft (180 m)

Population (2019)
  - Total: 42,549
  - Density: 5,563/sq mi (2,148/km^{2})
- Time zone: UTC+6.30 (MST)

Tamu is a town in the Kabaw Valley in the Sagaing Region in north-west Myanmar near the border with the eastern Indian state of Manipur. It is a principal town of the Kabaw Valley and the seat of administration for the Tamu Township. Opposite the Indian town of Moreh, it is home to an official border trade posts with India, which opened on 12 April 2005. In 2022, total trade volume at the border post stood at US$15.134 million.

== Transport ==
Tamu is something of a transport hub for cross-border traffic to India, being just across the border from Moreh. It is on the alignment of a proposed railway connecting the two countries. Tamu is an important commercial town serving the Indian border town of Moreh. It is also a hub for smuggled goods from Thailand and China which are transported to India. The town is mainly populated by the Burmese, Chin ethnic people, and many others from throughout the country.

=== Highway to Thailand ===
India's foreign minister met with Myanmar's construction minister in Delhi on 22 February 2012, and spoke about opening a highway between Moreh, in India, and the Myanmar-Thai border near Mae Sot.

== Climate ==
Climate data for Tamu, Myanmar (1981–2010)
Month	Jan	Feb	Mar	Apr	May	Jun	Jul	Aug	Sep	Oct	Nov	Dec	Year
Mean daily maximum °C (°F)	26.0 (78.8)	28.8 (83.8)	32.9 (91.2)	34.7 (94.5)	34.3 (93.7)	32.5 (90.5)	31.5 (88.7)	32.0 (89.6)	31.8 (89.2)	31.3 (88.3)	29.3 (84.7)	26.3 (79.3)	31.0 (87.8)
Mean daily minimum °C (°F)	7.6 (45.7)	9.9 (49.8)	14.1 (57.4)	18.1 (64.6)	20.4 (68.7)	22.1 (71.8)	22.1 (71.8)	21.8 (71.2)	21.3 (70.3)	18.7 (65.7)	14.3 (57.7)	9.1 (48.4)	16.6 (61.9)
Average rainfall mm (inches)	5.0 (0.20)	14.5 (0.57)	34.3 (1.35)	65.7 (2.59)	189.9 (7.48)	403.1 (15.87)	461.2 (18.16)	411.8 (16.21)	368.0 (14.49)	202.8 (7.98)	38.6 (1.52)	10.2 (0.40)	2,205.1 (86.81)
Source: Norwegian Meteorological Institute
