= Ningthourol Lambuba =

The Ningthourol Lambuba is an ancient historical document (puya), about the reign of the Meitei kings of Kangleipak.

It is a long roll of the monarchs with the activities of the kings of Manipur. The scripture contains 348 pages. It supplemented the Cheitharol Kumbaba, the state chronicle of the kingdom.

It records that Nongda Lairen Pakhangba was the first historical Meitei king of ancient Manipur.
