= Cheitharol Kumbaba =

Court chronicle of the kings of Manipur

Cheitharol Kumbaba or Cheithalon Kumpapa (Ch. K.), the "Royal Chronicle of Manipur", is a court chronicle of the kings of Manipur, which claims to start from 33 CE and to cover the rule of 76 Kings until 1955. The work of chronicling actually began during the reign of King Kiyamba in 1485 CE. The earlier events were reconstructed later during the reign of Bhagyachandra, presumably from oral sources or from scattered written records. According to scholar Saroj Nalini Parratt, the earlier parts have relatively little detail but contain numerous inaccuracies. But they are still said to be useful in reconstructing Manipur's early history.

== Etymology ==
Ancient Meitei counting methods involved sticks (chei) being placed (thapa) to represent a base number. Kum signifies a period of time and paba is a verb meaning to read or reckon. The chronicle's title therefore connotes the "placing of sticks or using a base as a means of reckoning the period of time, the years" and is indicative of the Meitei approach to counting and recording.

== Description ==
The oldest extant version was copied in the early 19th century, under Ching-Thang Khomba (Bhagyachandra or Jai Singh), as "the former copy was no more available". It is the main source for the list of pre-modern kings of Manipur, tracing the genealogy of the ruling Ningthouja dynasty back to a ruler named Nongda Lairen Pakhangba, said to have ruled for more than a century, from 33–154 CE. It is to the Meiteis what the Buranji is to the Assamese and the Yazawin to the Burmese.

Ch. K is regarded as the primary source concerning ancient and medieval Manipur. It dates the first king to 33 CE. However, the historical record herein up to the reign of King Kyampa (1467–1508 CE) are noted to have been redrafted during the reign of Ching-Thang Khomba (Bhagyachandra) in the mid- to late-18th century because those leaves were "lost". This part of the chronicle remains particularly unreliable. The kings of that period are assigned extraordinary spans of length, and there is a scarcity of objective information. Saroj Nalili Parratt hypothesizes that many of these monarchs were probably borrowed from the cultural pantheon and interspersed with religious myths to fit into their collective memory of intra-clan conquests and legitimize the current rule by the Meitei. Parratt as well as Gangmumei Kamei suspect that the initiation date of 33 CE was arrived upon by the scribes via astrological calculations.

Ch. K. is also a Meitei chronicle – Meitei being one of the migrant clans, originally named Ningthouja, who (at some unknown point of time) assimilated others into a confederacy, and gained rulership of the monarchy – with the early sections being essentially themed on the expansion of the Meitei across the valley of Manipur and other exploits.

== Bengali versions ==
Cheitharol Kumbaba was transliterated to Bengali script by Pundit Thongam Madhob Singh and published by Vishvabharati Mandir c. 1940. With Maharaja Churchand Singh's permission, the chronicle was edited by L. Ibungohal Singh and Pundit N. Khelchandra Singh and published by the Manipuri Sahitya Parishad in 1967; this edited version is the Hindu-oriented version. The Sanamahi followers (people of Kangleipak) do not want to consider the book edited by Khelchandra Singh as a final version as he added many words which are imported from Sanskrit and Hindi in his translation.

== English versions ==
In 1891, Major Maxwell, the Political Agent of Manipur, instructed the court to translate the Cheitharol Kumbaba into English. The translation was carried out by a Bengali clerk named Mamacharan. It was edited and published by L. Joychandra Singh in 1995 under the title The Lost Kingdom.

A Meitei scholar, Saroj N. Arambam Parratt, produced another English version of the Chronicle under the title The Court Chronicle of the Kings of Manipur: Cheitharon Kumpapa in 2005. Parratt includes a facsimile of the original manuscript of the Cheitharol Kumbaba. The Cheitharol Kumbaba adopted three chronological systems or eras: Kalyabda, Saka era, Chandrabda or Kangleipak era. From 1666 CE onwards, days of the week are mentioned in the Cheitharol Kumbaba.

In 2010, Rajkumar Somorjit Sana produced an edited English version of the Cheitharol Kumbaba with the corresponding Western dates for each Meitei date under the title The Chronology of Meetei Monarchs (From 1666 CE to 1850 CE) (Imphal: Waikhom Ananda Meetei, 2010). In 2012, Mr. Nepram Bihari, a retired bureaucrat of Manipur made another translation of Cheitharol Kumbaba into English. It took him 17 years to complete the task.

== See also ==
- Kingdom of Pong
- Meitei literature
