= Sports in Manipur =

Manipur is home to a population playing many different sports.

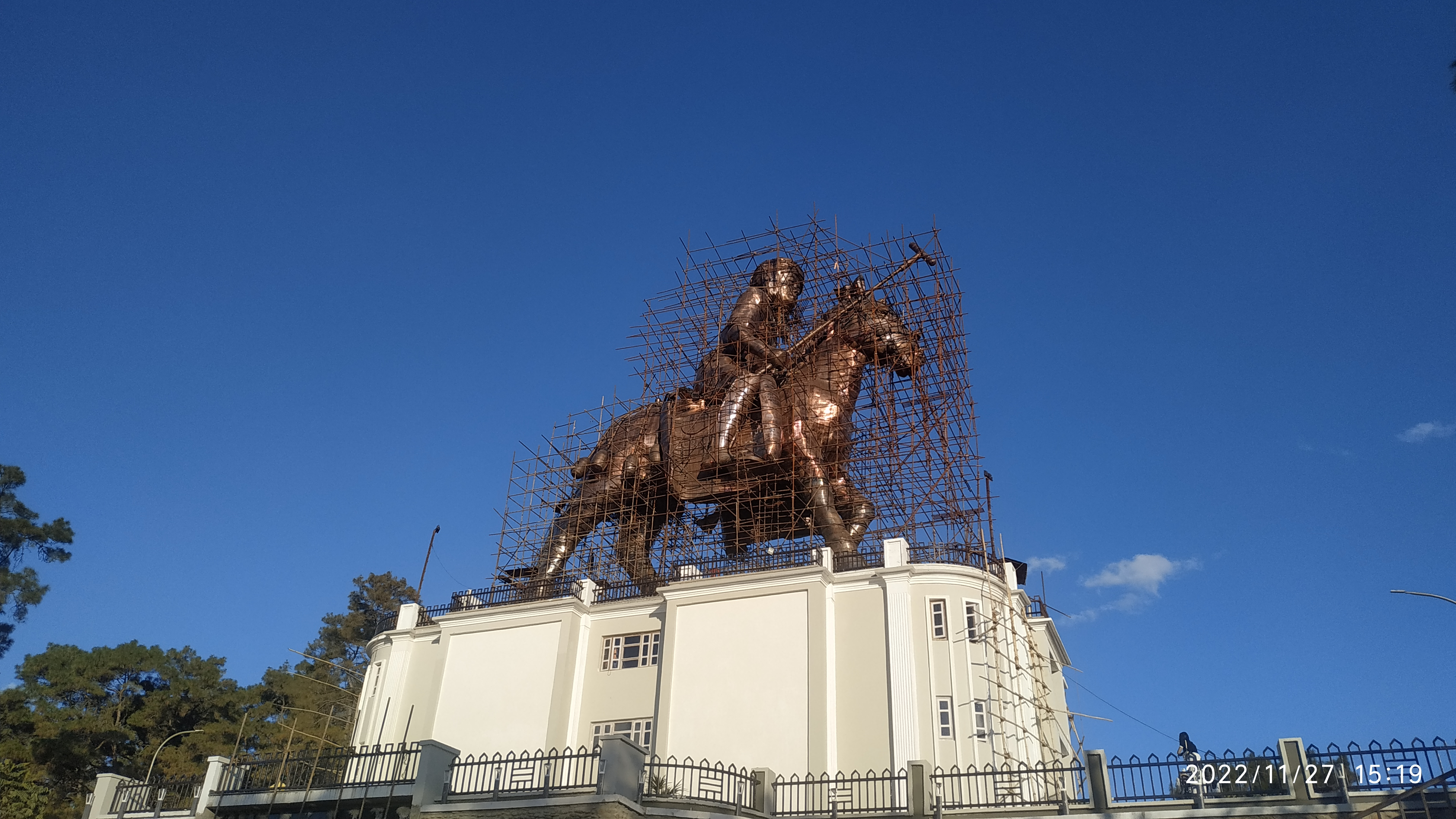
Marjing Polo Statue, the world's tallest polo player statue, standing inside the Marjing Polo Complex, dedicated to God Marjing, the Meitei deity of polo sports, in the Heingang Ching

== Outdoor sports ==
Outdoor sports include Mukna, Mukna Kangjei (or Khong kangjei), Sagol Kangjei (Polo), Yubi lakpi (Coconut Rugby), Oo-Laobi, Hiyang Tannaba (Boat Rowing Race), and Arambai Hunba.

=== Mukna (wrestling) ===
Mukna is a popular form of wrestling. It has rules agreed by all Mukna organisations and with Royal Consent. Traditionally the game is controlled and organised by Pana Loisang of the Ruler of the state and village organisations. There are four, Panas-Ahallup, Naharup, Khabam and Laipham, who control all fixtures and times for the games and the State Meet in which the Final is attended by the ruler, who presents the title of Jatra (Champion) for the year along with a reward of Thum Nama (A full bag of salt), and Ngabong Phi (hand made cloth of cotton yarn), exemption of all state duties and Ningham Samjin dress (traditional). The game has two categories (1) Takhatnabi (League), (2) Naitom (Knockout).

=== Mukna Kangjei (Khong Kangjei) ===
Mukna Kangjei is a game which combines the arts of mukna (wrestling hockey) and Kangjei (Cane Stick) to play the ball made of seasoned bamboo roots. The origin of the game dates to Aniconic worship. People celebrate Lai Haraoba (festival to please traditional deities) and include this item to mark the end of the festival. It was believed that Khagemba Ningthou (King, 1597–1652) patronised this game. In later generations, the game is organised in the villages. Presently, associations are formed in Panas with rules and regulations of Mukna Kangjei.

=== Polo ===
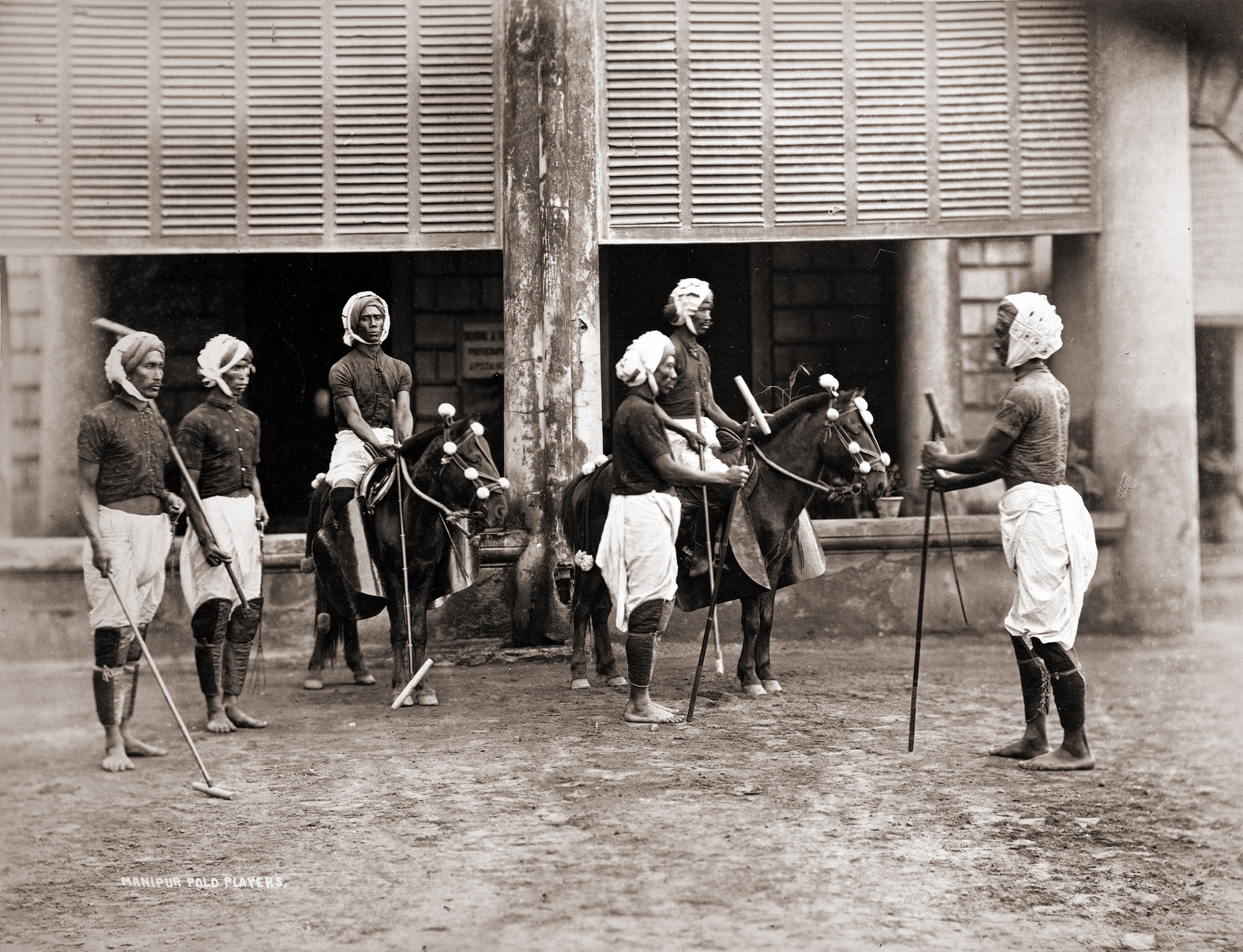
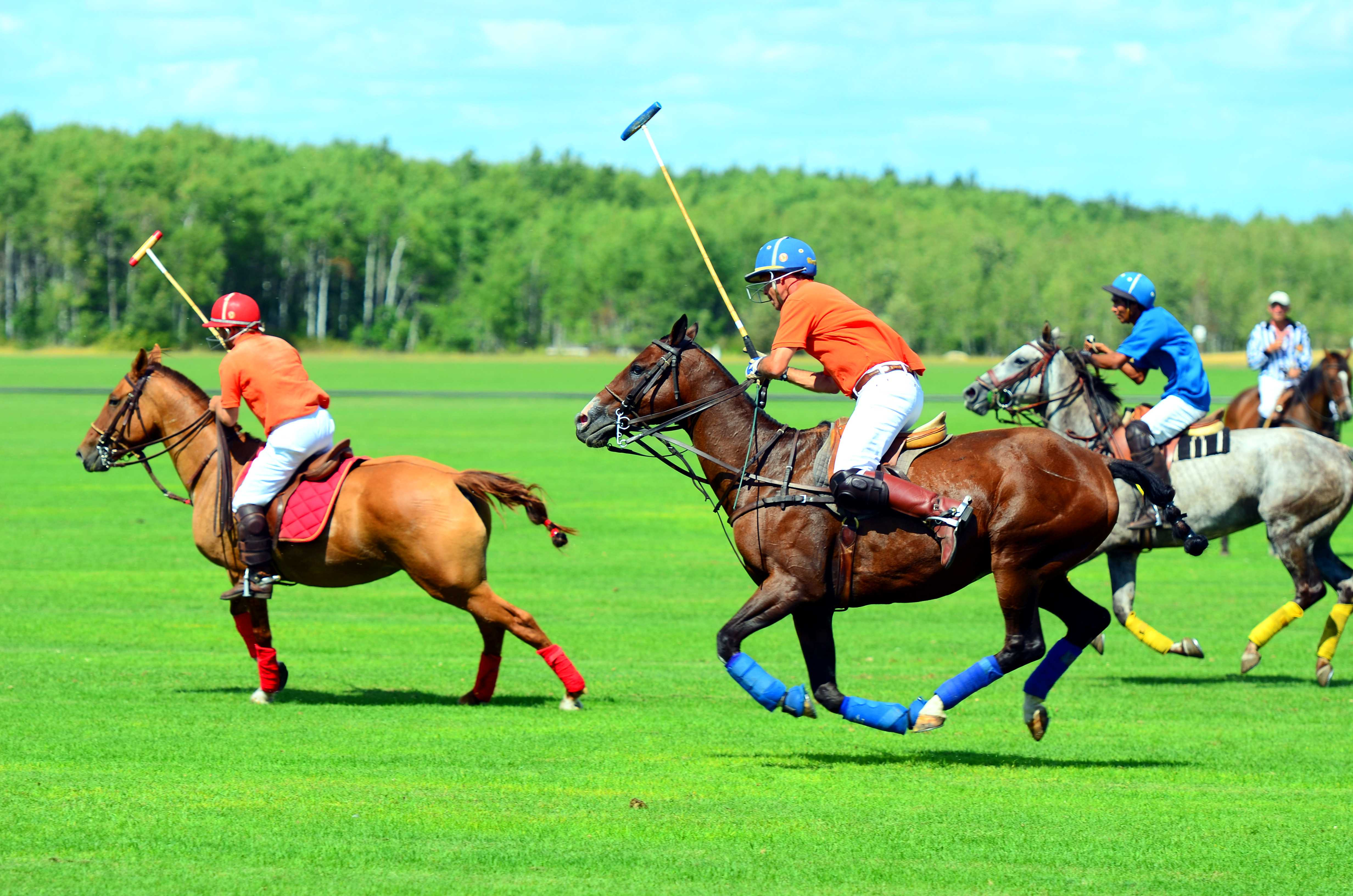
The spread of rules-based Polo game from Manipur in 19th century (above) to Europe & North America in 21st century (below).

According to Chaitharol-Kumbaba, a Royal Chronicle of Manipur King Kangba who ruled Manipur much earlier than Nongda Lairen Pakhangba (33 AD) introduced Polo. It was played regularly by 17th century during the reign of King Khagemba under newly framed rules of the game. During the time of the late Sir Chandrakirti Singh, K.C.S.I Maharaja of Manipur introduced regular game at Mapal Kangjeibung (now near Tikendrajit Park) on the ground of Sana-Lamjei (60 by 160 yards (55 by 146 m) width in dimension) being one Lamjei equal to 6 ft (1.8 m). The game can be played in smaller ground also if occasion demands.

Captain Robert Stewart and Lieutenant Joseph Sherer of British colonial era watched locals play this rules-based pulu or sagolkangjei (literally, horse and stick) game in 1859, rules they spread as Polo, first to Calcutta and then in England. Joseph Ford Sherer is now celebrated as the Father of English Polo, and Manipur as part of Polo legend. Polo spread rapidly, and by 1900 was part of Summer Olympics.

Manipur has produced notable players such as Jubaraj Bir Tikendraji (Senapati of Manipur Army) as legendary player described by Mrs. Grimwood (1887–90).

=== Yubi lakpi ===
Yubi lakpi is a traditional full contact game played in Manipur, India, using a coconut, which has some notable similarities to rugby. Yubi lakpi literally means "coconut snatching". The coconut is greased to make it slippery. There are rules of the game, as with all Manipur sports. It is played on the lush green turf. Each side has 7 players in a field with about 45x18 meters in area. The goal post is 4.5x3 meters box in the central portion of the goal line. The coconut serves the purpose of a ball and is offered to the king, the chief guest or the judges before the game begins. The aim is to run while carrying the greased coconut and physically cross over the goal line, while the other team tackles and blocks any such attempt as well as tries to grab the coconut and score on its own. In Manipur's long history, Yubi lakpi was the annual official game, attended by the king, over the Hindu festival of Shree Govindajee. It is like the game of rugby, or American football.

=== Oolaobi ===
Oolaobi (Woo-Laobi) is an outdoor game mainly played by females. Meitei mythology believes that UmangLai Heloi-Taret (seven deities–seven fairies) played this game on the Courtyard of the temple of Umang Lai Lairembi. The number of participants is not fixed but are divided into two groups (size as per agreement). Players are divided as into Attackers (Raiders) or Defenders (Avoiders).

The Raiders say "oo" without stopping as long as they can continue and try to touch the Avoiders. If a Raider touches an Avoider while saying "oo", the Avoider is out. This process goes on till all Avoiders are out or surrender. If a raider fails to say "oo" or is out of breath, the Raider is out. Points are counted on the elimination of Raiders/Defenders.

If Raiders are tired they declare for change and a time limit is decided on. The principles of Oolaobi are very similar to Kabaddi in India. The ground (court) is not marked; normally the open space in the premises of the house or temple is used for the game. Oolaobi, sometimes spelled Woolaobi, is very popular with girls and a source of talent in Kabaddi.

=== Hiyang Tannaba ===
Hiyang tannaba (Hiyangba Tanaba) is a traditional boat rowing race and festivity of the Panas. This is held during the month of November. This was introduced during the time of Ningthourel Khunjaoba, the second son of King Khagemba, who dug the Kangla Moat around the Palace to make it impregnable in the year of 1660 after he ascended the throne in 1652. In the traditional function two boats "Tanahi" (Race Boat) are detailed for leaders known as "Tengmai Lappa". In each boat forty Hiroys (Boatsman) operate the boat. The boat which reaches the finishing line is the winner and all boatsman raise their (Now) oars high in the air as a sign of reaching the finishing line first and thus the winner of the race is declared. The leader pays his respect to the deity and the King of Manipur.

=== Arambai Hunba ===
People of Manipur are very fond of riding horses specially those who are in the village near the breeding areas. Since the ponies are easily available, the young boys get the chance of riding ponies without saddle on horse back. Sometimes they ride horse using a rope in place of regular bridle throwing branches of small trees in place of Arambai. This practice helped the Manipur Arambai force as a martial art which was very much required during the advance and withdrawal of forces. This art was very popular as an indigenous game of the youth of Manipur. This game is displayed even now, during the festival "Kwak Jatra" after Durga Puja.

Some outdoor games formerly played by children are nearly extinct. These include Khutlokpi, Phibul Thomba, and Chaphu Thugaibi They are played especially during the Khmer New Year.

== Indigenous indoor games ==
=== Kang ===
Kang is played by both male and female Meities of Manipur. Manipuris believe Kang is a game played by deity Panthoibi. It is also believed that Manipuris began to play this game well before Vaishnavism came to Manipur. It is played under a shed of building on an earth ground (court) smoothly levelled to suit the course of the 'Kang' the target on the court. It is well marked for the respective positions of the players of both to hit the target on the court. It has rules and regulations formed by the associations to suit the occasions of the games either for competitive tournaments or friendly entertainment. The dignitaries of the Palace, even Queen and King also participated on social functions. In olden days 'Kang' was played during summer, starting from Cheiraoba (Manipur New Year) to Kang Chingba. Presently the game is played in several tournaments throughout the year, organised by the Associations. Rules and regulations have been modified to suit the improved process of the game.

== Non-indigenous sports ==
=== Baseball ===
Baseball was played in Manipur as early as World War II when the US Army Air Forces flew supplies to China over the Himalayas, known as "Flying the Hump", and the locals learned the game from the troops stationed there. The 2013 film The Only Real Game shows how baseball has grown in Manipur since then because it helps local people cope with stagnation and insurgency in their society.
