= Animals in Meitei culture =

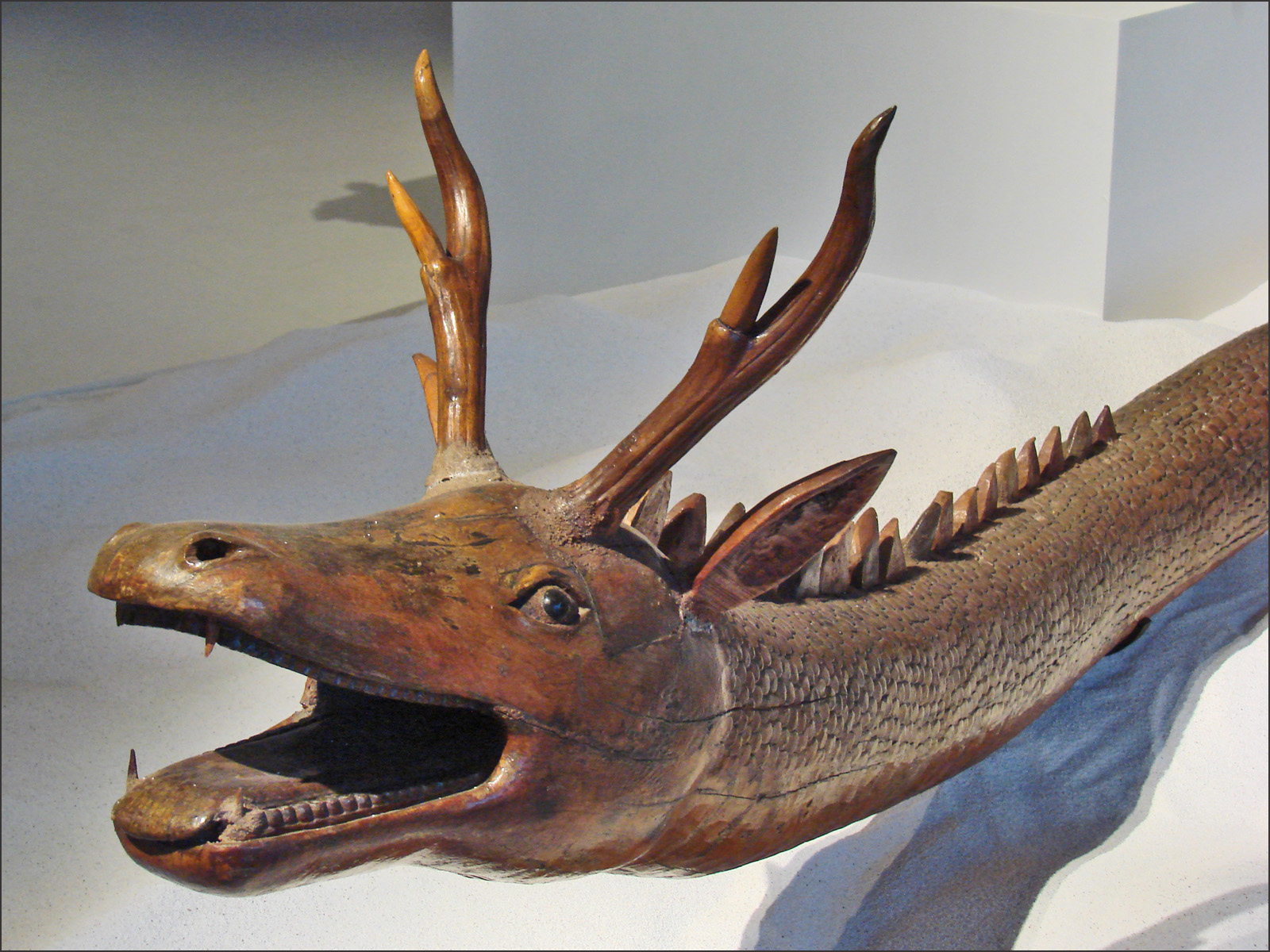
A sculpture of Poubi Lai in the Quai Branly Museum, Paris, France, in 2010

Animals (Meitei: Saa/Shaa) have significant roles in different elements of Meitei culture, including Meitei cuisine, Meitei dances, Meitei festivals, Meitei folklore, Meitei folktales, Meitei literature, Meitei mythology, and Meitei religion.

== Deer ==
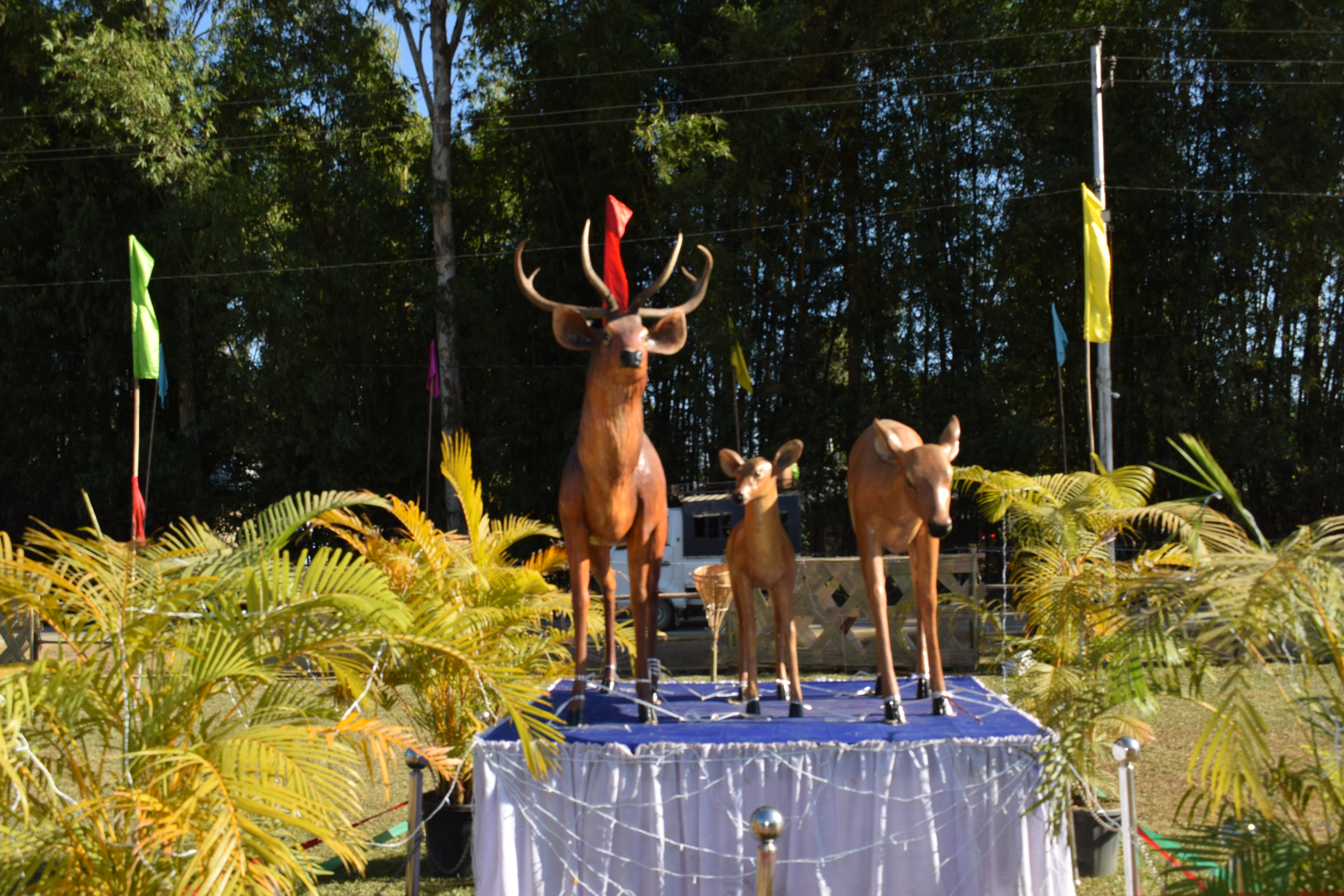
Replicas of Sangai deer installed in the Sangai festival, an annual event organised in honor of this Cervus species in Manipur

In one of the epic cycles of incarnations in Moirang, Kadeng Thangjahanba hunted and brought a lovely Sangai deer alive from a hunting ground called "Torbung Lamjao" as a gift of love for his girlfriend, Lady Tonu Laijinglembi.

However, when he heard the news that his sweetheart lady married King Laijing Ningthou Punsiba of ancient Moirang, during his absence, he got extremely disappointed and sad. And so, with the painful and sad feelings, he realised and sensed the feelings of the deer for getting separated from its mate (partner). So, he released the deer in the wild of the Keibul Lamjao (modern day Keibul Lamjao National Park regions). Since then, the Sangai species started living in the Keibul Lamjao region as their natural habitat.

== Dogs ==
Dogs are mentioned as friends or companions of human beings, in many ancient tales and texts. In many cases, when dogs died, they were given respect by performing elaborate death ceremonies, equal to that of human beings.

When goddess Konthoujam Tampha Lairembi saw smokes in her native place, she was restless. She came down to earth from heaven to find out who was dead. On reaching the place, her mother told her as follows:

O daughter of mine, none of your parents or brothers ever dies. The watchful dog of your Lord Soraren kept amidst us was fatally bitten by a snake. Only we performed its last rites.

— Konthoucham Nongkalol (Konthoujam Nonggarol)

== Elephants ==
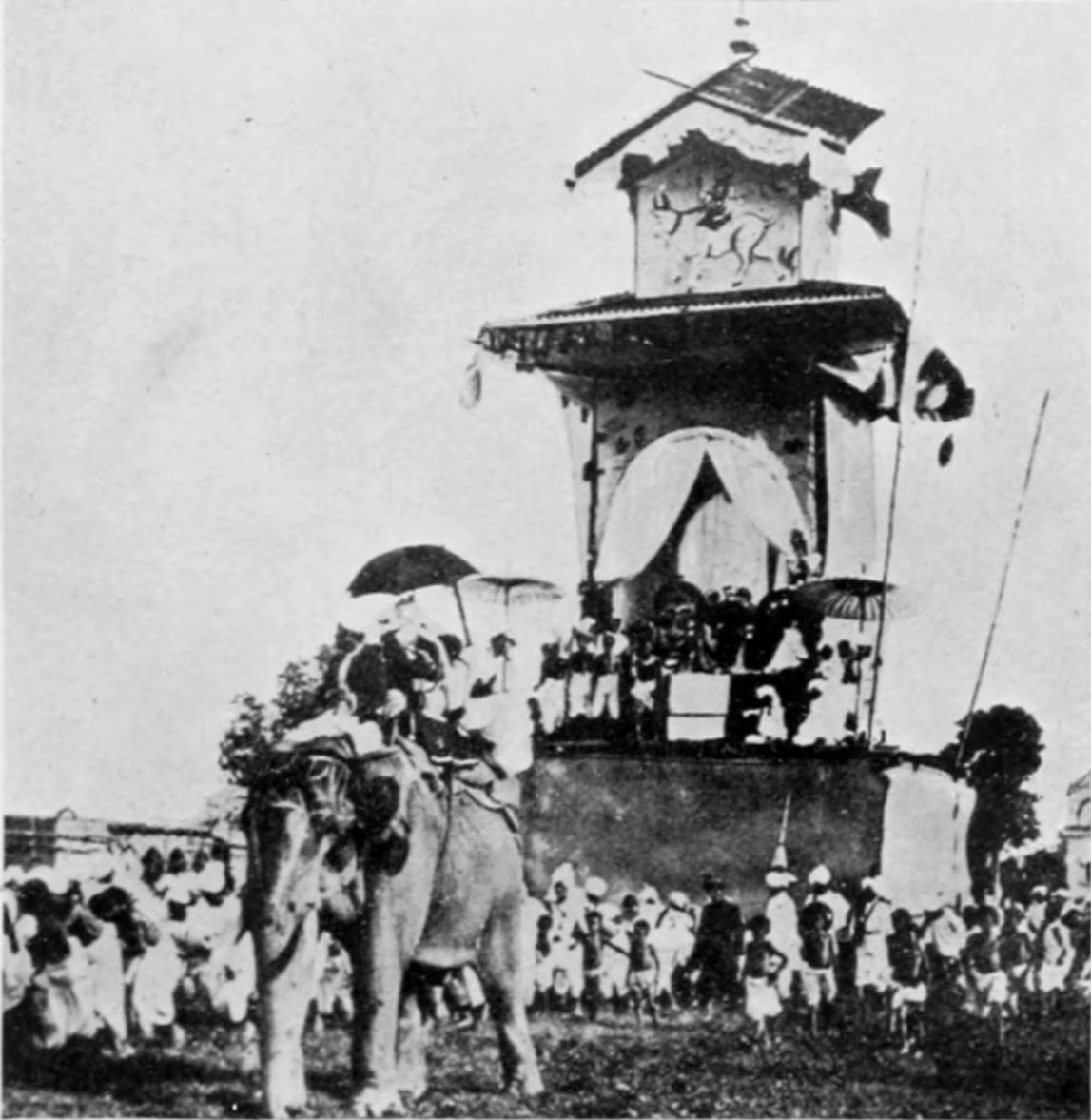
"Kang Chingba" festival celebrated by the Meitei people in Manipur in the 20th century

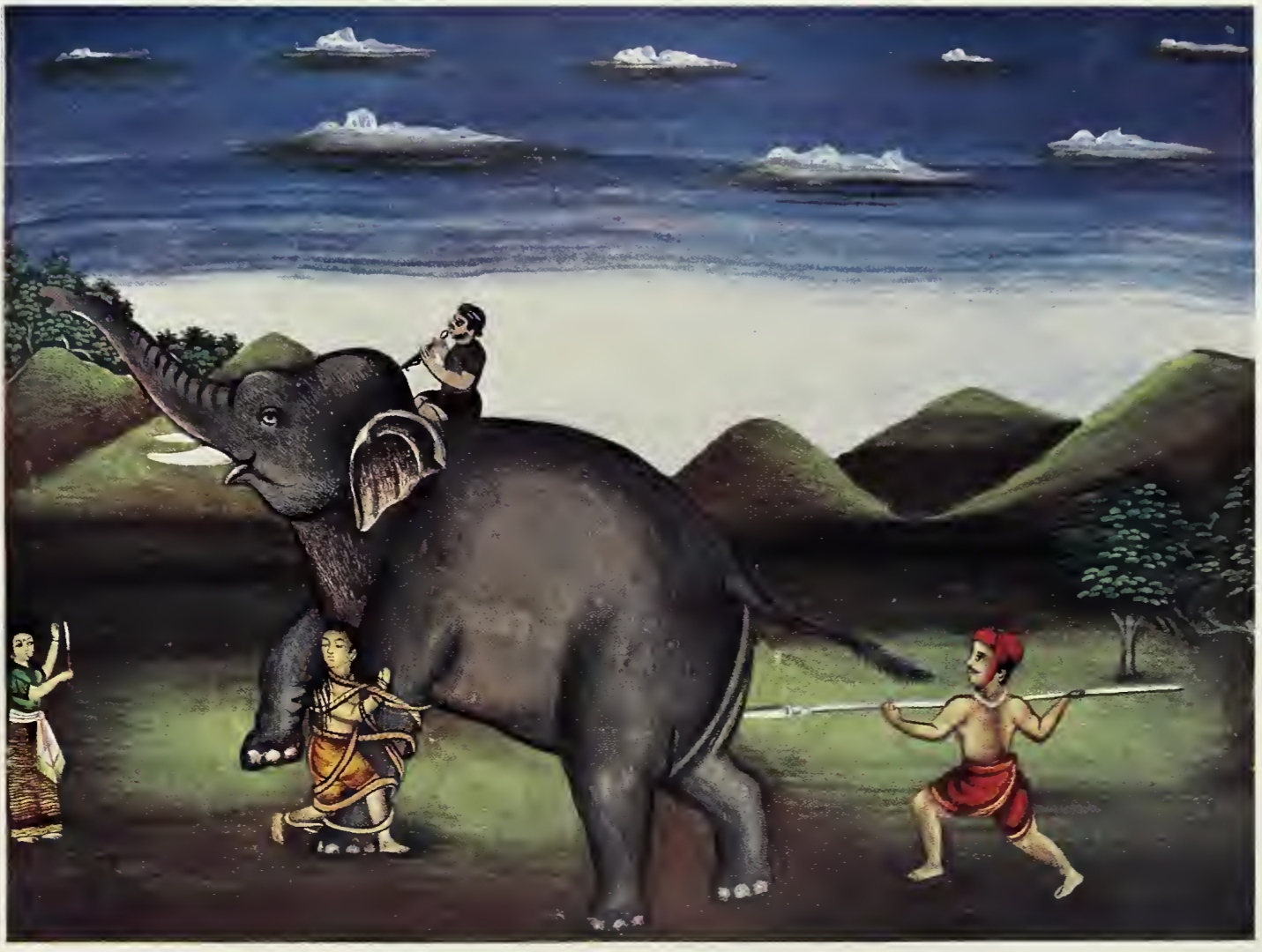
An elephant torturing Khuman Khamba in the Meitei epic legend of Khamba and Thoibi of Moirang, southern Kangleipak

In the Meitei epic of the Khamba and Thoibi, the crown prince Chingkhu Akhuba of ancient Moirang and Kongyamba, planned to kill to Khuman Khamba. Kongyamba and his accomplices together threatened Khamba to give up Moirang Thoibi, which Khamba rejected. Then they fought, and Khamba bet all of them, and was about to kill Kongyamba, but the men that stood by, the friends of Kongyamba, dragged Khamba off, and bound him to the elephant of the crown prince, with ropes. Then they goaded the elephant, but the God Thangching stayed it so that it didn't move. Finally, Kongyamba lost patience. He pricked a spear to the elephant so that it moved in the pain. But it still didn't harm Khamba. Khamba seemed to be dead. Meanwhile, on the other hand, Goddess Panthoibi came in a dream to Thoibi and told her everything that was happening. So, Thoibi rushed to the spot and saved Khamba from the elephant torture.

== Fishes ==
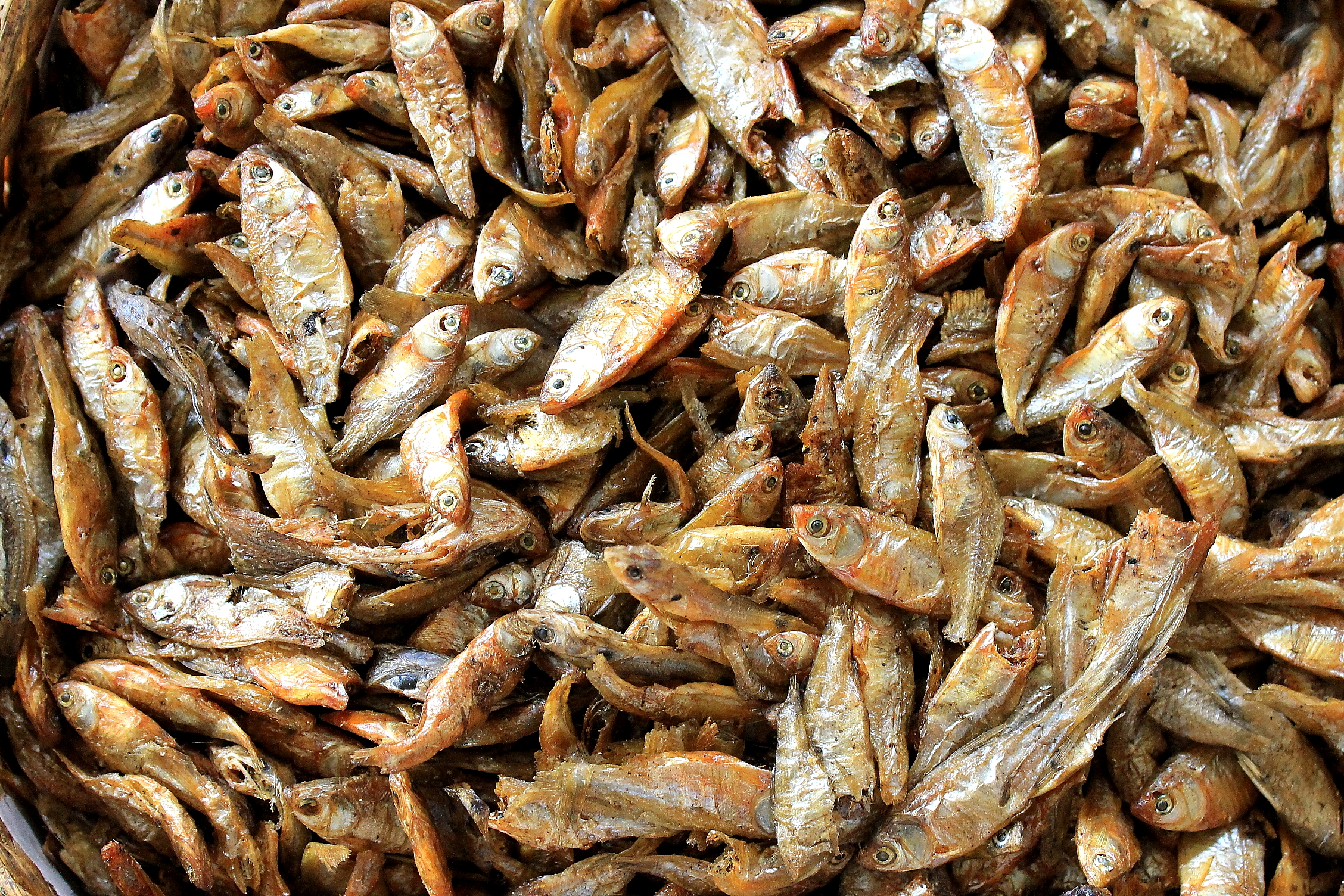
Dried freshwater fish sold at the Ima Keithel (Meitei for 'Ima Market') in Imphal

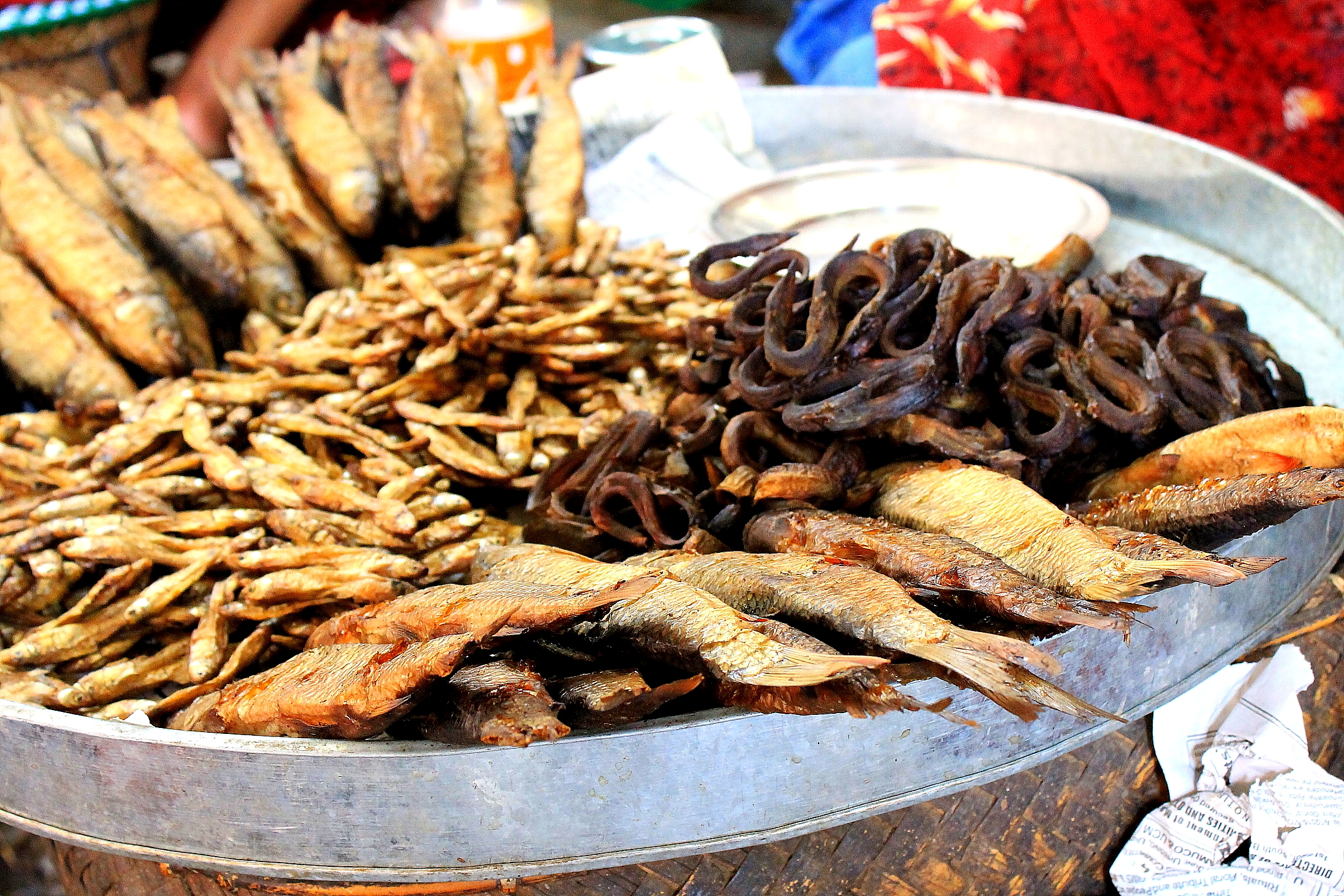
Dried freshwater fish sold at the Ima Keithel (Meitei for 'Ima Market') in Imphal

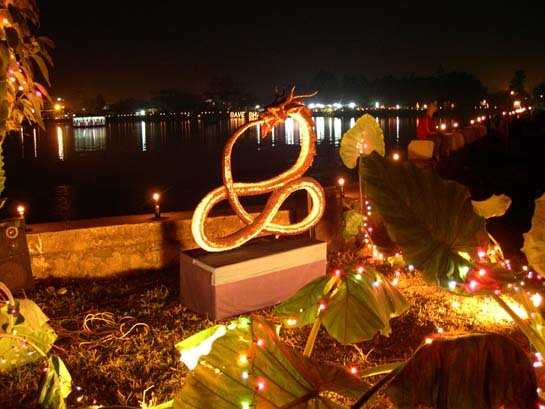
This is what Pakhangba is said to look like. He is a very powerful, strong-minded dragon. He has the respect of those around him.

== Horses ==
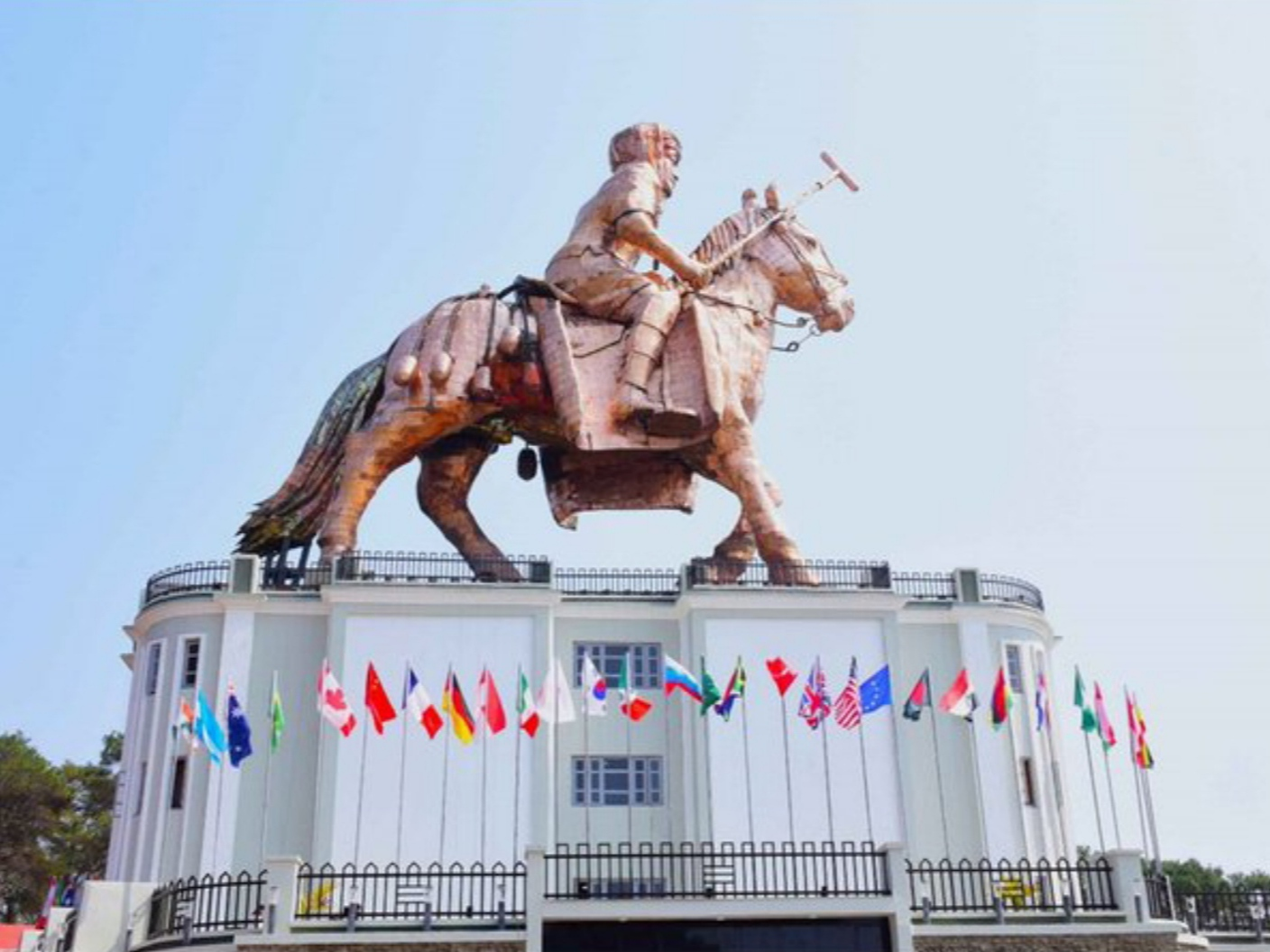
Marjing Polo Statue, the world's tallest polo player statue, standing inside the Marjing Polo Complex, dedicated to God Marjing, the ancient Meitei deity of Sagol Kangjei (Meitei for 'polo') and Meitei horses (Manipuri pony), in the Heingang Ching

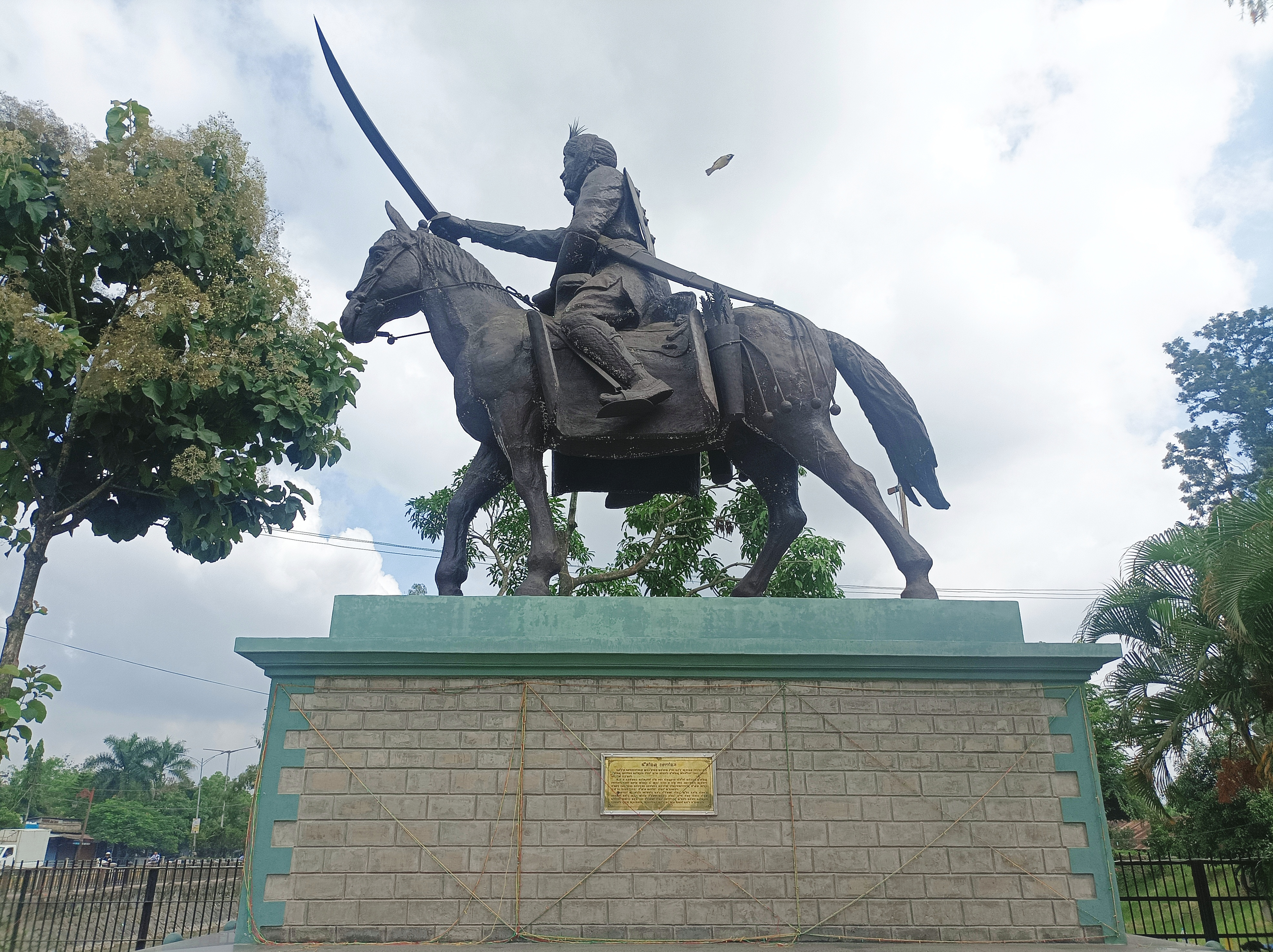
Statue of Meidingu Nara Singh (1844-1850 A.D.) in front of the Kangla Sanathong, the Western Entrance to the Kangla Fort in Imphal

== Lions ==
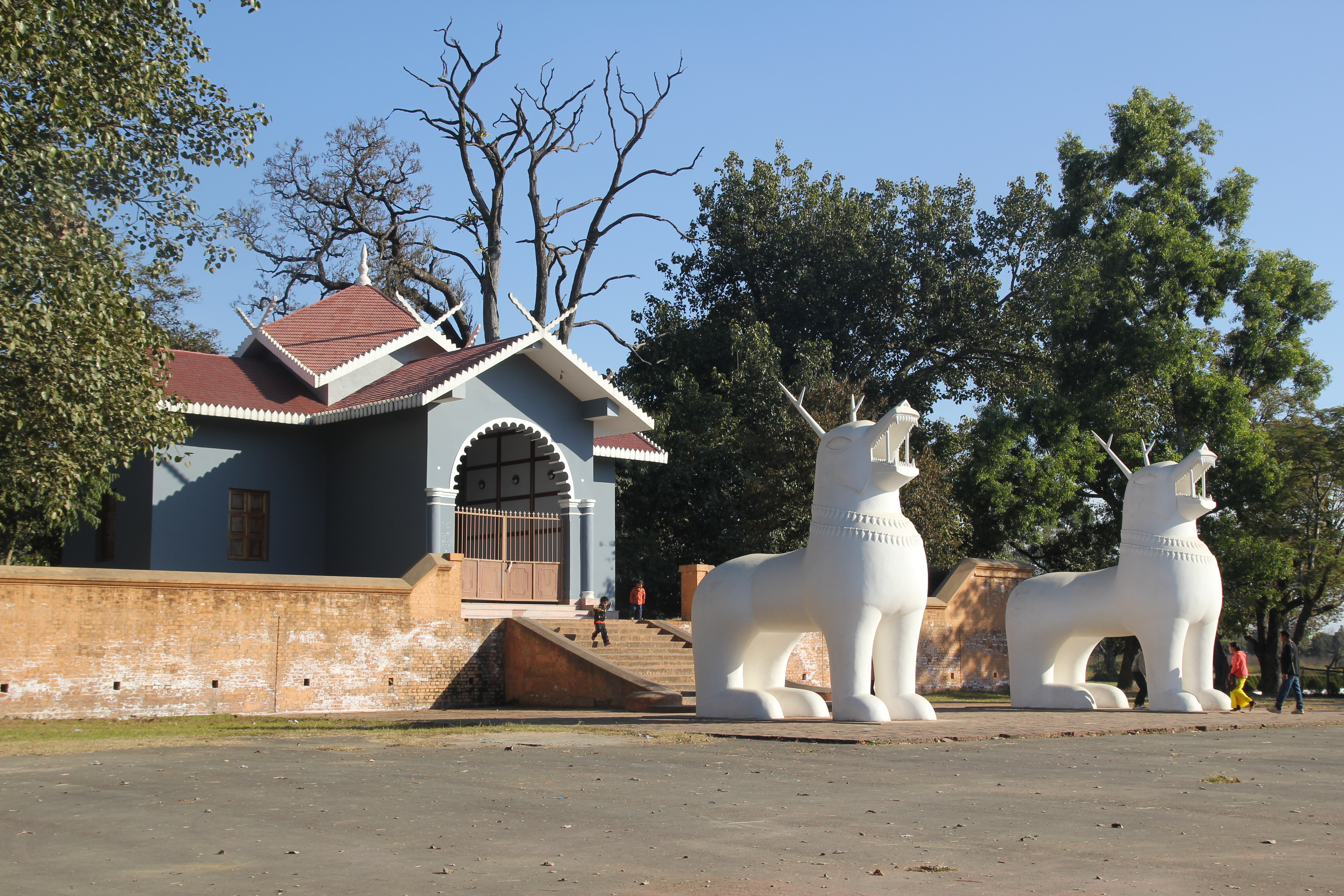
The dual statues dedicated to Kangla Sha alias Nongshaba, the dragon lion of Meitei religion, installed inside the Kangla Fort of Kangleipak

=== Kanglā Shā ===
In Meitei mythology and religion, Kangla Sa (Meitei for 'Beast of the Kangla'), also spelled as Kangla Sha, is a guardian dragon lion, whose appearance is described as a creature with a lion's body and a dragon's head, and two horns. Besides being sacred to the Meitei cultural heritage, it is frequently portrayed in the royal symbol of the Meitei royalties (Ningthouja dynasty). The most popular iconographic colossal statues of the "Kangla Sa" stand inside the Kangla Fort in Imphal.

In Meitei traditional race competitions, winners of the race are declared only after symbolically touching the statue of the dragon "Kangla Sha". This ideology is clearly mentioned in the story of the marathon competition between Khuman Khamba and Nongban in the epic saga of Khamba and Thoibi of ancient Moirang.

=== Nongshāba ===
In Meitei religion mythology, Nongshaba (Meitei: ꯅꯣꯡꯁꯥꯕ) is a Lion God and a king of the gods. He produced light in the primordial universe and is often addressed as the "maker of the sun". He is worshipped by the Meitei people, specifically by those of the Ningthouja clans as well as the Moirang clans. He was worshipped by the Meitei people of Moirang clan as an ancestral lineage God. He is the chief of all the Umang Lais (Meitei for 'forest gods') in Ancient Kangleipak (early Manipur).

=== Pakhangba ===
In Meitei culture, Pakhangba is a very powerful dragon. He is known as a protector and ruler of the universe. He is a son to Mother Earth. Pakhangba is, no question, one of the most distinctive frightening dragons. He is known for having remote resemblances and equivalencies to Typhon of the Greeks, Bahamut of the Arabians, Nagas of the Hindus, and Quetzalcoatl of the Native Americans. His identity is the subject of numerous stories, some of which even combine him with significant historical figures.

== Monkeys ==
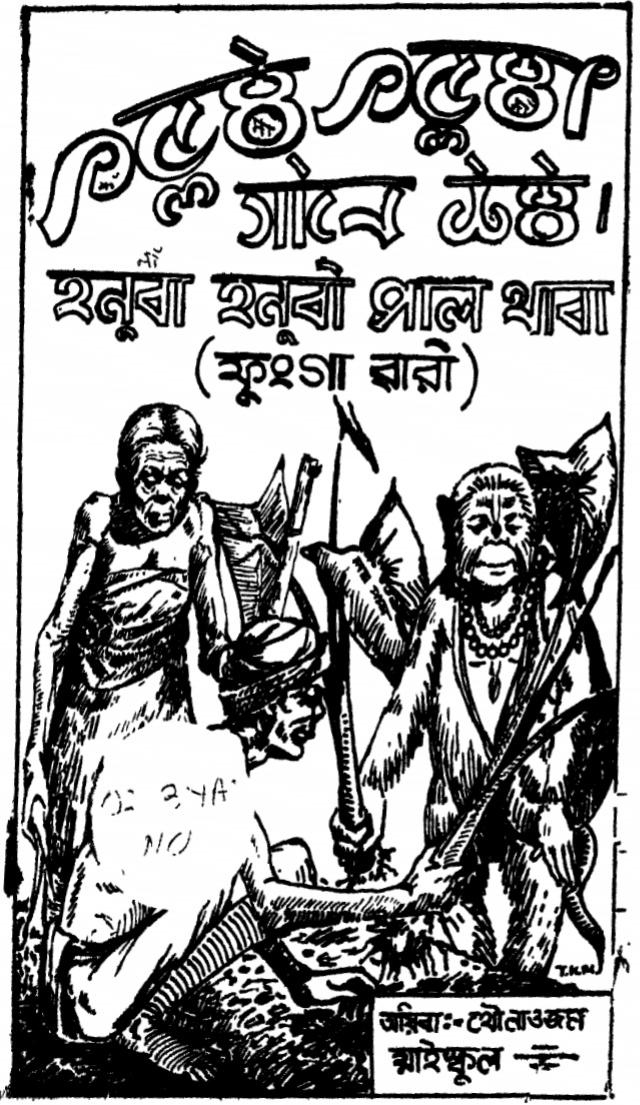
An illustration of a Meitei folktale of the Hanuba Hanubi Paan Thaaba, the story of an old aged lonely couple being tricked by a group of monkeys

The Meitei folktale of Hanuba Hanubi Paan Thaaba (Meitei for 'Old Man and Old Woman planting Colocasia/Taro'), also known as the Hanubi Hentak! Hanuba Hentak!, is about the story of an old couple who were tricked by a gang of monkeys.

In the story, a childless old couple treat a group of monkeys, from the nearby forest kindly, like their own children. The monkeys give the old couple advice about planting taro in their kitchen garden. So, according to their suggestion, they boie the tubers in a pot until soft, then cooled them, wrapped them in banana leaves, and plant them in the garden. At midnight, the monkeys secretly steal and eat all the cooked taro and plant some inedible giant wild taro in their place. The next day, the old couple find the fully grown taro. They immediately cook and eat the full-grown taro and suffer an allergic reaction. Only after they take the hentak medicine is their allergy relieved. Realising they have been tricked, the old couple plan their revenge. So, the old man pretends to be dead, and the old woman cries out loudly so that the monkeys hear her. When the monkeys come and ask her what happened, she tells them that the old man died after eating the taro. She asks them to help her carry old man's body out to the lawn. As soon as the monkeys enter the housthe old man takes up his stick and beats them. Frightened, they all ran away. The old couple know that the monkeys will come back. So, they climb into the attic and hide. When the monkeys return a larger gang to take revenge, the attic breaks and falls on them, and they flee. Knowing that they might come back again, the old couple hide inside a large pot. When the monkeys come back, the couple farted continuously and the sound scares the monkeys, who flee and never return.

== Pythons ==
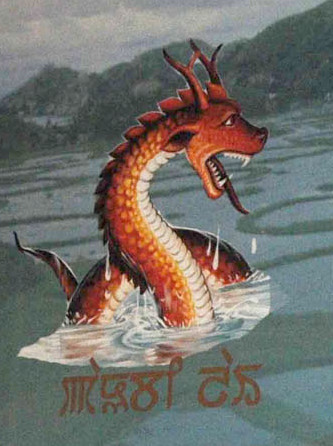
An illustration of Poubi Lai in 2015

In Meitei mythology, Poubi Lai (Meitei: ꯄꯧꯕꯤ ꯂꯥꯏ) was an ancient python. It lived in the deep waters of the Loktak Lake. It is also referred to as the "Loch Ness Monster of Manipur".

== Rodents ==
In Meitei mythology, Shapi Leima (Meitei: ꯁꯄꯤ ꯂꯩꯃ), is one of the three favorite daughters of the sky god and mistress and the queen of all rodents.

== Tigers ==
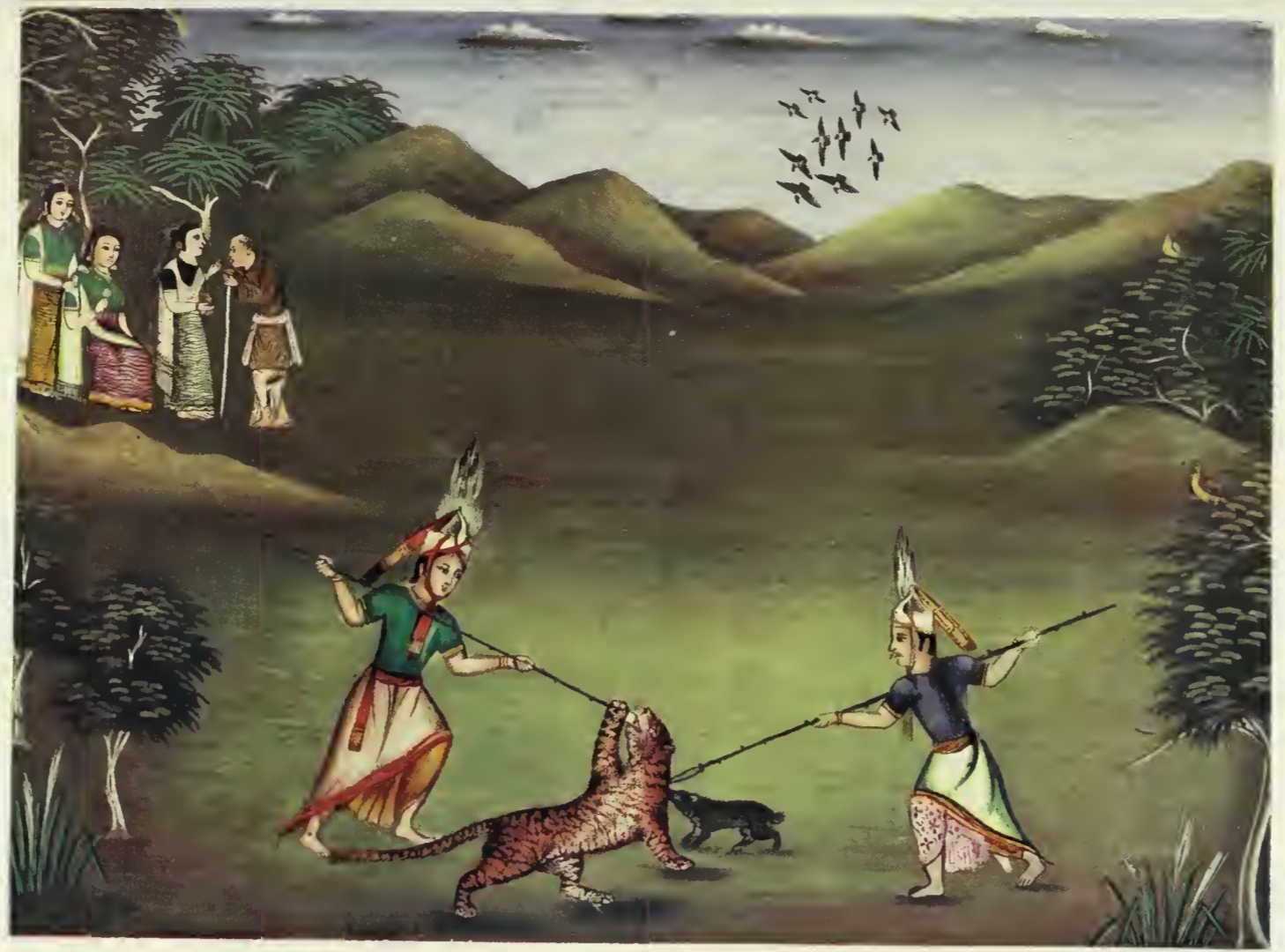
Khuman Khamba and his rival Nongban trying to hunt the Khoirentak tiger.

Tigers are among the most mentioned animals in different elements of Meitei culture.

=== Keibu Keioiba ===
In the Meitei mythology and folklore, Keibu Keioiba (Meitei: ꯀꯩꯕꯨ ꯀꯩꯑꯣꯏꯕ), also known as Kabui Keioiba (Meitei: ꯀꯕꯨꯏ ꯀꯩꯑꯣꯏꯕ), is a mythical creature with the head of a tiger and the body of a human. He is often described as half man and half tiger. He was once a skilful priest named Kabui Salang Maiba. With his witchcraft, he transfigured himself into the form of a ferocious tiger. As a punishment of his pride (divine retribution), he could not completely turn back to his original human form.

=== Khoirentak tiger ===
In the Meitei folktale of the Khamba and Thoibi, Khuman Khamba and Nongban were in conflict regarding the affairs of princess Moirang Thoibi. Both men wanted to marry the princess. Among the two suitors, the princess had already chosen Khamba but still Nongban did not give up easily. The matter was set before the King of ancient Moirang in his court, and he ordered them to settle the matter by the trial by ordeal of the spear. However, an old woman said that there was a tiger in the forest hardby that attacked the people. So, the King chose the tiger hunt to be the witness and the ordeal. Whoever among the two that killed the tiger will get the Princess Thoibi as his wife. On the next day, the King and his ministers gathered there in stages. Many people gathered at the spot, that it seemed like a white cloth spread on the ground. Then the two went inside the forest. Near a dead body of a freshly killed girl, the tiger was found. Nongban tried to spear the tiger but he missed his target. Then the tiger sprang upon them and bit Nongban. Khamba wounded the beast, and drove it off. Then he carried Nongban to the gallery. Then Khamba entered the forest once again and found the tiger crouching in a hollow half hidden by the forest, but in full view of the gallery of the King.

== Tortoises and turtles ==
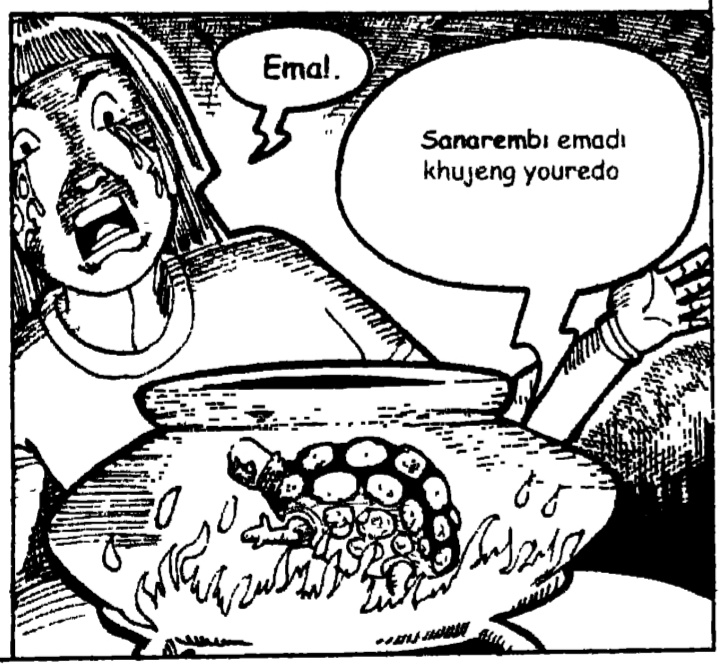
In the Meitei folktale of Sandrembi and Chaisra, Sandrembi's mother turned into a tortoise/turtle after her death and came back to her daughter but she again fell in troubles

=== Tortoise/turtle in the story of Sandrembi and Chaisra ===
In the Meitei folktale of Sandrembi and Chaisra, Sandrembi's mother transformed herself into a tortoise/turtle, after some time, she was killed by Sandrembi's stepmother, who was her cowife and rival. Upon being instructed in Sandrembi's dream, Sandrembi took the tortoise from the lake and kept it inside a pitcher for five consecutive days without any break. It was told to her that her mother could re-assume her human form from the tortoise form only if kept inside a pitcher for five consecutive days without any disturbance. However, before the completion of the five days, Chaisra discovered the tortoise and so, she insisted her mother to force Sandrembi to cook the tortoise meat for her. Poor Sandrembi was forced to boil her own mother in the tortoise form. Sandrembi tried to take away the fuel stick on hearing the tortoise mother's crying words of pain from the boiling pan/pot but she was forced to put the fuel in by her stepmother. Like this, Sandrembi could not save her tortoise mother from being killed.

== See also ==
- Hills and mountains in Meitei culture
- Plants in Meitei culture
- Birds in Meitei culture
