= Marjing Polo Complex =

Polo Complex in Imphal

- Ibudhou Marjing Polo Sports Complex
- Ibudhou Marjing Khubham (Note: It is also called "Ibudhou Marjing Khubam" or "Ebudhou Marjing Khubam" as "Ibudhou" is also spelled as "Ebudhou" and "Khubham" is also spelled as "Khubam".)
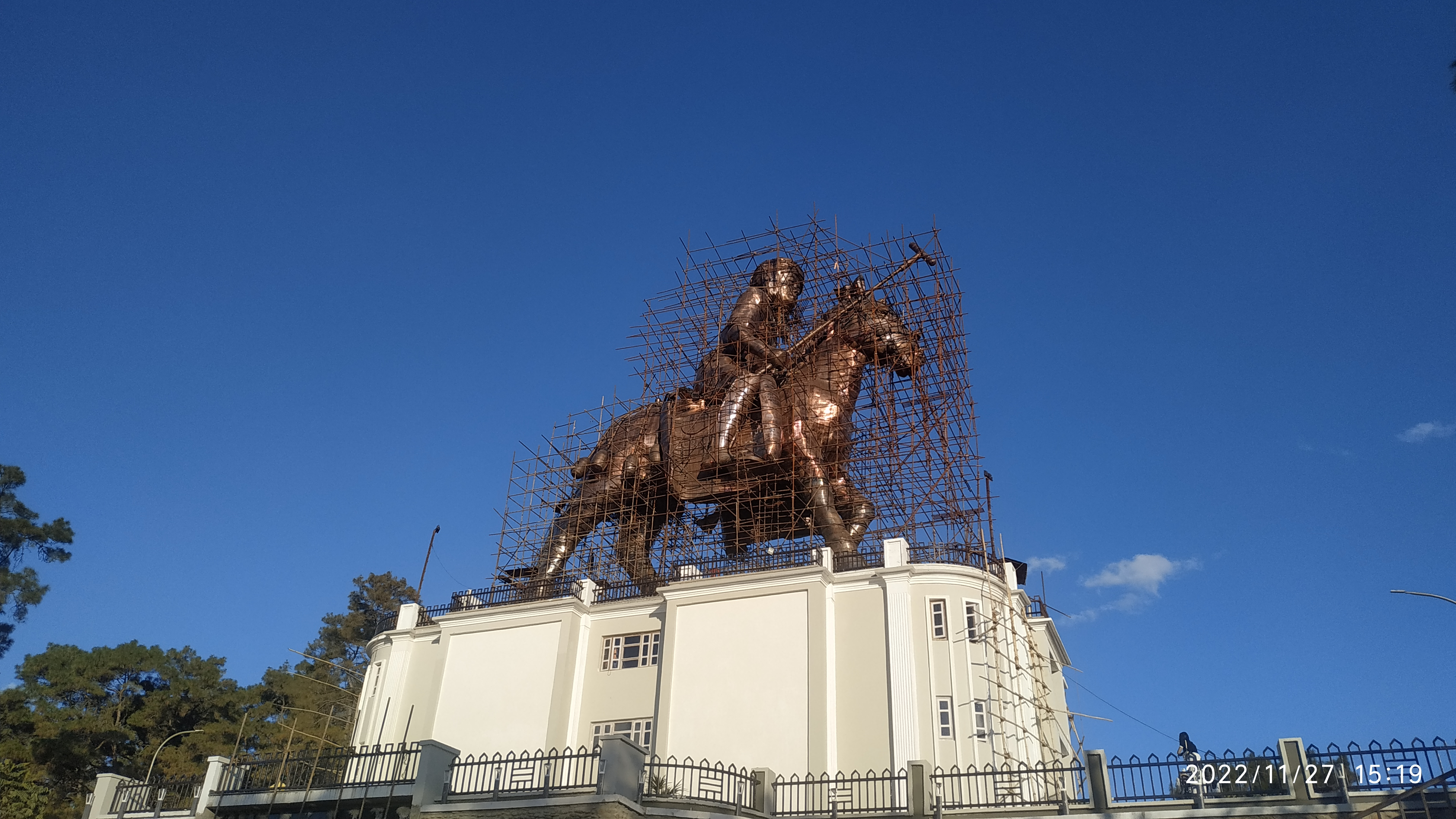
- The Marjing Polo Statue inside the Marjing Polo Complex in November, 2022
- Type: sports complex
- Location: Heingang Ching (Marjing Hills)
- Nearest city: Imphal
- Area: 23 acres
- Opened: 25 March 2018
- Founder: Government of Manipur
- Owner: Government of Manipur
- Status: open
- Budget: ₹263.19 lakh (equivalent to ₹6.6 crore or US$690,000 in 2023)

The Marjing Polo Complex (Meitei: Ibudhou Marjing Khubham) is a sports complex dedicated to ancient Meitei deity Marjing, Sagol Kangjei (Meitei for 'polo') and Meitei horse (Manipuri pony), built in the hilltop of the Heingang Ching, the sacred abode of God Marjing, located in Heingang, Imphal East district, Kangleipak (Meitei for 'Manipur'). It houses Marjing Polo Statue, the world's tallest equestrian statue of a polo player.

The total area of the Marjing Polo Complex is 23 acres, spreading over the Marjing hills (Meitei: Heingang Ching) with the grazing ground of the Meitei horses covering an area of about four acres.

== History ==
=== 2009–2018: Construction ===
The construction of the Marjing Polo Complex was undertaken with funding from the Ministry of Tourism, Government of India, under the Central Financial Assistance scheme initiated in 2009. According to the Chief Minister's Secretariat of the Government of Manipur, the total sanctioned amount for the project was ₹263.19 lakh (equivalent to ₹6.6 crore or US$690,000 in 2023).

Subsequent reports from 2018 estimated the cost of the project at approximately ₹123 lakh (equivalent to ₹1.6 crore or US$170,000 in 2023), indicating phased development or revised budgeting.

The project aimed to promote tourism and preserve Manipur’s cultural heritage associated with the indigenous game of Sagol Kangjei, regarded as an early form of modern polo.

=== 2018 onward: Inauguration and expansion ===
During March 2018, the Marjing Polo Complex was inaugurated by Nongthombam Biren, the then Chief Minister of Manipur, in the presence of Dr. Sapam Ranjan, the then Chairman of Tourism Corporation of Manipur Limited, L. Radhakishore, the then Chairman of Manipur Pollution Control Board, Kshetrimayum Biren, the then MLA of Lamlai, and other tourism officials.

On 5 October 2022, Manipur Chief Minister N Biren Singh inaugurated an open gym in the Marjing Polo Complex, under his "Martial Arts Akademi, Manipur", with the support of the Government of Manipur. Security guards are also made to be present to safeguard the gym.

In 2023, the construction of gateways to the Marjing Polo Complex at the cost of ₹2 crore (equivalent to ₹2.7 crore or US$280,000 in 2023) was announced in the PPP Model.

=== Events hosted ===
On 27 September 2018, the World Tourism Day was also organised in the Marjing Polo Complex, with the theme, "Tourism and Digital Transformation".

On 9 June 2019, a social group named "Manipur Updates" organised a tree plantation program at the Marjing Polo Complex, as a part of the "Mission Green Manipur" program.

In 2022, the Manipur Sangai Festival was organised at 14 different venues, including one at the Marjing Polo Complex.

In 2022, the National Tourism Day was celebrated in the Marjing Polo Complex on 25 January 2022. It was organised by the Directorate of Tourism, Government of Manipur. The Marjing Polo Complex was selected as the venue for the event because of its tourism prospects.

In 2022–23, the 6th Singju Festival 2022 was organised by the Singju Yokhatpa Lup Manipur in collaboration with the Ibudhou Marjing Khubam Kanba Lup Heingang at Marjing Polo Complex from 28 December 2022 to 8 January of the year 2023.

== Facilities ==
The Marjing Polo Complex provides care of the Meitei horses if the animal's owner doesn't have any facility to take care of their animals.

== Transport ==
- Marjing Polo Complex Ropeway: was completed in 2025 as part of nation-wide Parvatmala initiative, from the Langol Ching to the Marjing Hill and from the Marjing Hill to the Kangla Fort for the tourists.

== See also ==
- Daughters of the Polo God
- Hapta Kangjeibung
- Kangla
  - Kangla Nongpok Thong
  - Kangla Nongpok Torban
- Khuman Lampak Main Stadium
- Manipuri Pony (film)
- Manung Kangjeibung
- Mount Manipur Memorial
