= Manipur Statehood Day Women's Polo Tournament =

- Game: Sagol Kangjei (Polo)
- Founder: All Manipur Polo Association (AMPA)
- Countries: Argentina, Australia, Canada, Egypt, India, Kenya, United Kingdom, United States
- Headquarters: Imphal, Manipur
- Venue: Imphal Polo Ground (Meitei: Mapal Kangjeibung)
- Continents: Africa, Asia, Europe, Oceania, North America and South America

Manipur Statehood Day Women's Polo Tournament is an annual international women's polo tournament in Imphal, Manipur. It is organized in the Imphal Polo Ground (Meitei: Mapal Kangjeibung), the oldest pologround in the world. It is the first and the only international women's polo tournament ever organized in India. Manipur Statehood Day Women's Polo Tournament 2016 is the first event. The first tournament event marked the 60th Anniversary of the All Manipur Polo Association (AMPA). The polo association was established in 1955 by Ningthou Bodhachandra, His Highness, the then King of Manipur.

== Past Tournament Results ==
Year	Host	Winner	Score	Runners-up	Notes
2020 Details	India	United Kingdom	5-2	United States	
2019 Details	India	Argentina	3-1	United States	
2018 Details	India	Kenya	5-4	United States	
2017 Details	India	United States	9-3	United Kingdom	
2016 Details	India	India		United States	

== See also ==
- Daughters of the Polo God
- Women in India
