= Sagol kāngjei =

Traditional form of polo in Manipur

Sagol kangjei
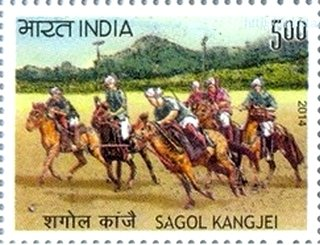
- The illustration of the traditional Meitei game of Sagol Kangjei in a postage stamp of India
- Nicknames: Game of Kings, Horse Hockey, Sakol Kangchei, Shakol Kangchei, Shagol Kangjei
- First played: c. 3100 BCE

Characteristics
- Mixed-sex: no
- Type: equestrian sport

Presence
- Country or region: Manipur, India
- Olympic: no
- World Championships: yes
- Paralympic: no
- World Games: no

Sagol kangjei (Meitei: ꯁꯒꯣꯜ ꯀꯥꯡꯖꯩ, romanized: sagol kāngjei, lit. 'horse hockey') (also sakol kangchei, shakol kangchei, shagol kangjei) is a traditional Meitei ball sport played on horseback with a long-handled stick. The sport, also known as Manipuri polo, is a predecessor of modern international polo.

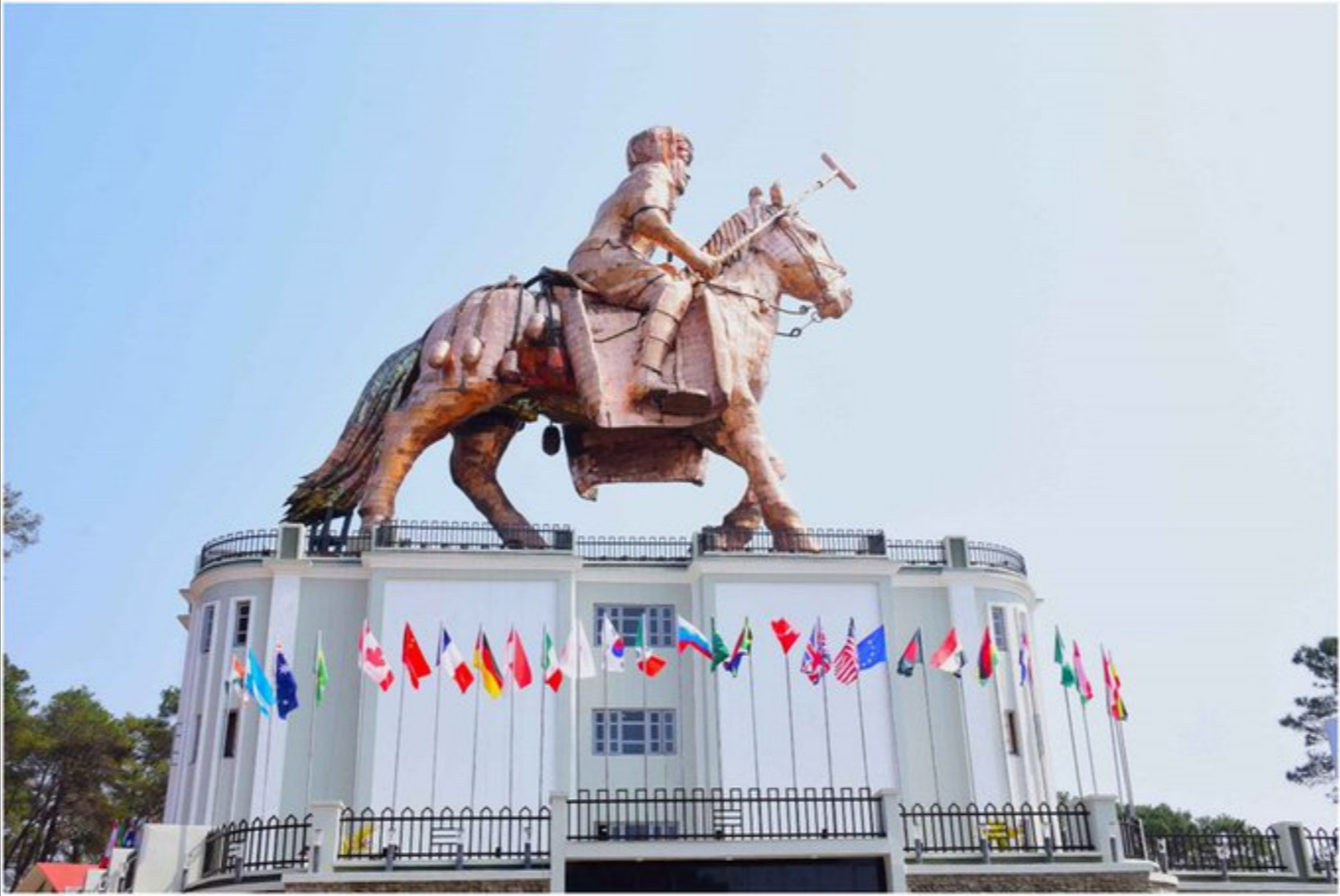
Marjing Polo Statue, the world's tallest statue of a polo player, dedicated to Meitei polo deity Marjing, built in the sport's birthplace, shown during the G20 summit.

== History and myth ==
Manipuri polo is one of the world's oldest sports, with some historians claiming it was first played c. 3100BCE in the ancient Meitei kingdom of Kangleipak. Sagol kāngjei is a traditional Meitei form of polo and the ancestor of the modern game. In Meitei mythology and folklore, sagol kāngjei was played by the gods led by Marjing and Thangjing.

In the Cheitharol Kumbaba, the Royal Chronicle of Kangleipak, sagol kāngjei was not only a sport, but used as an instrument of diplomacy, politics, and palace intrigue. According to the Kangjeirol (Meitei: ꯀꯥꯡꯖꯩꯔꯣꯜ), another ancient Meitei language text, polo was played during the reign of King Ningthou Kangba (1405-1397/1359 BCE) of Kangleipak. Kangba organized a polo matches to be played by his officials. During reign of King Khagemba (1597-1652 CE) sagol kāngjei was popularised and the rules were revised.

Sagol kāngjei was introduced to the British officers at Cachar, Assam by Sir Chandrakirti Singh, the then ruler of Manipur.

== Description ==
Sagol kāngjei is a form of polo, a ball game resembling hockey, played on a Manipuri pony (Meitei: ꯁꯒꯣꯜ, romanized: sagol), a traditional breed standing 11-13 hands, with a long-handled stick or mallet (ꯀꯥꯡꯖꯩ, kāngjei). The kāngjei is made of seasoned cane. It has a narrow angled wooden head, which is fixed at its striking end. The polo ball is solid, made of bamboo root and is generally 10cm in diameter.

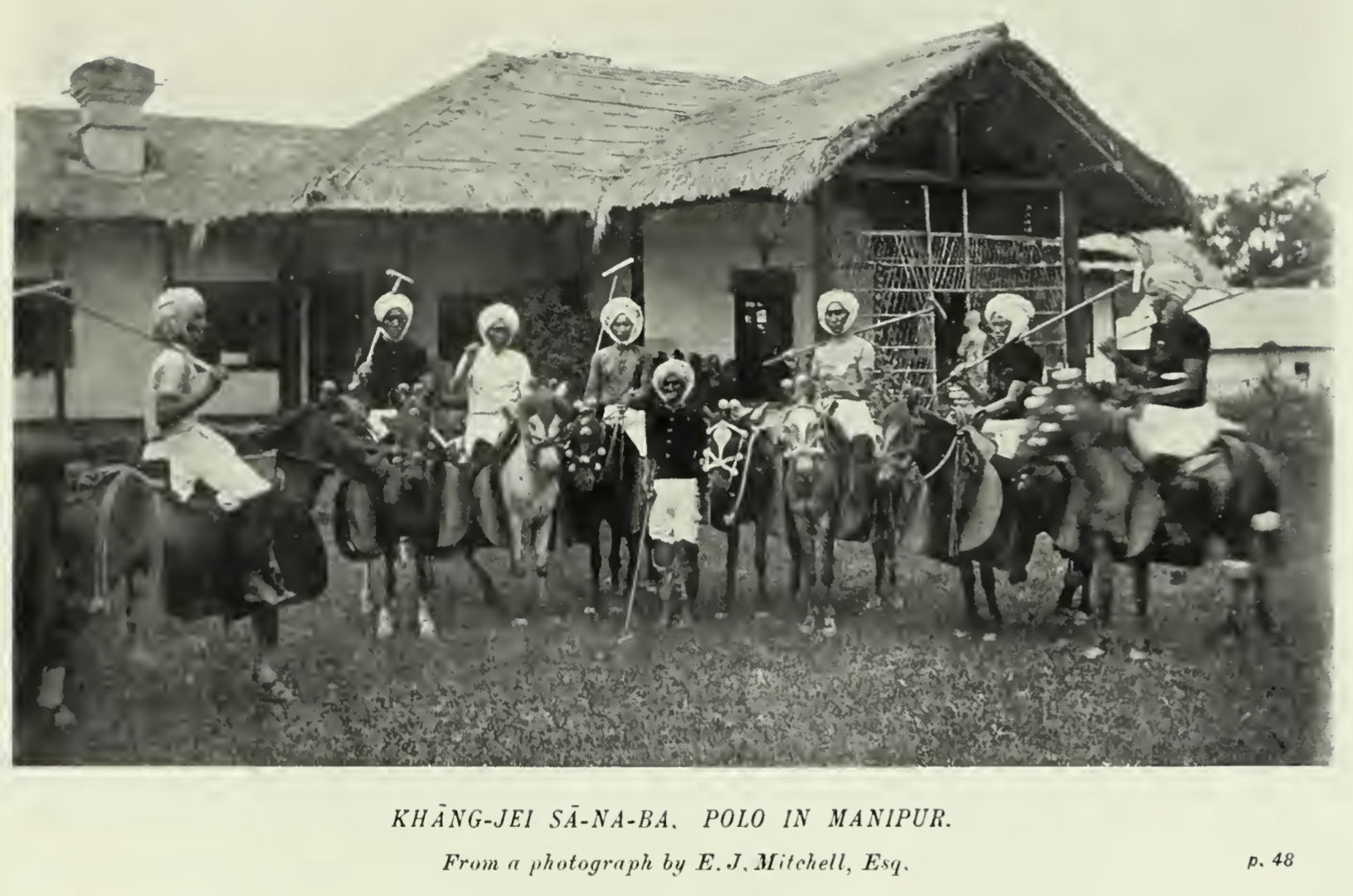
Sagol Kangjei – Polo in Manipur

The game is played between two teams of seven players, which are referred to as the northern team and the southern team. Both of the teams have seven players each. The playing field is usually rectangular in shape, around 210 yards (190 m) long and 100 yards (91 m) wide. Players may only strike the ball with their mallets. There are no goal posts. A goal is scored when the ball crosses the end line.

Sangol kāngjei is one of the three types of Meitei kāngjei (or hockey), with the other two types being foot hockey (ꯈꯣꯡ ꯀꯥꯡꯖꯩ, khong kāngjei) and hockey with wrestling (ꯃꯨꯛꯅꯥ ꯀꯥꯡꯖꯩ, muknā kāngjei).

== Uniforms and equipment ==
Players typically wear short-sleeved jackets in their team's colours and white dhotis tucked up above their knees. A traditional Manipuri turban, or kokyet, held by a khadangchet completes the look. Leg guards (khongyon) are used to protect the shins and the calves and more guards (khuning khang) protect the heels and the ankles, but the players' feet are bare.

Saddles are made of decorated leather, attached to a wooden frame called ukang khe. The stirrup has a flat base with a narrow foothold. A snaffle bit (chanam caru) is used.

== International competitions ==
Manipur International Polo attracts teams from nations including Argentina, Australia, Canada, Egypt, France, Germany, Haiti, India, Kenya, Mongolia, Morocco, Poland, South Africa, Thailand, United Kingdom, United States and Uruguay, competing with the team of players from Manipur.

The Manipur Statehood Day Women's Polo Tournament is the first and the only international women's polo tournament organized in India.

== Some important sites ==
Two of the world's oldest polo grounds are the Inner Polo Ground, located inside Kangla Fort in Imphal and the nearby Imphal Polo Ground. Historically, the Inner Polo Ground was reserved for Meitei royals and nobles.

The Marjing Polo Complex is a sports complex, dedicated to Marjing, the Meitei god of horses and polo. It was built in the hilltop of the Heingang Ching, the mythical abode of Marjing. It includes the Marjing Polo Statue, is the world's tallest statue of a mounted polo player. It was built to commemorate the Manipur as the birthplace of modern polo.

Also on Heingang Ching, there is a shrine dedicated to the god Marjing, where devotees, including polo players, offer prayers, and perform rites and rituals in his honor. Devotees offer polo mallets, balls, and replicas of polo ponies to the god, making the temple a storehouse of small, white horse figurines, red and white polo mallets, and pictures of horses.

== In popular culture ==
- Daughters of the Polo God
- Eigi Kona
- Manipuri Pony

== Gallery ==
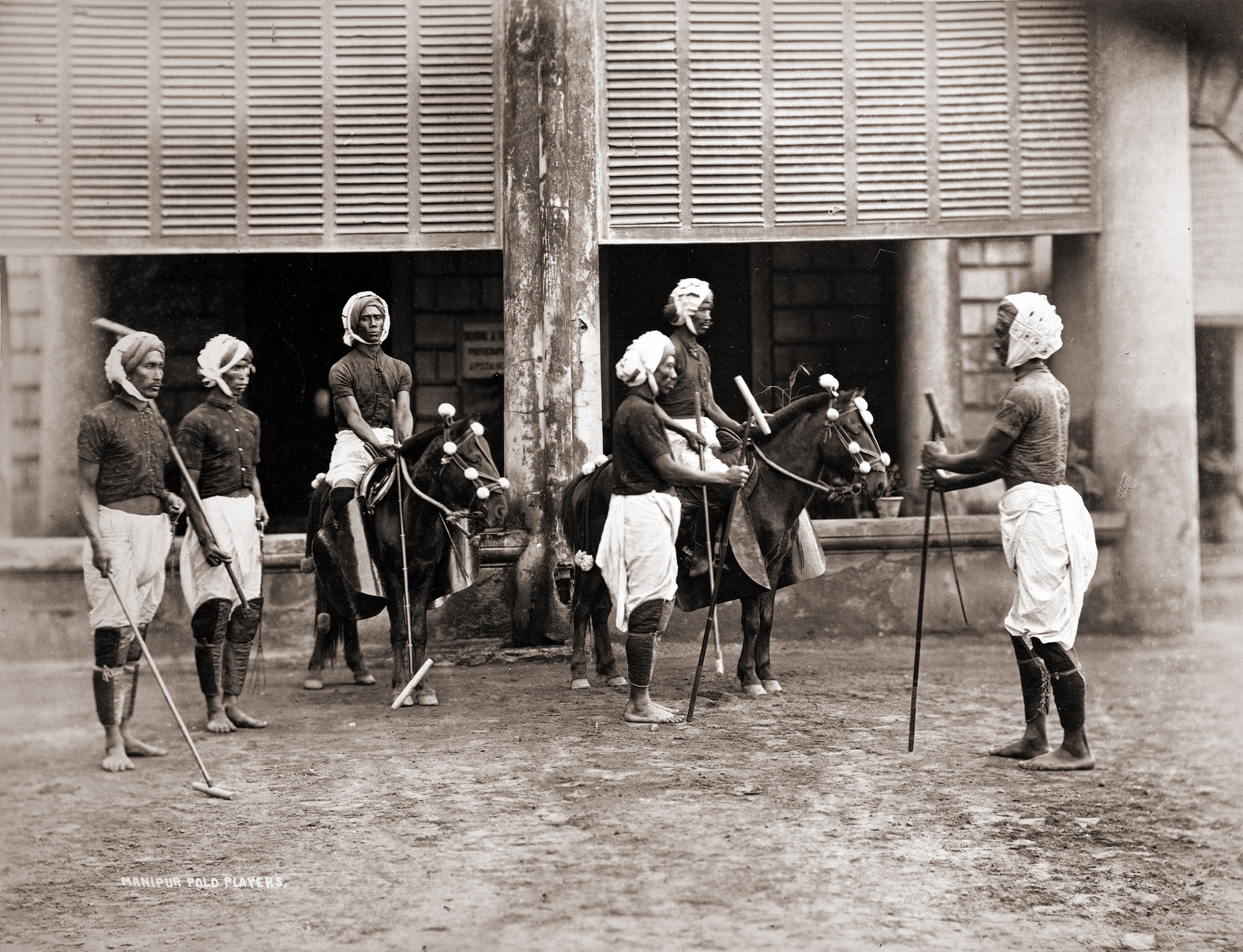
File:Manipur_Polo_Players_1875.jpg

File:Sagol_Kangjei_match.JPG

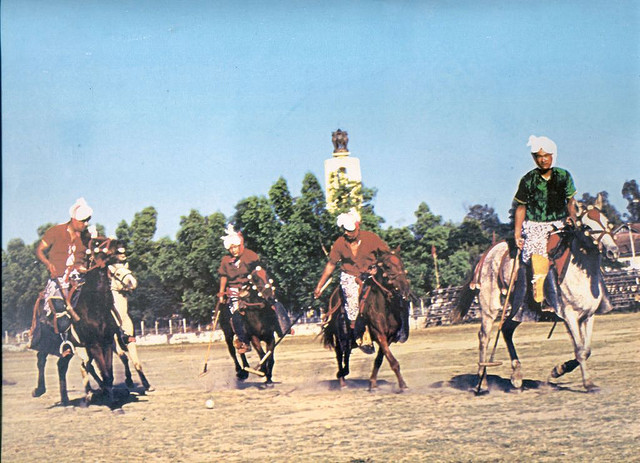
File:Traditional_Polo_in_Manipur_India.jpg

== See also ==
- Polo
- Dakyu
- Chovgan
- Buzkashi
- Jereed
