= Cassay =

Cassay may refer to:

- Cassay language: the Burmese/Shan term for Meitei language
- Cassay people: the Burmese/Shan term for Meitei people
- Cassay horse: the Burmese/Shan term for Manipuri pony
