= Heingang Ching =

Sacred hill in Imphal, Manipur, India

- Marjing Hill
- Location within India

Highest point
- Coordinates: 24.879°N 93.954°E

Naming
- Etymology: "Heingang Hill" or "Heingang Mountain"
- Native name: Heingang Ching (Meitei)
- English translation: "Heingang Hill" or "Heingang Mountain"
- Defining authority: Government of Manipur

Geography
- Location: Heingang, Imphal East district, Manipur
- Countries: Ancient Kangleipak (historical); India (present)
- State: Manipur
- Region: Heingang
- District: Imphal East district

The Heingang Ching (Meitei for 'Heingang Hill'), also known as the Meitei: Marjing Hill, is a hill in Heingang, Imphal East district of Kangleipak (Meitei for 'Manipur'). In Meitei mythology and religion (Sanamahism), Heingang Ching is a sacred mountain and the home of God Marjing, the ancient Meitei deity of Sagol Kangjei (Meitei for 'polo'), Khong Kangjei (Meitei for 'hockey'), and the Meitei horse (Manipuri pony).

Developed by the Government of Manipur, the Marjing Polo Statue is the world's tallest equestrian statue of a polo player. It stands inside the Marjing Polo Complex, on the hilltop of the Heingang Ching, which is historically, mythologically and religiously associated with the game of polo (Meitei: Sagol Kangjei). The statue was built to commemorate the game of "modern polo," which originated in Kangleipak (Meitei for 'Manipur').

== Marjing Polo Complex ==
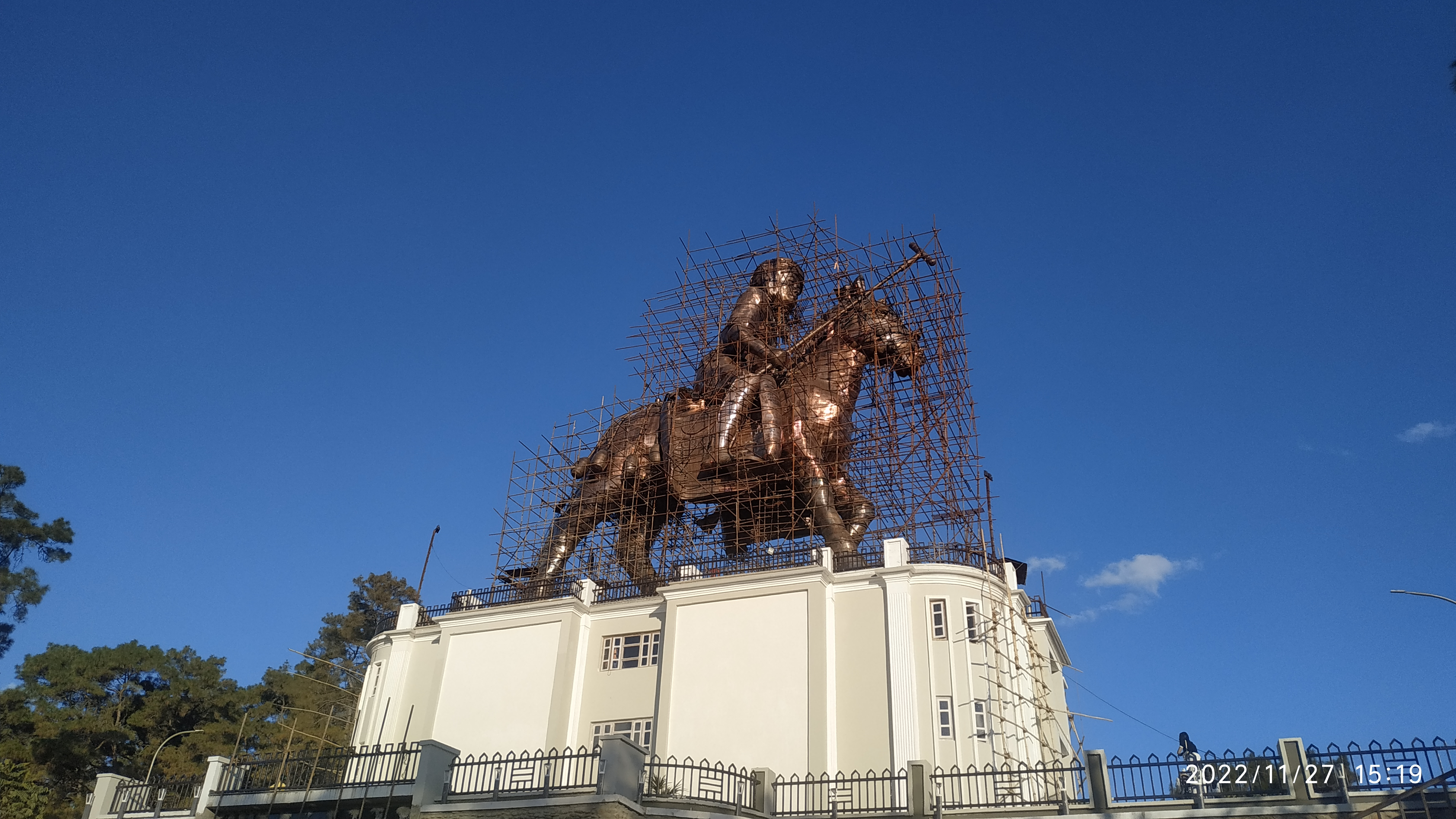
The Marjing Polo Statue inside the Marjing Polo Complex in November, 2022

The total area of the Marjing Polo Complex is 23 acres, spreading over the Marjing hills (Meitei: Heingang Ching) with the grazing ground of the Meitei horses covering an area of about four acres.

== Polo Ground ==
A Polo Ground is planned to be made in the hillock of the Heingang Ching (Marjing Hill).

== Transport ==
Cable cars are planned to be made available for public service from the Langol Ching to the Heingang Ching (Marjing Hill) and from the Heingang Ching (Marjing Hill) to the Kangla Fort, for tourists.

== See also ==
- Kangla
  - Kangla Nongpok Thong
  - Kangla Nongpok Torban
- Loktak Lake
- Manung Kangjeibung
- Mount Manipur
  - Mount Manipur Memorial
