= Marjing Polo Statue =

World's tallest polo player statue

- Marjing Sagol Kangjei Mitam
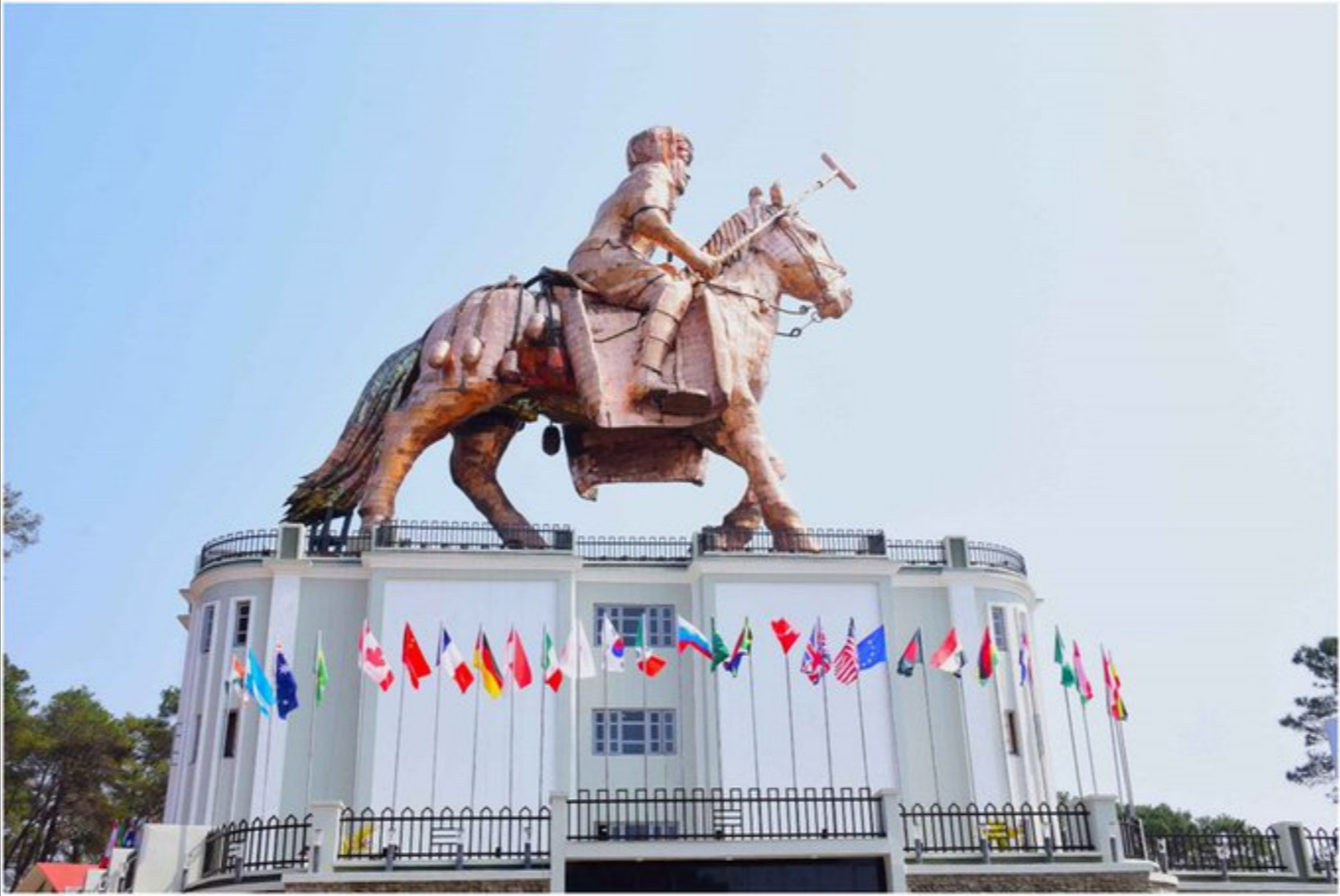
- Marjing Polo Statue, the world's tallest statue of a polo player, during the G20 summit, commemorating Meitei civilization, as the Cradle of "modern polo"
- Interactive map of Marjing Polo Statue
- Location: Marjing Polo Complex, Heingang Ching (Marjing hills), Heingang, Imphal East District, Manipur
- Coordinates: 24°52′46″N 93°57′15″E
- Designer: Professor Somnath Ghose of Jadavpur University
- Type: equestrian statue
- Material: steel (inner material) and bronze (outer material)
- Height: 122 feet (37 m) (Note: Many news websites mislead the height as "110 feet", "120 feet", etc.) (previously planned on "160 feet (49 m)")
- Beginning date: April 2016
- Completion date: November 2022
- Opening date: 6 January 2023
- Dedicated to: Marjing, Sagol Kangjei and Meitei horse (Manipuri pony)
- Inaugurated by: Amit Shah

The Marjing Polo Statue (Meitei: Marjing Sagol Kangjei Mitam) is a colossal classical equestrian statue of a player of Sagol Kangjei (Meitei for 'polo game'), riding a Meitei horse (Manipuri pony), constructed at the Marjing Polo Complex, the sacred sports site dedicated to God Marjing, the ancient Meitei deity of polo and horses, in Heingang, Imphal East District, Kangleipak (Meitei for 'Manipur'). It is the world's tallest statue of a polo player. It is built to commemorate the game of "modern polo" being originated from Kangleipak (Meitei for 'Manipur').

== Description ==
The Marjing Polo Statue is 122 feet (37 m) tall. The cost of construction of the statue is ₹39 crore (US$4.6 million).

The gigantic polo statue stands above a pedestal of a three-storey building, with recreational facilities.

The statue's inner structure is made of steel and its outer surface is covered by bronze. Its design is prepared by Professor Somnath Ghose of Jadavpur University.

Previously, during January–April 2016, the Government of Manipur planned to build the statue with a height of 160 feet (49 m) at the construction cost of ₹12 crore (equivalent to ₹17 crore or US$2.0 million in 2023).

Prior to the construction of the statue, a roadway was made up to the base of the place where the statue was to be built, for which permission was granted to the construction team by the Ministry of Environment and Forest.

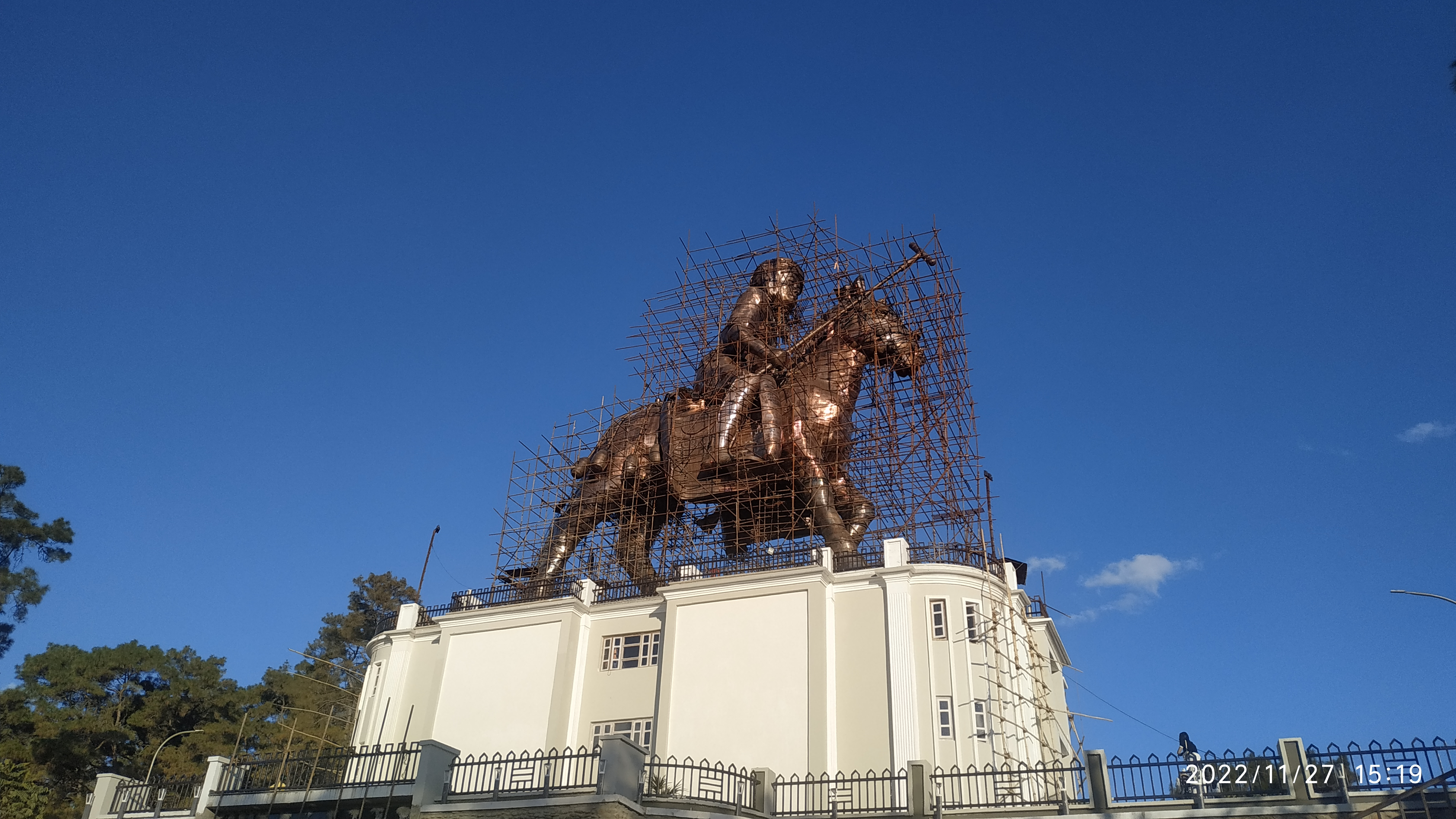
Marjing Polo Statue during construction

== Inauguration ==
On 6 January 2023, the Marjing Polo Statue was inaugurated by Amit Shah, the then Minister of Home Affairs of the Union Government of India, in the presence of Nongthombam Biren, the then Chief Minister of Manipur, at a function organised by the Department of Tourism, Government of Manipur.

Regarding the inauguration, Amit Shah stated:

"It is believed that Sagol Kangjei, the modern-day Polo game originated in Manipur. Today, inaugurated a 122 feet Marjing polo statue at the Marjing Polo Complex in Imphal. This will surely take the legacy forward and inspire more youngsters toward the game."

— Amit Shah, 06-01-2023

== Significance ==
Nongthombam Biren, the Chief Minister of Manipur, said that the 122 feet tall Marjing polo statue will "highlight the significance of the birthplace of Polo and revive the glory of Manipur". He also stressed the significance of the statue, being the tallest and the biggest polo statue, inaugurated in recognition of Sagol Kangjei, Sagol Lanmi (Meitei for 'cavalry'), Arambai, etc.

== See also ==
- Daughters of the Polo God
- Hapta Kangjeibung
- Manipuri Pony (film)
- Manung Kangjeibung
- Polo in India
