= Dakyu =

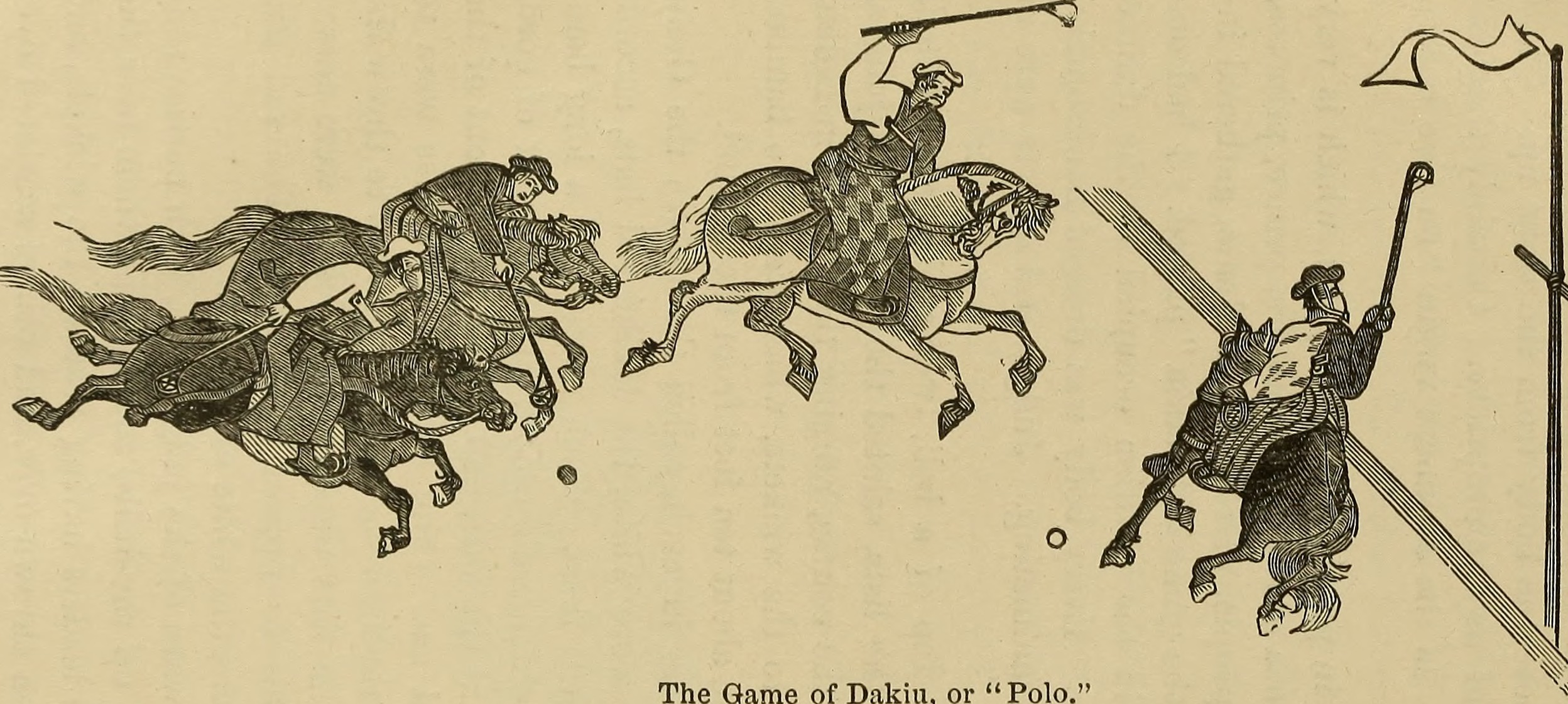
The game of dakyu in the 19th century in Japan

Dakyu (打毬,, da kyū; also, pinyin: dǎ qiú) is an equestrian sport in East Asia with some similarities to polo.

It also goes by the name of gyeokgu in Korea (Korean: 격구; Hanja: 擊毬; RR: gyeok gu; MR: kyŏk ku) since the Hanzi character 擊 (pinyin: jī) is transliterated as: gyeok Korean: 격; RR: gyeok or geki and carries the same meaning as the Chinese: 打, which translates as: to beat, to strike, or to hit. As one might expect, 毬 translates to ball.

== History ==
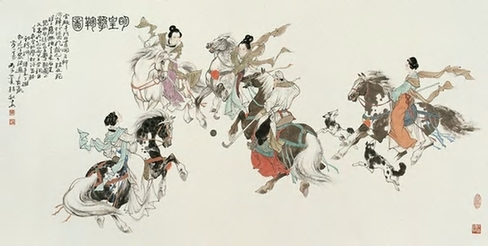
A dakyu game in progress in ancient China

Originally from China, dakyu was played in Japan as early as the Nara period, making its way there via the Korean Peninsula. It remained popular amongst the aristocracy until the Kamakura period, when it gradually died out (the last recorded game being in 986).

In the eighteenth century the game reappeared, largely due to support from Tokugawa Yoshimune. By this time it had evolved from a polo-like game (using mallets) to something more akin to mounted lacrosse. During this period, dakyu was considered a corollary to military training (working the skills needed to wield a spear from horseback). This aspect was downplayed in the Meiji era, when the game again lost favour; today, it survives only as a cultural asset.

== Gameplay ==
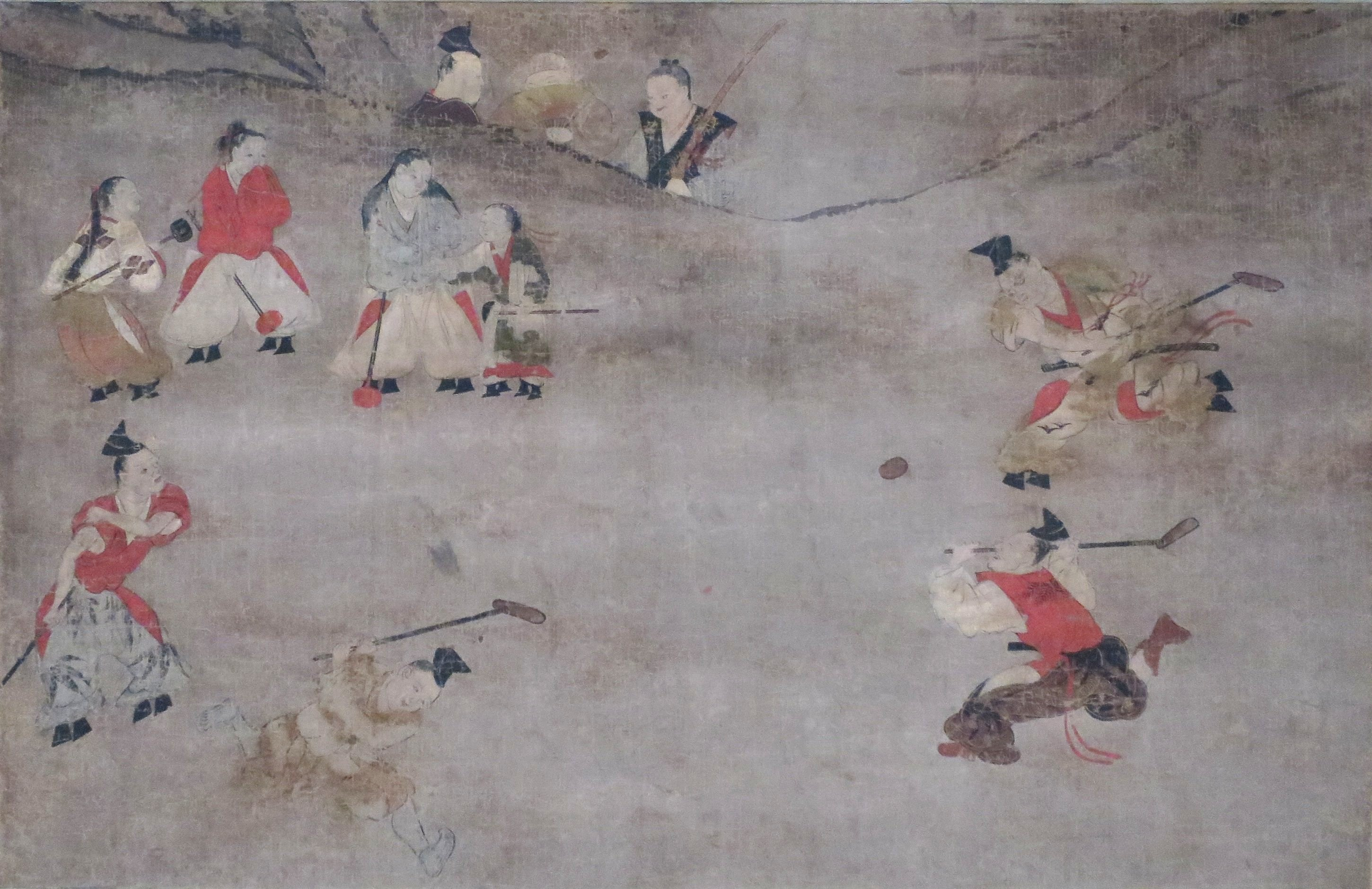
Dakyu on foot in the 16th century in Japan

Dakyu was played both on foot and on horseback, but the equestrian version was more popular among the aristocracy and was thus better documented. Rules vary, but two main forms survive to the present day. Both involve two teams of riders (designated by the colours red and white) attempting to project a number of balls into a goal. This goal, originally a hoop placed on the ground, is now more commonly a circular hole on a wall.

=== Kagamiryu style ===
In Kagamiryu or Hachinohe style play, which dates from the eighteenth century, the teams are made up of four riders each. The players race to propel the 30 cm diameter balls of their colour into the four raised goals (two for each side), shooting from a preset distance of between 18 and 27 metres from the goal. A successful goal is signalled by percussion; drums for the white team, gongs for the red. The winning team is the first to get all of their balls into the goals.

=== Yamagata style ===
In the Yamagata or Imperial style of play, shorter sticks (at only 1m, less than half the length of those used in the Hachinohe style) are used, and both teams shoot for a single goal. The ball is also smaller, being only a few centimetres in diameter. Five balls are used in Yamagata style games, and eleven in Imperial games. When one side has successfully got all of its balls into the goal, a final ball called the agemari is put into play - whichever team then scores with the agemari then wins the game. This aspect of play has drawn comparisons with the game of billiards.

== See also ==
- Polo
- Sagol kāngjei
- Chovgan
- Buzkashi
- Jereed
