= Manipur International Polo =

- Game: Sagol Kangjei (Polo)
- Founder: Manipur Horse Riding and Polo Association
- Countries: Argentina, Australia, Canada, Egypt, France, Germany, Haiti, India, Kenya, Mongolia, Morocco, Poland, South Africa, Thailand, United Kingdom, Uruguay, United States
- Headquarters: Imphal, Manipur
- Venue: Imphal Polo Ground (Meitei: Mapal Kangjeibung)
- Continents: Africa, Asia, Europe, Oceania, North America and South America

Manipur International Polo or Manipur Polo International is an annual international polo sports competition organised in Imphal, the capital city of Manipur. The main venue is Imphal Polo Ground (Meitei: Mapal Kangjeibung), the oldest pologround in the world. It is organized under the aegis of the Manipur Horse Riding and Polo Association (MHRPA) in the aim to popularize the game across India and the world. Several nations including Argentina, Australia, Canada, Egypt, France, Germany, Haiti, India, Kenya, Mongolia, Morocco, Poland, South Africa, Thailand, United Kingdom, Uruguay and United States participate in the championship competing with the team of players from Manipur. Notably, team for India is named "INDIA-A" team (represented by Indian Polo Association) and team for Manipur is named "INDIA-B" team (represented by MHRPA).
