= Mirra Bank =

American film director

Mirra Bank is a director of film, television, and theater. She is a member of the Documentary Branch of the Academy of Motion Pictures. Her documentary, “Last Dance,” was short-listed for an Academy Award. Variety called Bank's documentary, "The Only Real Game", about the popularity of baseball in war-torn Indian state of Manipur, a "clear-eyed snapshot of sports hope struggling against socioeconomic stagnation." Banks is a past President of New York Women in Film and Television and currently serves on their advisory board.

== See also ==
- Sports in Manipur#Baseball
