= Manipuri pony =

Breed of horse

Manipuri Pony
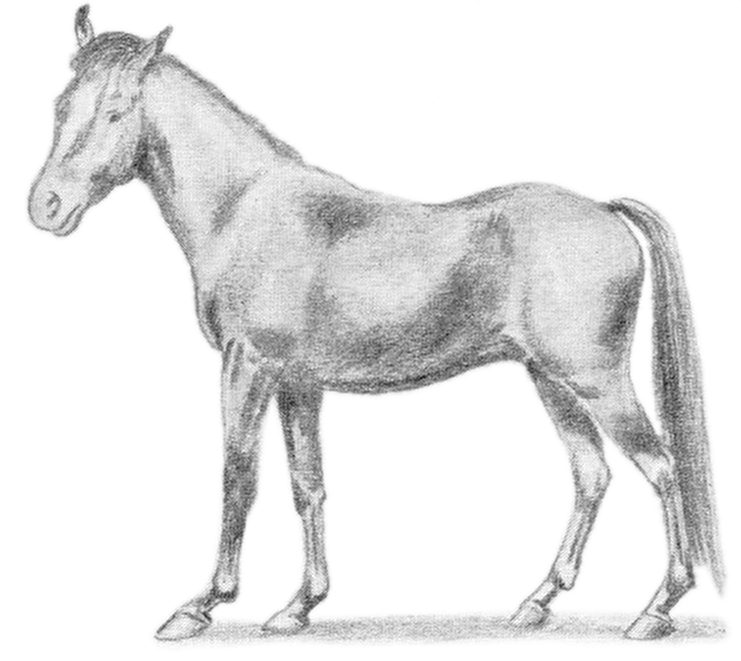
- Conservation status: FAO (2007): not at risk; DAD-IS (2020): unknown
- Other names: Manipur Pony; Meitei Sagol
- Country of origin: India
- Distribution: Assam; Manipur
- Standard: Indigenous Horse Society of India

Traits
- Height: usually 122–132 cm; up to 136 cm
- Colour: fourteen recognised colours

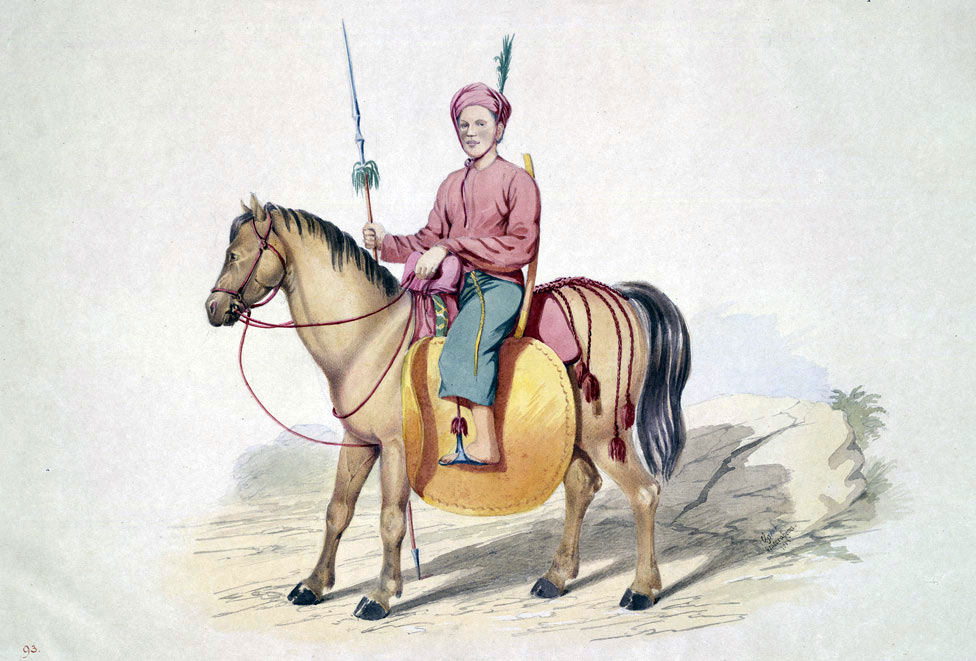
Manipuri horseman in an illustration from 1855

The Manipuri Pony (Meitei: Meitei Sagol) is a traditional Indian breed of small horse or pony from Assam and Manipur in north-eastern India. It appears both in the history and the mythology of Manipur, and was used for warfare and polo. It is believed to have been the polo pony in use in Assam in the mid-nineteenth century when British tea planters first saw polo being played, and the height limits set for polo ponies were based on ponies of this breed. It was very numerous in the early twentieth century, but numbers have since fallen. A breed society was established in 1977, and a breed standard was drawn up by the Indigenous Horse Society of India in 2009.

== History ==
Small horses have been bred for centuries in the Manipuri area of north-eastern India. They were often used as warhorses, and were ridden by the Meitei warriors of Kangleipak (later called Manipur). Horses from Manipur were used by the cavalry of Ningthou Gharib Nawaz (Meitei: Pamheiba) in his wars against the Konbaung dynasty of Burma. When the game of polo was first observed by British tea planters in Assam, these are believed to have been the polo ponies that were being used. Some unsuccessful attempts were made to cross-breed the Manipuri polo ponies with Arab stock. The height of polo ponies was based on the average height of the Manipuri, and was at first restricted to 132 cm (13 hands), later relaxed to 136 cm (13 h); in 1916 the restriction was completely removed. At about this time the export of ponies from Manipur was banned in order to allow breed numbers to recover. Manipuri horses were used to transport British troops into Burma during the Second World War.

In 1977 a breed society, the Manipur Horse Riding and Polo Association (MHRPA), was established. In recent years, breed numbers have decreased, and estimates place the breed at somewhere between 2300 and 1000 in population in the 21st century. Population numbers continue to dwindle in part due to high numbers of ponies being smuggled into Myanmar (Burma), where the breed is in demand, after either having been purchased or stolen from their Indian owners. In 2005, a heritage park was opened by the Manipur Horse Riding and Polo Association with the goal of preventing the extinction of the breed and promoting them to tourists.

== Characteristics ==
The Manipuri Pony has a light head with a straight profile, set on a well-formed neck, somewhat pronounced withers, a deep chest and sloping shoulders. The croup is sloping, the legs sturdy and the hooves well-proportioned. The overall appearance is elegant. Manipuri ponies generally stand 11 to 13 hands (44 to 52 inches, 112 to 132 cm) high. They are often bay in color, but can also be pinto, grey and chestnut. Because of the short height of the ponies, riders use shortened mallets while playing polo. The Manipuri pony resembles, and is distantly related to, the Burmese Pony and the Indonesian Batak and Sumba ponies.

In 2007, a study was published that examined genetic variation among five Indian equine breeds—the Manipuri, Marwari, Spiti, Bhutia, and Zanskari. Based on analysis of microsatellite DNA, the Manipuri was found to have the greatest genetic distance from the Marwari, and a much closer genetic distance to the other three breeds. The distance from the Marwari was not only genetic, but seen in physical characteristics, particularly height and environmental adaptability. The physical differences were attributed to differing ancestries: the Marwari horse is closely associated with the Arabian, while the four other breeds are thought to have descended at least in part from the Tibetan pony. None of the breeds in the study were found to be closely genetically associated with the Thoroughbred.

== Uses ==
Polo was introduced into the area of Manipur state as early as the seventh century, and Manipuri ponies were one of the first breeds used in the game. The British learned of polo during the nineteenth century while watching it played on Manipuri ponies in India. The breed is still used for polo today in India, but other breeds are more popular in Europe and America. Manipuri ponies are often also used to play sagol kangjei, a version of polo believed to be close to what was originally played when the sport was invented. Sagol kangjei is more demanding than modern polo, as ponies are used for the entire match instead of being changed between periods. Manipuri ponies are also used for racing. During their early history, they were in demand as cavalry horses, and men that rode these ponies were thought well-mounted.

== In popular culture ==
- Daughters of the Polo God
- Manipuri Pony (film)

== See also ==
- Heingang Ching
- Marjing
  - Marjing Polo Complex
  - Marjing Polo Statue
