= Yubi lakpi =

Traditional football game played in Manipur, India

Yubi lakpi (coconut football) is a seven-a-side traditional football game played in Manipur, India, using a coconut, which has some notable similarities to rugby. Despite these similarities, the name is not related to the game of rugby or Rugby School in England, it is in fact of Meitei-Pangal origin, and means literally "coconut snatching". Emma Levine, an English writer on little known Asian sports, speculates:

"Perhaps this was the root of modern rugby? Most Manipuris are quite adamant that the modern world 'stole' the idea from them and made it into rugby... this game, which has been around for centuries, is so similar to rugby, which evolved a great deal later, that it must be more than a coincidence."

However, traditional football games can be found in many parts of the world, e.g. marn grook in Australia, cuju in China and calcio Fiorentino in Italy and Levine provides no documentary or material evidence of its antiquity.

== Mythological and religious associations ==
The game is traditionally associated with autochthonous forms of Hinduism. It is said to have started as a ceremonial re-enactment of the celestial snatching of the pot of nectar after the Samundra Manthan. An official game is held on the occasion of the Yaoshang Festival of Shri Shri Govindajee at palace ground and with Royal presence.

Some games take place at the Bijoy Govinda Temple Ground.

== Laws and dress ==
Unlike rugby it is an individual sport, not a team one. Before the start of the game, players rub their bodies with mustard oil and water to make slippery to catch each other. A coconut properly soaked with oil is placed in front of the chief guest of the function, known as the "King", who does not take part in the game itself. Before the start the coconut is placed in front of the seat of the "King". Other features of the game include:

- Dress - players are generally barefoot, and wear shorts (a kisi/langot), but not shirts.
- Umpire - The umpire is a senior jatra, who starts the game, and stops fouls.
- Pitch - usually approximately 45 metres long, by eighteen wide, without grass. One side of the pitch forms the central portion of the goal line. It is frequently played on rough, dried mud. Alternatively it can be played on turf.
- Scoring - a player has to approach the goal from the front with his oiled coconut and pass the goal line. The coconut is later offered to the "King".
- Carrying - players are not allowed to hold the coconut against their chest, but have to carry it under their arm.
- Fouling and tackling - Players are not allowed to kick or punch opponents, or to tackle players who do not have the coconut.

Each side has 7 players in a field that is about 45 x 18 metres in area. One end of the field has a rectangular box 4.5 x 3 metres. One side of which forms the central portion of the goal line. To score a goal a player has to approach the goal from the front with his oiled coconut and pass the goal line. The coconut serves the purpose of a ball and is offered to the king or the judges who sit just beyond the goal line. However, in ancient times the teams were not equally matched but the players, with the coconut had to tackle all the rest of the players.

== Royal Associations ==
According to Levine, the game used to have martial associations, and tested prowess:

"The ultimate goal of yubi lakpi... is to present the coconut to the King, or the head of the tribe (as in the original game of buzkashi, where the goat was offered to the King after the match). In modern times, a 'King' is selected to receive the offering."
"For this reason, it is a game of individuals where each player is vying to win the coconut and get the reward. In the original games, the King would watch the players to see who was the most skilful, and possessed qualities for the battlefield (as with mukna kanjei [a Manipuri game similar to hockey] and polo) Each player therefore wishes to impress."

Nowadays the "King" (or "Chief Guest") is often a Sarpanch (village chief) teacher, or official.

== See also ==
- Lelo burti
- Medieval football
- Rugby union in India
- Rugby union in Bangladesh
