= Indian Country-bred =

Type of horse

- Country of origin: India

Traits
- Height: 127–137 cm

The Indian Country-bred is an Indian horse or pony type of indeterminate mixed breeding. It is archaically known as tattoo from a Hindi word. These horses vary from good-quality riding horses to small and poorly-conformed animals used for pack and draught work. They derive from many diverse horse breeds and types, both local and introduced from elsewhere. Among these are the small horses of the Himalayas of northern India, particularly Bhutan, Sikkim and Darjeeling, and the strong horses of the Punjab. Outside influences include Arab horses imported to Bombay and Veraval from the Persian Gulf, and the Australian Walers imported in very large numbers in the nineteenth century.

== Characteristics ==
The Indian Country-bred is very variable, but generally has a plain head, a long neck, a narrow chest, strong hooves and a low-set tail.
