= Daughters of the Polo God =

- A poster of the "Daughters of the Polo God"
- Directed by: Roopa Barua
- Based on: Women's empowerment and Saving endangered Meitei horse (Manipuri pony), together for the development of Polo (Meitei: Sagol Kangjei)
- Produced by: Roopa Barua
- Edited by: Hemanti Sarkar
- Music by: Sunayana Sarkar
- Release date: 2018
- Running time: 33 minutes
- Country: India
- Languages: Meiteilon (Manipuri) and English

Daughters of the Polo God is a 2018 Indian Meitei-English bilingual documentary film directed by Roopa Baruah and edited by Hemanti Sarkar. It is based on the story of girls and horses empowering each other. It is about saving the endangered Meitei horse (Manipuri pony) and empowering women in the sport of polo (Meitei: Sagol Kangjei) simultaneously.

The film is about Meitei women moving forward in the male-dominated sportive society of polo sports. It also shows the development of their special relationship with their Meitei horses (Manipuri ponies). They are always trying at their best levels to be able to participate in the annual polo tournament.

The film starts with Sagol Kangjei (Old Manipuri: Sakol Kangchei), the ancient form of form of polo as a wartime peace exercise in Antique Kangleipak (Ancient Manipur). It was a war game. That means the sport was placed during peacetime so warriors could practice their war skills. It ended up with the present day advancements of the Manipur Horse Riding and Polo Association. It creates a cultural, ecological, historical and social relationship between the sport, the horses, and the ethnic groups of humans who live in that part of the world.

== Background ==
The polo started in the far corner of the North East India (Ancient Manipur). It has been developed there for many centuries. At the same time, Women's empowerment has been very active in the history of Manipur. Roopa Barua, the maker of the "Daughters of the Polo God", took interest in these facts. So, she set her project on it. She said,

"A young polo sisterhood is developing in Manipur that ploughs on in spite of adversity and political turmoil. They are intensely connected to their sacred Manipuri pony and play an international tournament every year. My film is a tribute to these polo players, the modern Manipuri women and the pony campaign."

She spoke to the media that Meitei girls are empowered a lot and have been able to play and do well for themselves. Before the beginning of the journey, the polo girls offered prayers to Marjing, the "Polo God" of Meitei religion (Sanamahism), at his pantheon. And so, the name of the film is also taken from the sense that the polo player girls are the daughters of their beloved father like Polo God of their own ethnic religion. Notably, it took over four years to complete the making of the movie.

== Reception ==
The Equus Festival takes its winning films on a film tour across North American and European countries. The "Daughters of the Polo God" was also one of the winners. So, it was also shown in the different places. These are:

Venues	Month	Year
Baltimore Maryland	January	2019
Camden South Carolina	February	2019
Santa Fe New Mexico	March	2019
Meadville Pennsylvania	April	2019
Canada	September	2019
Scottsdale Arizona	September	2019

== Screenings ==
The film received official entries in many international film festivals organised across the world. These include:

Official entry	Seasons	Venues
Equus New York Film Festival	December 2018	New York
Rajasthan International Film Festival	January 2019	Jaipur, Rajasthan
Northeast Film Festival Pune (in collaboration with National Film Archive of India)	February 2019	Pune, Maharashtra
Asia's Women Film Festival	March 2019	New Delhi, India
UK Asian Film Festival	March 2019	United Kingdom
New York Indian Film Festival	May 2019	New York
South Asian Film Festival	2019	Vancouver
Tasveer South Asian Film Festival	2019	Seattle
South Asian Film Festival	2019	Montreal
Brahmaputra Film Festival	2019	India
DC South Asian Film Festival	2019	-
Indian Film Festival	2019	Houston
Mustard South Asian Film Festival	2019	Philadelphia
Busan International Animal Rights Film Festival	-	-

== Accolades ==
The film received 6 international awards at 5 International Film Festivals held at different countries of the world.

Awards	Category	Results
New York Indian Film Festival 2019	Best Documentary Short	Won
UK Asian Film Festival 2019	Best Documentary	Won
Vancouver South Asian Film Festival	Best Documentary	Won
Equus Festival New York 2018	Directors Award	Won
Equus Festival New York 2018	Best Documentary Short	Won
Rajasthan International Film Festival 2019	Women Empowerment Award	Won

== See also ==
- Imphal 1944
- Manipuri Pony (film)
- My Japanese Niece
