= Kangla Nongpok Torban =

Indian recreation area

- Imphal River Front
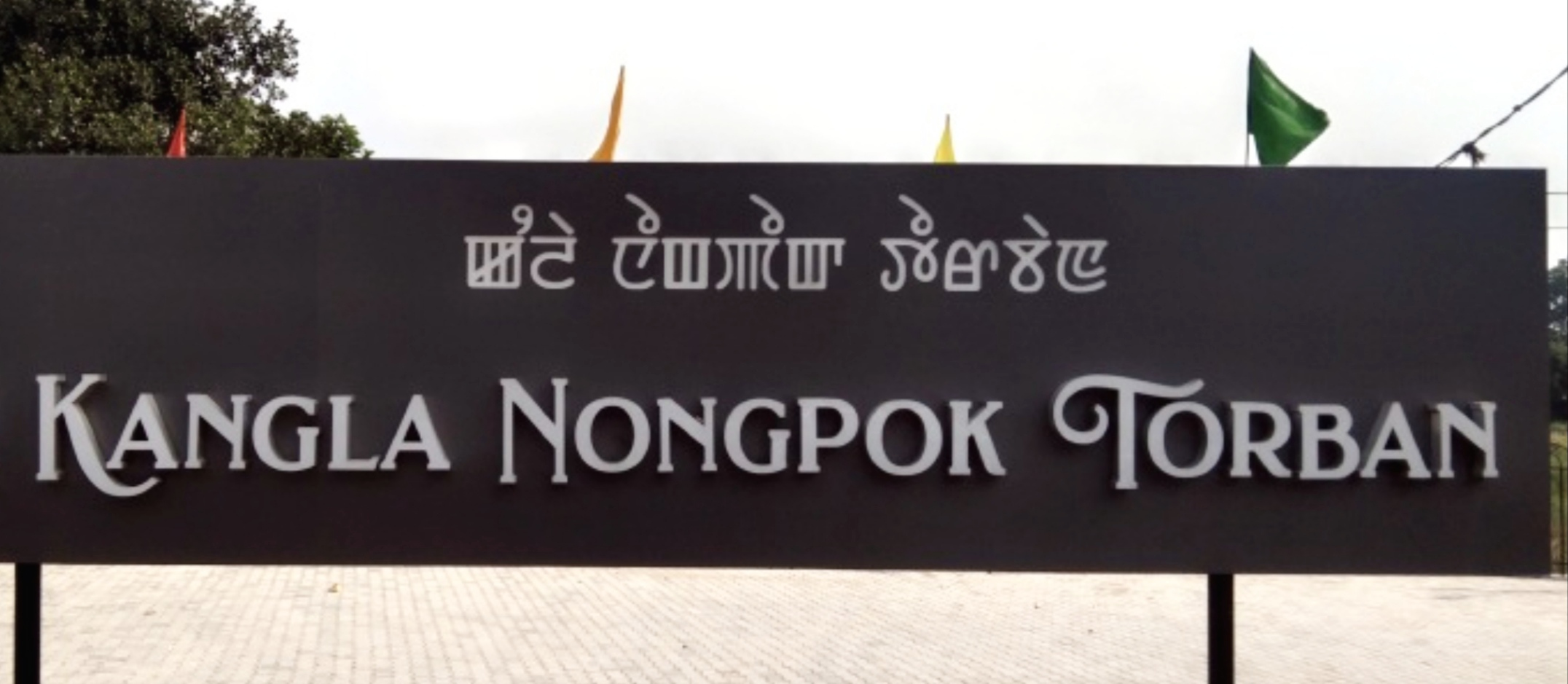
- A signboard at the Kangla Nongpok Torban, writing in Meitei (officially called Manipuri) and English
- Type: recreation area, riverfront
- Location: Imphal West district, Manipur
- Nearest city: Imphal
- Nearest town: Imphal
- Founder: Government of Manipur
- Owner: Government of Manipur
- Administrator: Government of Manipur
- Operator: Government of Manipur
- Open: 5 AM to 7 PM
- Water: Imphal River
- Facilities: open gym, walking track, cycling track, food plaza, kiosks, performance stage

Kangla Nongpok Torban or Eastern Bank of the Kangla is a riverside recreation area, on the eastern bank of the Imphal River in Imphal, Manipur, India. It was developed under the aegis of Imphal Smart City Limited. With the length of approximately 700 metres (2,300 ft), it covers its area from the Sanjenthong Bridge in the South to the Nongpok Thong (Meitei for 'eastern bridge') of Kangla Fort in the North.

== Opening hours ==
Kangla Nongpok Torban is open from 5AM to 7PM. The ticket counter closes at 6:30 PM, half an hour before the park closes.closed every Monday for maintenance. Early morning walkers are allowed to enter free of charge until 8AM. However, visitors are charged ₹20 (equivalent to ₹21 or 22¢ US in 2023) per person for entry to the area from after 8AM.

== Features and facilities ==
The Kangla Nongpok Torban includes an open gym, walking track, cycling track, exercise, food plaza, kiosks and a performance stage. 10 bicycles are available for visitors to hire by booking though a mobile app opened under the smart city project.

During September 2022, the Bio Clean Water Care Service OPC Private Limited installed four bio toilets in the Kangla Nongpok Torban under PPP model. Its service and maintenance are provided by the installing agency without taking any charges from the government.

The four toilets are meant for ladies, gents, handicapped and transgender people .

== Development ==
In the first phase of development work, stretching approximately 700 metres of area, the Kangla Nongpok Torban is fully developed starting from "Sanjenthong" to the "Nongpok Thong". In the second phase of development work, the Kangla Nongpok Torban is planned to be stretched further from "Nongpok Thong" to "Minuthong".

== Campaigns ==
On 25 June 2022, a campaign named "Green Imphal City Campaign" was organised under the theme "Planting towards Greener, Cleaner Imphal" by the Department of Municipal Administration, Housing and Urban Development (MAHUD) in the Kangla Nongpok Torban.

== See also ==
- Kangla Sanathong
- Statue of Meidingu Nara Singh
- Hijagang
- Iputhou Pakhangba Laishang
- Manung Kangjeibung
- Museums in Kangla
