= Khong kangjei =

Khong kangjei, also known as foot hockey, Manipuri hockey or hockey on foot, is a sport similar to field hockey primarily of the state of Manipur in India. It is a game which requires stamina, speed, and agility, and is one of the most popular games in Manipur. It is one of the indigenous sports of Manipur, others being sagol kanjei and kang, each of which reflects the martial tradition of Manipur, and with mukna captures an ethical code important to the culture of Manipur.

The name is derived from the Meitei terms khōng (foot), kāng (ball or round object), and jei, which is derived from the term chei (to hit).

After the Hiyang Tannaba, a type of traditional boat race held annually in Manipur, spectators adjourn to the hockey grounds, on which is played a match of foot hockey. Scoring for these matches "is carried on from year to year".

== Gameplay ==
A match is contested between two teams of seven players. The match is refereed by an umpire, who also signals change of sides (pun onba) and the end of the match. Each team has a leader, referred to as a panjenba, and play commences when the umpire throws a ball between them at the centre line.

A team attempts to score goals against the opponent, and the team first to attain a predetermined number of goals is declared the winner. Each player has one piece of equipment, a slightly curved bamboo stick about 4 feet (120 cm) in length similar to a hockey stick. It is used to strike a ball made of bamboo root of approximately 4 inches (10 cm) in diameter.

Each player is associated with an opposing player, and the two never leave each other during a match. Players may pick up the ball and run with it, a play often terminated by the player tossing the ball in the air and striking it. A player may also kick the ball, but must strike the ball with the stick to score a goal.

A player may obstruct an opponent; tripping opponents is permitted, and is known as a collar. A player carrying a ball may be physically challenged by an opponent, which requires the two players to wrestle (mukna), after which play resumes.
