= Manipuri Pony (film) =

- Poster
- Directed by: Aribam Syam Sharma
- Written by: Aribam Gautam
- Produced by: Films Division of India
- Cinematography: Irom Maipak
- Edited by: Oinam Gautam Singh
- Music by: Aribam Uttam Sharma
- Production company: Films Division of India
- Release date: 2013
- Running time: 52 minutes
- Country: India
- Languages: Meiteilon (Manipuri) & English

Manipuri Pony is a 2013 non-feature Manipuri film scripted by Aribam Gautam and directed by Aribam Syam Sharma. It is produced by Films Division of India. The film won the National Film Award for Best Exploration / Adventure Film (Including sports) at the 60th National Film Awards. The movie was also selected in the Indian Panorama of the 44th International Film Festival of India 2013 and the Mumbai International Film Festival in 2014.

Manipuri Pony was screened at the 8th Manipur State Film Festival 2013. The movie was certified by Central Board of Film Certification in 2012.

== Accolades ==
The winner of the National Film Award for Best Exploration / Adventure Film (Including sports) at the 60th National Film Awards, the citation reads, "For tracing and presenting the historical significance of the game of polo which has its origins in Manipur."

Award	Category	Winner's name	Result
60th National Film Awards	National Film Award for Best Exploration / Adventure Film (Including sports)	Producer: Films Division; Director: Aribam Syam Sharma	Won
8th Manipur State Film Festival 2013	Best Direction	Aribam Syam Sharma	Won
