= Pakhangba Temple, Bangladesh =

Pakhangba Temple
- ꯄꯥꯈꯪꯕ ꯂꯥꯏꯁꯪ
- A holy and sacred symbol for the traditional Meitei religion (Sanamahism)

Religion
- Prefecture: Sylhet Division
- Province: Sylhet Division
- Region: Sylhet Division
- Deity: Pakhangba
- Festival: Lai Haraoba
- Patron: Gambhir Singh

Location
- Location: Manipuri Rajbari, Lama Bazar, Sylhet Division
- State: Sylhet Division
- Country: Bangladesh
- Prefecture: Sylhet Division

Architecture
- Type: Meitei architecture
- Style: Meitei architecture
- Founder: Gambhir Singh
- Creator: Gambhir Singh
- Funded by: Gambhir Singh

The Temple of Pakhangba (ꯄꯥꯈꯪꯕ ꯂꯥꯏꯁꯪ) is a historic structure dedicated to Pakhangba, a Meitei deity. This Bangladeshi Meitei monument is located inside the Manipuri Rajbari of Lama Bazar. It is one of the cultural heritage of the Meitei people in Bangladesh. It can be divided vertically into three main sections: the pedestal, the sanctum cube, and the conical roof.

== Pedestal ==
The pedestal of the temple rises 58 centimeters above the platform. It is made of three courses of mouldings, which are divided into three sections: the sub-base, the base, and the shaft. Above the sub-base is the cube of the shaft, and above the shaft is the base moulding of the sanctum cube. The pedestal as a whole resembles a thick pillar. The ground plan of the pedestal measures 3.25 square meters.

== Sanctum cube ==
The sanctum is a single-celled hall with four walls that rise straight from the pedestal to meet the conical roof. Each corner of the walls has a pillar. The southern wall contains a lancet-arch opening serving as the entrance. Among the four walls, the southern and eastern walls are well decorated, while the northern and western walls have no decorations.

== Side walls ==
=== Southern side wall ===
The southern wall is the temple's main facade. The entrance is located at the center, flanked by two false doors. The upper portion of the main door features a lancet arch. All doors are framed by pilasters that replicate the design of the pillars and are decorated with various designs. Above the doors are three rectangular frames, with the middle frame being the largest. The frames are bordered with floral motifs and creepers. Above these frames, two peacocks are depicted, with a solar symbol placed between them.

=== Eastern side wall ===
The eastern wall is also richly decorated. It contains three false doors similar to those on the southern wall. Above these doors are three rectangular frames, with the central frame being the most important. This frame depicts the paphal of Pakhangba in a syncretised form, combining the paphal with the hood of Ananta, the Hindu mythical serpent king. Just below the hood and above the paphal is an indistinct carving. Two flower vases are placed on either side of the paphal. Additional carvings of floral motifs and creepers are positioned beside it. Above these carvings are depictions of two bulls and two horses, with a solar symbol in between. The northern and western walls of the sanctum are undecorated.

== Conical roof ==
The roof of the temple is conical and pointed at the top. It is constructed at an inclined angle of 75 degrees.

== See also ==
- Meitei architecture
- Pakhangba Temple, Kangla
- Pakhangba Temple, Uyal Cheirao Ching
- Pakhangba Cheng Hongba
