= Pakhangba Temple =

Pakhangba Temple may refer to these temples dedicated to Pakhangba:

- Pakhangba Temple, Bangladesh
- Pakhangba Temple, Kangla, Imphal, Manipur, India
- Pakhangba Temple, Uyal Cheirao Ching, Manipur, India
