= Kanglā shā =

Meitei dragon lion

- God of defense, guardianship and protection
- Member of Meitei dragons
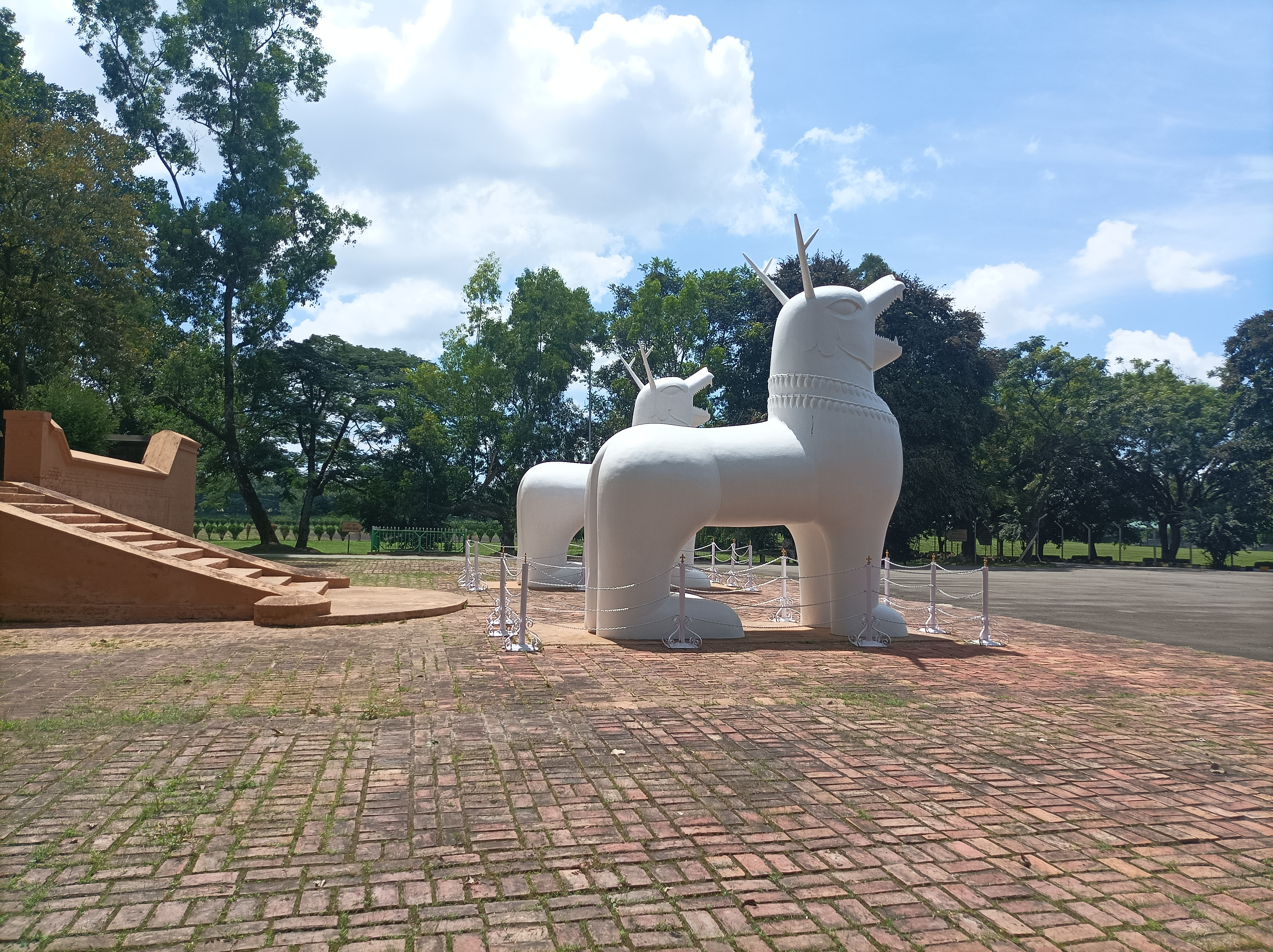
- Northern view of the Statues of kanglā shā, the, after the inside the Kangla Fort in Imphal, Manipur
- Other names: Kanglasha
- Affiliation: Sanamahism
- Major cult center: Kangla
- Abode: Kangla
- Region: Manipur
- Ethnic group: Meitei

In Meitei mythology and Sanamahism, the indigenous religion of Manipur, Kanglā shā (Meitei: ꯀꯡꯂꯥ ꯁꯥ, lit. 'beast of the Kangla') is a sacred guardian beast with a lion's body and a two-horned dragon's head. It is a royal symbol of the Meitei royalties (Ningthouja dynasty). The most remarkable statues dedicated to "Kangla Sa" stand inside the Kangla.

In Meitei traditional race competitions, winners of the race are declared only after symbolically touching the statue of the dragon "Kangla Sha".

== History ==
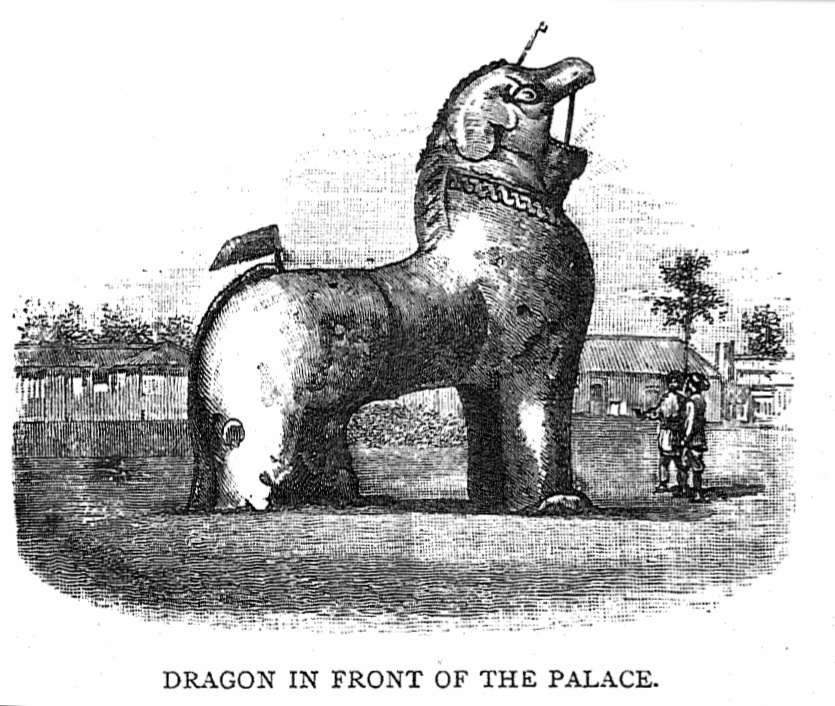
The artwork of the "Dragon in front of the Palace" published in the book "My Three Years in Manipur and Escape from the Recent Mutiny" written by Ethel St. Clair Grimwood in 1891

In the year 1804, Meitei king Chourjit Singh (Meitei: ꯅꯤꯡꯊꯧ ꯆꯧꯔꯖꯤꯠ ꯁꯤꯡꯍ)(1803-1813 AD) constructed two huge structures of the "Kangla Sha" dragon lions in front of the Kangla Uttra Shanglen (or simply called the "Uttra") inside the present day Kangla Fort. These two statues were demolished by the Burmese forces during the Chahi Taret Khuntakpa (Meitei for 'Seven Years Devastation') (1819–1826).

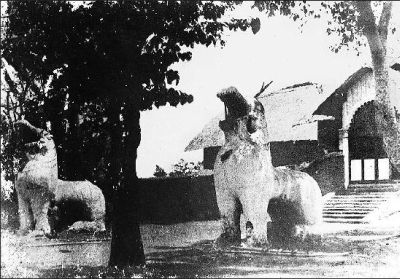
The pair of the statues dedicated to the "Kangla Sa" ("Kangla Sha") before their demolition by the British forces with their victory in the Anglo Manipur War of 1891.

During the months of June and July in the year 1844, Meitei king Raja Nara Singh (Meitei: ꯅꯤꯡꯊꯧ ꯅꯔꯁꯤꯡꯍ) reconstructed the two statues of the Kangla Sha dragons once again.

During the British conquest of the Anglo Manipur War of 1891, the British forces led by Captain Allen demolished the two statues of the Kangla Sha dragons by blasting them by artillery fire into pieces on 20 July 1891.

Later, in the year 2006, the statues of the "Kangla Sa" ("Kangla Sha") were reconstructed by the Government of Manipur. Each statue is 19.30 feet in height, 15.30 feet in length and 6 feet in breadth. The weight of each statue is 36.50 metric tonne. The statues of the Kangla-Sha were sculpted based on the photographs published in the books including "The Lost Kingdom" and "The Meitheis" written by Thomas Callan Hodson. 4 kinds of bricks, found in the ruins of the Old Palace at Canchipur, were used during the construction of the sculptures. It took the craftsmen and sculptors 2 years to complete the construction works.

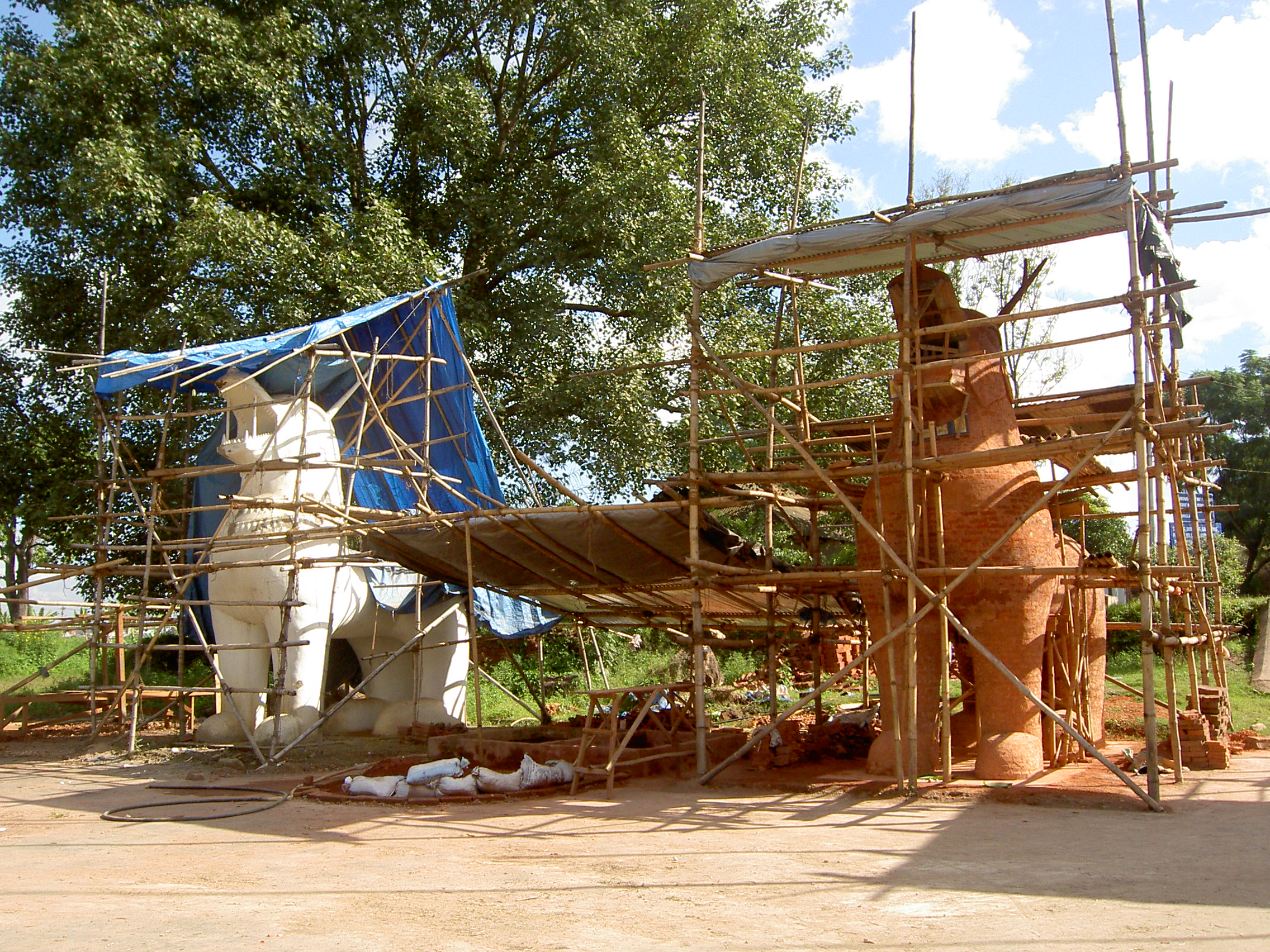
Mud prototypes of the Kangla Sha statues displayed in the public to take people's comments, feedbacks, opinions and suggestions before going ahead with the works on the construction and the installation of the same at the Kangla Uttra Shanglen.

Before the construction of the real sculptures, to take the comments, feedbacks, opinions and suggestions of the people, Sculptor B Mohendro Sharma presented the prototypes of the Kangla-Sha, made of mud, displayed on the public.

== Filming of the bombardment ==
On 9 December 2008, after getting permission from the Kangla Fort Board for shooting a film on the history of Kangla, associated with the demolition of the Kangla Sha statues in front of Kangla Uttra Shanglen, the "Manipur Film Development Corporation" (MFDC) Ltd. demolished the prototypes of Kangla Sha with the powerful crackers on 9 December, between 2 PM and 4 PM inside the Kangla.

== Removal of rods between jaws ==
On 18 June 2021, the "Kaba Khanba" (Meitei: ꯀꯕꯥ ꯈꯟꯕ, romanized: ka-bā khan-ba, lit. 'rods between jaws') of the Kangla Sha statues were removed by the Government of Manipur, along with the performances of religious rites and rituals by Amaibas (Meitei for 'priests') and Amaibis (Meitei for 'priestesses'), due to the perception by the authorities concerned that the rods gave pains to Kangla Sha, resulting in the downfall and unhappiness of the people of Manipur. It was done after a unanimous joint decision by the Kangla Board, the Sanamahi Temple Board, the Uttra Shanglen, women's organisations of the Ima Keithel (Meitei for 'Ima Market') and the general public of Manipur.

The action of the removal of rods taken up by the Government of Manipur led by Nongthombam Biren Singh, the Chief Minister of Manipur, and Leishemba Sanajaoba, the Rajya Sabha Member of Parliament, was given positive reactions by the "Lamlai Mapari Thougal Lup" and the "All India Kangla Pakhangba Temple Development Society".

However, this event of the removal of rods drew criticism by RK Nimai, a retired IAS officer, as

“The removal of kabak of the two kanglashas at Kangla which was shown in the local TV channels indicates the utter lack of knowledge of the so-called experts even in Meitei tradition.”

He wrote an article about its criticism in the Imphal Free Press. As a result, many social associations and organisations burnt newspaper copies of the Imphal Free Press.

In a neutral response to the criticism and its reactions, Ethno Heritage Council (HERICOUN) stated:

“The organisation (Imphal Free Press) is not an expert body on the issue at hand and as such it is not a party in the argument between the supporters and opposers of removing the support rods from the mouths of the twin Kanglasha.”

In reaction to the criticism, there was a strong objection by the "International Sanamahism Students' Association" (ISSA).

== Other iconography ==
On 17 July 2021, two statues dedicated to the "Kangla Sha", made of bricks, were installed by the 109 BN CRPF under the care of the IGP of Manipur and Nagaland sectors at the main entrance gate to the 109 BN Mongsangei, Imphal West district, Manipur. It was done to pay respect for the Meitei cultural traditions of Manipur. The two bifurcated horns in the heads of each statue, are derived from the Sangai (Meitei for 'brow-antlered deer' Cervus eldi eldi), the state animal of Manipur, unlike the East Asian and Southeast Asian leogryphs.

== Heraldry ==
The Emblem of Manipur

The government of Manipur recognised the illustration of Meitei mythical animal "Kangla Sha" as the state emblem in the year 1980.

== Namesakes ==
A music band named "Kanglasha" was organised in Imphal in 2007. Its lead singer is Tukun Chongtham, its lead guitarist is Mantosh Thokchom, its bassist is Sen Thokchom, its keyboard player is Surjit Kshetri and its drum player is Chingkhei Nongthonbam.

== See also ==
- Fu Dog
- Hiyang Hiren
- Lamassu
- Pakhangba
- Poubi Lai
- Taoroinai
