= Manipuri architecture =

Manipuri architecture may refer to:

- Meitei architecture, the architecture of the Meitei people, in association with traditional Meitei religion (Sanamahism)
- architecture of the Hindu temples in Manipur
- architectural designs for the buildings and structures in Manipur
- architectural designs for the monuments and memorials in Manipur
