= Lainingthou Sanamahi Temple Board =

Meitei temple administrative board in Imphal

Lainingthou Sanamahi Temple Board (LSTB)
- Lainingthou Sanamahi Laishang Lup
- Logo of the Lainingthou Sanamahi Temple Board, Imphal
- Abbreviation: LSTB
- Nickname: Sanamahi Temple Board
- Named after: Lainingthou Sanamahi
- Founded at: Haying Khongban Uphong Yumpham, Imphal East district
- Type: Temple Development Board, Nonprofit, NGO
- Legal status: active
- Headquarters: Imphal
- Origins: Sanamahi religion
- Region served: Manipur and Tripura
- Official language: Meitei language (officially called Manipuri language)
- President: Nongthombam Biren Singh (6 March 2021 – till present) (Note: The ruling Chief Minister of Manipur is accustomed to serve as the "president" of the Lainingthou Sanamahi Temple Board.)
- Vice President: Lourembam Rameshwor (6 March 2021 – till present)
- Executive Officer: Khaidem Hitler Singh (since 19 March 2013)
- Chairman: Langpoklakpam Jayantakumar Singh
- Affiliations: Sanamahi religion

The Lainingthou Sanamahi Temple Board (LSTB) is a temple development board of the Lainingthou Sanamahi Temple, Haying Khongban Uphong Yumpham, Imphal West district of Kangleipak (Meitei for 'Manipur'). It is dedicated not only to God Lainingthou Sanamahi and Goddess Leimarel Sidabi of Sanamahism, but also to the other ancient Meitei gods and goddesses of the traditional Meitei religion.

== Permissions ==
The Lainingthou Sanamahi Temple Board (LSTB) allowed the public to receive the clothes, brass and copper wares, which were offered to goddess Leimarel Sidabi and god Lainingthou Sanamahi, by making monetary offerings. The LSTB allowed the public to light their torches for Yaoshang from the complex of goddess Leimarel Sidabi and god Lainingthou Sanamahi in Haying Khongbal Uphong Yumpham.

== Academic activities ==
An academic meeting on the topic Sanamahi Laining Chatlaba Emung Amagi Thouramsingda Chatnagadaba Chatna Pathap (Meitei for 'Rules to be followed in a household which have embraced Sanamahi faith') was organised on 22 May 2022 at the office of the Lainingthou Sanamahi Temple Board (LSTB).

== Activities in the sacred month ==
Starting from 26 September 2022, which is the first day of the Meitei lunar month of "Mera", the Lainingthou Sanamahi Temple Board began to conduct a series of cultural activities for one whole month because "Mera" is a sacred month of the Meitei religion. Among the different events performed in the month, the following are included:

- The inauguration of the "Sanagi Ningshing Sagai", a photo gallery, which highlights the history of the establishment of the Sanamahi Temple in the holy site of "Heiying Khongban Uphong Yumpham" of Imphal West district.
- The cultural possession of the "Laining Khongchat" in the Kangla Fort.
- The performance of the "Thou Niba", a cultural dance and music event, and the "Meira Leirik Taba" event.
- The publishing of a book about Sanamahi religion, written in Meitei script.
- A 15-day academic workshop in collaboration with the Manipur University of Culture aiming to institutionalise the LSTB temple board for the Sanamahi religion.
- The oath taking ceremony of the representatives of the Piba Loisang and the Ningol Loishang of the LSTB.

In the year 2021, the Mera Hou Chongba, which is celebrated on the 15th day of the Meitei lunar month of "Mera", coincided on 20 October. It was celebrated by the Lainingthou Sanamahi Temple Board in which the ancient ritual of Pot Lannaba (Meitei for 'exchange of gifts') was observed.

In the year 2014, the Mera Hou Chongba, which is celebrated on the 15th day of the Meitei lunar month of "Mera", coincided on 18 October. It was celebrated by the Lainingthou Sanamahi Temple Board, organising gift exchange ceremony between the tribals (hill people) and the Meiteis (valley people) as per the "Ching-Tam Pot Lanaba" tradition, bringing peace and harmony between the different ethnic groups.

In the year 2013, the Mera Hou Chongba, which is celebrated on the 15th day of the Meitei lunar month of "Mera", coincided on 19 October. It was celebrated by the Lainingthou Sanamahi Temple Board in Haying Khongbal, Imphal.

== Possessions for goddess Imoinu ==
Starting from 1 January 2023 (equivalent to the 10th day of the Meitei lunar month of "Wakching"), 50 members of the Lainingthou Sanamahi Temple Board conducted a 3-day possession to spread messages and teachings of goddess Imoinu, specially focusing on the Yumballon (Meitei for 'Meitei homemaker's rituals and rules'), across the Manipur state. Notably, 3 January 2023 corresponds to the 12th day of the "Wakching" month, which is the day of Imoinu Iratpa. Starting from the Lainingthou Sanamahi Temple at Haying Khongban Uphong Yumpham in Imphal, the possession proceeded to 15 places which are Tangjeng, Chandon Pokpi, Chairel, Khullakpat, Chairel Mangjin Keithel, Napat (Pombikhok), Wangoo Ahallup Makha Leikai, Sandangkhong, Naodakhong, Thamnapokpi, Saiton, Torbung, and Phousakhai, where Imoinu Irat Thouram as well as cultural and traditional programmes were performed by the LSTB possession.

== Funding ==
The Government of Manipur, endorsing the Lainingthou Sanamahi Temple Board, is trying to designate a unique annual funding for the temple board, in the aim to bring development and conservation of the Sanamahi religion. The information was announced by the vice president of the temple board, Lourembam Rameshwor, who is also serving as the chairperson of the State Planning and Development Authorities of the Manipur Government, on the closing ceremony of a 15-day workshop on "Rite-De-Passage" of Sanamahism (Meitei: Sanamahi Lingning gi Pokpa, Luhongba amasung Korou Nonggabgi Thouramsing), organized in the shrine of the Lainingthou Sanamahi Sanglen, Haying Khongban, Imphal West.

== See also ==
- Nikhil Manipuri Mahasabha (NMM)
- International Sanamahism Students' Association (ISSA)
- Heingang Ching
  - Marjing
    - Marjing Polo Complex
    - Marjing Polo Statue
- Kangla
  - Pakhangba Temple, Kangla
  - Kangla Nongpok Thong
  - Kangla Nongpok Torban
- Nongmaiching Ching
  - Nongmaiching Reserved Forest
  - Sanamahi Kiyong
