= Nongshā =

Nongsha (Meitei: Nongshā IPA: /nong-shā/) may refer to:

- Kanglā Shā (Kangla Sha), the guardian dragon lion guarding the Kangla Palace
- Lion, a species of mammals
- Nongshāba, a son of the supreme deity in Sanamahism.
