= Paphal =

Traditional Meitei artwork

A Paphal illustration in the flag of Manipur Kingdom

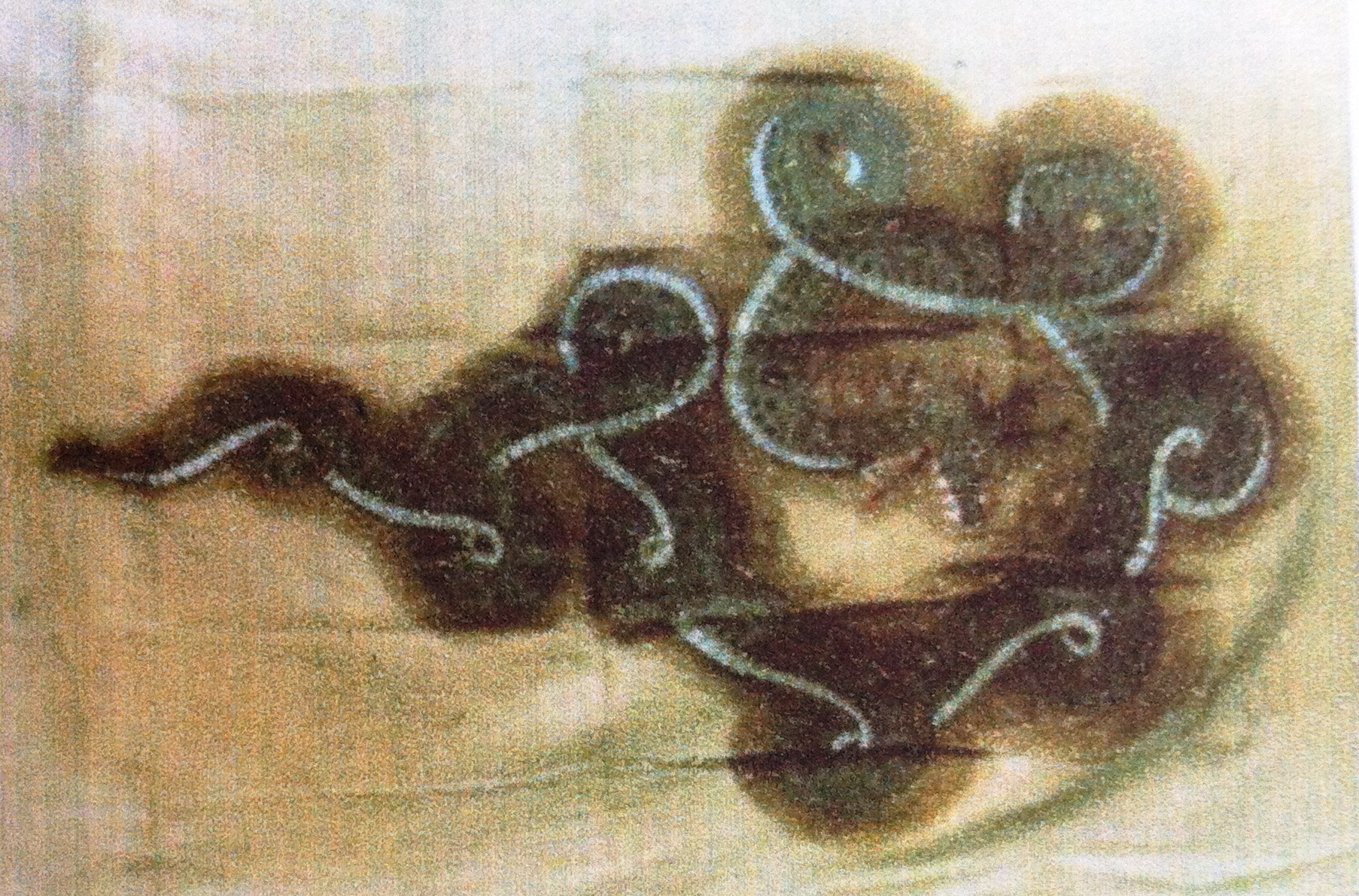
An illustration of a paphal in the flag of Manipur Kingdom

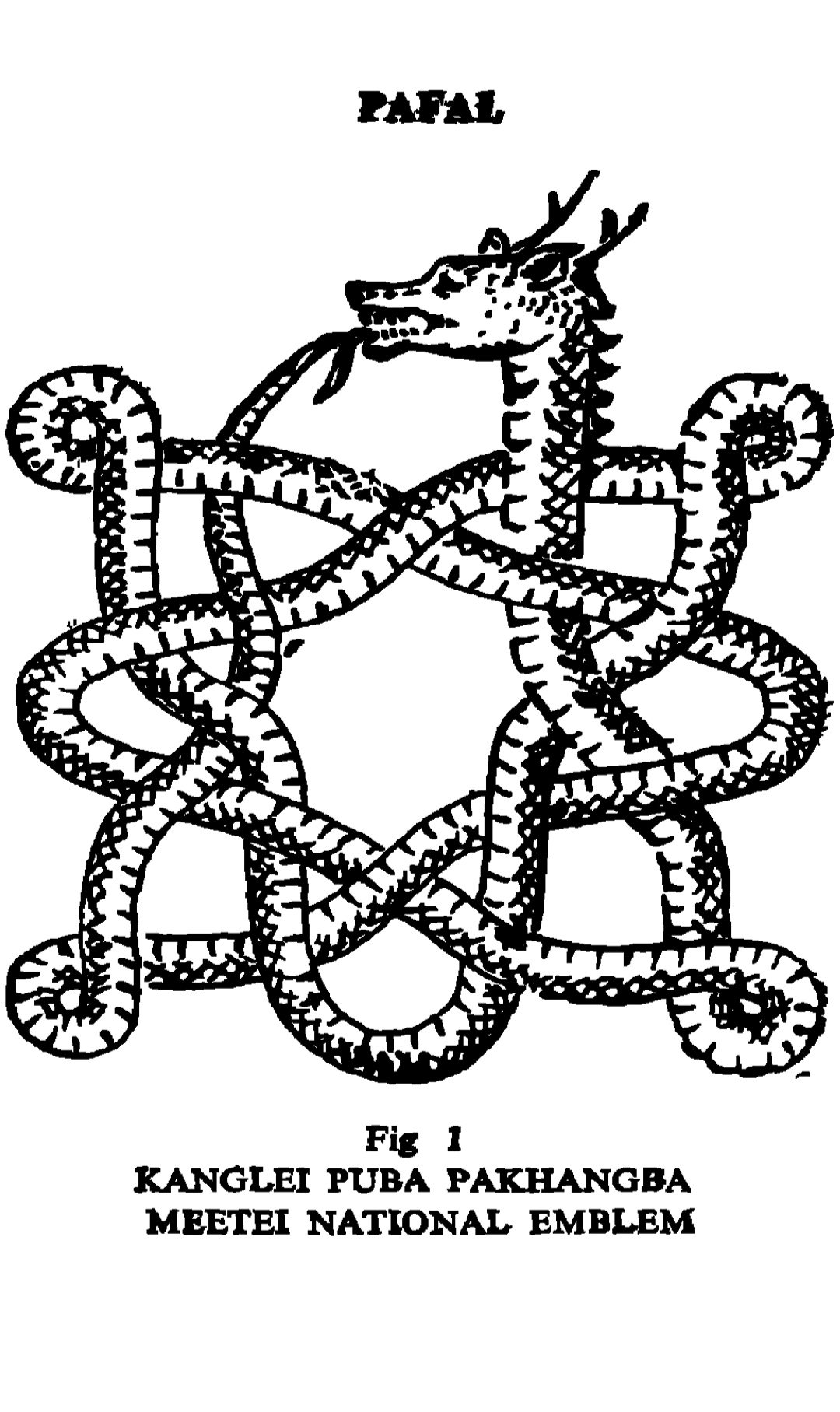
A Paphal illustration

A Paphal, also spelled as Pafal (Meitei: ꯄꯥꯐꯜ), or Paphan or Pafan (Meitei: ꯄꯥꯐꯟ), is a Meitei traditional symbolic representation, resembling pythons, (Note: specifically about the Meitei deity Pakhangba) varying in shape and color. These illustrations are closely linked to Meitei cosmology, mythology, clan identity, and ritual practices of traditional Meitei religion (Sanamahism) of Manipur. Notably, the Paphal Lambuba (Meitei: ꯄꯥꯐꯜ ꯂꯝꯕꯨꯕ), a traditional illustrated manuscript, contains depictions of 364 Paphals.

The Paphal cult holds a significant place in the religious and cultural framework of the Meitei community. Its influence is evident across various aspects of Meitei life, including visual arts, architecture, pottery, martial practices, and performing arts. The presence of Paphal imagery and symbolism in these domains reflects the integration of the cult into the collective consciousness and traditional expressions of the community.

== Clan color codes ==
The Meitei society is traditionally divided into seven clans (yek-salai), each associated with a specific color. These color codes are reflected in the Paphal illustrations corresponding to each clan.

== Symbolism and beliefs ==
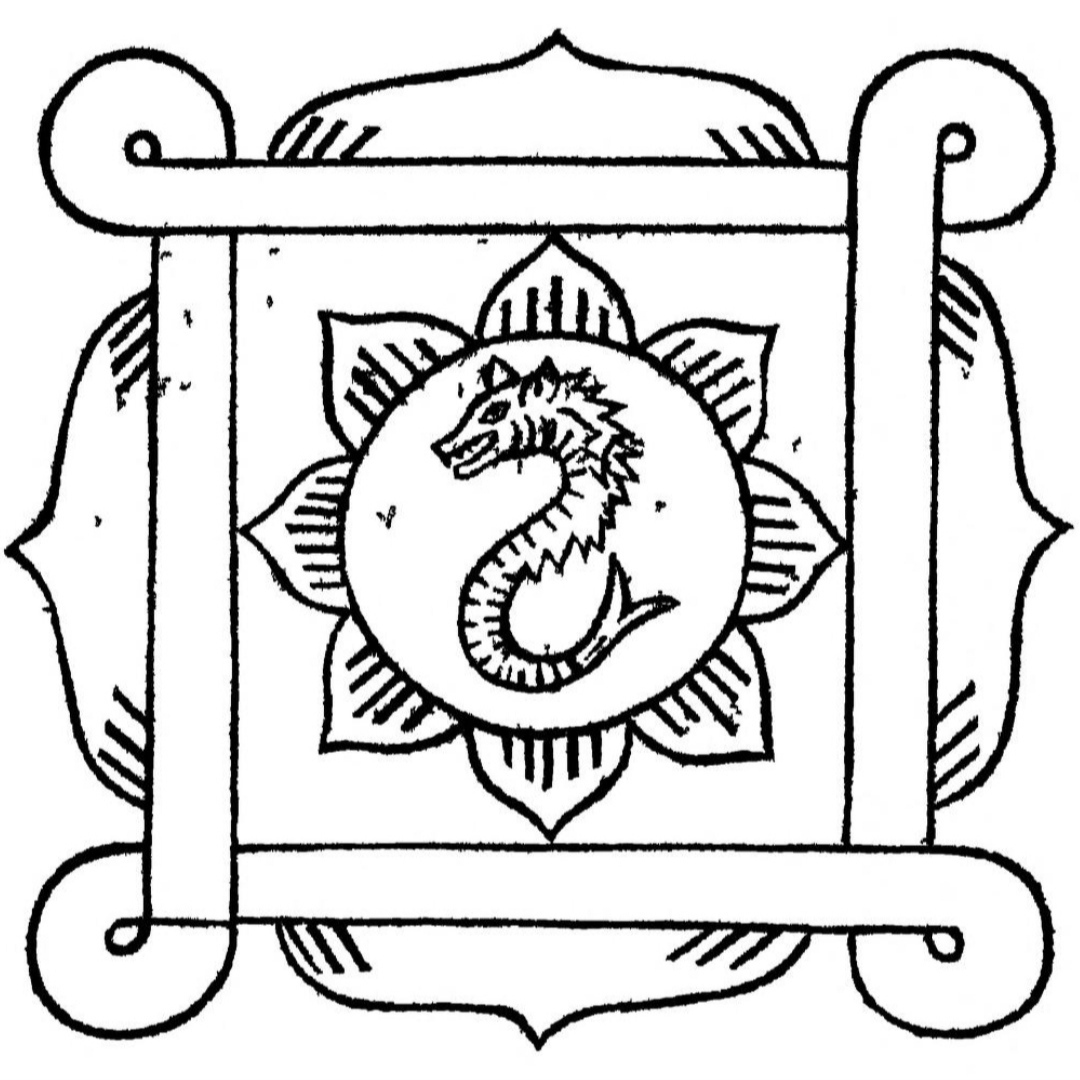
A Paphal illustration in an Iratphu

Paphals are believed to possess supernatural powers. They frequently incorporate mystic symbols, Meitei alphabets, and sacred hymns within and around the figure. In the past, Paphal drawings were placed above the main entrance of homes to ward off evil spirits.

The typical Paphal shows a python biting its own tail, symbolizing the cyclical nature of life, the unity of creation and creator, and universal harmony. The intertwined body is interpreted as representing the union of male and female as sources of life.

== Types of Paphal ==
Paphals are broadly categorized into three types:

1. Tail-Biting Python: Represents serenity and cosmic order.

2. Non-Tail-Biting Python: Conveys fear, aggression, or disturbance.

3. Other Belly-Crawling Creatures: Depict animals like lizards; traditional texts such as Ningthou fi Saba suggest that all belly-crawling creatures were once considered types of pythons.

== Subtypes by head position ==
The position of the python's head creates three subtypes:

- Upper Position: Signifies high intellectual achievement.
- Middle Position: Indicates calmness and self-control.
- Bent Backward: Suggests adaptability and the ability to function in both spiritual and worldly realms.

== Cultural practices ==
In traditional Meitei martial arts, specific Paphal patterns guide body movements with spears, depending on whether the action is offensive or defensive. During the Lai Haraoba festival, ritual leaders including maiba (priests), maibi (priestesses), and pena sakpa (musicians) lead a dance mimicking the curves of the Paphal to invoke prosperity and well-being for the community and future generations.

== Gallery ==
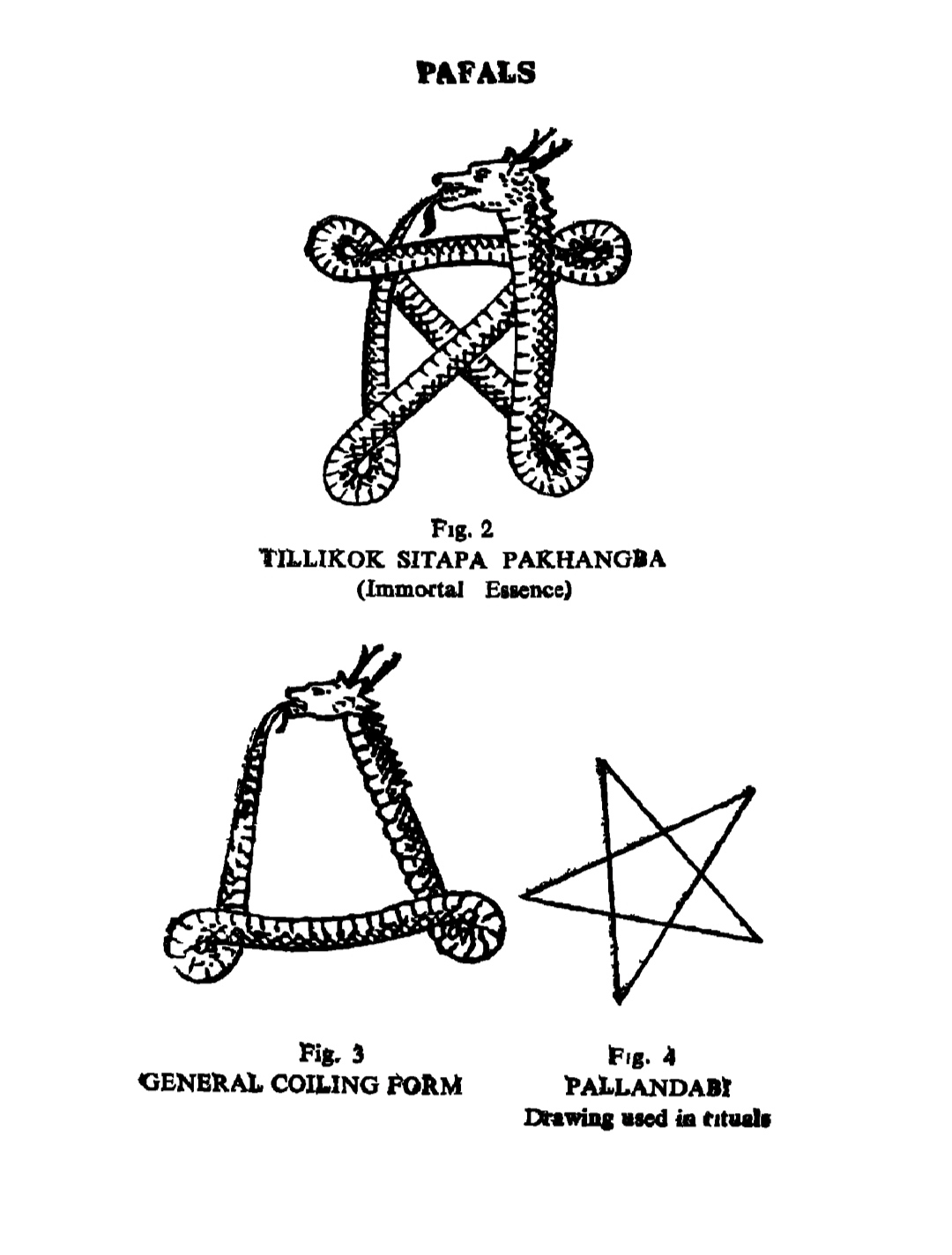

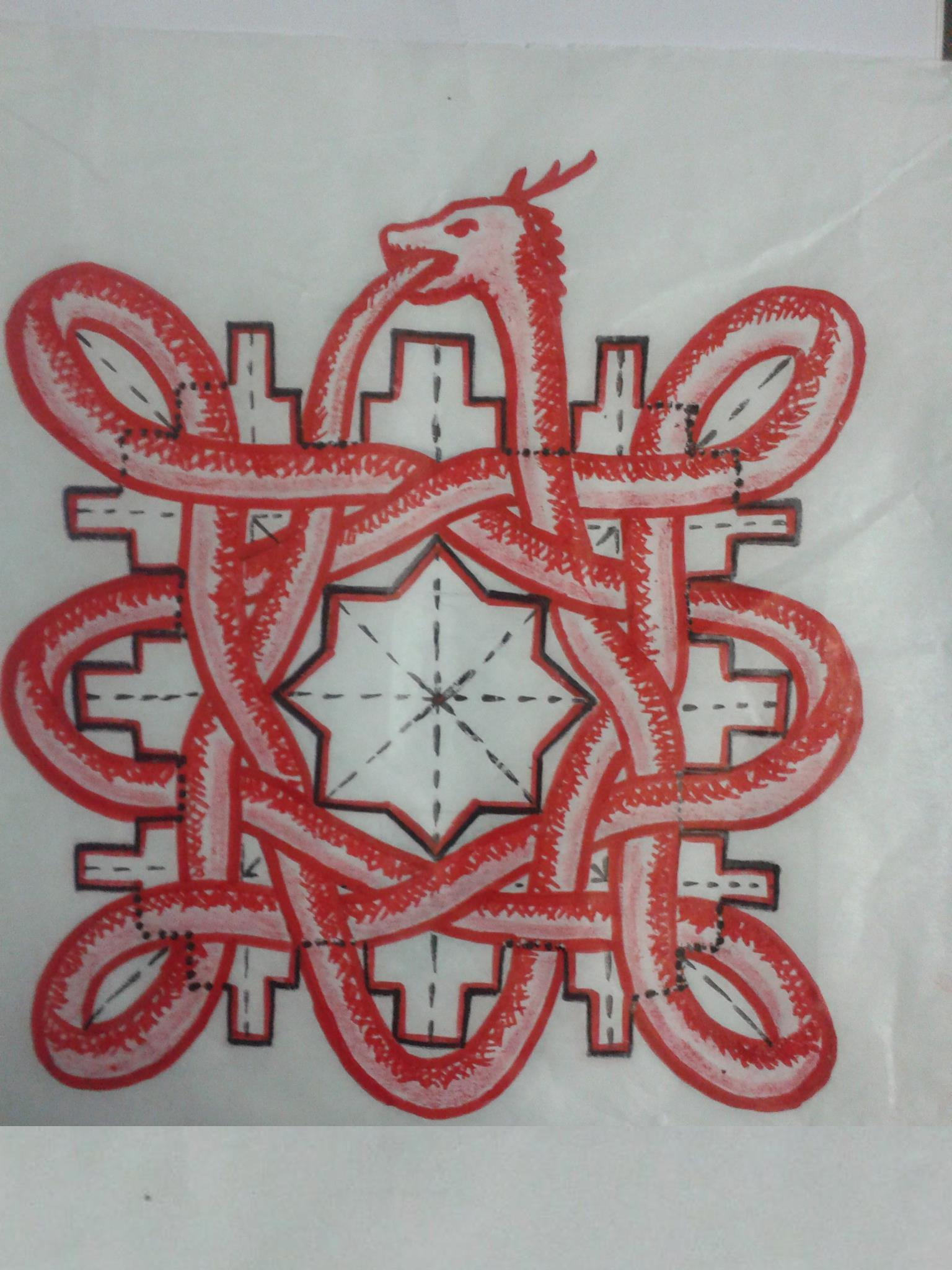

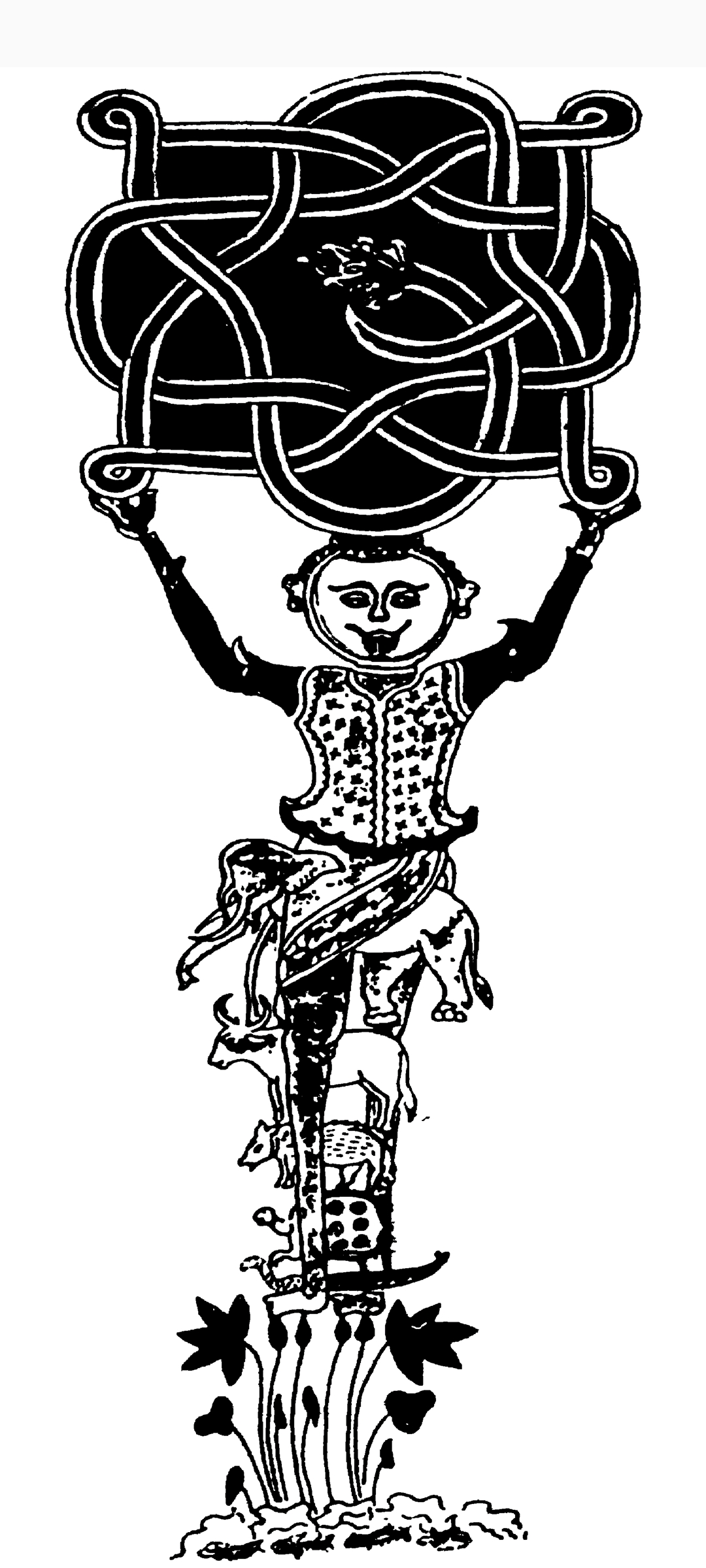

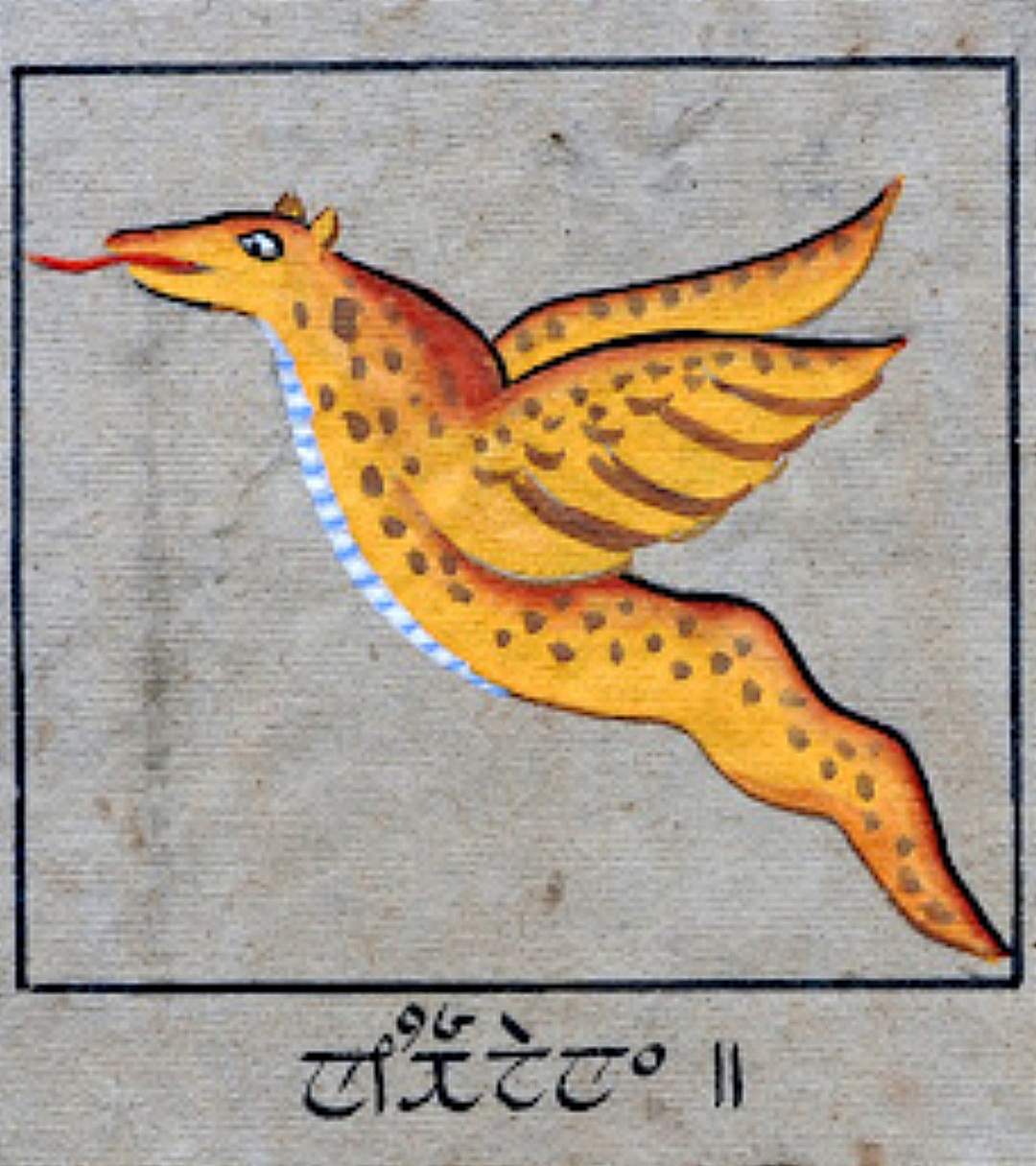

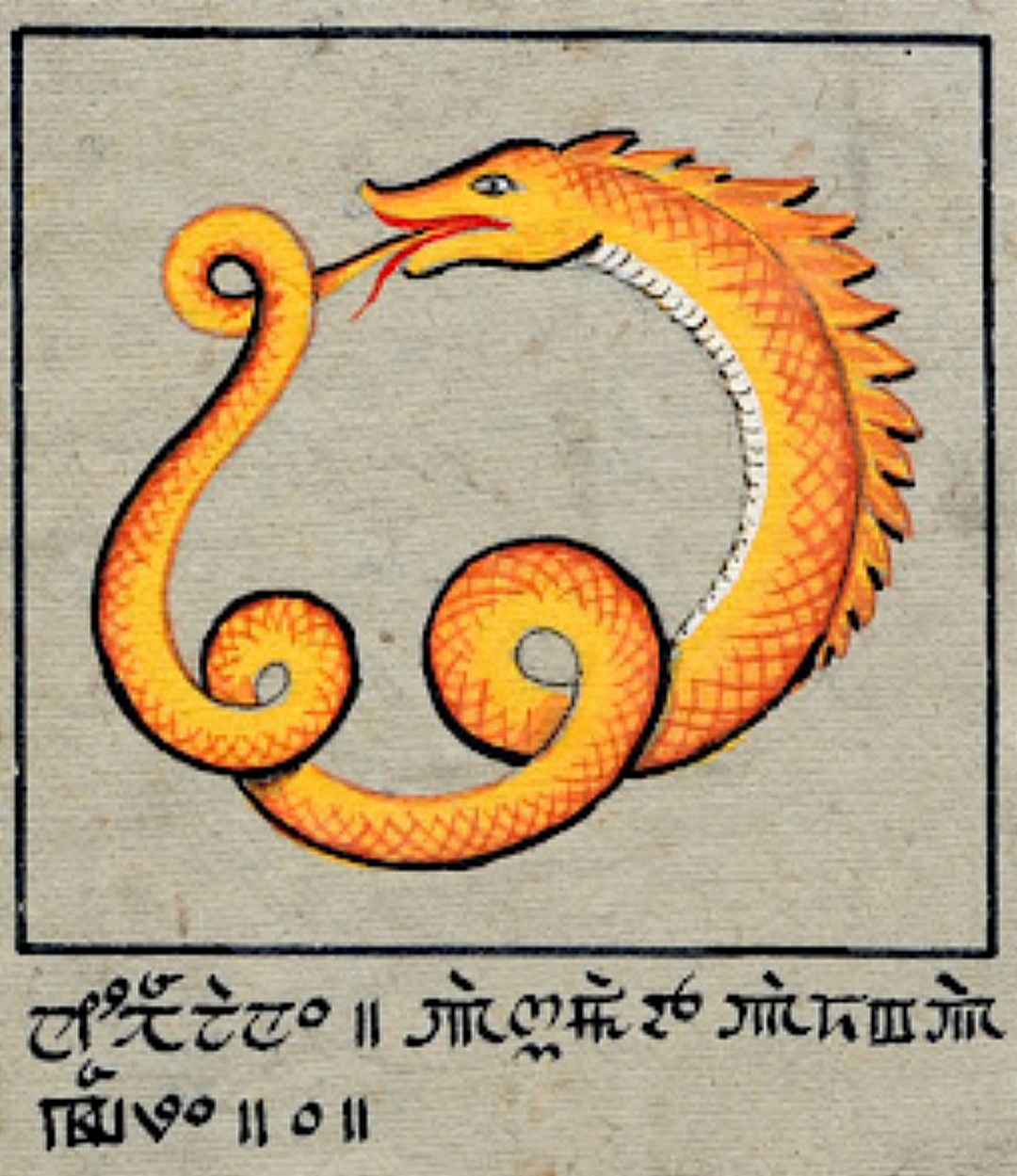

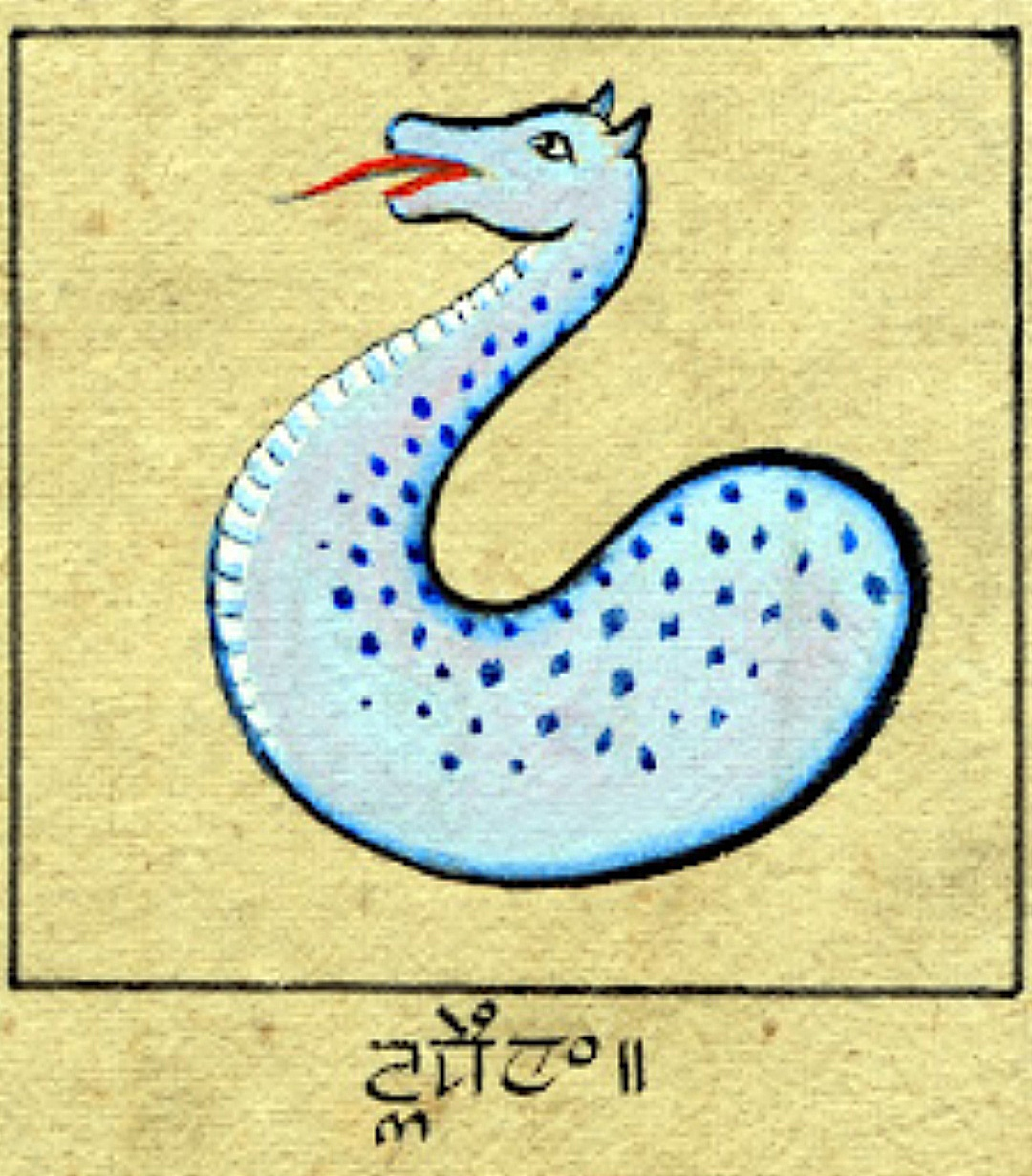

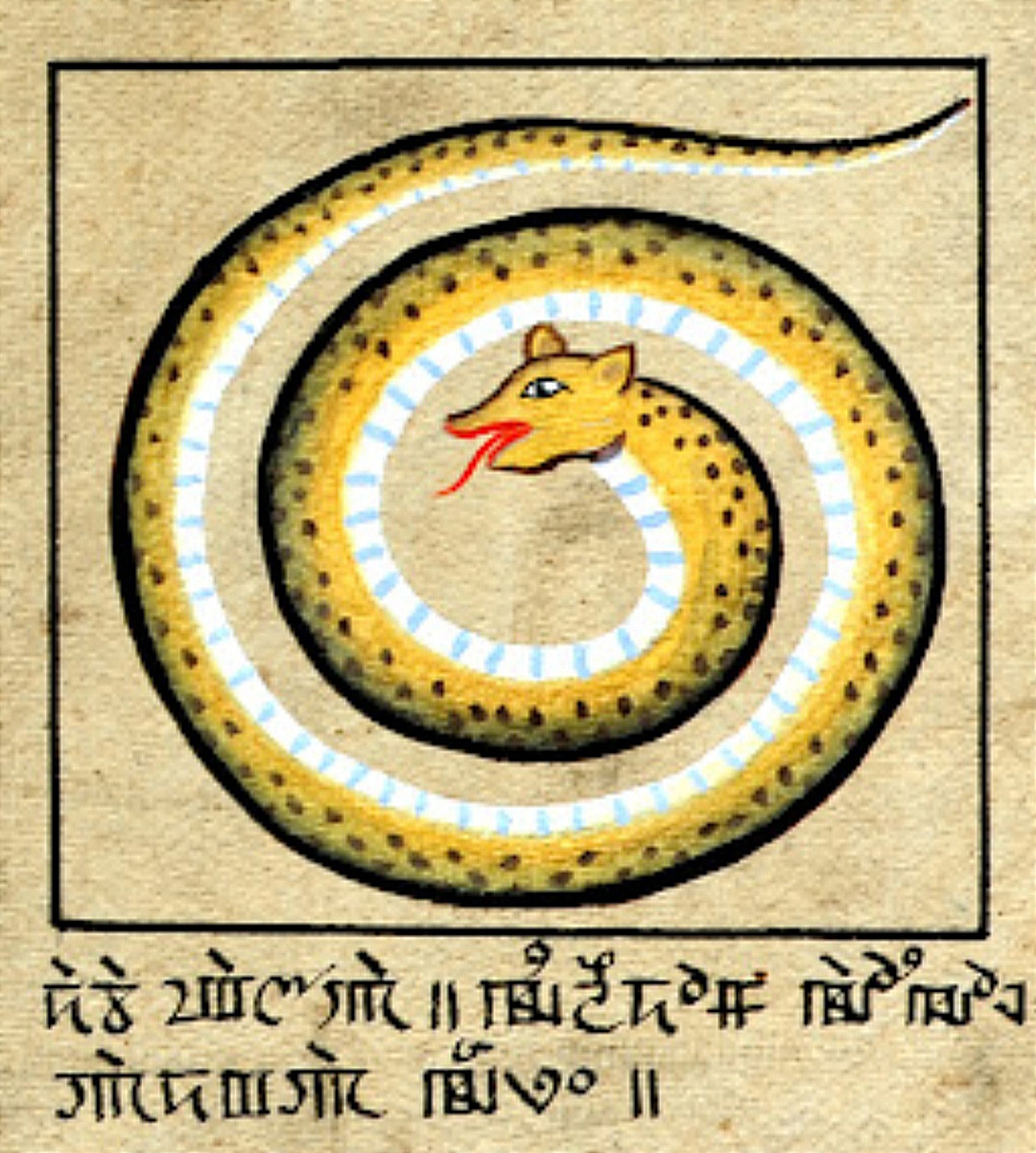

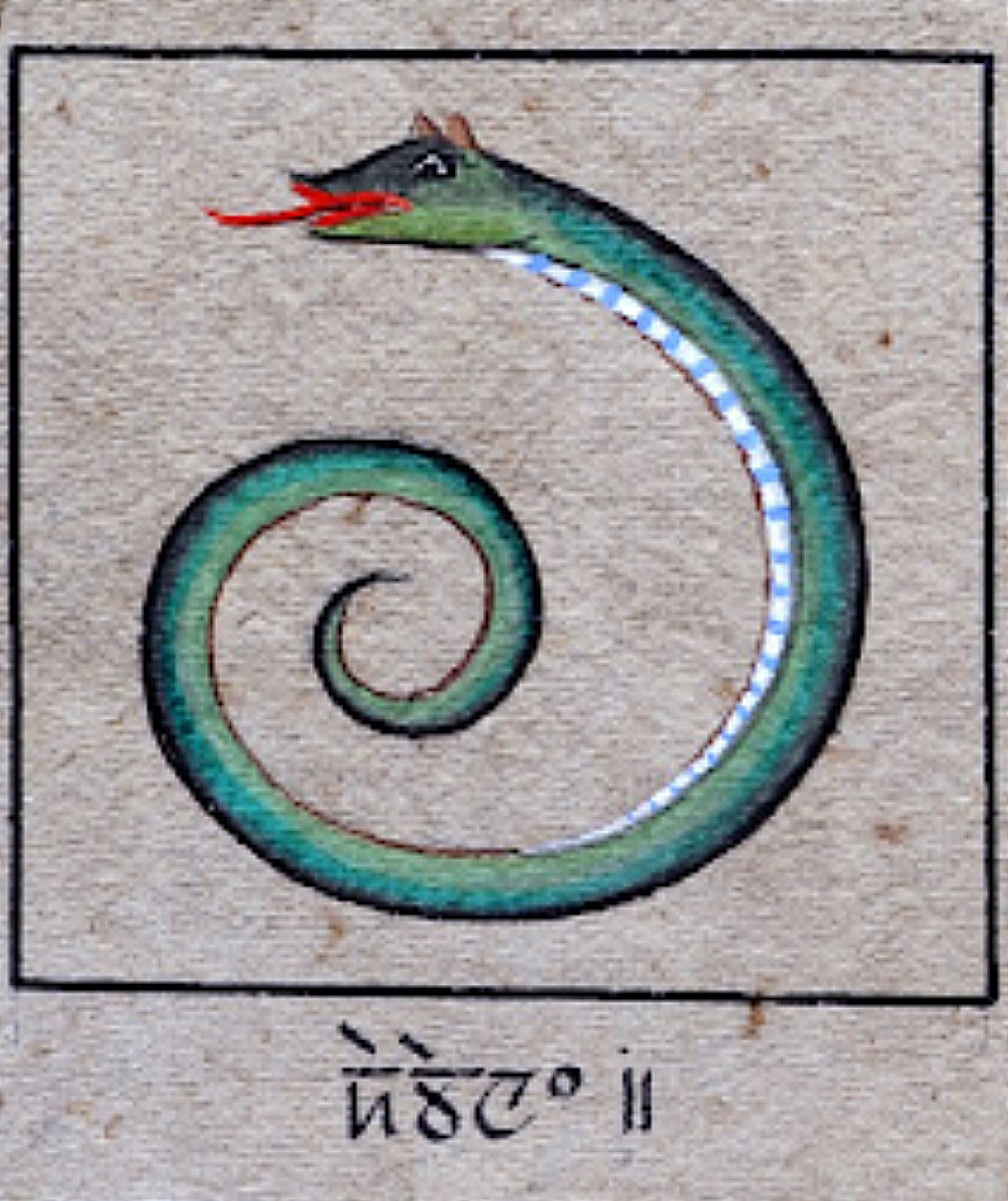

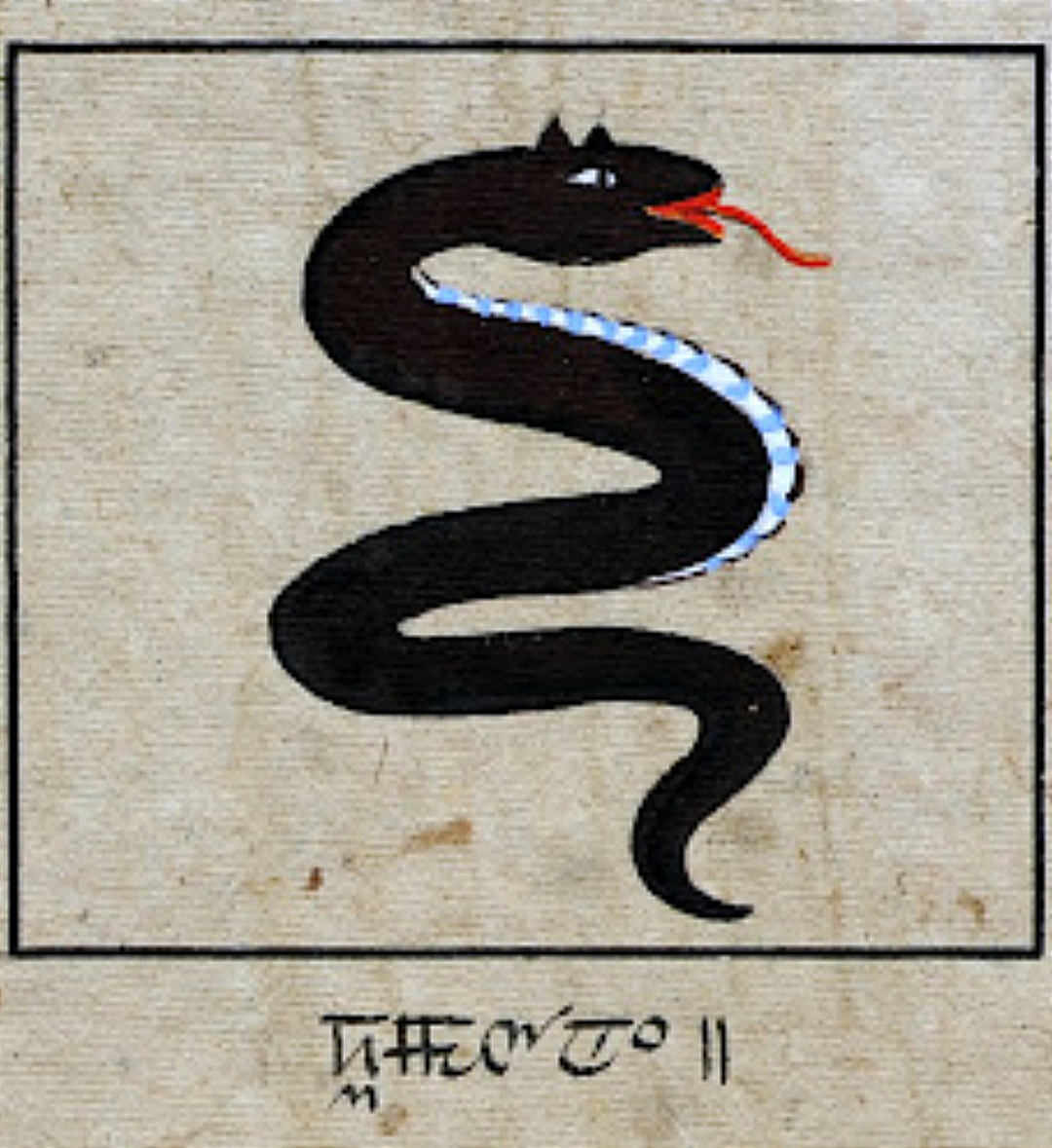

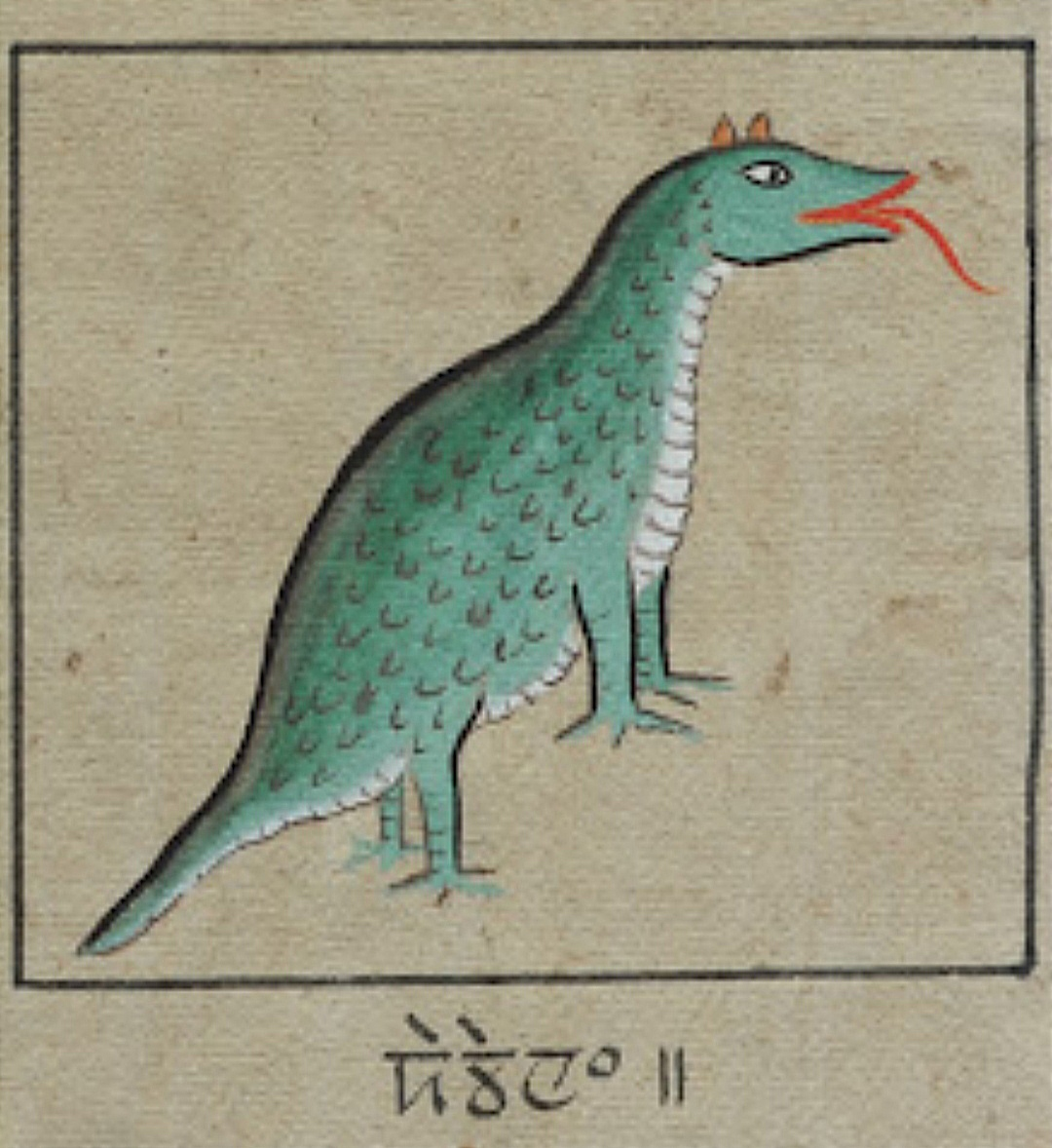

== See also ==
- Taoroinai
- Poubi Lai
- Pakhangba
- Meitei royal etiquette
- Meitei deities
- Hiyang Hiren

== Bibliography ==
- Mutua Bahadur, Manuscript Paintings of Manipur, published by M. Sanahanbi Devi, 2nd Edition, 1978
- Mutua Bahadur, Subika Laisaba, published by Mutua Museum, 1991
- P. Gunindra Singh, Manipuri Numismatics, published by Mutua Museum, 1983.
- Gita Narayanan, The Language of Symbols, The Crafts Council of India, Madras
- L. Ibungohal Singh & N. Khelchandra Singh, Cheitharol Kumbaba, published by Manipuri Sahitya Parishad, 1st Edn. 1967
- N. Indramani Singh, Seminar Paper, The old manuscripts and Its indigenous methods of preservation and conservation in Manipur, MRC & Manipur State Archives, January 2005.
- Mutua Bahadur, Seminar Paper, Different indigenous materials used for writing the old manuscript and their conservation technique, MRC and Manipur State Archives, January 2005.
