= International Sanamahism Students' Association =

International organization of students

- International Sanamahism Students' Association, Kangleipak
- Malem Sanamahi Laining Maheiroi Lup (Meitei)
- Logo of the International Sanamahism Students' Association, Kangleipak
- Abbreviation: ISSA
- Named after: Students of Sanamahism
- Formation: 25 September 2014; 12 years ago
- Founded at: Kangla, Imphal
- Type: Nonprofit, NGO
- Legal status: active
- Origins: Kangleipak (Meitei for 'Manipur')
- Region served: South Asia
- Official language: Meitei language (officially called Manipuri language)
- General Secretary: Lourembam Kangleinganba
- President: Khaidem Kangleingakpa
- Affiliations: Sanamahism

The International Sanamahism Students' Association (ISSA) (Meitei: Malem Sanamahi Laining Maheiroi Lup), also called the International Sanamahism Students' Association, Kangleipak (Meitei: Malem Sanamahi Laining Maheiroi Lup, Kangleipak), is an international non-governmental organization of students of Sanamahism (traditional Meitei religion). It gives its services to the conservation and the upraising of the practices of Sanamahism in the society. It also draws the attention to the government of Manipur state to take up essential steps to protect Sanamahism from getting extinct.

== Foundation day celebrations ==
The International Sanamahism Students' Association celebrate its annual foundation day events on (Note: The dates for the celebration of the foundation day are not always same every year.):

- 14 October 2015 - as the 1st foundation day at Manipur Press Club
- 21 September 2017 - as the 4th foundation day at Lamyanba Shanglen, Palace Compound, Imphal
- 29 September 2019 - as the 6th foundation day at Lamyanba Sanglen, Konung Lampak, Imphal
- 7 Oct 2021 - as the 8th foundation day at the Manipur Press Club in Imphal

== Felicitation of the King ==
In February 2021, the International Sanamahism Students' Association felicitated Leishemba Sanajaoba (Meitei: ꯂꯩꯁꯦꯝꯕ ꯁꯅꯥꯖꯥꯎꯕ), the then titular King of Manipur as well as the Member of Parliament (Rajya Sabha) at the Imphal Airport (Bir Tikendrajit International Airport) for raising the discussions of enlisting Kangla in the list of World Heritage Sites and the inclusion of the Meitei Mayek (Meitei for 'Meitei script') in the Indian currency during the sessions for the Indian parliament. In response to their encouragement and recognition of his deeds, Sanajaoba said that the efforts to officially recognize Meitei language as an Indian classical language was "in the process of materialisation".

== Training camp ==
From 24 April 2019 to 28 April 2019, the International Sanamahism Students' Association organised a 5-day students' leadership training camp at the District Institute of Education and Training (DIET) in Keikol, with the aim "to cultivate the youths with the sense of belongingness and spirit of nationalism."

== Quiz competition ==
On 22 September 2019, the International Sanamahism Students' Association organized a quiz competition titled "Know Your Kangleipak (Manipur)" at GP Women's College, Imphal. As said by Khaidem Kangleingakpa, the president of the ISSA, the event was organised with the objective to know the land of Kangleipak (Meitei for 'Manipur').

== Actions against "vulgar portrayal" ==
In October 2017, the International Sanamahism Students' Association demanded clarification from author Omor Singh Wangkhem and Kangla Printers regarding the book The Writers Mahabharatta & Rammayana as the Real Religious Scientists (Note: The spellings of the Mahabharata and Ramayana are those used by the author.), while the Manipuri Students' Federation burned copies of the book, which compared Meitei goddesses to prostitutes.

Later, through the Meitei language newspaper daily Hueiyen Lanpao, the author apologized to the angered associations for his misdeeds.

== Tree plantation programs ==
On 14 July 2019, the International Sanamahism Students' Association, along with the "Kangla Enat Yokhat Lup" (Meitei: ꯀꯪꯂꯥ ꯏꯅꯥꯠ ꯌꯣꯈꯠ ꯂꯨꯞ), "Salai Taret Punshi Luptil" (Meitei: ꯁꯂꯥꯏ ꯇꯔꯦꯠ ꯄꯨꯟꯁꯤ ꯂꯨꯞꯇꯤꯜ), "Kangleipak Chaokhatna Lup" (Meitei: ꯀꯪꯂꯩꯄꯥꯛ ꯆꯥꯎꯈꯠꯅ ꯂꯨꯞ), organised a tree plantation program at Langol Punsilok (Meitei: ꯂꯥꯡꯒꯣꯜ ꯄꯨꯟꯁꯤꯂꯣꯛ), Imphal, to achieve a greener Manipur. They selectively planted the indigenous trees in the event to save indigenous plant species. During the event, the organization also reminded the participants about the ancient Meitei ways to preserved forests, in which the Umang Lai (Meitei: ꯎꯃꯪ ꯂꯥꯏ) shrines used to preserve forested areas and at least one pond was kept near each site.

== Resolving conflicts ==
In February 2021, the International Sanamahism Students' Association, serving as a conflict resolver, appealed to the two opposing student groups of the Manipur University of Culture (MUC) to agree the orders of the vice chancellor of the institution, regarding the admission to Master's degree.

== See also ==
- Lainingthou Sanamahi Temple Board (LSTB)
- Lainingthou Sanamahi Sana Pung (LSSP)
- Lainingthou Sanamahi Kiyong
- University of Sanamahi Culture
