= Temple Development Board =

Type of government body in India

Temple Development Board are statutory and independent bodies created for the governing and management of temples in India. With the passing of the Madras Regulation Act in the year 1817, temples were brought under the control of the East India Company, a corporate organisation. The concept of a temple included its premises and wealth. However, from 1925, temples were brought under government control with the passing of the State Religious and Charitable Endowments Act. Under this Act, the state governments exercised power for the formation of temple development boards for major temples with the members from local city.

== Composition ==
A temple development board includes a chairman, vice chairman, and other members appointed by the state government.

== Roles and Responsibilities ==
The roles and responsibilities of a temple development board include the following:

- Ensuring performance of rituals.
- Development and maintenance of temples in other towns.
- Ensuring security of the temple property.
- Ensuring welfare of pilgrims.
- Look after welfare of staff.
- Hygiene preparation of Prasad.
- Road Maintenance and drinking water supply in premises.

== Major Temple Development Boards ==
- Lainingthou Sanamahi Temple Board (LSTB) - dedicated to Lord Lainingthou Sanamahi and other ancient Meitei deities - headquartered in Imphal West district, Manipur
- Tirumala Tirupati Devasthanams (TTD).
- Yadagirigutta Temple Development Authority (YTDA)

== See also ==
- Temple
