= Laishang =

Sacred shrine of Umang Lai

Laishang or Laisang or Khubam or Ebudhou Ebendhou Khubam (Note: "Ebudhou" means male ancestor, "Ebendhou" means female ancestor and "khubam" means abode; "Umang" means forest and "Lai" means deity/ancestor) is a shrine to a specific deity or ancestor in Sanamahism. These structures also serve very important role in Lai Haraoba ceremony. The usual annual Lai Haraoba ceremonies of various Umang Lai (forest deities) are performed inside Laisang of these Umang-lai (deities of the forest or jungle)
