= Nongmaiching Reserved Forest =

Reserved forest in Imphal East, Manipur, India

Nongmaiching Reserved Forest (Nongmaiching Forest Reserve) Meitei: Nongmaiching Umang
- The Government of Manipur is the sole owner of the Nongmaiching Reserved Forest. (Note: The fact that the Manipur Government is the owner of the Nongmaiching Reserved Forest is popularly discussed as the villagers settling encroaching inside the reserved forest areas tried to oppose the fact violently in recent years.)

Geography
- Location: Imphal East, Manipur, India
- Area: 67 sq km (previously 74.7 sq km)

Administration
- Status: reserved (under the Indian Forest Act, 1927)
- Events: Earth Day; International Day of Forests (World Forestry Day); Van Mahotsav; World Environment Day
- Authority: Government of Manipur

Ecology
- Ecosystem: Nongmaiching Ching

The Nongmaiching Reserved Forest (Meitei: Nongmaiching Umang), also unofficially spelled as the Nongmaijing Reserved Forest (Meitei: Nongmaijing Umang), (Note: The terms "Nongmaiching" (Meitei: ꯅꯣꯡꯃꯥꯏꯆꯤꯡ) and "Nongmaijing" (Meitei: ꯅꯣꯡꯃꯥꯏꯖꯤꯡ) are interchangeably used. But "Nongmaiching" is the one mentioned officially in the "Manipur Gazette".) is one of the eight reserved forests of Imphal East district of Manipur. Covering an area of 67 square kilometers, it protects the forests of the Nongmaiching Ching mountains.

== History ==
On February 16, 1966, it was notified for the first time, under section 4 of the Indian Forest Act, 1927, that the Nongmaiching Reserve Forest, covered an area of 74.7 square km.

On July 7, 1966, under the section 6 of the Act, the officer of the forest settlement proclaimed an invitation to claims and objections. It was responded by 20 claims. Among them, one is from Yamkhokhai, chief of Nongmaipal village. The forest survey officer settled the received claims and objections.

And finally, on January 4, 1990, under section 20 of the Indian Forest Act, 1927, it was notified that the area of the Nongmaiching Reserve Forest was 67 square km. It was because an area covering 7.07 square km was spared from the Nongmaiching Reserved Forest areas, for settlement of the villagers. On 17 January 1990, the Manipur Gazette number 41 also published the notification informing about it.

The Nongmaipal village shifted its settlement area twice, from its former place in the years, 1985 and 1995. The villagers had their final settlement at the present site in the Nongmaiching Reserve Forest, violating the Indian Forest Act, 1927.

Later on, the village chief as well as other accomplices, encroaching the reserved forest areas, started stone mining activities as well as human settlements. Under the Indian Forest Act, they were arrested and fined.

On the World Environment Day 2022, the villagers violently attempted to stop the forest department officials and environment lovers from planting trees in the Nongmaiching Reserved Forest areas, claiming themselves as the authority over the reserved forest areas. Among the violent activities, they even tored the backdrop set up for the tree plantation drive. Later, the tribal criminals, including the village chief, were arrested.

In response to the incident happened on the World Environment Day in the Nongmaiching reserved forest area, a joint meet of Coordinating Body Khurai, Joint Forest Management Committee and Laining Ejaat Kanba formed a committee named the "Nongmaiching Laiphamlen And Its Environment Preservation Committee" to safeguard the Nongmaiching Ching due to the fact that the mountain is a sacred place to the Meitei people.

== Eviction ==
On 3 July 2018, the Forest Department of the Government of Manipur conducted an eviction drive at the illegally encroached areas in the areas of the Awaching (Kobithabi) in Nongmaiching Reserve Forest.

== Deforestation ==
Hueiyen Lanpao, a newspaper service, inspected the areas affected by 2012 thunderstorm in the villages of Angourok, Sagolock, Awangching and Kangamthabi in Imphal East district. Many trees were missing, much more than those affected by the thunderstorm. Upon investigation, it was found out that most trees (which were around 20 years old) were cut down inside the Nongmaiching Reserved Forest area. It was also found out that the villagers living in Keirao, Langdum, Uran Chiru and Yaipharok Maring Khul, cut down the trees during night time and they transported the woods using the trucks during the day time. They also found out that the officials working in the Irilbung Forest Beat remain silent seeing all the illegal activities of deforestation happening under their nose.

== Forestation ==
On the International Day of Forests 2013, the Forest Department of the Government of Manipur announced about a program for the replenishment of the green covers of the Nongmaiching.

On the 73rd Van Mahotsav (transl. Forest Festival) in the year 2022, Nongthombam Biren, the then Manipur Chief Minister, led a plantation drive of plant saplings at the Eshing Chaibi area of the Nongmaiching Reserved Forest.

== Challenges in tree plantation programs ==
Claiming authority or ownership of the reserved forest areas, several tribals opposed the tree plantation programs organised by the Forest Department officials, resulting in violent conflicts many times.

In the year 2017, as a part of the Van Mahotsav (transl. Forest Festival) celebration, the forest department officials, along with workers, dug holes for the plantation of tree saplings inside the Nongmaiching reserved forest area. However, the Maring tribals living in the Sandang Senba Maring village opposed the forestation program by filling up the dug holes and sowing bean seeds, claiming their authority over the reserved forest areas. As a result, there was a strong conflict between the two parties. Later on, upon notifying the provisions of the law, the villagers stopped their actions.

As a part of the celebration of the World Environment Day 2022, many environment lovers including the forest department officials of the Central Forest Division tried to plant trees in the Nongmaiching Reserve Forest. However, they were stopped violently by the Kuki tribal villagers of Nongmaipal village, attempting not to allow the planters the tree plantation activity. Upon investigation, the tribal villagers were found out to be illegally setting inside the reserved forest areas, violating the Indian Forest Act, 1927. Later, the tribal rebels were arrested under the law concerned.

== See also ==
- Reserved forests and protected forests of India
- Heingang Ching
  - Marjing Polo Complex
  - Marjing Polo Statue
- Kangla
  - Kangla Nongpok Thong
  - Kangla Nongpok Torban
- Mount Manipur
  - Mount Manipur Memorial
