= Lainingthou Sanamahi Kiyong =

Meitei temple in Imphal East, Manipur, India

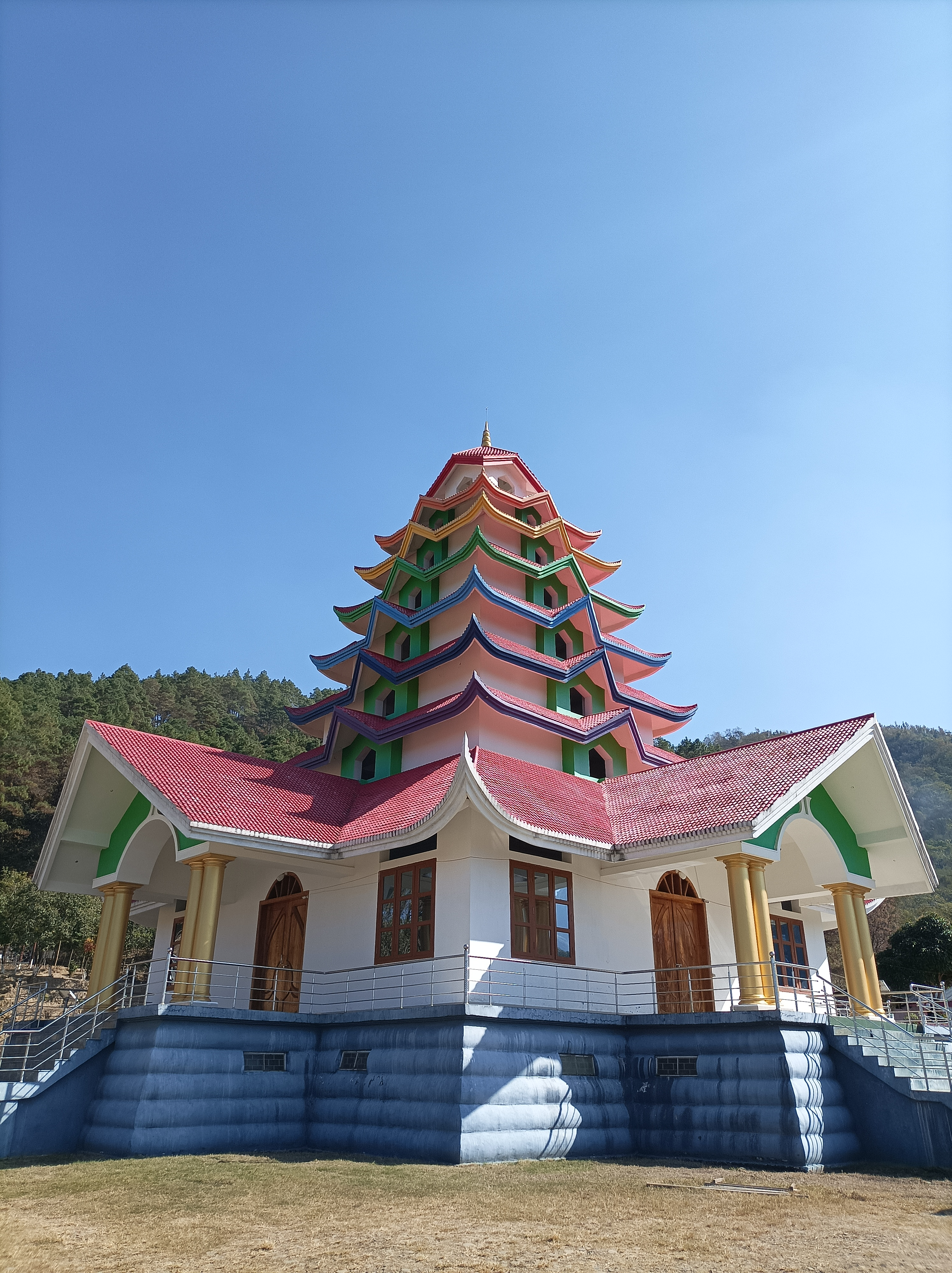
- An afternoon scene of the Lainingthou Sanamahi Kiyong

Religion
- Affiliation: Sanamahism (Meitei religion)
- Sect: Lainingthou Sanamahi worship
- District: Imphal East district
- Province: Kangleipak (Meitei for 'Manipur')
- Region: Nongmaiching Mountain (Selloi Langmai Mountain)
- Deity: Lainingthou Sanamahi
- Ecclesiastical or organisational status: active
- Governing body: "Sanamahi Lainingkol" (University of Sanamahi Culture)
- Year consecrated: 2019
- Status: active

Location
- Location: Nongmaiching mountains (Selloi Langmai mountains)
- Municipality: Sangsabi
- State: Manipur
- Country: India
- Interactive map of Lainingthou Sanamahi Kiyong
- Coordinates: 24.80505°N 94.03543°E

Architecture
- Type: Meitei architecture
- Style: Meitei architecture
- Funded by: followers of Sanamahism
- Established: 8 June 2019; 7 years ago
- Groundbreaking: 2006
- Completed: 2019

Specifications
- Height (max): 75 feet (23 m)
- Dome: 1
- Minaret: 1
- Spire: 1
- Temple: 1
- Monument: 1
- Shrine: 1
- Inscriptions: 1
- Elevation: 980 m (3,215 ft)

The Lainingthou Sanamahi Kiyong (Meitei for 'Lainingthou Sanamahi Shrine'), officially known as the Laiyingthou Sanamahi Kiyong (Meitei for 'Laiyingthou Sanamahi Shrine'), (Note: The terms "Lainingthou" (Meitei: ꯂꯥꯏꯅꯤꯡꯊꯧ) and "Laiyingthou" (Meitei: ꯂꯥꯏꯌꯤꯡꯊꯧ) are interchangeably used with no change in the word meaning.) is a temple of God Lainingthou Sanamahi of Meitei religion (Sanamahism), built on the Nongmaiching mountain (Selloi Langmai mountain) in the Imphal East district of Kangleipak (Meitei for 'Manipur'). It is a center of the Sanamahism followers in Manipur. It is the central body of the "Sanamahi Lainingkol" (University of Sanamahi Culture) at Chingoi Maru Langmaiching (Nongmaiching).

The Sanamahi Kiyong is a religious destination and a pilgrimage site for the Meitei people, even for those living outside Manipur in other Northeast Indian states and also for the Kabui people and the Zeliangrong people living in Manipur, Assam and Tripura inside India as well as in Myanmar and Bangladesh.

== Aim ==
The construction of the Sanamahi Kiyong temple aims at the establishment of a university of Sanamahi religion on the Nongmaiching mountain. It was built according to a 2002 resolution adopted at a public meeting having a goal to construct a university for Sanamahism, with the aim to teach the future generations of people about the ancient Meitei culture of the Sanamahi religion, offering its students various subjects about indigenous art forms, dance forms, music, Thang-Ta and Sagol Kangjei (Meitei for 'polo') etc.

== Architecture ==
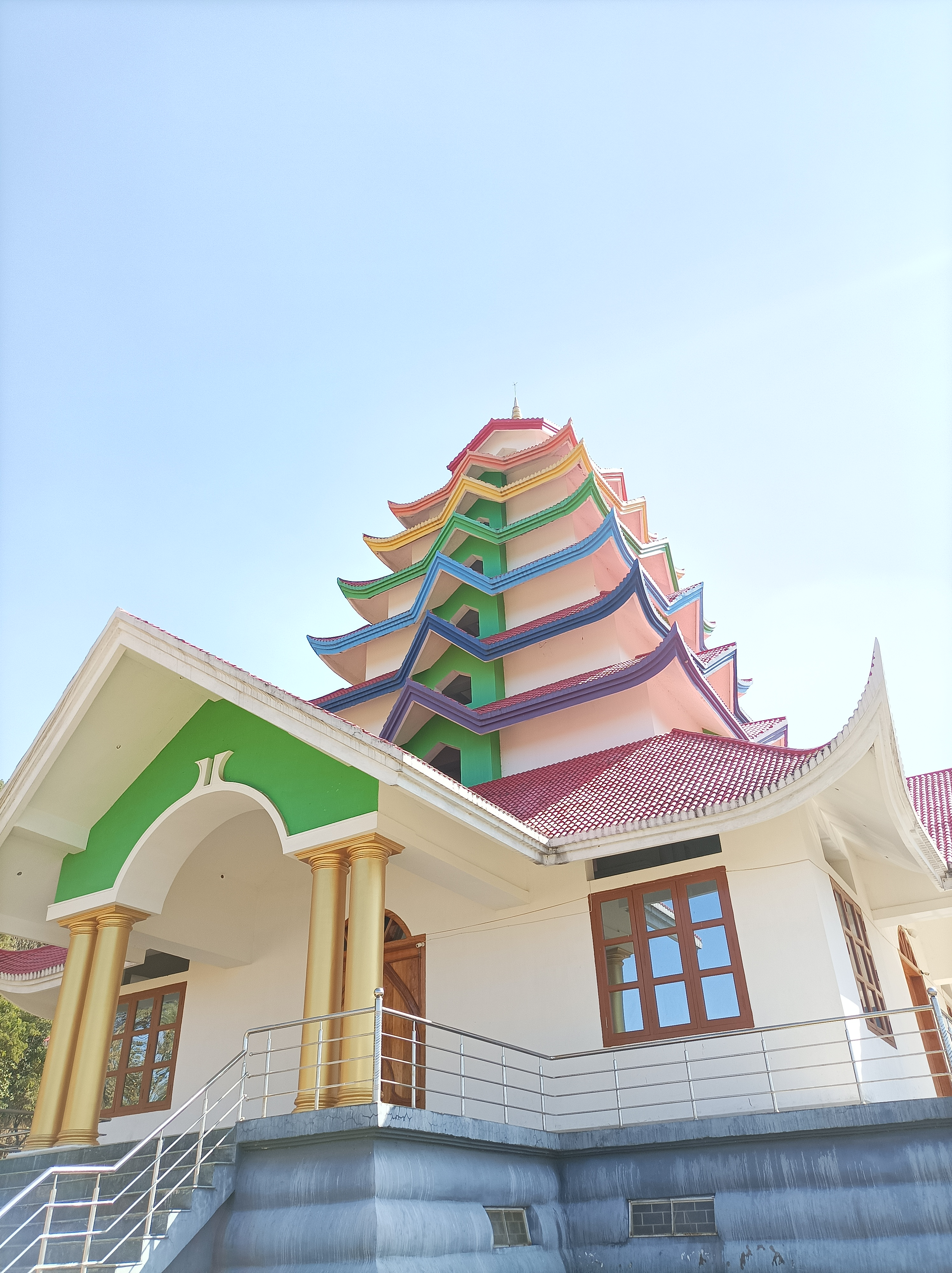

The Sanamahi Kiyong is 75 feet (23 m) tall. It has 7 stories, that represent the seven clans (Meitei: Salai) of the Meitei people. The 7 stories are painted in the colours of the 7 Meitei clans.

== Construction ==
The construction of the Sanamahi Kiyong started in the year 2006. It was done through the donated funds raised from the public. As of March 2012, the construction cost reached ₹2 crore (equivalent to ₹4.1 crore or US$430,000 in 2026) and the then estimation of net cost was around ₹3 crore (equivalent to ₹6.2 crore or US$640,000 in 2026).

== Inauguration ==
The Sanamahi Kiyong was previously planned to be inaugurated on 16 May 2019. But it was postponed to 8 June 2019 because religious leaders advised that it should be done on Meitei month of Enga (Meitei: ꯏꯉꯥ, romanized: ī-ngā) and not on the month of Kalen (Meitei: ꯀꯥꯂꯦꯟ, romanized: kā-len) and 8 June falls on Enga, the favourable month.

On 8 June 2019, the Sanamahi Kiyong Hongba (Meitei for 'inauguration of the Kiyong-Temple') was organised by the "Foundation For University of Sanamahi Culture" and the "Laiyingthou Sanamahi Thougal Kanglup". The event was attended by N Hiyainu, wife of Nongthombam Biren, the then Chief Minister of Manipur.

== Gallery ==
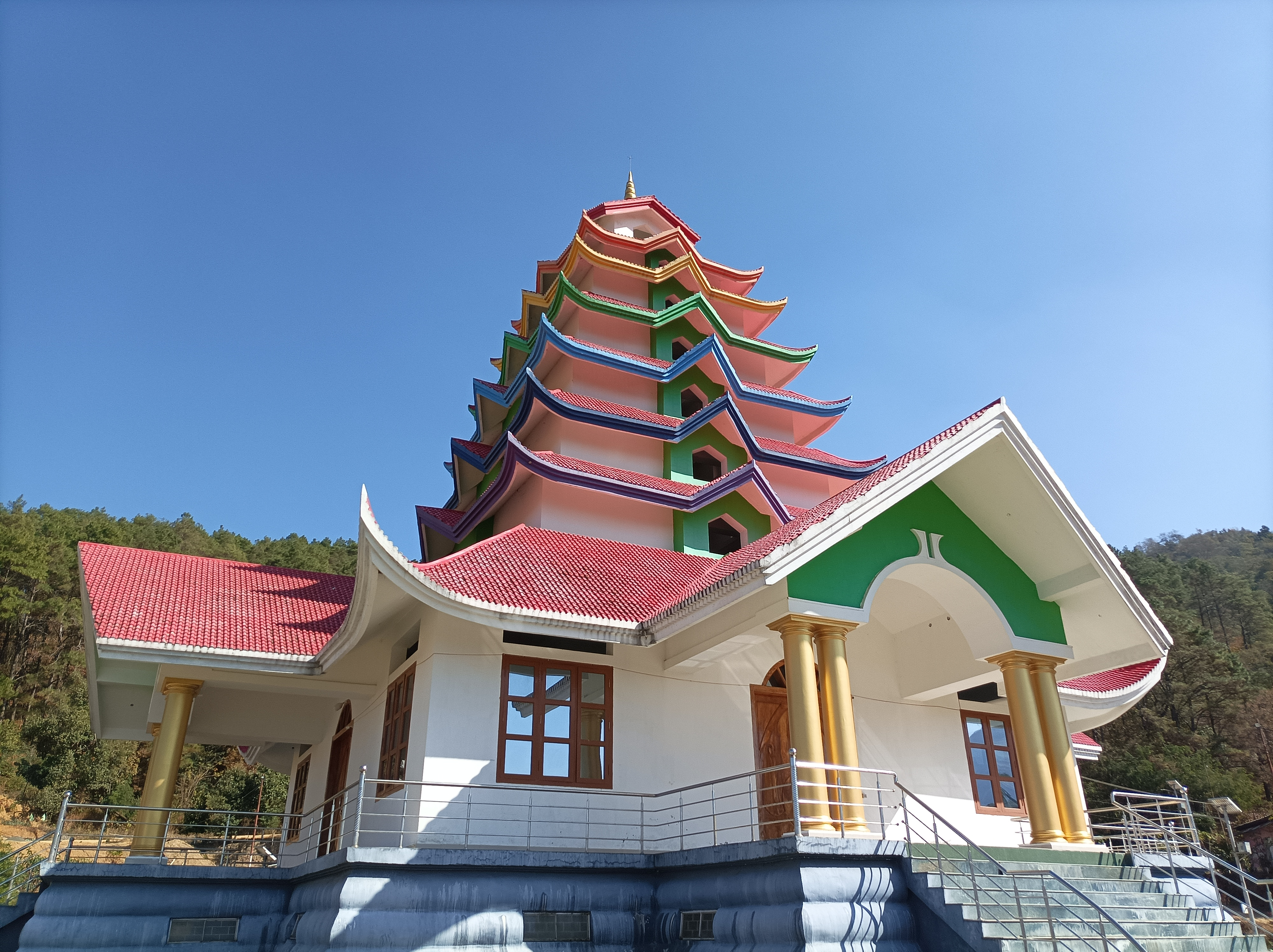

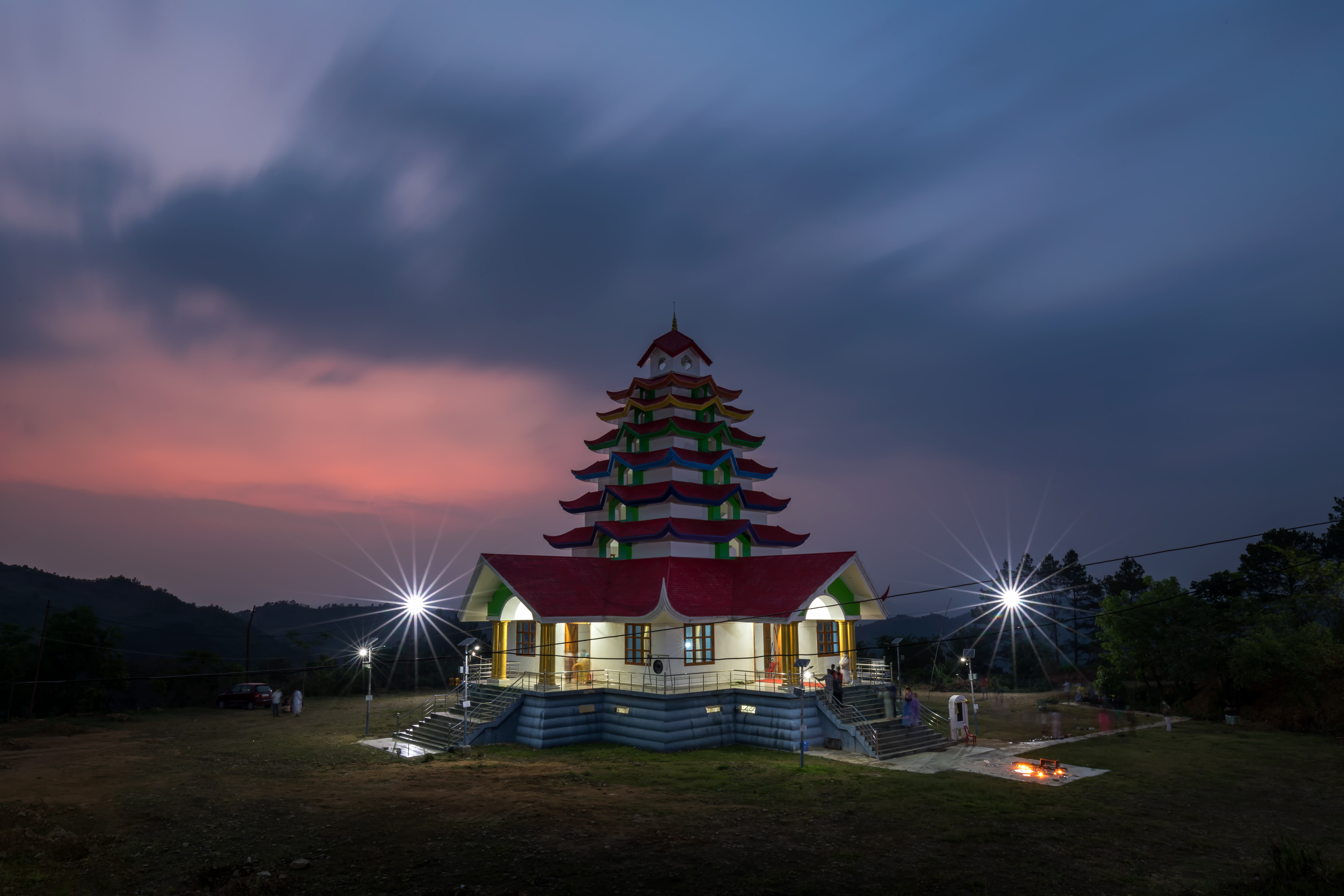

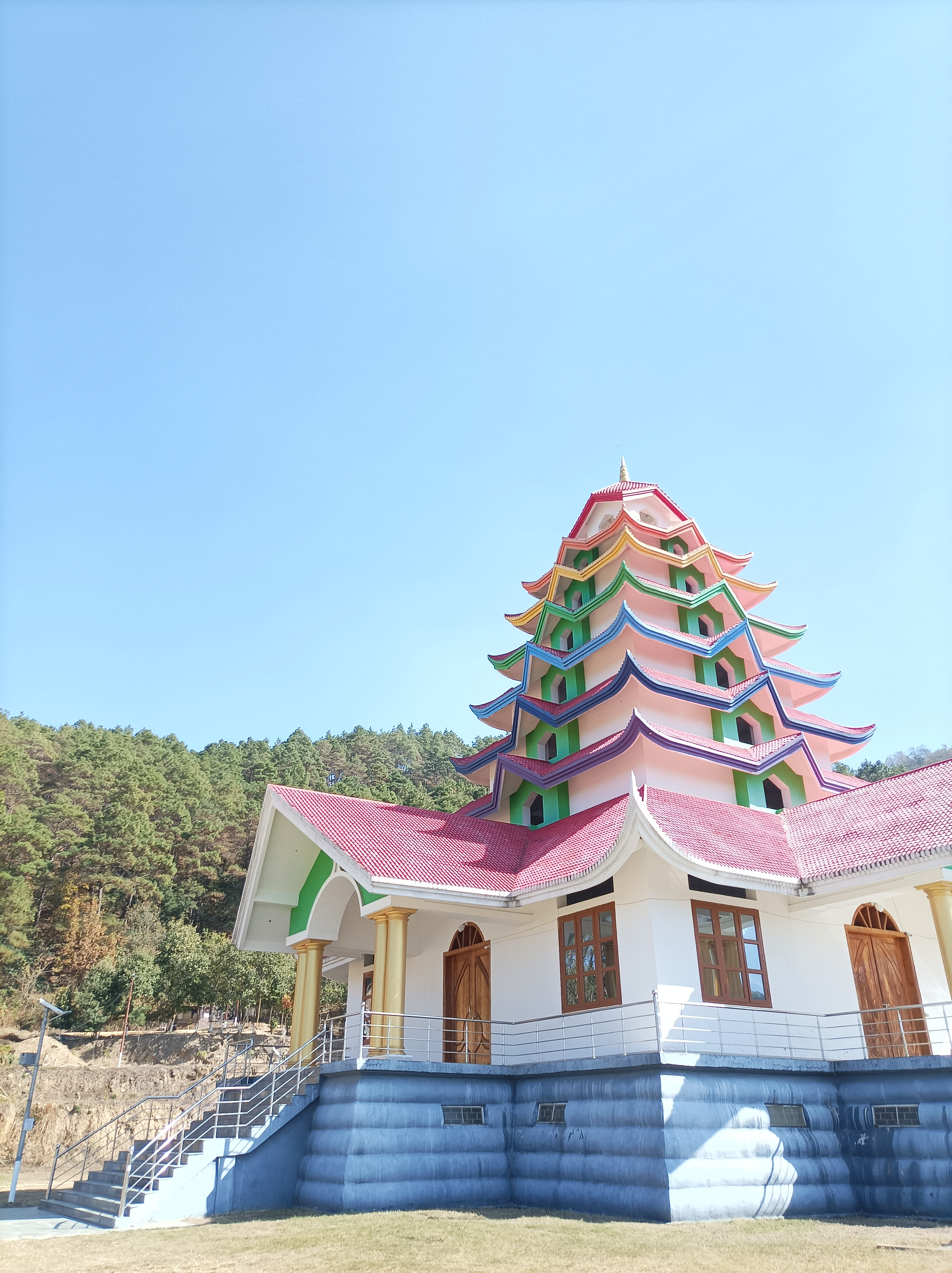

== See also ==
- Nongmaiching Ching
  - Nongmaiching Reserved Forest
- Heingang Ching
  - Marjing Polo Complex
  - Marjing Polo Statue
- Hiyangthang Lairembi Temple
- Kangla
  - Kangla Nongpok Thong
  - Kangla Nongpok Torban
