= Van Mahotsav =

Tree planting week in India

Van Mahothsavlit. 'Forest festival', is an annual one-week tree-planting festival in India which is celebrated in the first week of July. It is a great traditional Indian festival that reflects Indian culture and heritage to honor and love mother earth by planting trees, by creating awareness of nature's beauty, and by fostering an environment to promote the concept of reduce, reuse, and recycle. The words “Van” and “Mahotsav” are derived from Sanskrit language. “Van” which can also be spelled as “Vana” refers to “Forest”, and “Mahotsav” is a combination of “Maha” meaning great and “Utsav” meaning festival. So the literal meaning of “Van Mahotsav” can be deduced to “A Great Forest-Festival”, an event which is celebrated by the Indian community throughout the world with the central theme of planting trees.

Overall, Van Mahotsav is an important occasion to raise awareness about the benefits of trees and to encourage people to become more active in environmental conservation efforts. By planting more trees, we can help mitigate the impact of climate change, protect the environment, and promote human well-being. The brilliant idea of reduce, reuse, and recycle directly correlates with contribution to answer global warming and foster nature. Van Mahotsav is for those who love mother earth, and also for those who are ignorant because they will also get to enjoy the natural equilibrium between good environment, beautiful weather, and pleasant climatic conditions. Celebrating this festival is directly related to significantly contributing to increase in the greenery of India, and subsequently the world.

== Origin and History ==
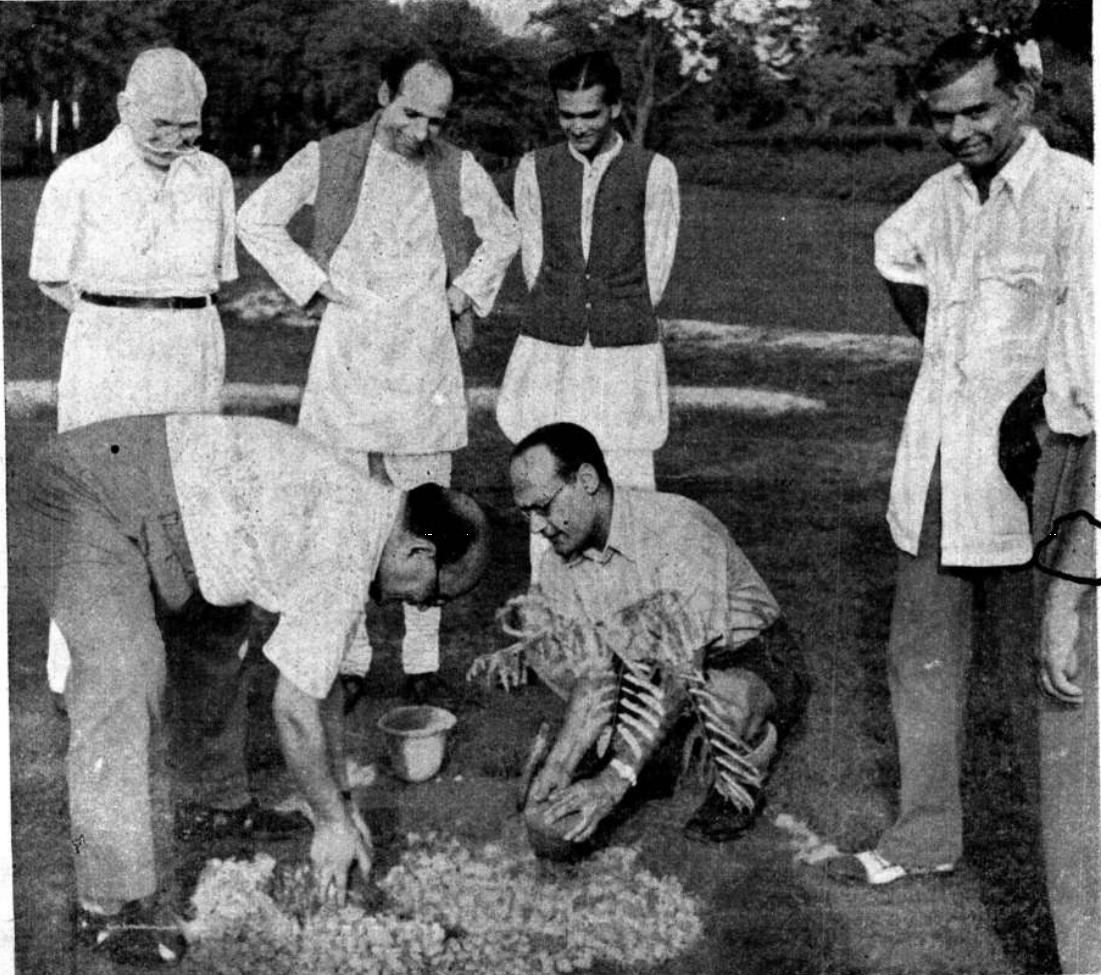
M. S. Randhawa planting a tree at Delhi.

Indian national tree planting week was organized by Mohinder Singh Randhawa from 20 to 27 July 1947. Randhawa had been inspired by ideas of a forest week, the festival of trees, or arbor days in various countries. The first event of 20 July 1947 was inaugurated with the planting of Bauhinia saplings by Khurshid Ahmad Khan, commissioner of Delhi in the morning and the afternoon, another ceremony was held at the Purana Qila led by the Vice President of the Interim Government, Nehru. Another day was called Ladies Day and involved planting at the Qutub Minar with participants including Lady Mountbatten. Nehru said that It was a matter of surprise to him that so far no interest had been taken in tree plantation. Large tracts of the country had become deserts owing to the negligence of the people who cut trees without realizing their great value. There should be a law that no one should cut a tree unless he had first planted a new one in its place. Gandhi was in Delhi at the time and noted it in his prayer speech "The official who originated the idea of tree planting did not do it for fancy nor was it meant only for the monied men. It began with them so that others would copy them and thus add to the wealth and rainfall of India. Deforestation led to diminished rainfall. Moreover, trees required little care except in the early stages. An acre of land used for growing fruit trees would yield more fruit than a crop of wheat on the same area..." The tradition was continued and made into a national activity in 1950 by the Minister of Food and Agriculture Kanaiyalal Maneklal Munshi who moved it to the first week of July and renamed it as Van Mahotsav in 1950.

=== A Movement Turns Into A Festival ===
Van Mahotsav has come a long way since it was first establishment - started as a movement, evolved to a crusade to save mother earth, got recognized as celebration of life in a number of states in India, and finally to a festival which is now recognized by many states as national holiday. Some say KM Munshi started the movement of Van Mahotsav in 1950 who was then serving as the Union Minister for Agriculture and Food. Some say the history of this movement traces back to the year 1947 when MS Randhawa, a Punjabi botanist, organized a tree plantation week from 20 to 27 July. Khurshid Ahmad Khan, who was the then Delhi Police Commissioner, took part in this event's inauguration on 20 July 1947.

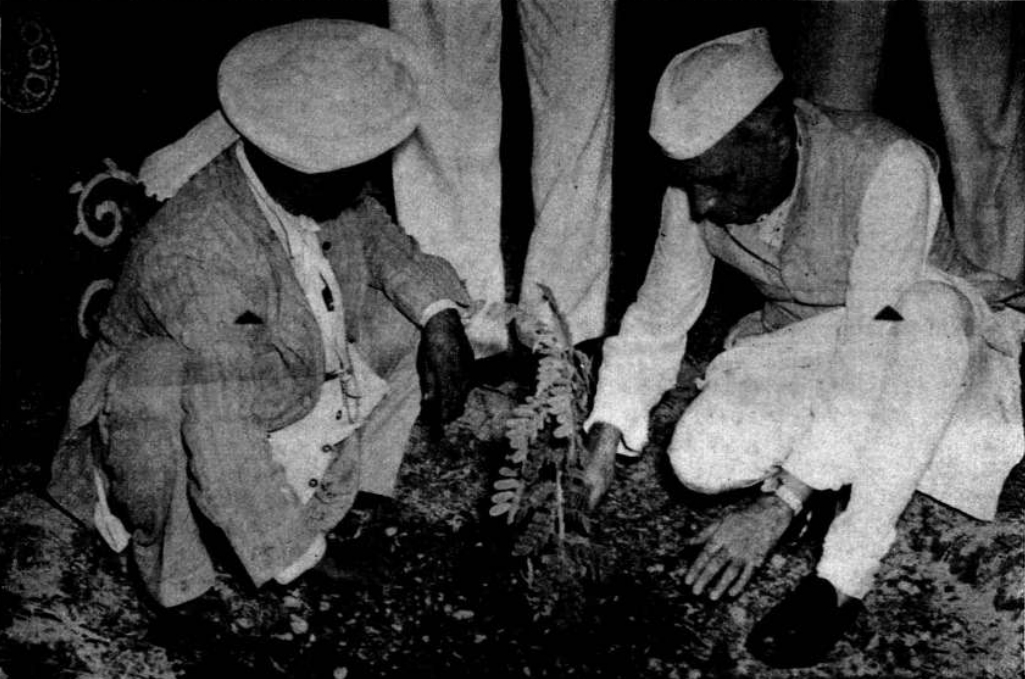
Nehru planting a tree at the Purana Qila on 20 July 1947

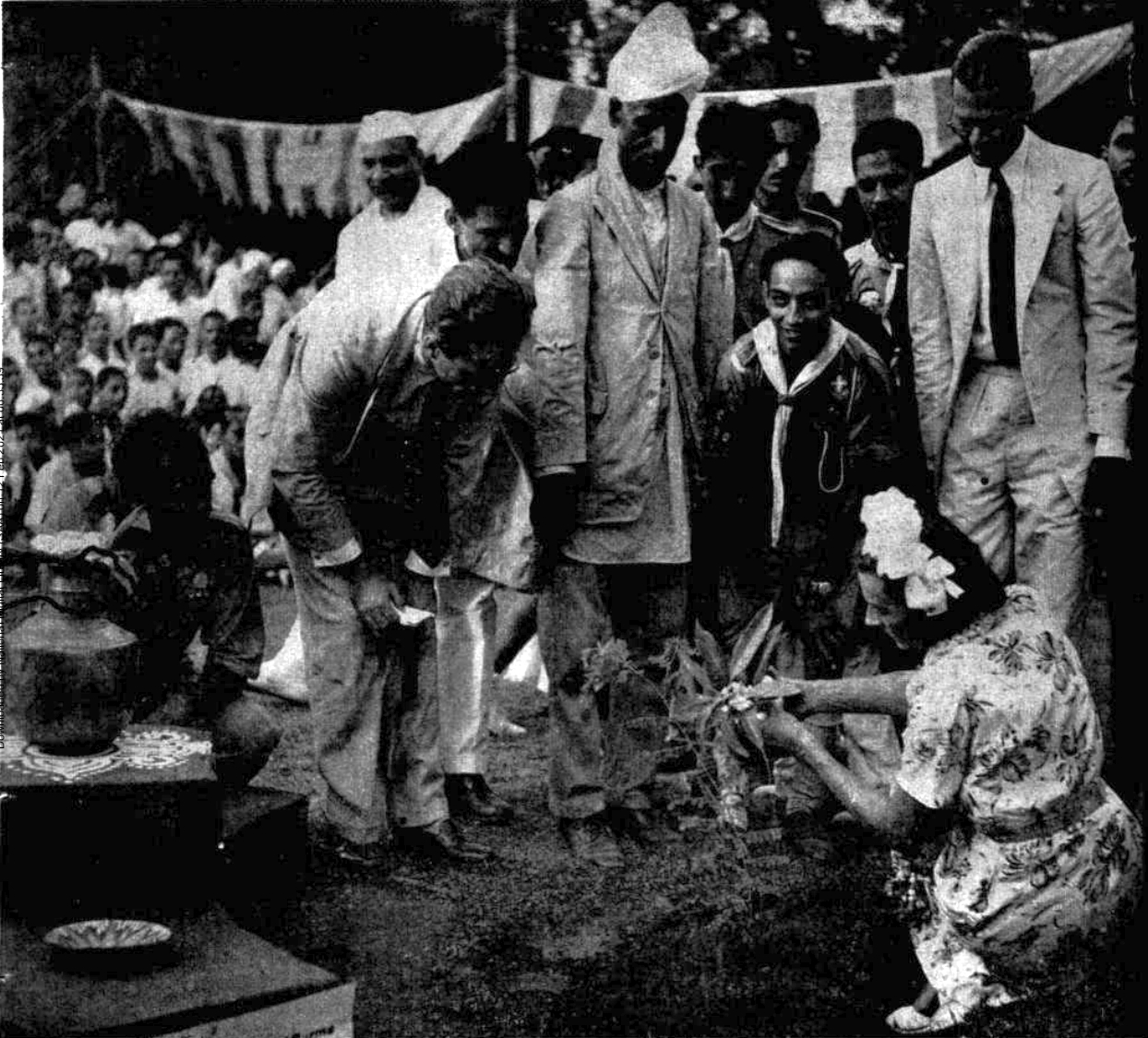
Lady Mountbatten planting a tree at Qutb Minar

=== Date and Duration ===
In India the Monsoons typically begins during the first week of July. A large number of saplings planted during this period have a greater survival rate than those planted during other months. This is one of the reasons the Van Mahotsav festival is celebrated annually between 1 July and 7 July.

== Aims ==
By encouraging Indians to support tree planting and tending, festival organizers hope to create more forests in the country. It would provide alternative fuels, increase production of food resources, create shelter-belts around fields to increase productivity, provide food and shade for cattle, offer shade and decorative landscapes, reduce drought, and help to prevent soil erosion. The first week of July is just the right time for planting trees in most parts of India since it coincides with the monsoon.

== Significance ==
Significance of Van Mahotsav festival lies mainly in its ability to promote a culture of environmental conservation and sustainable development. Following are some highlights. It motivates people and make them more aware about forest conservation and planting trees. It emphasizes the impact of deforestation in India, and helps in maintaining ecological balance while promoting environmental conservation. It also mitigates the impact of climate change, prevents soil erosion, promotes biodiversity, and improves human health. The festival also strengthens communities by providing platform for promoting afforestation and environmental awareness, and by bringing together people from different walks of life to plant trees and protect the environment. It encourages the creation and display of nature paintings and tree paintings, and many other types of paintings to showcase the beauty of nature and raise awareness about the importance of protecting it. It is crucial festival that promotes afforestation and environmental awareness. It provides a platform for people to appreciate nature through the creation of nature and canvas paintings while also educating them about the importance of preserving the environment.

=== Inspiration ===
People around the world, especially with Indian origin, celebrate the festival mainly drive by the inspiration of necessity of environmental preservation and ensuring a sustainable future for future generations. Commitment to help the environment and improve the quality of life on our planet. Celebrate the beauty and significance of trees. People from different ethnic background and religion come together and engage in community building activities, making it a significant event in the country's social calendar.

== Celebrations ==
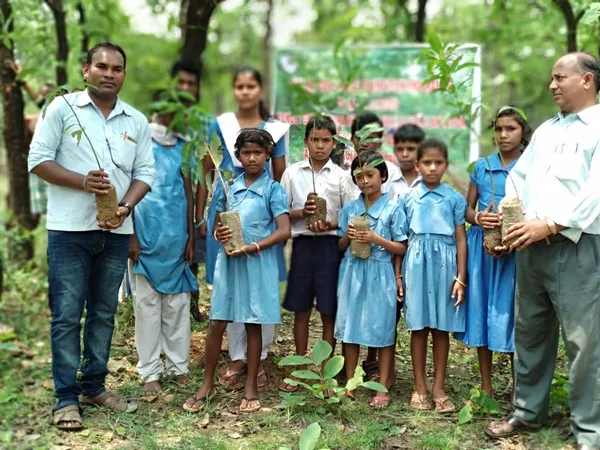
Van Mahotsav Celebration

By combining a festival with tangible policy objectives, the festival-goers get to enjoy their favorite hobby of planting trees and contribute to a better world. Renowned leaders like Jawaharlal Nehru and Dr Rajendra Prasad attended India's first-ever tree plantation drive. The Civic bodies and State Governments of India provide saplings to schools, colleges, NGOs, INGOs, and other institutions. The festival can be celebrated by planting trees or saplings in homes, offices, schools, colleges, etc. During the event, people make the best use of the platform to showcase traditional Indian handicraft items, landscape paintings of trees, and other nature paintings that highlight the beauty of nature. Through the celebration people are educated about the benefits of trees such as maintaining ecological balance, conserving biodiversity, and providing numerous economic and social benefits. Celebration Includes activities such as seminars, workshops, and rallies to spread awareness about the importance of trees and the environment. Schools, colleges, and other educational institutions celebrate by organizing various activities related to the environment and tree planting. In addition to promoting afforestation, the festival also aims to create a sense of social responsibility and encourage people to take care of the environment. Floral paintings and village paintings that showcase the beauty of nature are an essential part of Van Mahotsav celebrations, and they serve as an inspiration for people to protect the environment. Van Mahotsav has been successful in creating a positive impact on the environment, and its celebration has resulted in the increased green cover across the country. According to the India State of Forest Report (ISFR) 2023, India's total forest and tree cover stands at approximately 8,27,357 square kilometres, accounting for 25.17% of the country's total geographical area. This falls short of the 33% target set under the National Forest Policy of 1988. States such as Mizoram (84.53%), Arunachal Pradesh (79.33%), and Meghalaya (76.00%) record the highest forest cover, while states like Haryana, Punjab, and Rajasthan have the lowest. Van Mahotsav is observed during the first week of July to coincide with the onset of the southwest monsoon, as rainfall during this period significantly improves sapling survival rates. In 2024, the Government of India launched the "Ek Ped Maa Ke Naam" (Plant a Tree for Mother) campaign alongside Van Mahotsav, targeting the plantation of 100 crore trees across the country. Mass plantation drives conducted during Van Mahotsav face challenges related to sapling survival, with studies indicating that only 20 to 40 percent of planted saplings survive beyond two years due to inconsistent follow-up care and, in some cases, monoculture planting that reduces biodiversity. Environmentalists and forest officials recommend planting native species such as neem, peepal, banyan, arjun, and jamun, which are better adapted to local soil and climate conditions and provide greater ecological benefit than exotic ornamental species.

== See also ==
- Earth Day
- Arbor Day
- World Water Day
- International Day of Forests
- Greenery Day
- Timeline of environmental events
