= Pakhangba Cheng Hongba =

Pakhangba Cheng Hongba ꯄꯥꯈꯪꯕ ꯆꯦꯡ ꯍꯣꯡꯕ
- Holy and sacred symbol of traditional Meitei religion
- Nickname: Cheng Hongba
- Status: active
- Genre: Meitei festival
- Frequency: Annually
- Locations: Manipur and Mandalay
- Country: India and Myanmar
- Participants: Meitei people (especially, followers of Sanamahism)
- Major events: offering rice to deity Pakhangba
- Leader: Nongda Lairen Pakhangba
- Patron: Nongda Lairen Pakhangba

Pakhangba Cheng Hongba (ꯄꯥꯈꯪꯕ ꯆꯦꯡ ꯍꯣꯡꯕ) is a traditional ritualistic Meitei festival performed in Manipur, India, and by the Meitei people in Myanmar, dedicated to Pakhangpa and other Meitei deities. The ritual, which involves offering rice to Pakhangba, is conducted on the full moon day of the Meetei lunar month Kalen. It is observed to bring peace, prosperity, and social harmony. The ritual is conducted at various sacred sites, including Iputhou Pakhangpa Lainingkol in Mandalay and Uttra Shanglen in Sana Konung.

== History ==
The observation of Cheng Hongba, also known as Pakhangba Cheng Hongba, has been organized regularly at Sana Konung since ancient times. It is believed that the ritual has been carried down from the period of Nongda Lairen Pakhangba (c. 33 CE). The ritual is performed to bring peace and tranquility to society and involves offerings, such as rice, to the deity Pakhangba.

== In Myanmar ==
=== Iputhou Pakhangpa Lainingkol ===
In May 2024, the holy ritual of Iputhou Pakhangpa Cheng Hongba was performed at Iputhou Pakhangpa Lainingkol in Amara Pura Township, Tataley (Tadaley), Mandalay. The event was jointly organized by the Federation of Indigenous People's Democratic Movement (FIDM), Wahengbam Leikai, and Pakhangba Lainingkol, Mandalay. The ceremony was conducted under the leadership of FIDM executive member and MMDA founder member N Ngangom Moirangcha.

== In India ==
=== Uttra Shanglen in the Kangla Fort ===
On May 6, 2012, a Cheng Hongba observation was held at Uttra Shanglen. The event was organized jointly by Utra Shanglen Sana Konung and Pacha Loishang. Floral tributes were offered to Ibudhou Nongshaba, Ibudhou Pakhangba, and Yumjao Lairembi. The observation is held at Ibudhou Pakhangba Laipham, Kangla, under the aegis of the Kangla Religious Committee, Kangla Fort Board.

On May 14, 2014, the traditional ritual of Pakhangba Cheng Hongba was performed at Uttra Shanglen, Sana Konung Pakhangba Khubam, in the Royal Palace. Angom Ningthou (king) of Sana Konung, along with priests, priestesses, and hundreds of people, participated in the ceremony to bring prosperity to Manipur. The sacred site of Ibudhou Nongshaba's goddess Thonang Loicha Khembi was also worshipped during the ritual.

== Cultural participation ==
A cultural institute named Atinga performed at annual cultural and ritual programs organized by the Kangla Fort Board, including Pakhangba Cheng Hongba.

== See also ==
- Sanamahism
