= Pakhangba Temple, Uyal Cheirao Ching =

The Pakhangba Temple (ꯄꯥꯈꯪꯕ ꯂꯥꯏꯁꯪ; pakhangba laishang) at Uyal Cheirao Ching (also called Uyal Mamang Ching) is a sacred shrine located in Thoubal district, Manipur, India. It is dedicated to Ibudhou Pakhangba, a primordial deity in Meitei religion, and also houses the shrine of Ibendhou Leisana. The temple is an important place of worship for followers of Sanamahism and for local communities living around the hill.

== Location ==
The temple stands on the top of Uyal Cheirao Ching, a hill situated inside the Gwarok Reserved Forest. People from nearby villages such as Uyal, Wangbal, Kairembikhok, Wangjing, Salungpham, Heirok, Langmeithet, Icham Khunou, and others climb the hill to offer prayers to Ibudhou and Ibendhou.

== Religious significance ==
The shrine of Ibudhou Pakhangba is an important cultural and spiritual site for Meitei people. Rituals and religious ceremonies are performed at the temple by the Lai Committee every year. Sacred clothes, ritual items, boulders, and other objects kept inside the shrine hold special importance for followers of Sanamahism.

== Vandalism ==
=== Previous incidents ===
The temple has experienced earlier disturbances. In 2015, unknown miscreants dug through the temple walls and stole money kept inside.

=== 2024 vandalism ===
On the night of 21 May 2024, the temple was vandalised by unknown individuals. The damage was discovered around 5:30 a.m. on 22 May 2024 by morning joggers.

Damage Reported

According to the Lai Committee and initial police findings:

- The door of the shrine was broken.
- Sacred clothes and items—including garments of Ibudhou and Ibendhou, dakhan, kokyet, satra, thakan, mirror, phambal, charei phi, and other ritual objects—were taken outside and burned.
- The area where the deities were seated was damaged.
- Two sacred boulders inside the shrine had dents, likely from a heavy object.
- The kajenglei, a cultural ladies’ headdress, was not harmed.
- The shrines of both Ibudhou Pakhangba and Ibendhou Leisana were found desecrated.

=== Community response ===
The incident caused shock, sorrow, and anger among local residents. Community members, religious leaders, and volunteers visited the temple to assess the damage.

Statements by community leaders

- Angom Ningthou Pariton of Uttra Shanglen (Sana Konung) and Sapamcha Kangleipal, a political activist, called the day a “black day” for followers of Sanamahism.
- They urged the government to take strong steps to prevent similar incidents.
- Kangleipal appealed to the perpetrators to surrender.

Statements by the Lai Committee

- Members of the Lai Committee, including Huidrom Doren and Huidrom Dijen, expressed deep sadness. They described the act as an attempt to hurt Meitei religious sentiments and appealed to authorities to look into the matter quickly.

Organisational responses

The Federation of Indigenous People's Democratic Movement (FIDM) condemned the incident and stated that attacks on Meitei religious sites had become common. The group also requested constitutional protection for Sanamahism by giving it religious minority status.

Government and police actions

A team from Thoubal Police, led by the Officer-in-Charge, visited the site and registered a formal case. A preliminary investigation began, but the identity and motive of the miscreants remained unknown at the time.

MLA Lourembam Rameshwor Meetei

The MLA of the Keirao Assembly Constituency visited the shrine with police officials and inspected the damage. He appealed to the public not to attack religious sites and urged cooperation with the investigation. He stated that the incident was not related to the wider unrest in Manipur and provided funds for upcoming rituals scheduled for June 7. He also promised support for repairing the shrine.

Titular King Leishemba Sanajaoba

The titular king of Manipur and Member of Parliament called for a thorough investigation. He urged law enforcement authorities to identify and arrest the culprits.

=== Aftermath and public sentiment ===
The vandalism led to widespread grief among followers of Sanamahism and Meitei communities in the region. Many individuals and groups demanded stronger protection for religious sites. The event brought renewed attention to the cultural and spiritual value of the temple at Uyal Cheirao Ching.

== See also ==
- Meitei architecture
- Kongba Maru
