= Meitei architecture =

Architecture of the Meitei people

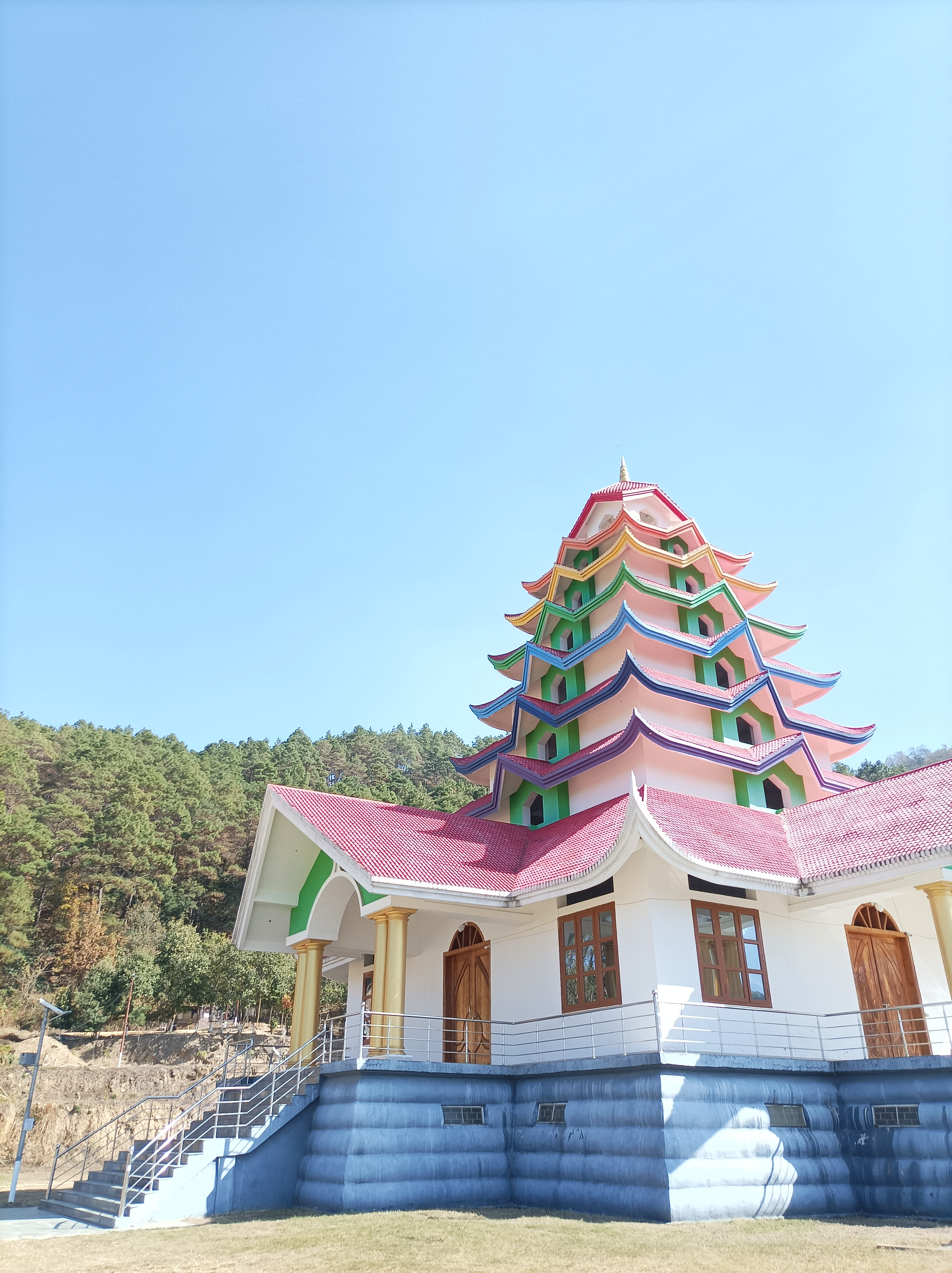
Lainingthou Sanamahi Kiyong shrine, a classic example of Meitei Laishang, with seven layers of roofs in seven colors of Yek Salai (Meitei confederacy), built on the top of the Nongmaiching Hill in Imphal East district

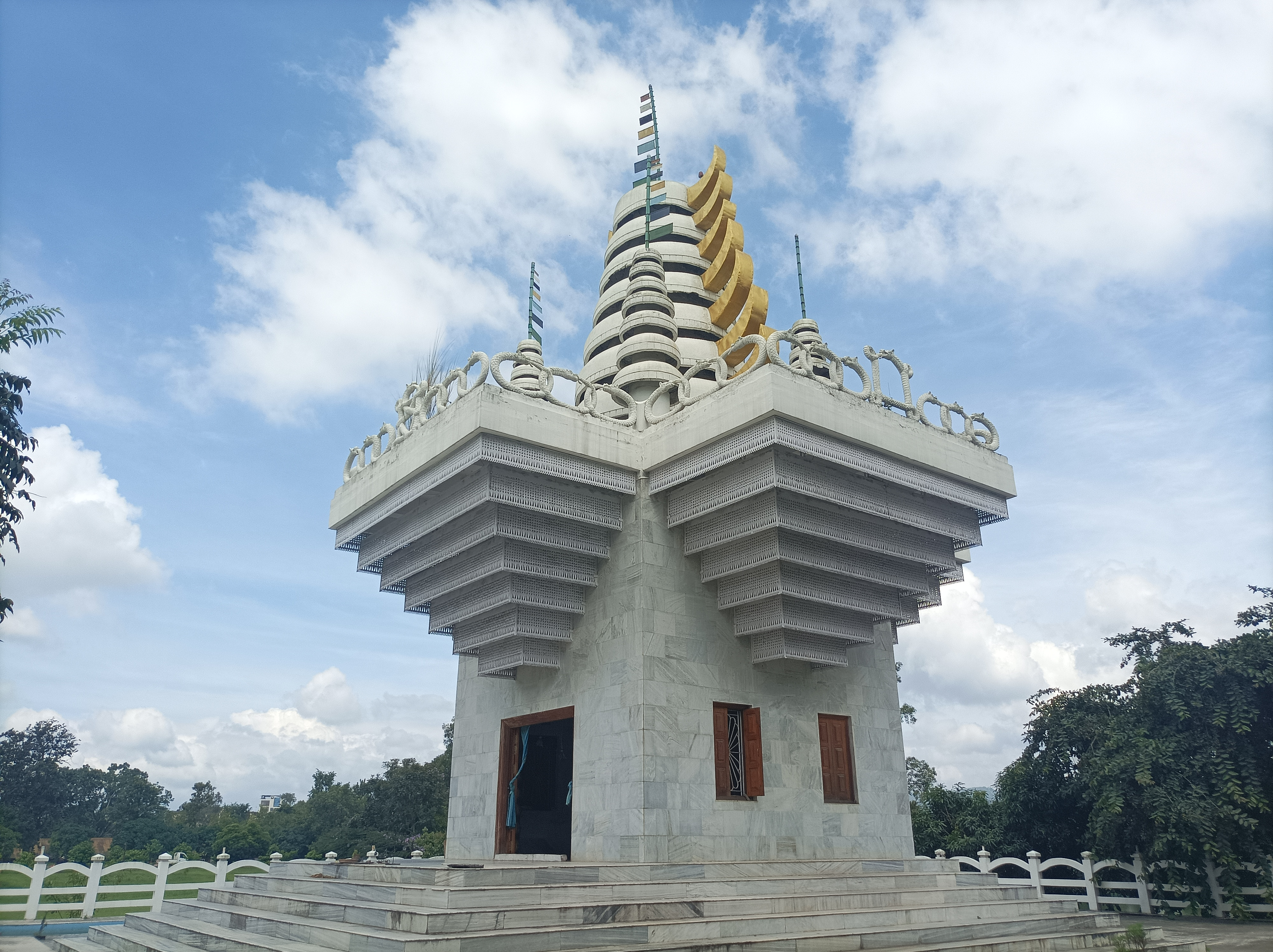
Pakhangba Temple, Kangla, an ancient Meitei temple of deity Pakhangba, restored in 2007 inside the Kangla fort, Imphal West district

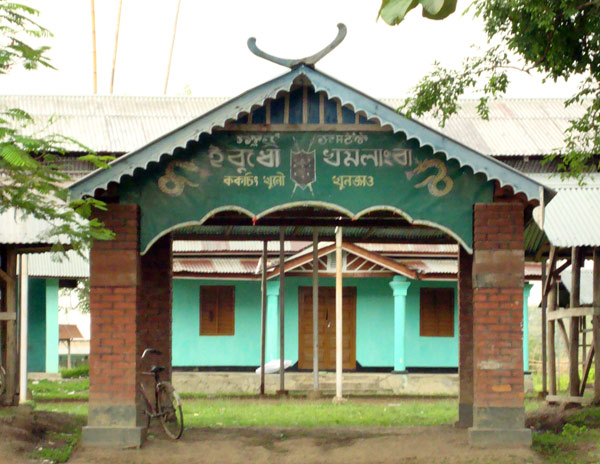
Grand gate of Shrine of Lord Khamlangba, with a holy horn in the top

Meitei architecture, sometimes also referred to as Meetei architecture or Manipuri architecture, is the architecture produced by the Meitei speaking people, whose civilisation flourished in the Kangleipak realm and its neighboring kingdoms for more than the last two millennia. It is well known for its religious buildings (Laishang, Kiyong, Thellon), found scattered in the Kangleipak (present day Manipur). Other architectural forms that are still in existence are the grand gates (Hojang), traditional houses (Yumjao), public houses (Sanglen), official buildings (Loishang), etc.

== Styles ==
Meitei-style temples and other buildings are easily distinguished by the holy Chirong (horns) at the top of the roof. Some significant examples include Hiyangthang Lairembi Temple and Sanamahi Kiyong Temple. There are also animal figures such as bulls and buffaloes carved on the walls.

== Orientation of Yumjao or Shangai Sanglen ==
In Meitei architecture, Yumjao or Shangai Sanglen are usually built to face the east. This is because the morning sunlight is less strong and helps our bodies produce Vitamin D. It also has natural properties that can kill harmful bacteria.

If the houses face north or south, the morning sunlight would be blocked by the walls. In mud houses, this could make the inside damp, which can cause bacteria to grow. Houses facing west get some sunlight, but it's less effective because of pollution in the air.

There are many benefits to facing east: (a) The morning sunlight kills bacteria, (b) it helps children get enough sunlight for Vitamin D and prevent rickets, (c) sunlight naturally enters the house, so there's no need for extra sunbathing or drying clothes, (d) the thatched roofs keep the house cool at midday, and (e) in winter, the southern wall absorbs more heat from the sun. This direction helps keep the house healthy and comfortable.

== Room Distribution ==
In traditional Meitei houses, the rooms are organized for specific purposes and family members. Some of the rooms include Naktha (women's handloom space), Mangol (verandah or waiting room), Phamen (elders’ resting place), Ningol Ka (daughter's room), Lukhum Ka or Piba Ka (son's room), Leimarel Ka (mother's room), Phamen Ka (father's room), Chakhum Ka (kitchen), and Sanamahi (family deity space). There are also areas like Kot (grain storage) behind the house.

The way these rooms are divided shows the importance of having separate spaces for different activities and people in the family. The Meitei people saw the house like a human body, with each room representing a different part of the family. Just like the body has separate areas for organs, the house had separate rooms for each family member.

This system of organizing the house shows respect for each person's privacy and individuality. It also helps each member have their own space while living together as a family.

== Thatched Roofs ==
=== Noise Reduction ===
Thatched roofs of Meitei houses are known for their ability to reduce noise pollution. Unlike concrete or metal roofs, which are poor at blocking sound, thatched roofs are made from porous materials that absorb sound effectively. This makes them an excellent choice for reducing noise in homes, such as Meitei Yumjaos (community halls), where sound insulation is important.

=== Fireproofing ===
To make thatched roofs fireproof, a layer of non-flammable material, like sand, is sometimes placed between two layers of thatch. This not only helps prevent fires but also enhances the roof's ability to absorb sound, providing both fire safety and noise reduction.

== Sanitation Systems ==
In traditional Meitei architecture, sanitation systems were characterized by the use of pit latrines, which were located at a distance from residential areas, often near bamboo groves. This distance was intended to minimize the risk of contamination to living spaces. While this layout helped in reducing the spread of pathogens, it posed challenges, especially during the rainy season, when sanitation conditions became unhygienic.

The maintenance of these latrines varied between households. Some families managed to maintain their facilities in a hygienic manner, while others faced difficulties with upkeep. Despite the issues, the placement of latrines near bamboo groves was beneficial in reducing the transmission of harmful microorganisms. However, the distance from the house made it inconvenient, particularly during odd hours.

== See also ==
- Meitei people in Assam
- Meitei people in Bangladesh
  - Meitei monuments in Bangladesh
- Meitei people in Meghalaya
- Meitei people in Myanmar
- Meitei people in Tripura
- Hiyangthang Lairembi Temple
- Lainingthou Sanamahi Kiyong
- Pakhangba Temple, Kangla
