= Kangla (disambiguation) =

The Kangla (Meitei for 'the prominent part of the dry land') a fortified palace in Manipur, India; may also refer to:

- Kangla Sanathong, Western entrance gate to the Kangla Fort
- Kangla Nongpok Thong, Eastern Gate of the Kangla Fort
- Kangla Nongpok Torban, a recreation area in the eastern boundaries of the Kangla
- Kanglā Shā (Kangla Sha), Guardian dragon lion in Meitei mythology
- Kangla Polo Ground
- Kangla Pakhangba Temple
- Kangla Museum
- Kangla Archaeological Museum
- Kangla Memento Museum
- Kangla Boatyard
