= Kangla Nongpok Thong =

Eastern Gate of the Kangla Fort

Kangla Eastern Gate
- Kangla Nongpok Thong
- Alternative names: Nongpok Thong
- Etymology: Eastern Entrance Gate of the Kangla

General information
- Status: open
- Type: Gate Bridge
- Architectural style: Meitei architecture
- Classification: Gate Bridge
- Location: Imphal River, frontier between Imphal East district and Imphal West district, Imphal, * Manipur Kingdom (historical): India (present)
- Named for: Kangla Nongpok Torban
- Renovated: 2022-23
- Demolished: 1891 Anglo Manipur War
- Client: Kangla Fort Board (KFB)
- Owner: Government of Manipur
- Affiliation: Meitei architecture

Height
- Architectural: Meitei architecture

Design and construction
- Architecture firm: Manipur Police Housing Corporation Limited (MPHC Ltd)
- Developer: Imphal Smart City Limited (ISCL) (financing agent); Manipur Police Housing Corporation Limited (MPHC Ltd) (working agent)
- Main contractor: Imphal Smart City Limited (ISCL)

The Kangla Nongpok Thong (Meitei for 'Kangla Eastern Gate'), shortly known as the Nongpok Thong (Meitei for 'Eastern Gate'), is the Eastern Gate Bridge (Note: In Meitei language (officially called Manipuri language), "Thong" (Meitei: ꯊꯣꯡ) may refer to door or bridge.) of the Kangla Fort of Imphal, Kangleipak (Meitei for 'Manipur'). With the re-opening of the modern Eastern Gate of the Kangla, the Kangla Western Gate (Meitei: Kangla Nongchup Thong) was closed forever, under the leadership of Nongthombam Biren, the then Chief Minister of Manipur, due to the traditional Meitei belief that the western gate is regarded as the gate of the dead and it is ominous to enter the Kangla through the western doorway.

== History ==
The antique Kangla Nongpok Thong was dismantled by the British Army after their victory in the Anglo-Manipur War of 1891 AD, as the Assam Rifles was stationed inside the western side of the Kangla.

== Modern re-construction ==
During June 2019, a decision to reconstruct the old Kangla Nongpok Thong was taken in a meeting session of the Kangla Fort Board (KFB) with the Manipur Chief Minister N Biren Singh in the chair inside the premises of the Kangla Fort.

The re-construction of the modern Kangla Nongpok Thong was done by the Manipur Police Housing Corporation Limited (MPHC Ltd). It was financed by the Imphal Smart City Limited (ISCL).

The timing of the reopening of the Nongpok Thong was expected to be around October of the year 2021, as planned by Chief minister Biren. But due to some reasons, it got delayed.

== Re-opening ==
On 6 January 2023, the Kangla Nongpok Thong was officially inaugurated by Amit Shah, the then Minister of Home Affairs of the Union Government of India. Later, on 10 January 2023, Government of Manipur led by Chief minister Nongthombam Biren, handed the Eastern Gate over to the public of Manipur, in the presence of Leishemba Sanajaoba, after performing a religious ritual ceremony with the help of the Maibas (Meitei for 'priests') and Maibis (Meitei for 'priestesses'). On the occasion of inauguration, Nongthombam Biren, the then Chief Minister of Manipur, said:

"I had the honor to hand over and dedicate the Nongpok Thong on the eastern side of Kangla to the public today. The bridge to restore order, peace, harmony, and prosperity in the state has finally been opened."
"We have a belief that there will be a feeling of oneness, peace, harmony, and prosperity in the state when we open the Nongpok-Thong (Eastern Gate) of Kangla. It will be remembered in the history of Manipur as the moment when the prophecy of Nongpok Thong Hangba was fulfilled."
"The opening of Kangla Nongpok Thong has a very important cultural significance. This Eastern Gate of Kangla is considered to be the pathway to peace, prosperity and happiness for the people of Manipur.
As promised we have finally opened KANGLA NONGPOK THONG."

— Nongthombam Biren

On the same occasion, Narendra Modi, the then Prime minister of India, replied to Manipur Chief Minister's speech as:

"Congrats Manipur! May the spirit of peace, prosperity and happiness be enhanced across the state."

— Narendra Modi

== Development ==
According to the plans of Manipur Chief Minister Nongthombam Biren, the Nongpok Thong will be guarded by Indian Reserve Battalion (IRB) policemen, wearing traditional Meitei uniforms, instead of modern formal ones, the Nongchup Thong (Western Kangla Gate) will be closed afterwards, vehicles will only be allowed to enter from the Northern Gate of the Kangla, the roadway from the Eastern Gate towards the office of the District collector (DC) of Imphal East district, will be made as a double lane one.

== Eviction ==
The Government of Manipur performed eviction of the illegal encroachers from the areas near the historic Kangla Nongpok Thong after its opening program. The departments concerned used heavy machinery to bring down many residential and commercial buildings built encroaching the place near the eastern-most area of the Kangla Nongpok Thong.

== Interpretation of the event ==
The incident of the reopening of the "Nongpok Thong" was mentioned in the old Meitei chronicles. In modern times, it is interpreted in many ways by many scholars. Among the various interpretations, one is that the reopening of the Nongpok Thong refers to the overturning colonial disruptions in Kangleipak (Meitei for 'Manipur'). Another interpretation is that it refers to the opening of trade relations with Myanmar and other Southeast Asian nations.

== See also ==
- Hijagang
- Iputhou Pakhangba Laishang
- Kangla Sha
- Manung Kangjeibung
- Sanggai Yumpham
