= Sanggai Yumpham =

Former royal palace in Kangla, India

- ꯁꯡꯒꯥꯏ ꯌꯨꯝꯐꯝ
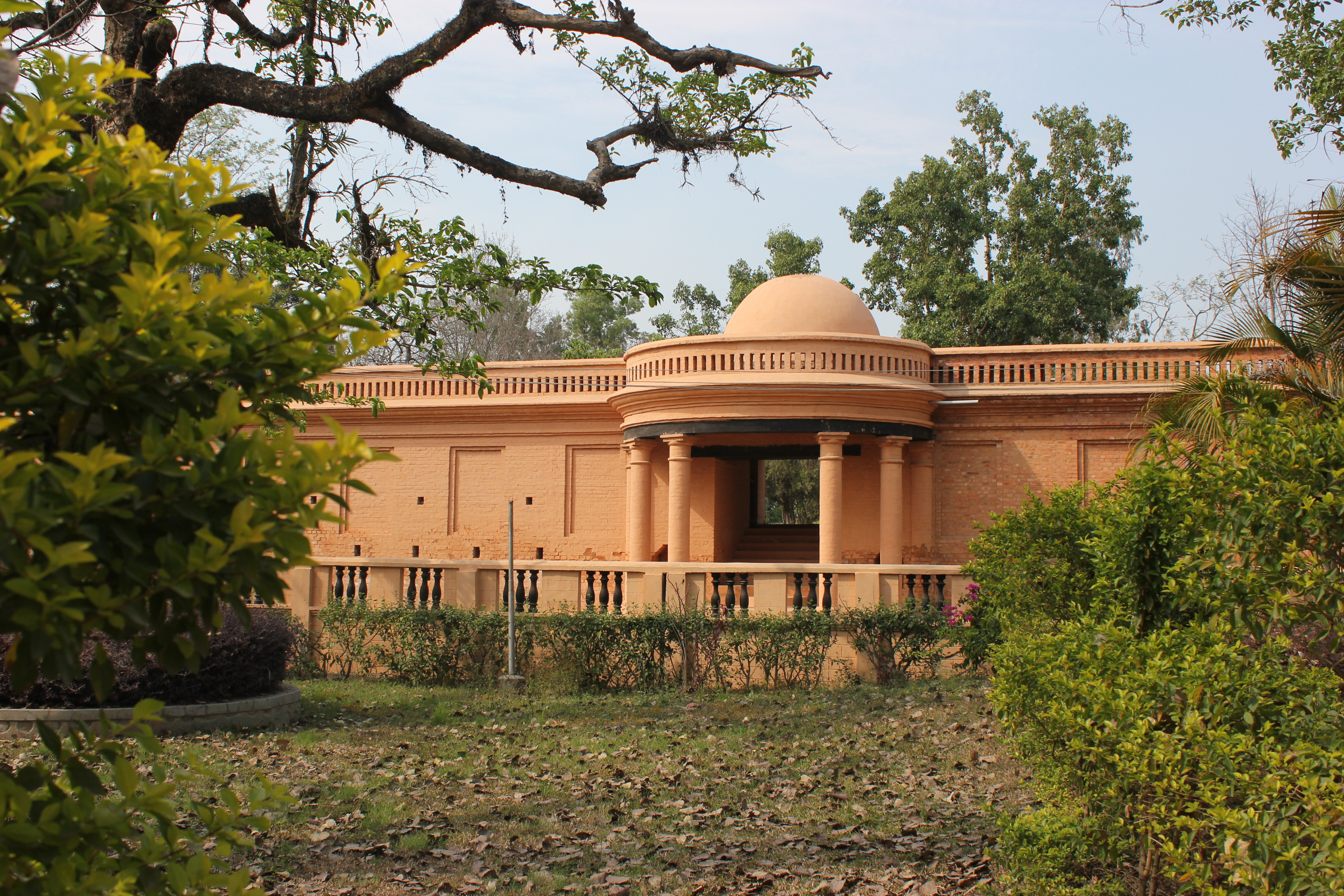
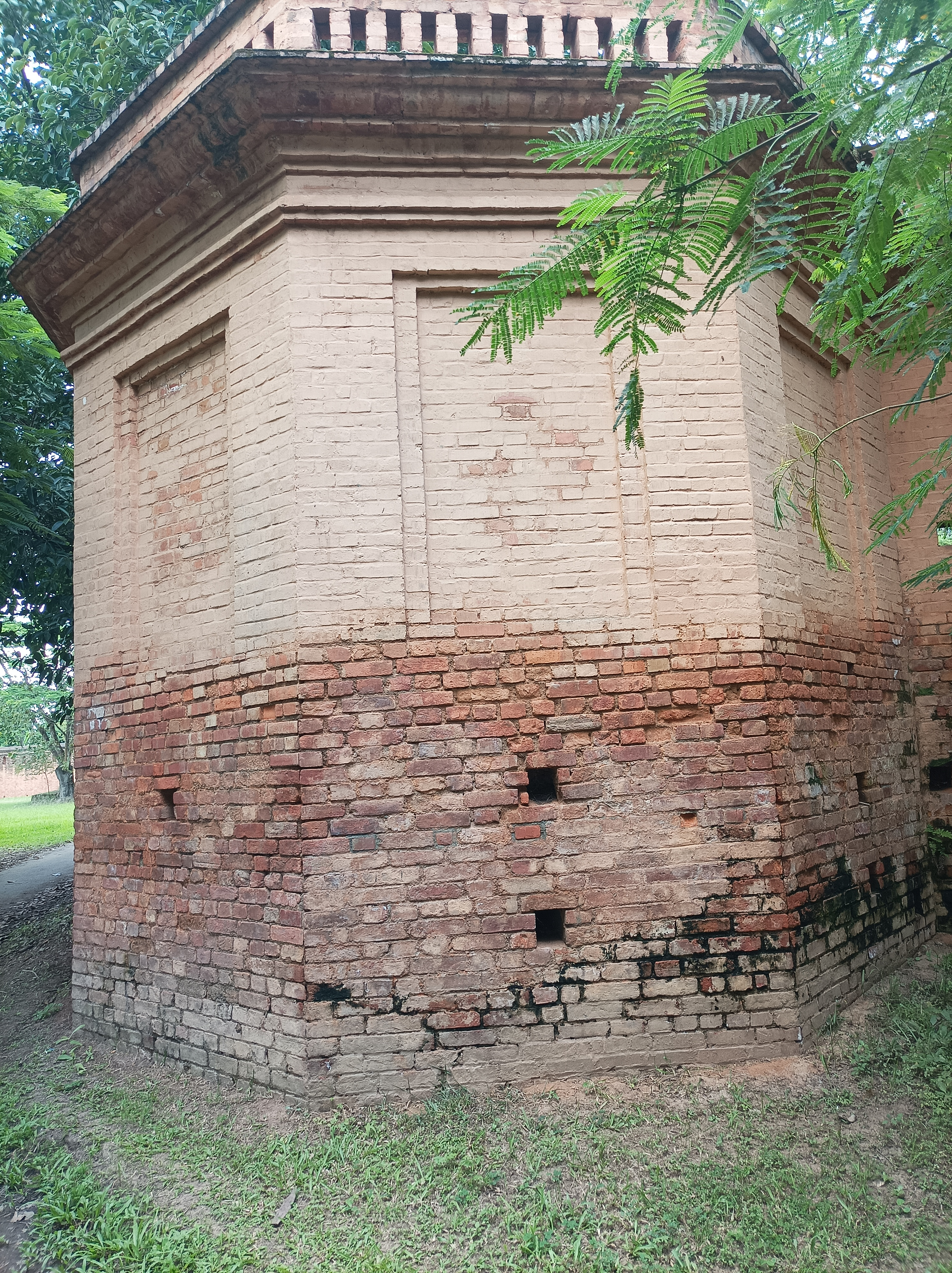
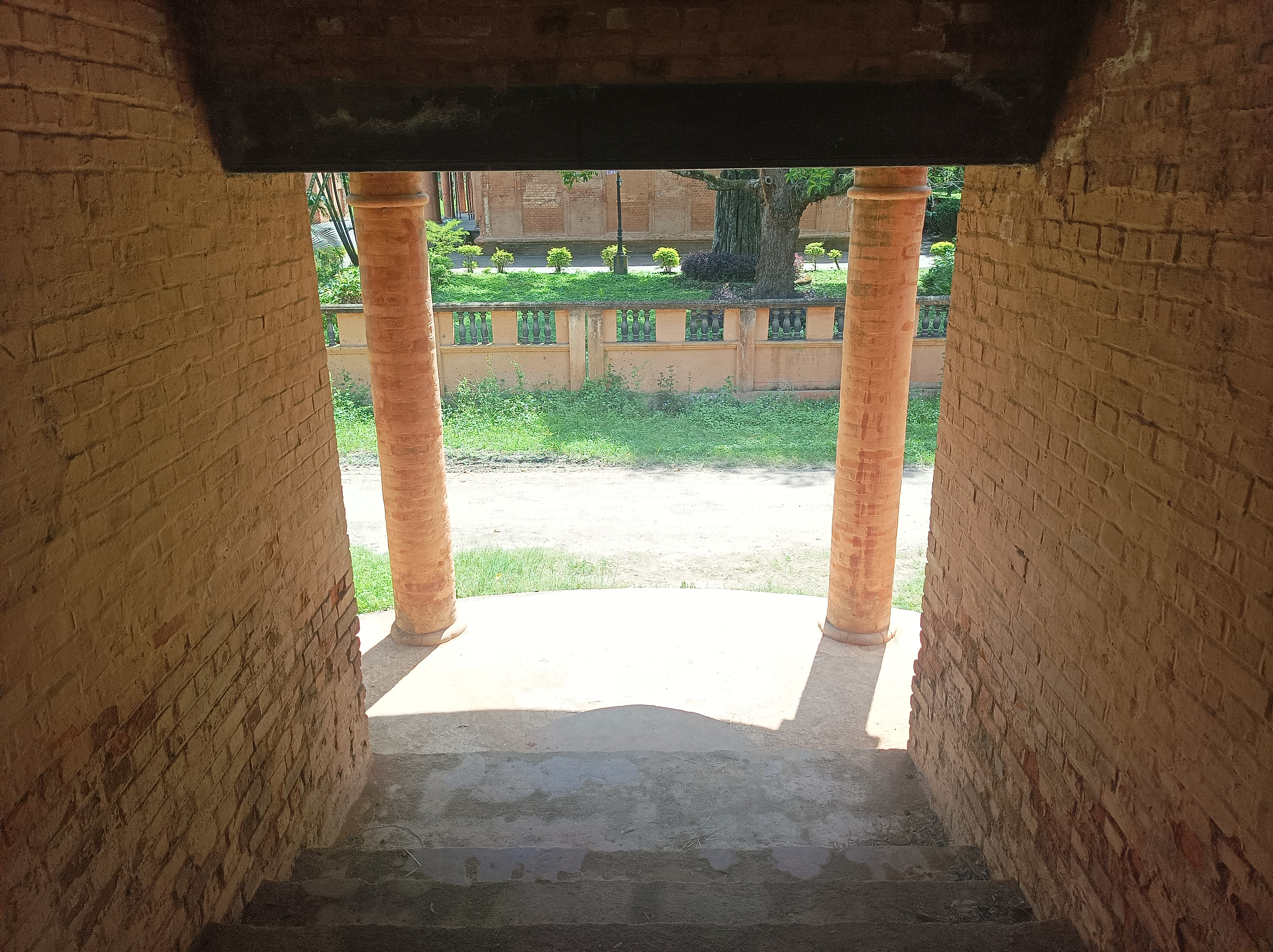
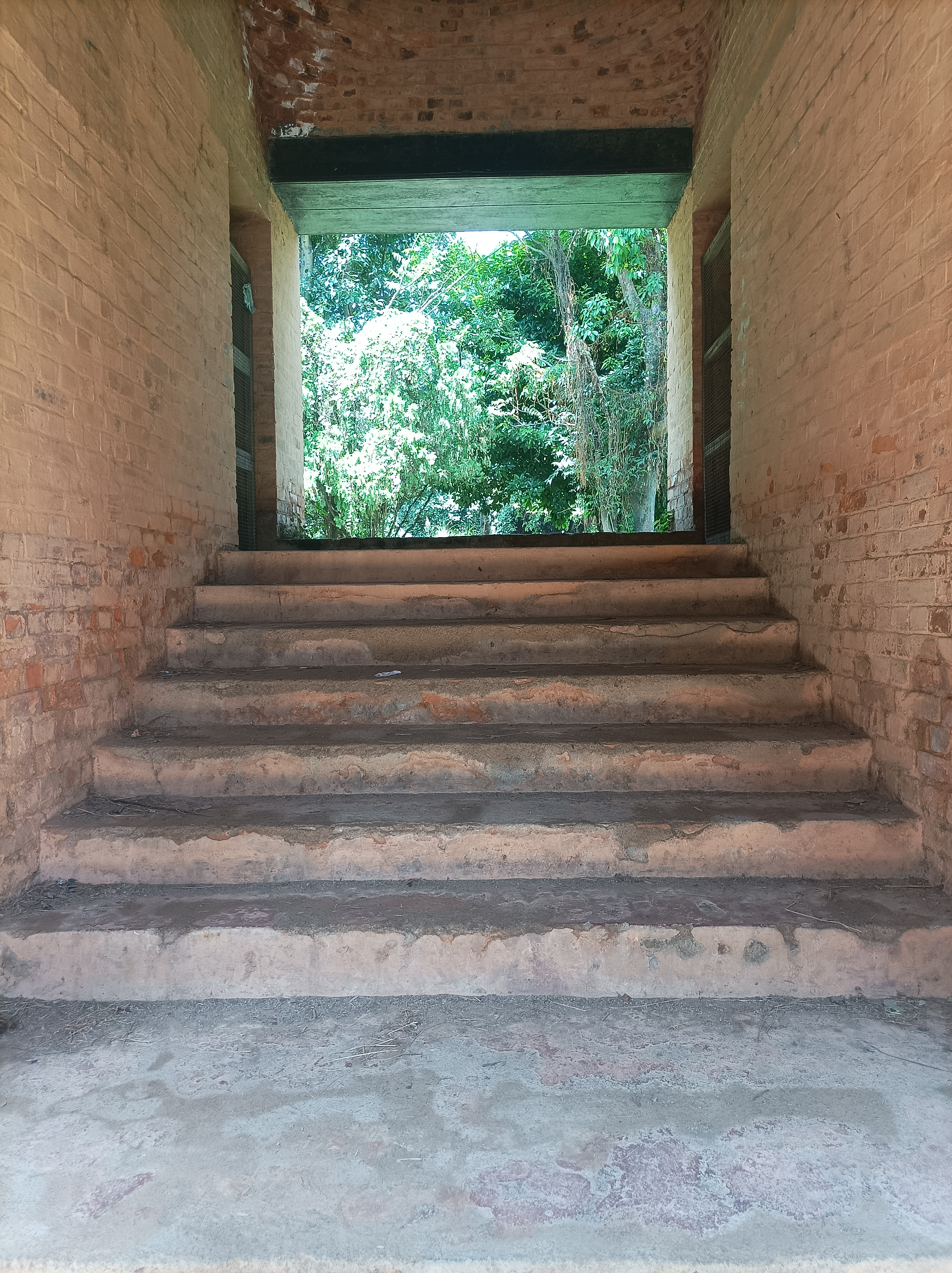
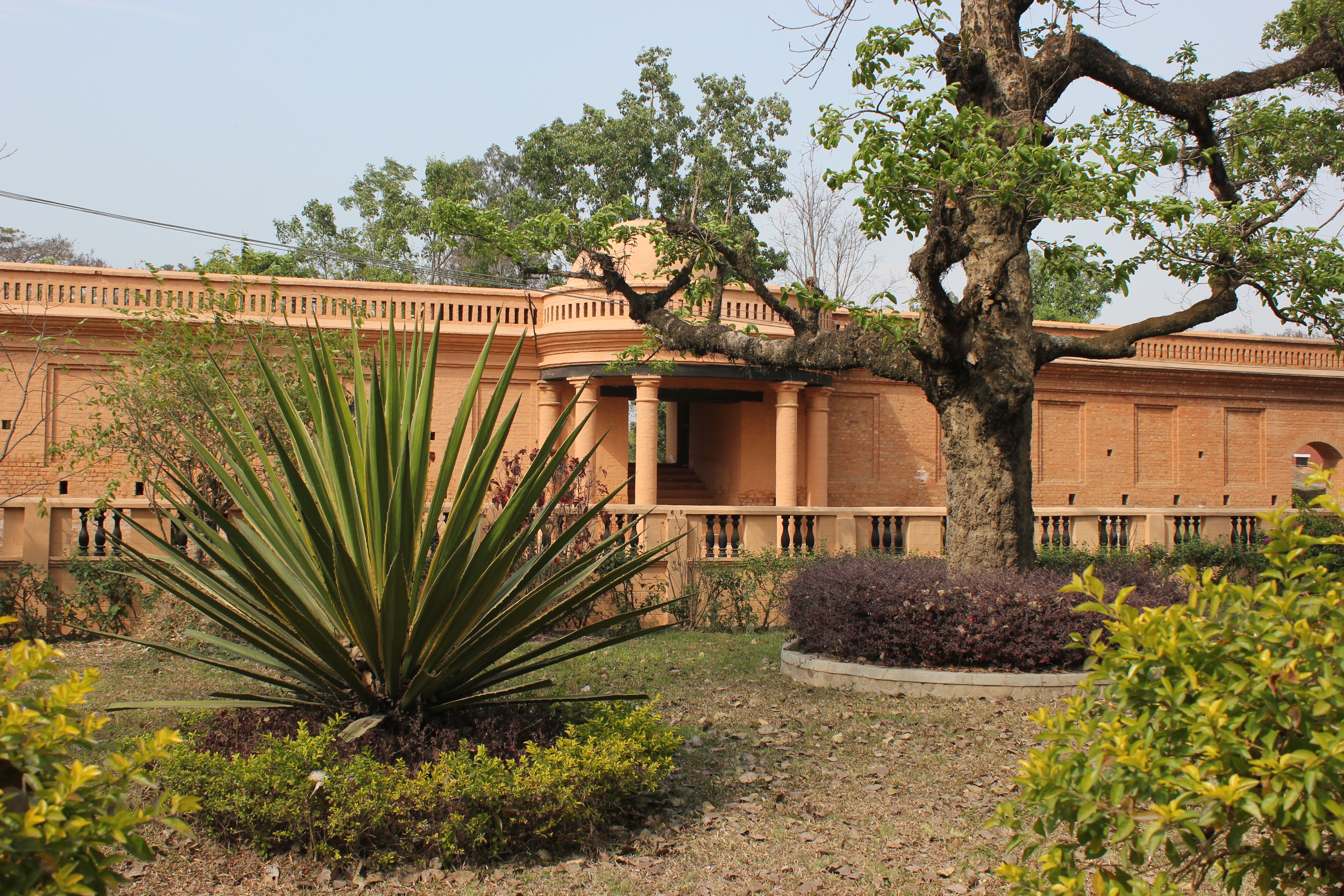
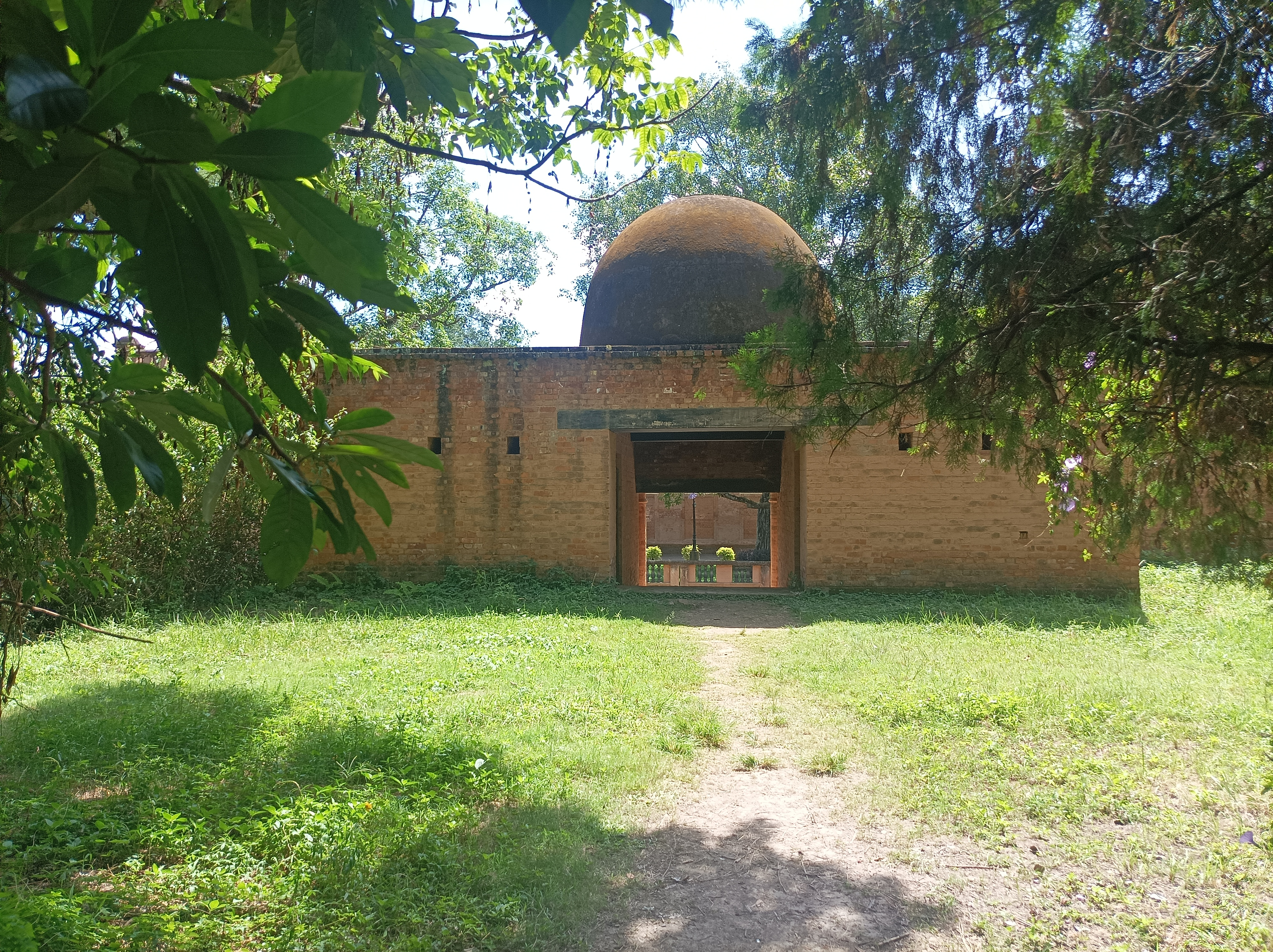
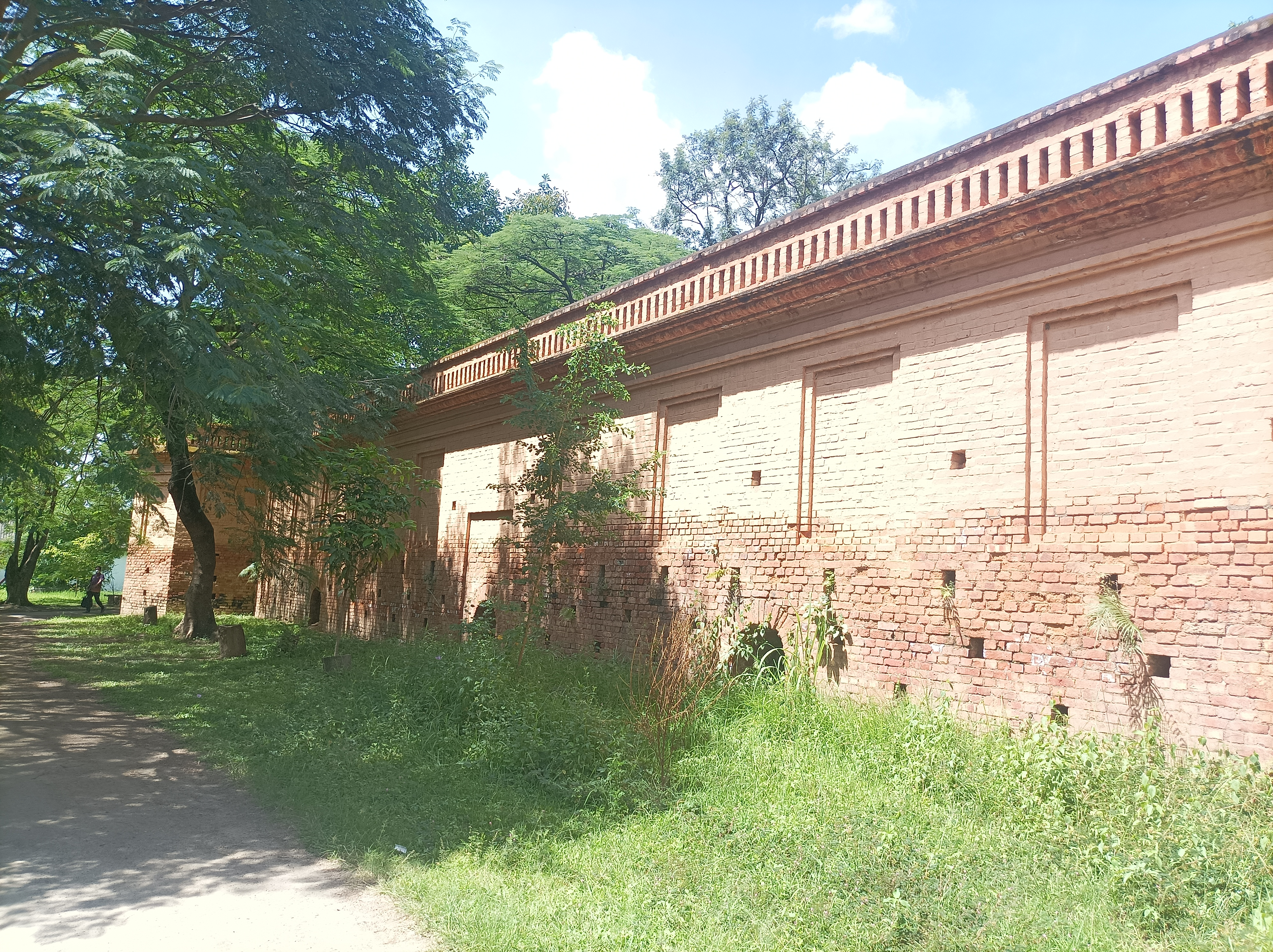
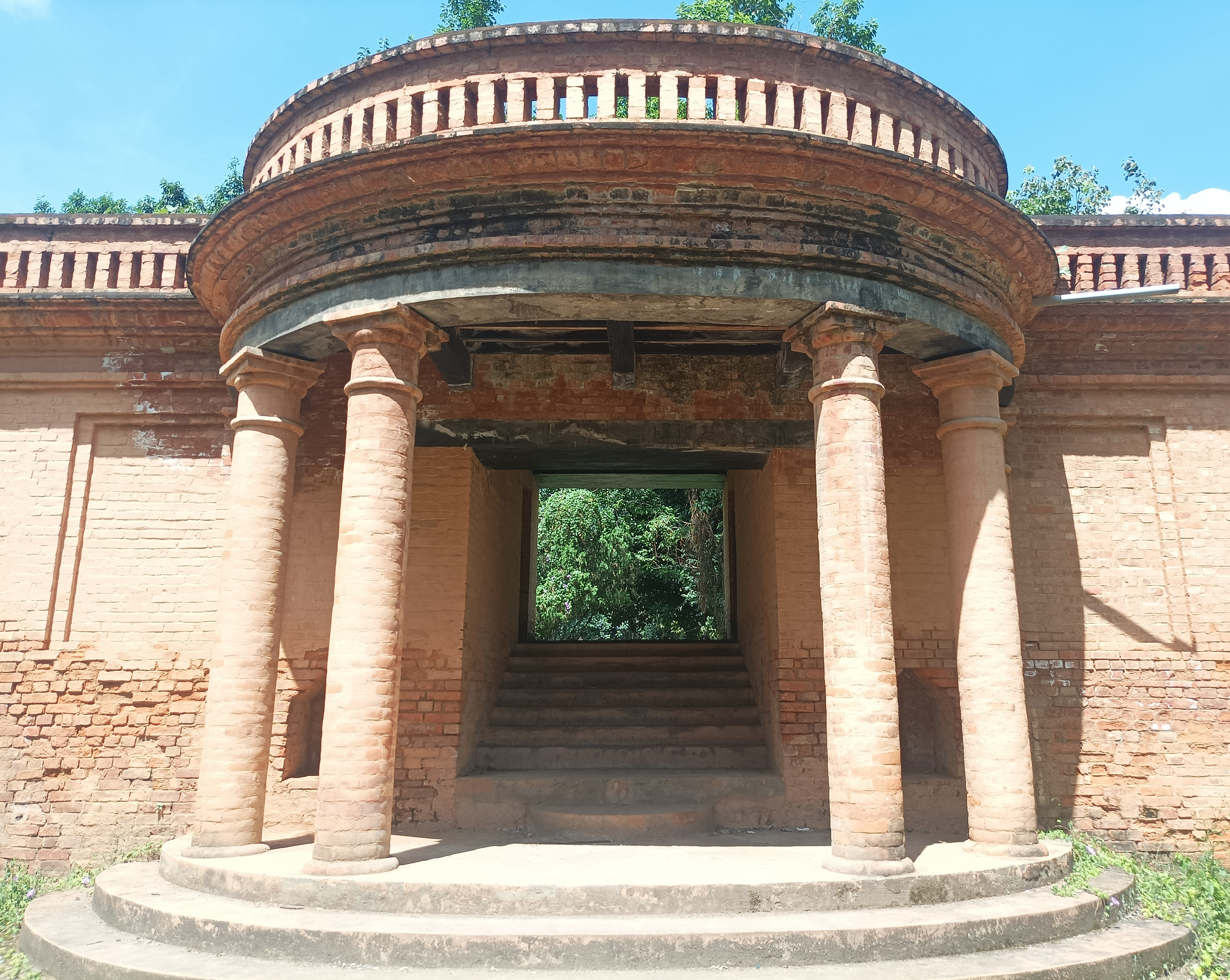
- Former names: Old Manipuri: Sangkai Empham

General information
- Status: partially demolished
- Architectural style: Meitei architecture
- Location: inside the Kangla Fort, Imphal, Manipur Kingdom
- Construction started: 1611; 415 years ago
- Demolished: 1st demolition – during the Chahi-Taret Khuntakpa; 2nd demolition – during the Anglo Manipur War on 27 April 1891
- Client: Ningthouja dynasty
- Owner: Government of Manipur
- Governing body: Kangla Fort Board

Height
- Height: 14 to 20 feet (4.3 to 6.1 m)

Technical details
- Material: brick
- Size: 600 by 600 feet (180 m × 180 m)

Other information
- Parking: no

The Sanggāi Yumpham (Meitei: ꯁꯡꯒꯥꯏ ꯌꯨꯝꯐꯝ), (Old Manipuri: Sangkai Eempham) was the citadel, a fortified royal residence within the Kangla Fort, Imphal. It is preserved as an archaeological site as well as a tourist attraction.

== History ==
The construction of the Citadel of the Kangla Fort in Imphal started in 1611, during the era of reign of King Khagemba.

The Kangla Fort was destroyed and abandoned multiple times during Burmese invasions, especially during the Chahi-Taret Khuntakpa, or Seven Years' Devastation (1819–1826). Later, the citadel was re-constructed during the reign of Chandrakirti Singh in 1873.

As a result of the Anglo Manipur War of 1891, on 27 April 1891, General Maxwell annexed the Kangla and the citadel was demolished simultaneously.

== Features ==
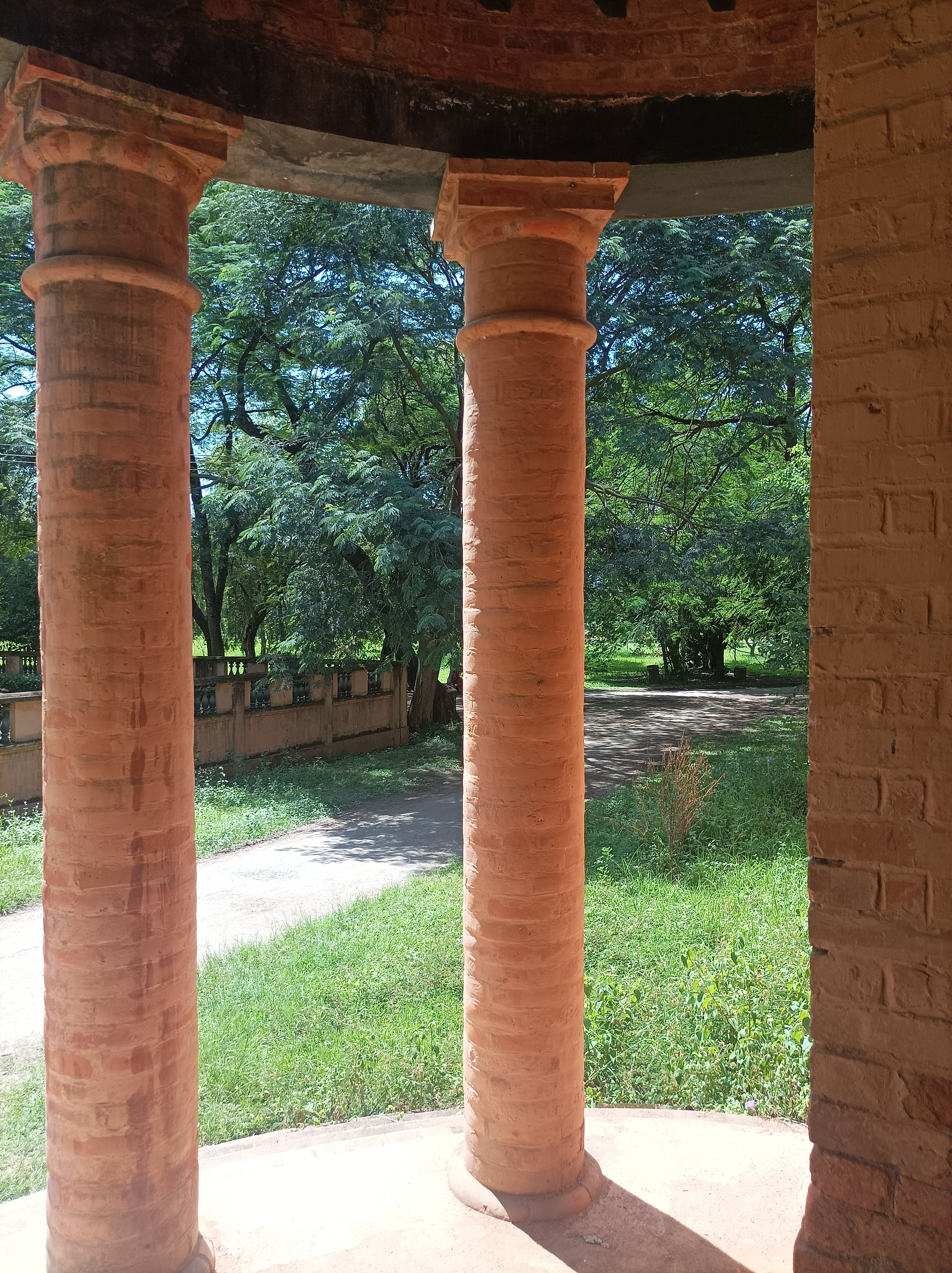
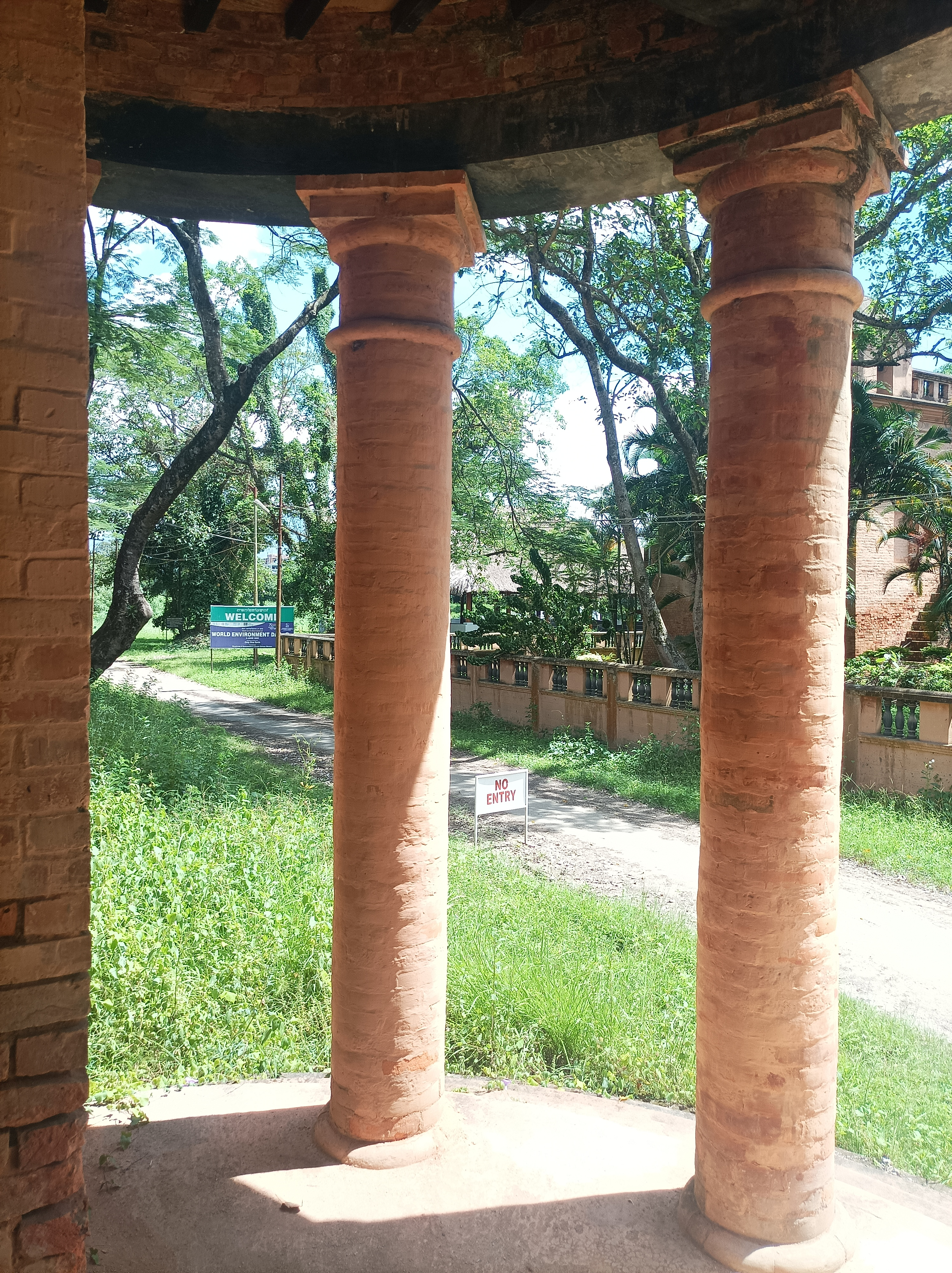
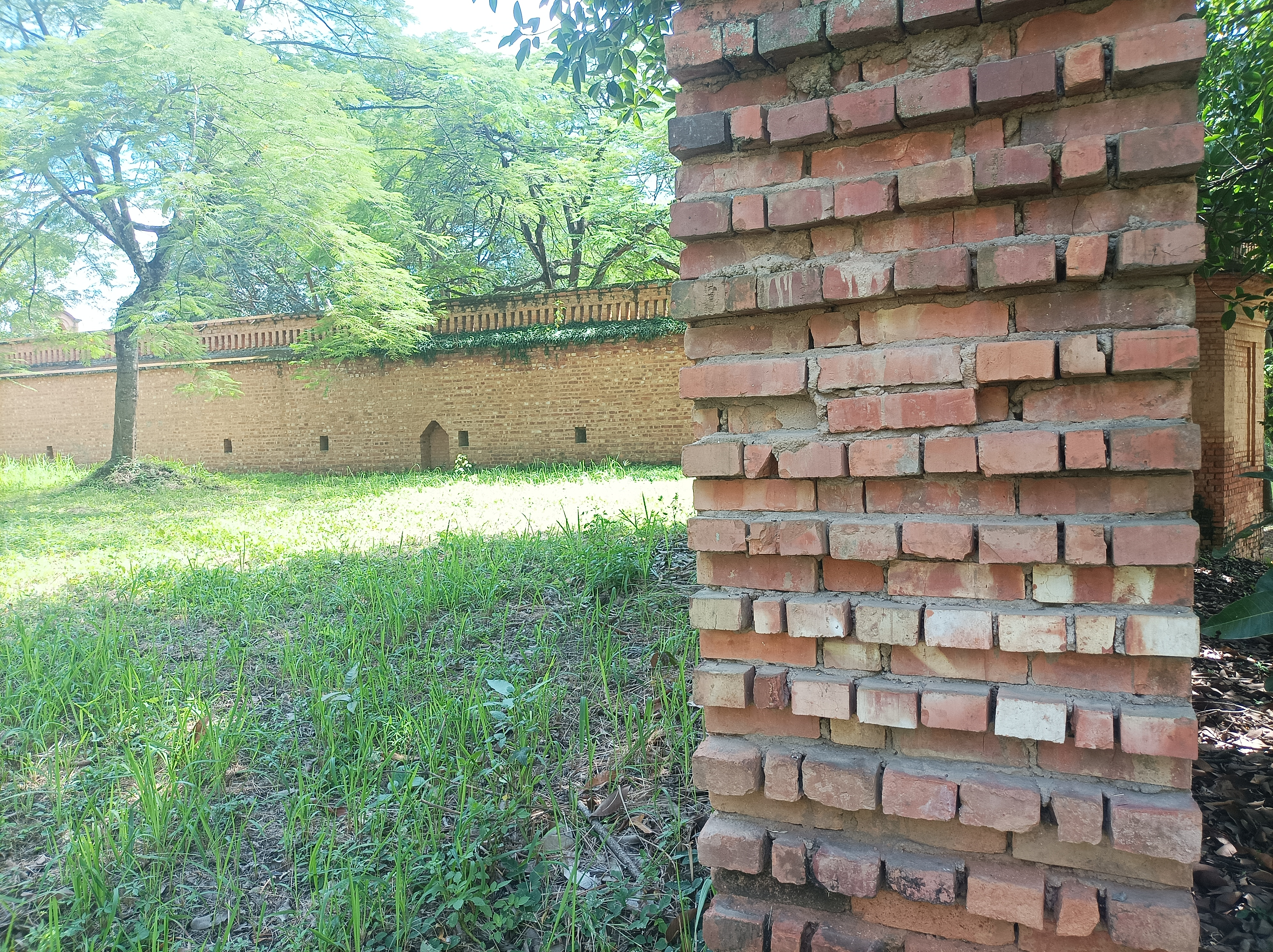
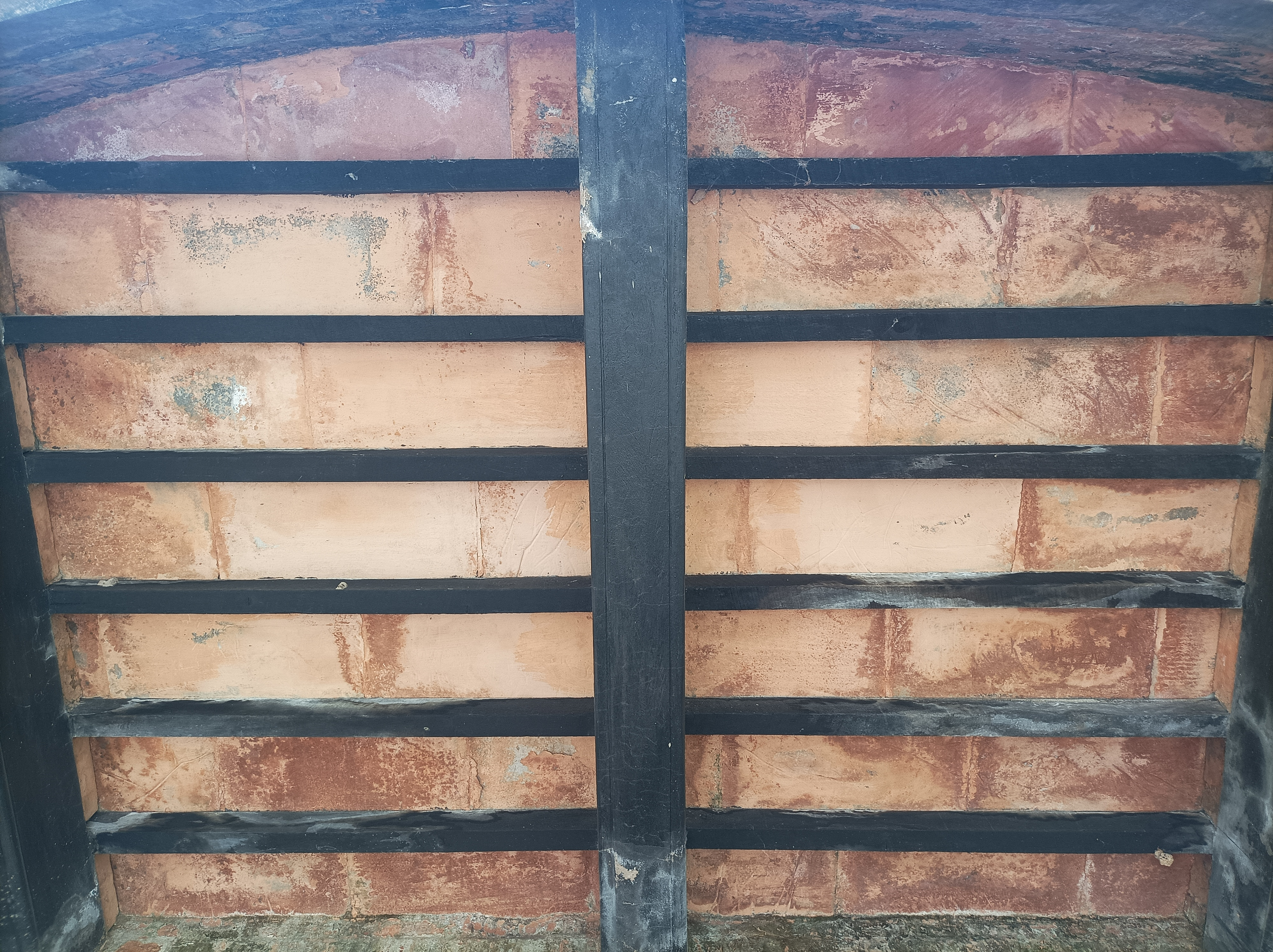
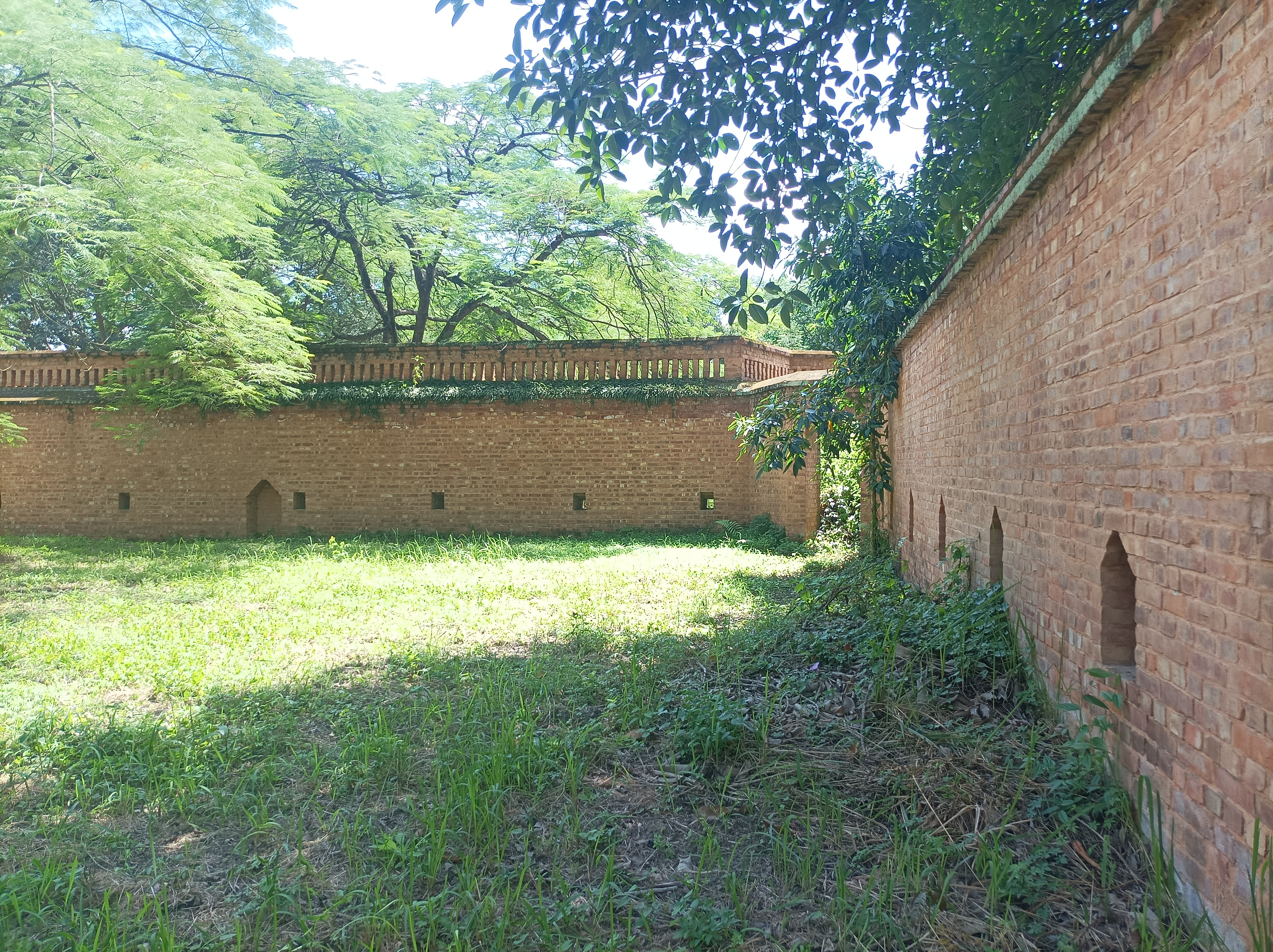

The citadel is inside the fort's inner brick wall. It measures around 600 by 600 feet (180 m × 180 m), and its walls are 14 to 20 feet (4.3 to 6.1 m) high. There are four guarding pillars in the 4 corners of 4 directions. The southern passageway door leads to the Govindajee Temple. It built of bricks. It houses many holy sites, including the coronation site of Pakhangba. (Note: It may refer to the coronation site of Meitei king Nongda Lairen Pakhangba or of divine God king Pakhangba.) It has three main entrance gates, two on the western side, one facing the Royal Coronation Hall and one facing the darbar hall, and one on the southern side that leads to a passageway to the Shree Govindajee Temple.

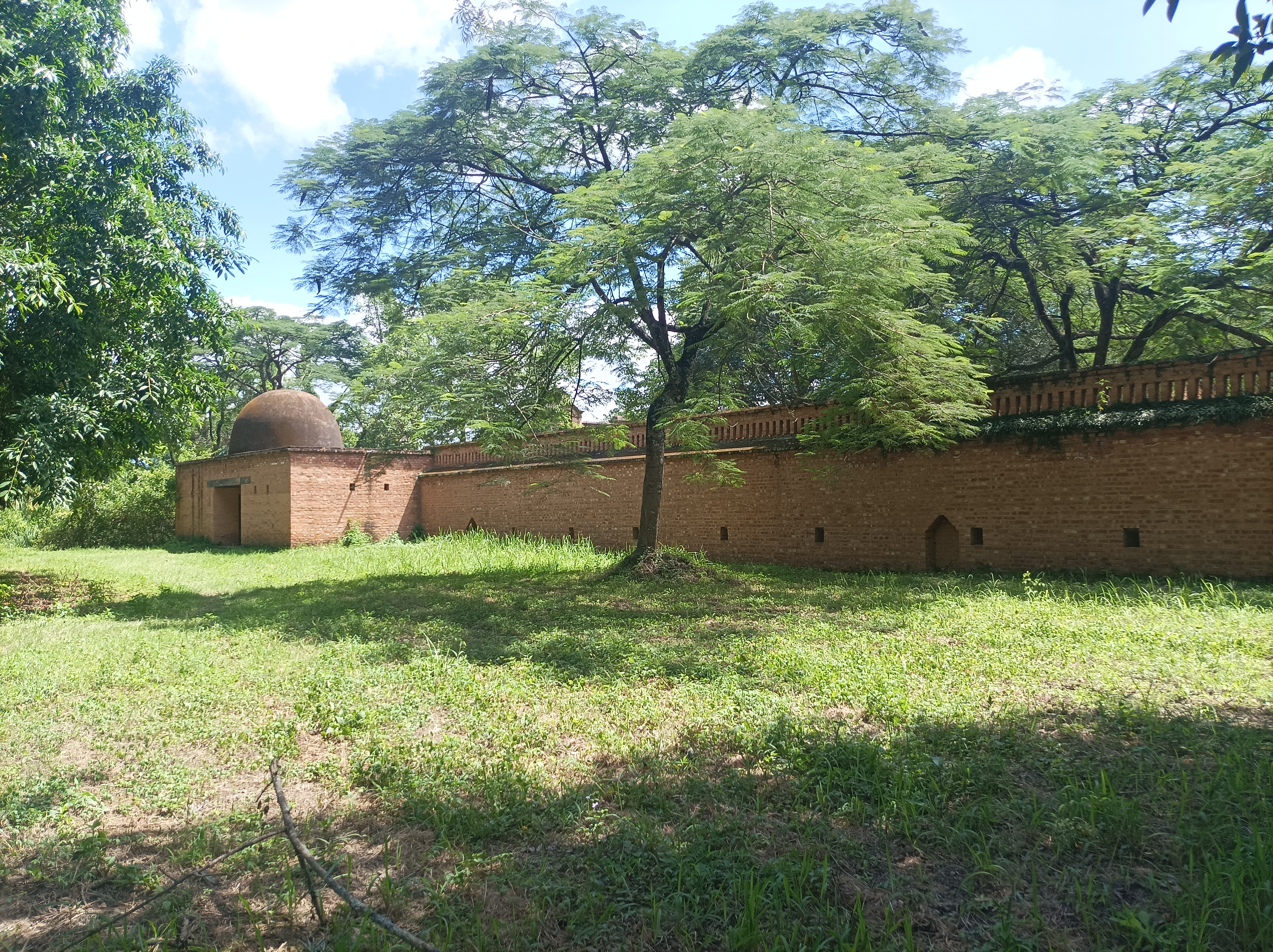
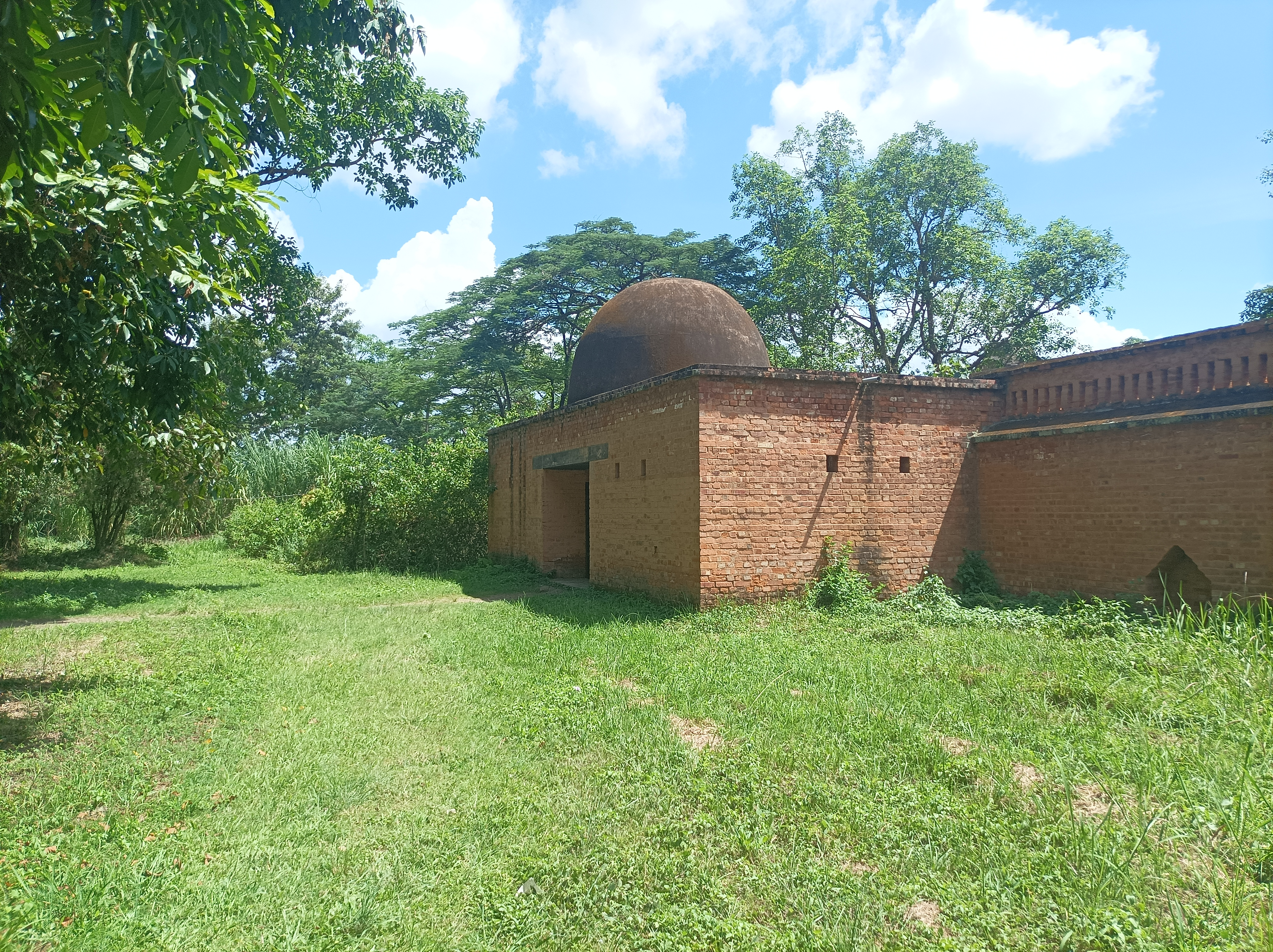
The southern exit passage way to the outside of the citadel of the Kangla Fort in Imphal. From Sanggai Yumpham, the enclosure of the citadel (royal residence), the passage way leads to the Shri Govindajee Temple and Lord Wangpulen Shrine (Sacred site of Lord Wangbren) of Kangla.

It is surrounded by five walls of the Kangla Fort. The innermost wall is the only one that is standing still today. There is one octagonal watchtower at every corner of the wall, serving as sentry posts. Its entire perimeter has military installations (emplacements) of around 500 defender soldiers.

There was an old bridge built over the Imphal River from the passageway between the Sanggai Yumpham and the Govindajee Temple inside the Kangla. Later, it got deteriorated in 1891. During the 28th meeting of the Kangla Fort Board, on 15 December 2018, Nongthombam Biren Singh, the Chief Minister of Manipur, took a decision that a new bridge will be constructed similar to the features of the old bridge.

== See also ==
- Kangla Sanathong
- Statue of Meidingu Nara Singh
- Hijagang
- Pakhangba Temple, Kangla
- Manung Kangjeibung
- Museums in Kangla
- Kangla Nongpok Torban
