= Hapta Kangjeibung =

Location in Imphal, Manipur, India

Coordinates: 24°47′58″N 93°56′49″E

Hapta Kangjeibung is one of the world's oldest polo ground, situated in Imphal, Manipur, India. It is also a main venue of Manipur's Sangai festival starting 21 November to 30 November every year.

== History ==
The term Kangjeibung means field or ground used for playing. Kangjeibung is mainly for playing Polo. There are 3 Kangjeibung in Imphal.

- Manung Kangjeibung - Kangjeibung inside Kangla Palace.
- Mapan Kangjeibung - Kangjeibung just outside, west of Kangla Palace
- Hapta Kangjeibung - Kangjeibung near present Manipur Palace.

== See also ==
- Polo
- Polo in India
