= Western Gate =

Western Gate may refer to:

- Kangla Sanathong
- Point Conception
