= Iputhou Pakhangba Laishang =

The Iputhou Pakhangba Laishang (Meitei: ꯏꯄꯨꯊꯧ ꯄꯥꯈꯪꯕ ꯂꯥꯏꯁꯪ, romanized: /ī-pū-thou pā-khang-ba lāi-sang/, lit. 'Temple of Lord Pakhangba') or the Ibudhou Pakhangba Laishang (Meitei: ꯏꯕꯨꯙꯧ ꯄꯥꯈꯪꯕ ꯂꯥꯏꯁꯪ, romanized: /ī-bū-dhou pā-khang-ba lāi-sang/) may refer to:

- Pakhangba Temple, Kangla
- Pakhangba Temple, Kakching Garden
