= Manung Kangjeibung =

Polo Ground located inside the Kangla fort in Imphal

- Old Manipuri: Manung Kangcheipung
- Inner Pologround
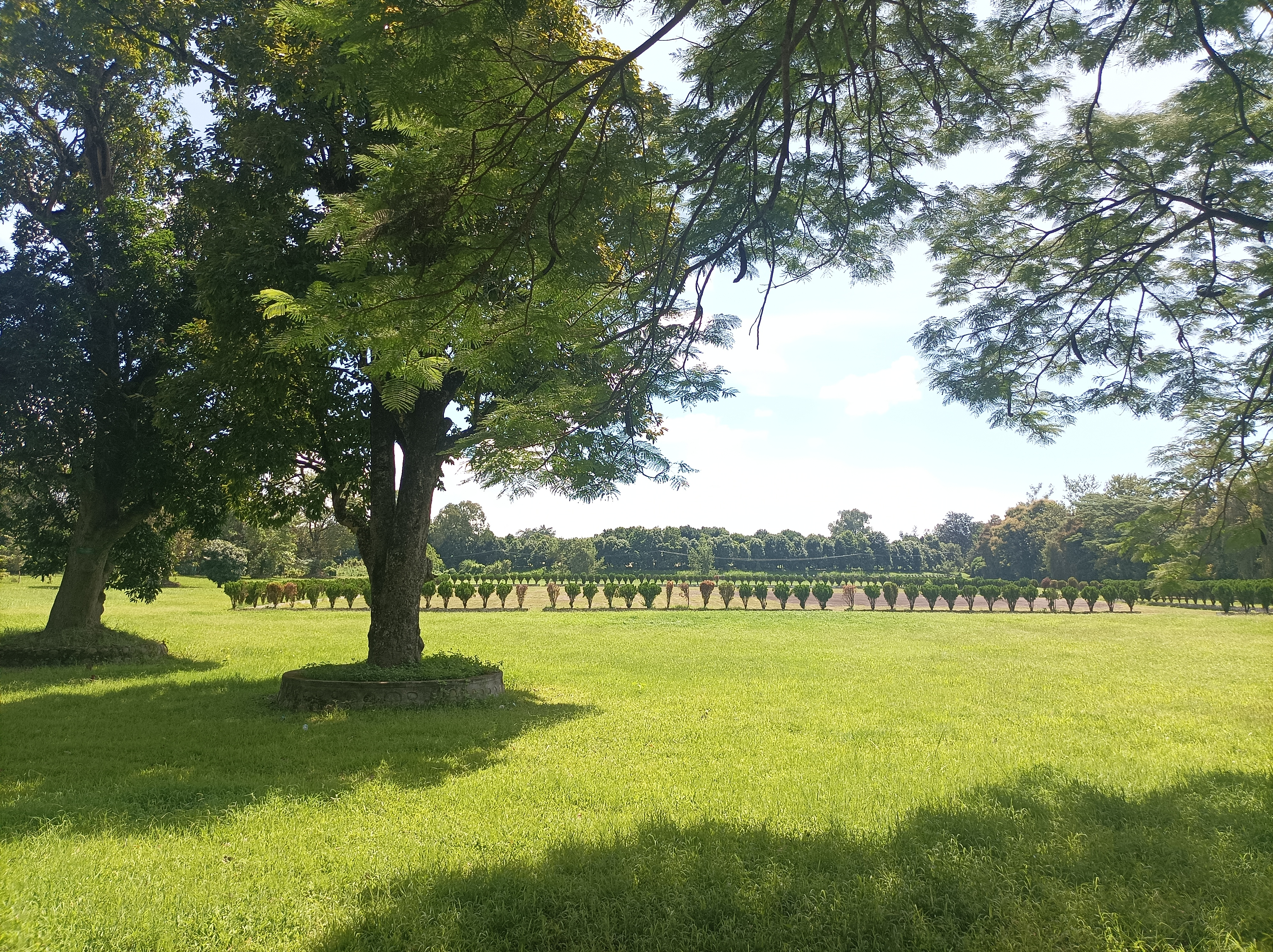
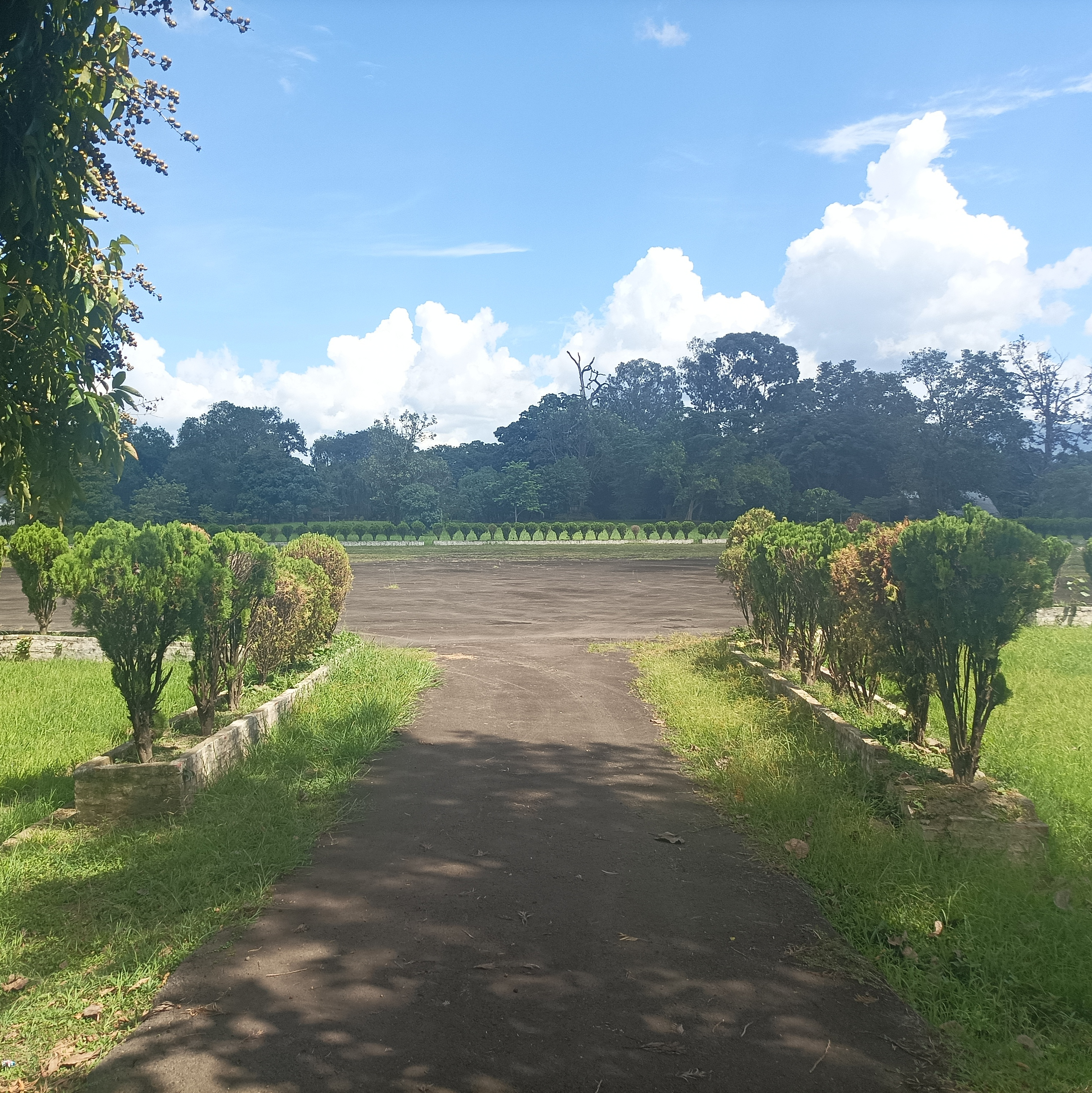
- Manung Kangjeibung, the Polo Ground of the Meitei royalties, located inside the Kangla Fort in Imphal
- Interactive map of Manung Kangjeibung
- Address: Kangla Fort, Imphal West district, Manipur; Imphal * Manipur Kingdom (historical): India (present)
- Location: Kangla Fort, Imphal West district, Manipur
- Coordinates: 24.8061°N 93.9427°E
- Owner: Ningthouja dynasty (historical); Government of Manipur (present)
- Operator: Kangla Fort Board
- Type: polo field, helipad
- Field shape: Quadrilateral

Construction
- Built: During the times of King Ningthou Kangba
- Renovated: During the reign of King Marjit Singh

The Manung Kangjeibung (Note: Since Meitei language uses both Meitei script as well as Bengali script, the Meitei and Bengali transliterations of the name "Manung Kangjeibung" are "ꯃꯅꯨꯡ ꯀꯥꯡꯖꯩꯕꯨꯡ" and "মনুং কাংজৈবুং" respectively. The Bengali transliteration of the Meitei word may or may not be different from the actual Bengali language's script usage styles.) (Old Manipuri: Manung Kangcheipung) (Manung Kangjeibung (Meitei for 'Inner Pologround')) is an old polo field located to the south west of the citadel inside the Kangla Fort in Imphal West district of Manipur. In ancient times, only royalties and nobilities were allowed to play the game of polo (Meitei: Sagol Kangjei) in this royal playground. It is one of the two most ancient pologrounds in the world, the other one being the Mapal Kangjeibung (Imphal Polo Ground).

== Etymology ==
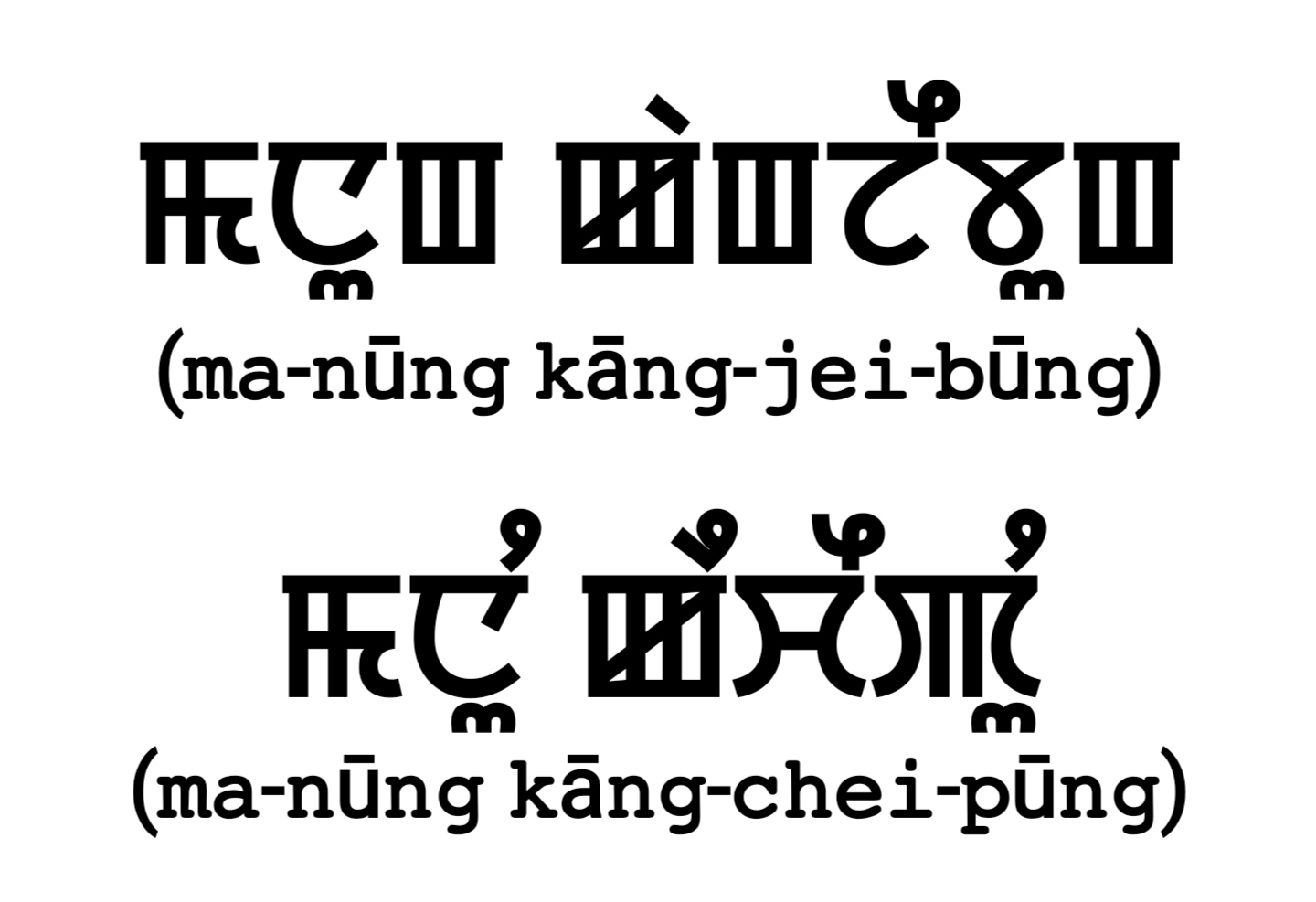
"Manung Kangjeibung" (Modern Meitei) and "Manung Kangcheipung" (Ancient Meitei) names of the Royal Polo Ground located inside the Kangla Fort of Imphal, Kangleipak (Meitei for 'Manipur')

In Meitei language (officially called Manipuri language), "manung" (Meitei: ꯃꯅꯨꯡ) means "inside" or "inner side".

The Meitei term "kāngjeibung" (Meitei: ꯀꯥꯡꯖꯩꯕꯨꯡ) means pologround (polo field). Morphologically, the word "kāng‑jei‑bung" can be divided into three roots, "kāng", "jei" and "bung", meaning "a round/spherical object", "stick" and "mound" respectively. The Meitei term for stick is originally "cei" (Meitei: ꯆꯩ).

== History ==
According to ancient Meitei manuscripts known as the PuYas, the *Manung Kangjeibung* is considered one of the oldest polo grounds in the world. Historical sources suggest that King Ningthou Kangba played the traditional Meitei form of polo, known as Meitei: Sagol Kangjei, at this ground.

The Manung Kangjeibung polo field was further developed during the reign of King Marjit Singh (1813–1819).

== Serving as a helipad ==
On 9 May 2018, Nongthombam Biren Singh, the Chief Minister of Manipur, as a chairperson in the 27th meeting of the Kangla Fort Board, had a discussion regarding the shifting of the helipad service from the "Manung Kangjeibung" pologround of the Kangla Fort complex. The discussion meeting was participated by Th. Satyabrata Singh, MLA, J. Suresh Babu, Chief Secretary, L.M. Khaute, DHP, M. Lakshmikumar, Commissioner (Art and Culture), Ng. Uttam, Director (Art and Culture), Superintendent of Archaeology Department and many others.

== Polo matches ==
According to the "All Manipur Polo Association (AMPA)", the Chief Minister's upcoming Sagol Kangjei Championship 2022 is going to be organized at the Manung Kangjeibung inside the Kangla. It is to be a part of the annual Sangai festival events.

== See also ==
- Meitei horse (Manipuri pony)
- Hapta Kangjeibung
- Iputhou Pakhangba Laisang
- Hijagang
- Kangla Sanathong
- Statue of Meidingu Nara Singh
