= Pakhangba Temple, Kangla =

Meitei temple inside the Kangla Fort

Pakhangba Laishang
- ꯄꯥꯈꯪꯕ ꯂꯥꯏꯁꯪ
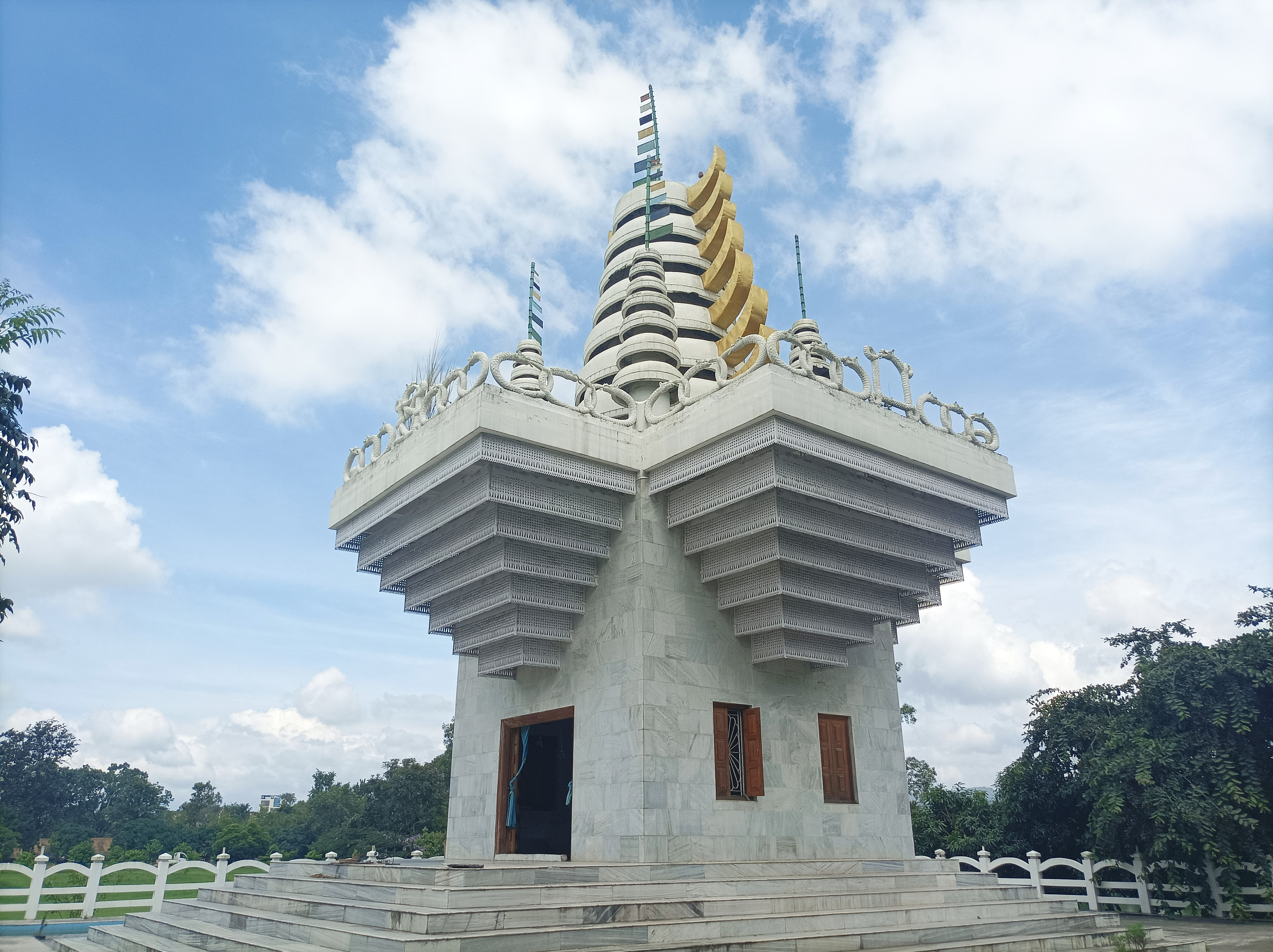
- The Temple of Pakhangba

- Location within Manipur Location within India Location within Asia

Religion
- Affiliation: Meitei religion (Sanamahism)
- Sect: Pakhangba worship
- District: Imphal West district
- Province: Manipur
- Region: Northeast India
- Deity: Pakhangba
- Festivals: Mera Chaorel Houba, Mera Hou Chongba, Pakhangba Cheng Hongba, etc.
- Ownership: Government of Manipur
- Governing body: Kangla Fort Board, Government of Manipur
- Leadership: Kangla Fort Board
- Patron: Government of Manipur

Location
- Location: Kangla Fort, Imphal West district, Manipur
- State: Manipur
- Country: India
- Administration: Government of Manipur
- Coordinates: 24.80823°N 93.94203°E

Architecture
- Style: Meitei architecture
- Creator: Unknown (for the previous historical structure); Manipur Police Housing Corporation Limited (for the present reconstructed structure)
- Funded by: Government of Manipur
- Completed: Unknown (for the previous historical structure); 2010 (for the present reconstructed structure)

Specifications
- Height (max): 48 feet (15 m)
- Dome: 1
- Minaret: 1
- Spire: 1
- Site area: Kangla Fort
- Temple: 1
- Monument: 1
- Shrine: 1
- Elevation: 48 ft (15 m)

The Pakhangba Temple, also known as the Pakhangba Laishang (Meitei: ꯄꯥꯈꯪꯕ ꯂꯥꯏꯁꯪ, lit. 'Temple of God Pakhangba'), is a Meitei temple dedicated to the God Pakhangba of Sanamahism, the traditional Meitei religion, located beside the Nungseng Eekon, to the left side of the Kangla Sanathong, the western gate of the Kangla Fort in the Imphal West district of Manipur.

== Construction ==
The recently constructed Iputhou Pakhangba Laisang temple is an example of Meitei architecture. It is located in the grounds of Kangla Palace. The construction was carried out by the "Manipur Police Housing Corporation Limited" under the aegis of the "Kangla Fort Board" between December 2008 and January 2010.

On 19 February 2010, along with the performance of religious rites and rituals by the maibas (Meitei for 'priests') and the maibis (Meitei for 'priestesses') invoking God Pakhangba at Nungjeng Pukhri Macha, the Pakhangba Temple was consecrated along with a Hiyang Hiren (royal boat) by Ph. Parijat, the then Health and Family Welfare Minister of Manipur Government. There was also religious procession with priestesses offering Maibi Jagoi to the music of the pena from the Nungjeng Pukhri Macha to the temple.

During the inaugural event, Dr. Kh. Sorojini, the then Director of the Manipur Art and Culture Department, said that the re-construction of the temple of God Pakhangba and the re-installation of the Hiyang Hiren was a long cherished desire of the public.

== Features and architectural designs ==
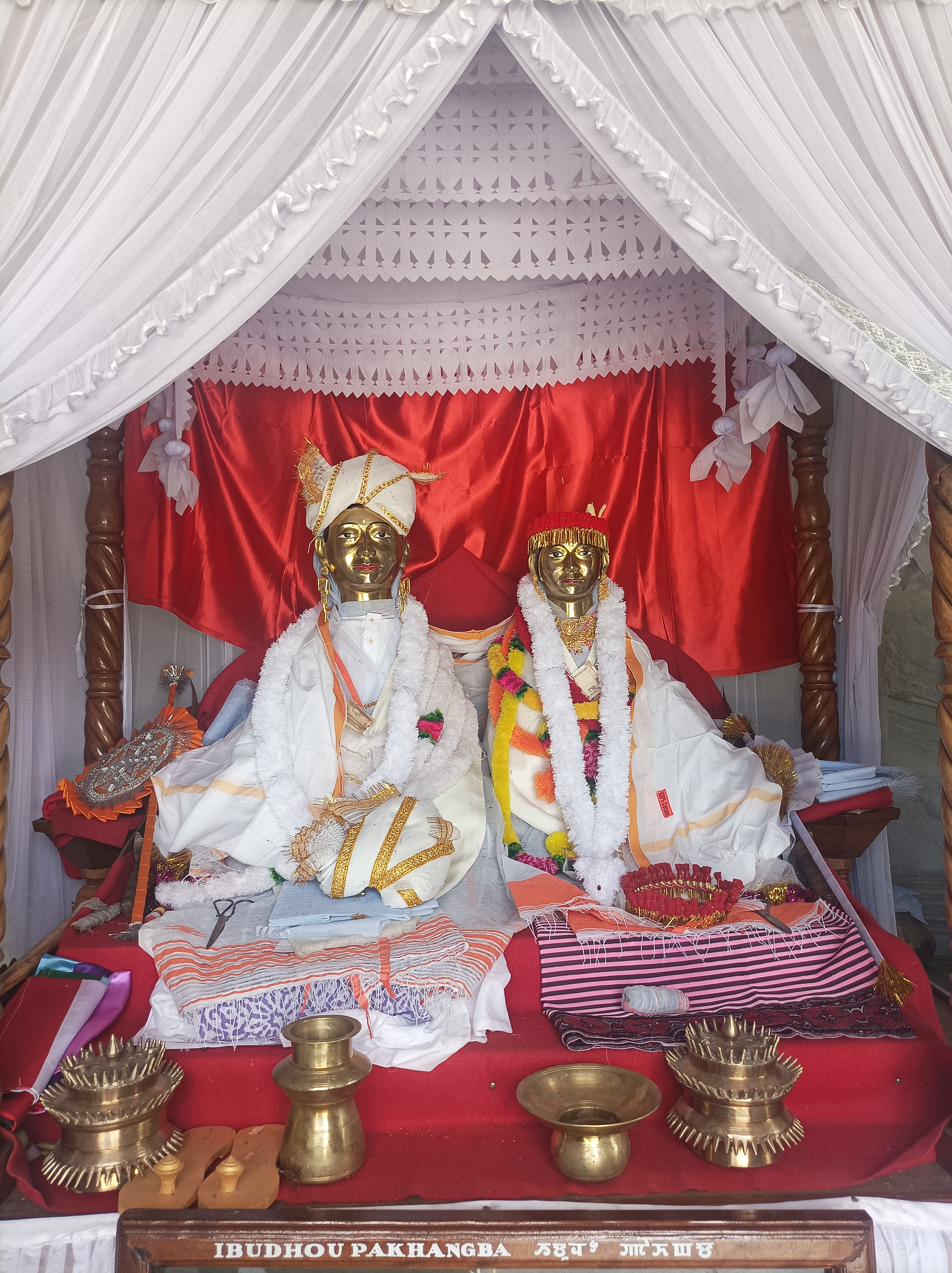
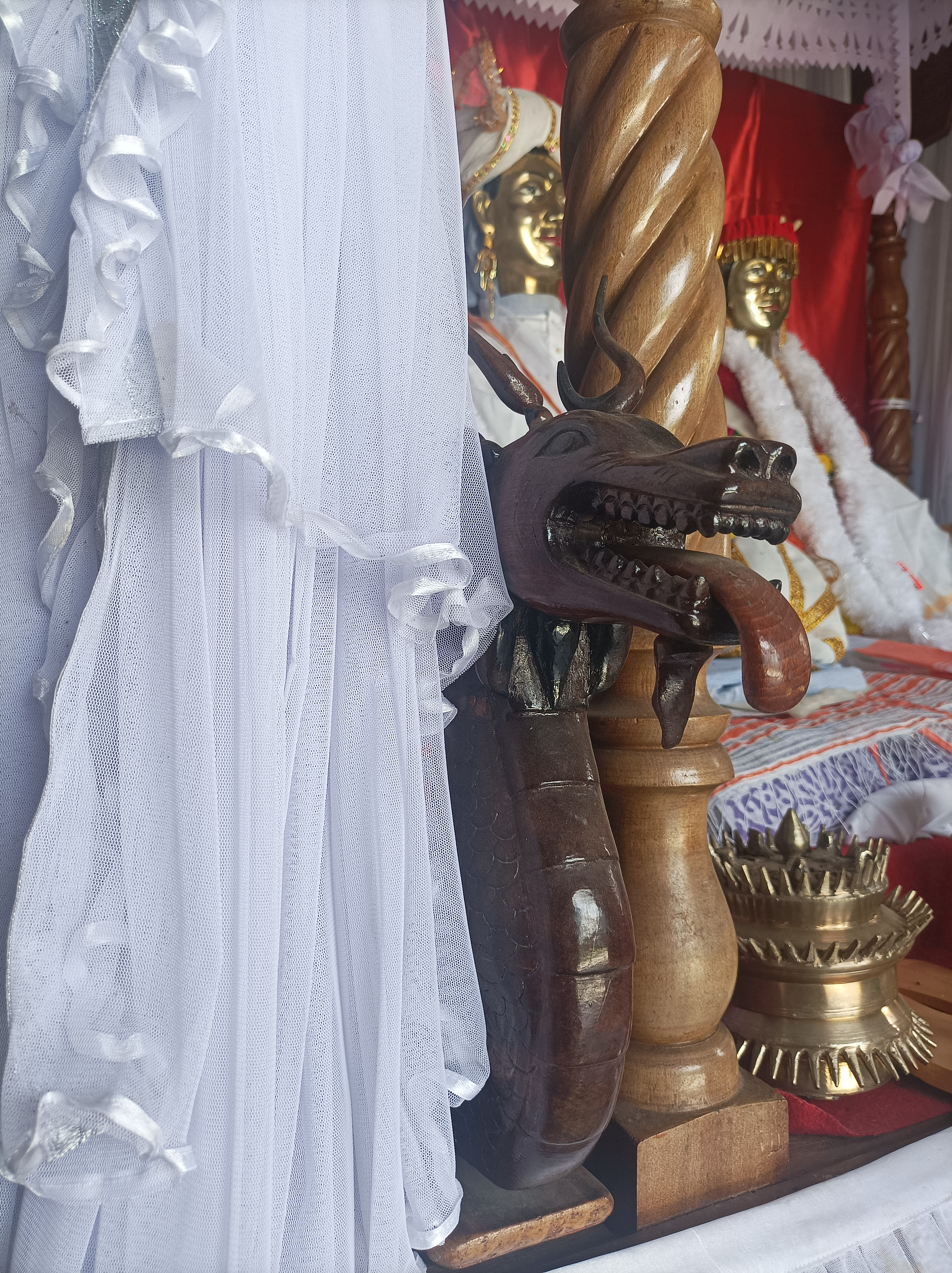

The major architectural designs for the 48-feet high Pakhangba temple are the sacred altar dedicated to God Pakhangba and the seven-coloured flag designed roof, symbolising the seven Meitei clans.

== Visiting ==
The temple is visited by both the followers as well as the non-followers of Sanamahism. During November 2018, Maha Chakri Sirindhorn, a princess of Thailand, visited the Pakhangba Temple as a part of her visit to Manipur's Sangai festival. She was accompanied by a Thai media team and the officials of Ministry of External Affairs, Government of India during her visit to the temple.

== See also ==
- Sanamahi Temple
- Hiyangthang Lairembi Temple
- Hijagang
- Kangla Sanathong
- Statue of Meidingu Nara Singh
