= Kangla Fort =

Fortified Palace in Manipur, India

Kangla
- Kanglā (Meitei)
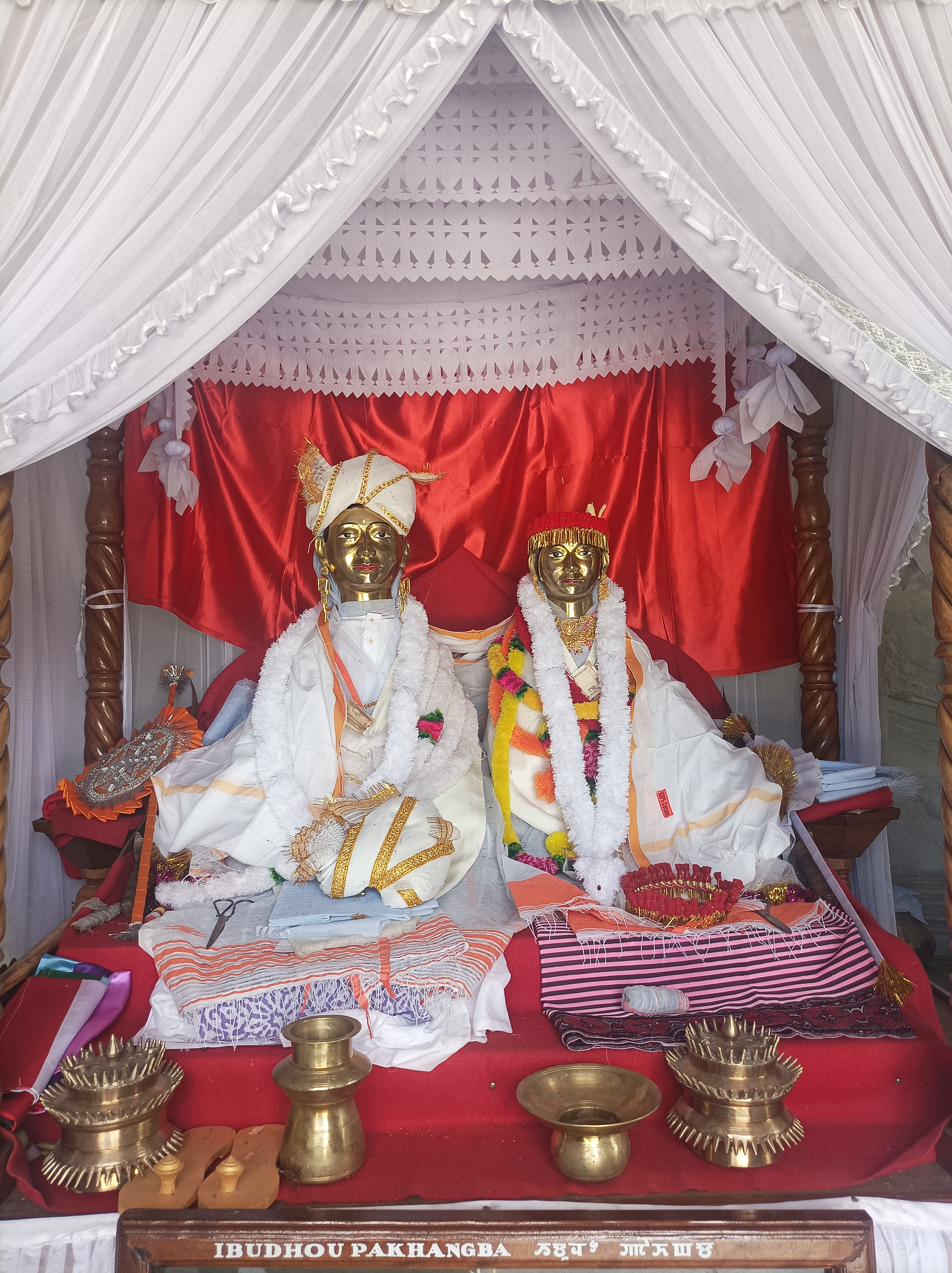
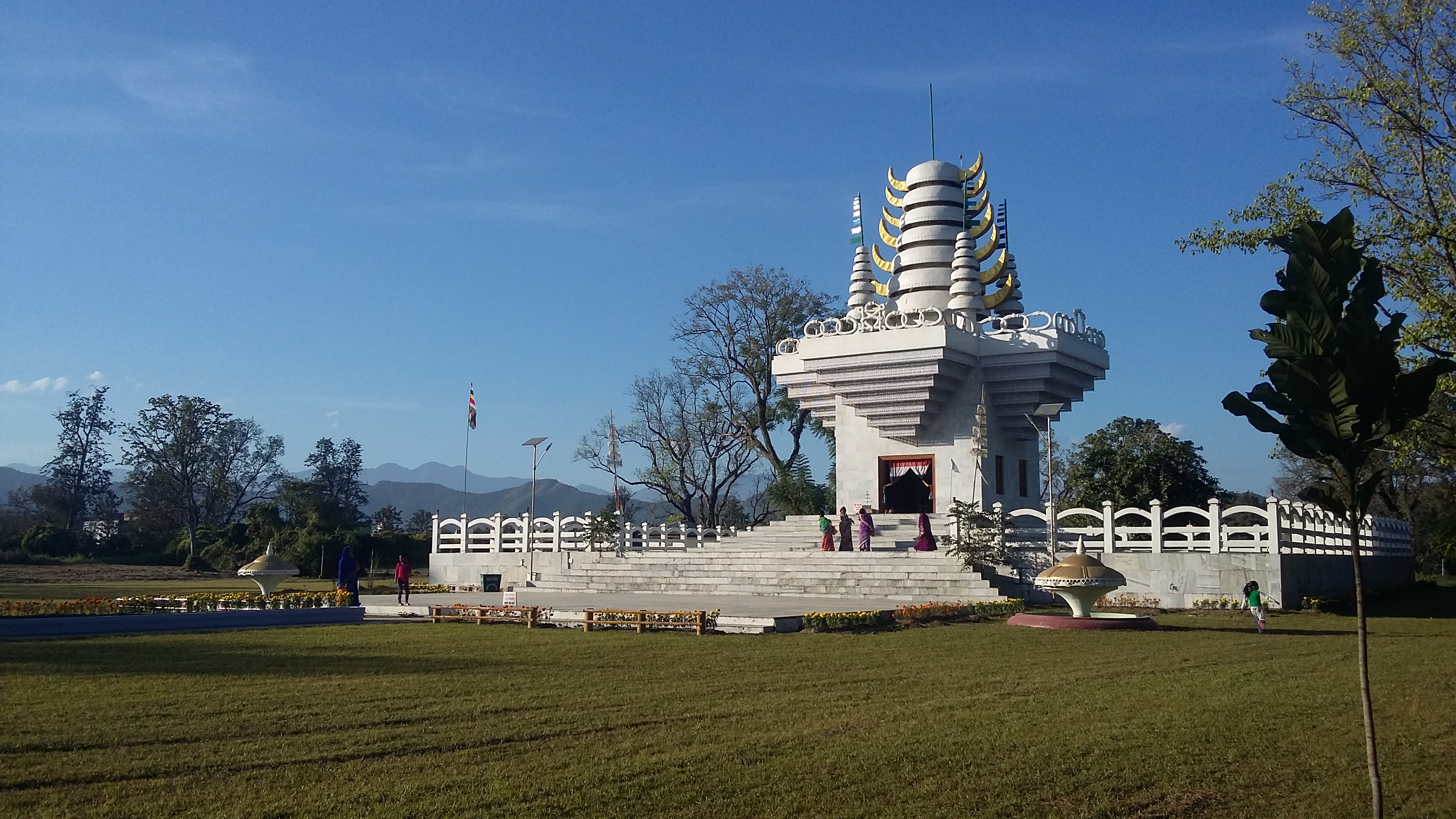
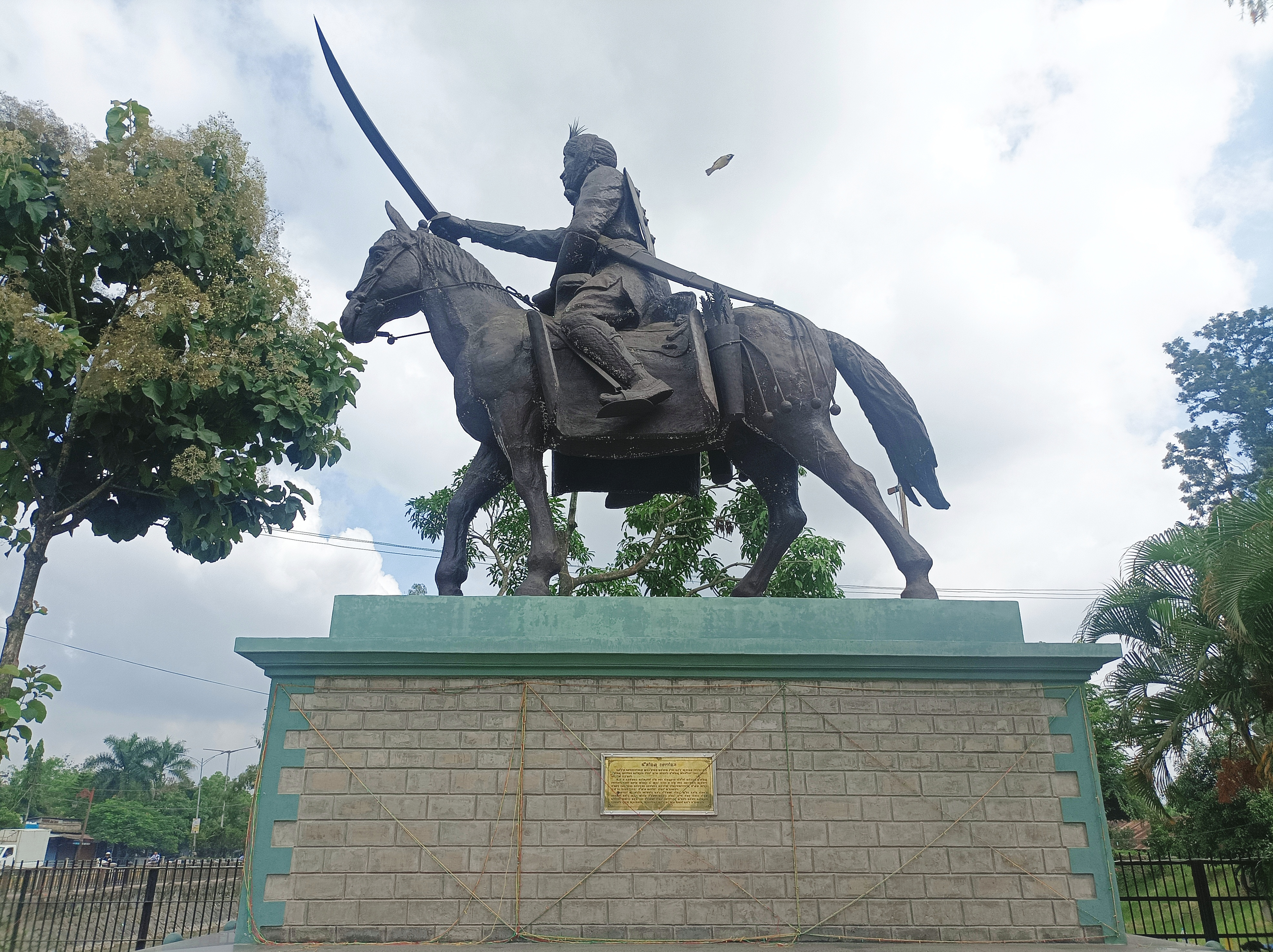
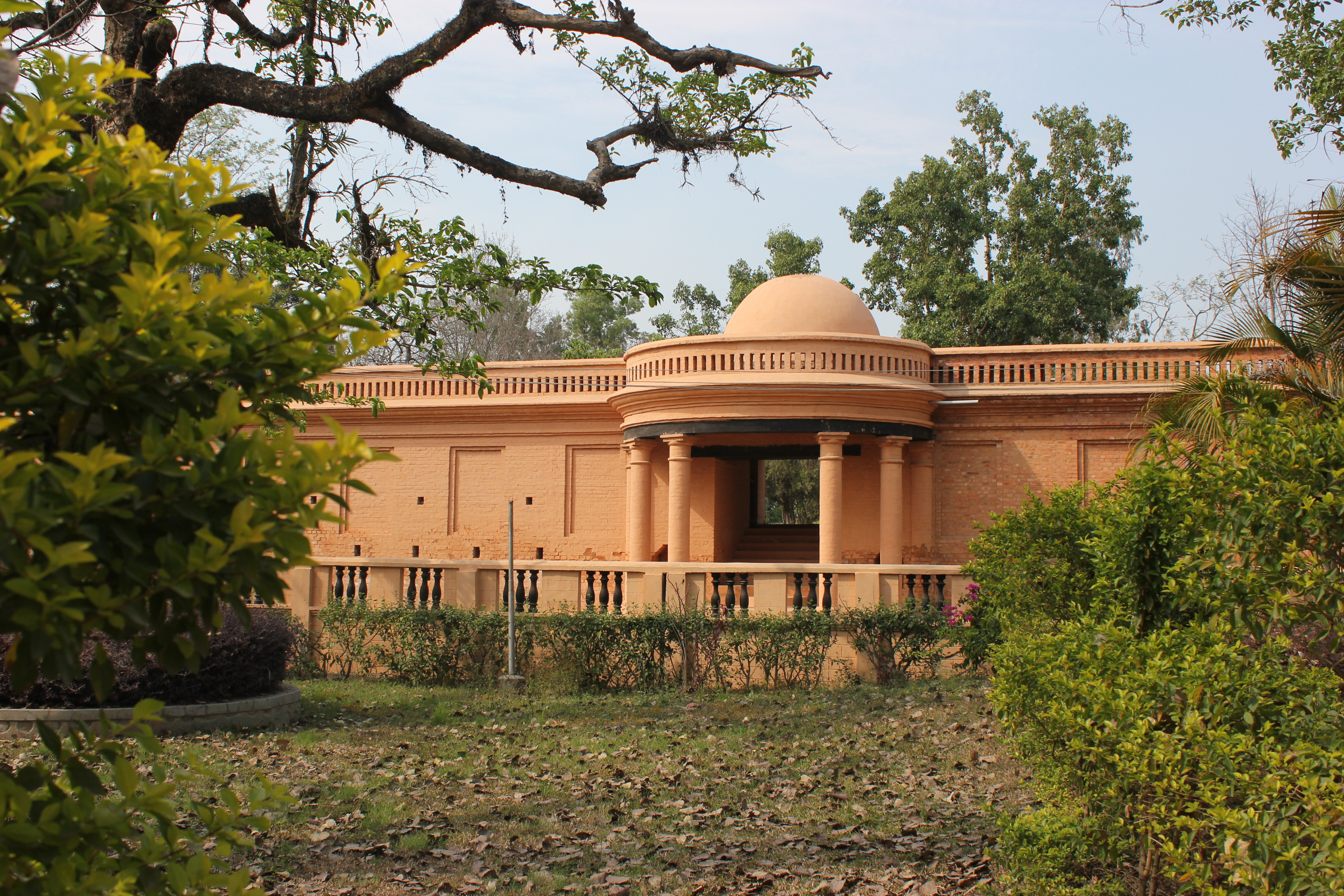
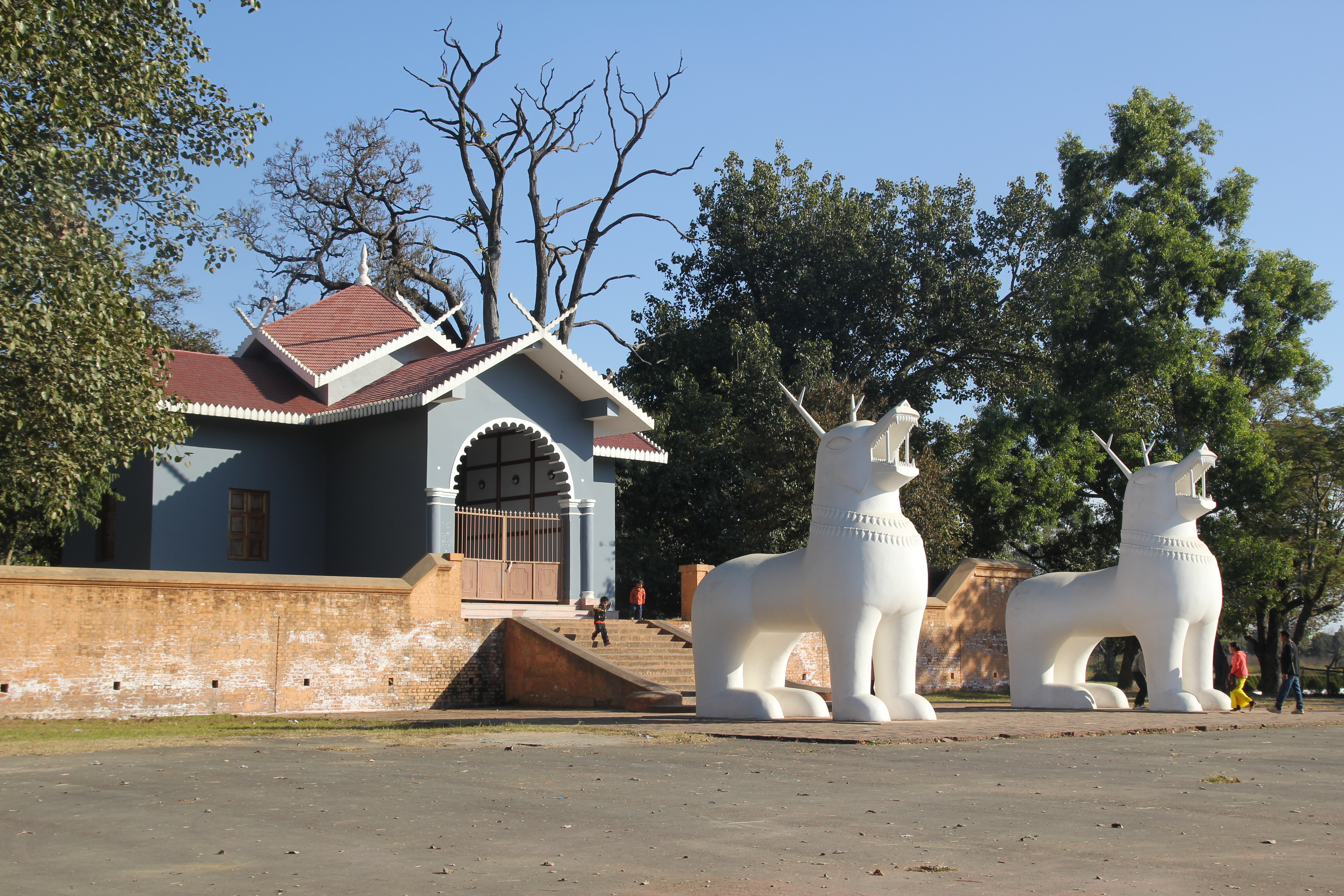
- From top, left to right: the sacred images of God Pakhangba and his consort, the Kangla Sanathong, the holy Hiyang Hirens inside the Hijagang, the Pakhangba Temple, Kangla, the statue of Meidingu Nara Singh, the Sanggai Yumpham and the dual statues of Kanglā Shā dragon, the emblem of Manipur

- Interactive map of Kangla
- 24.808°N 93.940°E
- Type: capital city (historical)
- Periods: Classical Antiquity
- Cultures: Meitei culture
- Associated with: Ningthouja dynasty; British Army; Assam Rifles (Indian Army); Government of Manipur
- Location: Imphal West district
- Region: Kangleipak (Meitei for 'Manipur')
- Part of: Kingdom of Manipur (historical); India (present)

History
- Event: Anglo Manipur War

Site notes
- Architectural style: Meitei architecture
- Condition: protected
- Owner: Government of Manipur
- Management: Kangla Fort Board
- Public access: yes

The Kanglā is a historic site and tourist attraction in fortified palace in Imphal, Manipur, India. The Kangla, a fortified palace, was the traditional seat of the Meitei kings of the Ningthouja dynasty. It includes a royal residence, two museums, gardens, a traditional boathouse holding Meitei racing boats, a Sanamahist temple, and other Meitei cultural and artistic treasures.

== Description and history ==
The Kanglā is a historic site, consisting of a old fortified palace in Imphal, Manipur, India. It formerly extended to both sides of the Imphal River, but only the only on the western half survives. Kangla means "the prominent part of the dry land" in old Meetei. Imphal was the capital of pre-modern Manipur, and the Kangla was the traditional seat of the Meitei rulers of the Ningthouja dynasty.

The Kangla a sacred place to the Meiteis, and a revered spot for the people of Manipur, reminding them of the days of their independence.

The Kangla is a proposed UNESCO World Heritage Site.

== Gates ==
=== Western gate ===
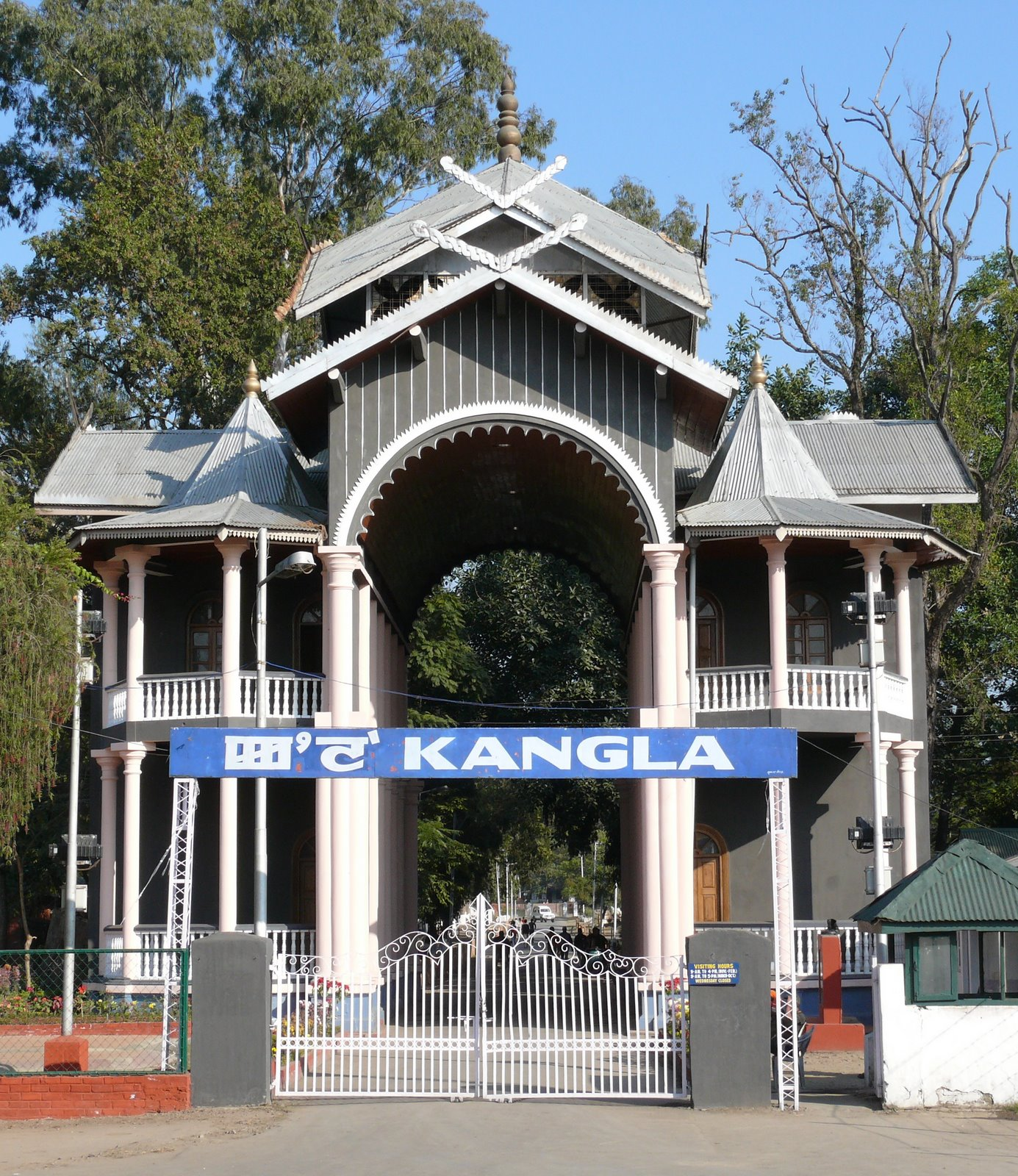
The Kangla Santhong.

The Kangla Sanathong (Meitei: ꯀꯪꯂꯥ ꯁꯅꯊꯣꯡ, romanized: golden gate to the Kangla), the Royal entrance to the Kangla, stands at the Western entrance to the fort.

== Museums ==
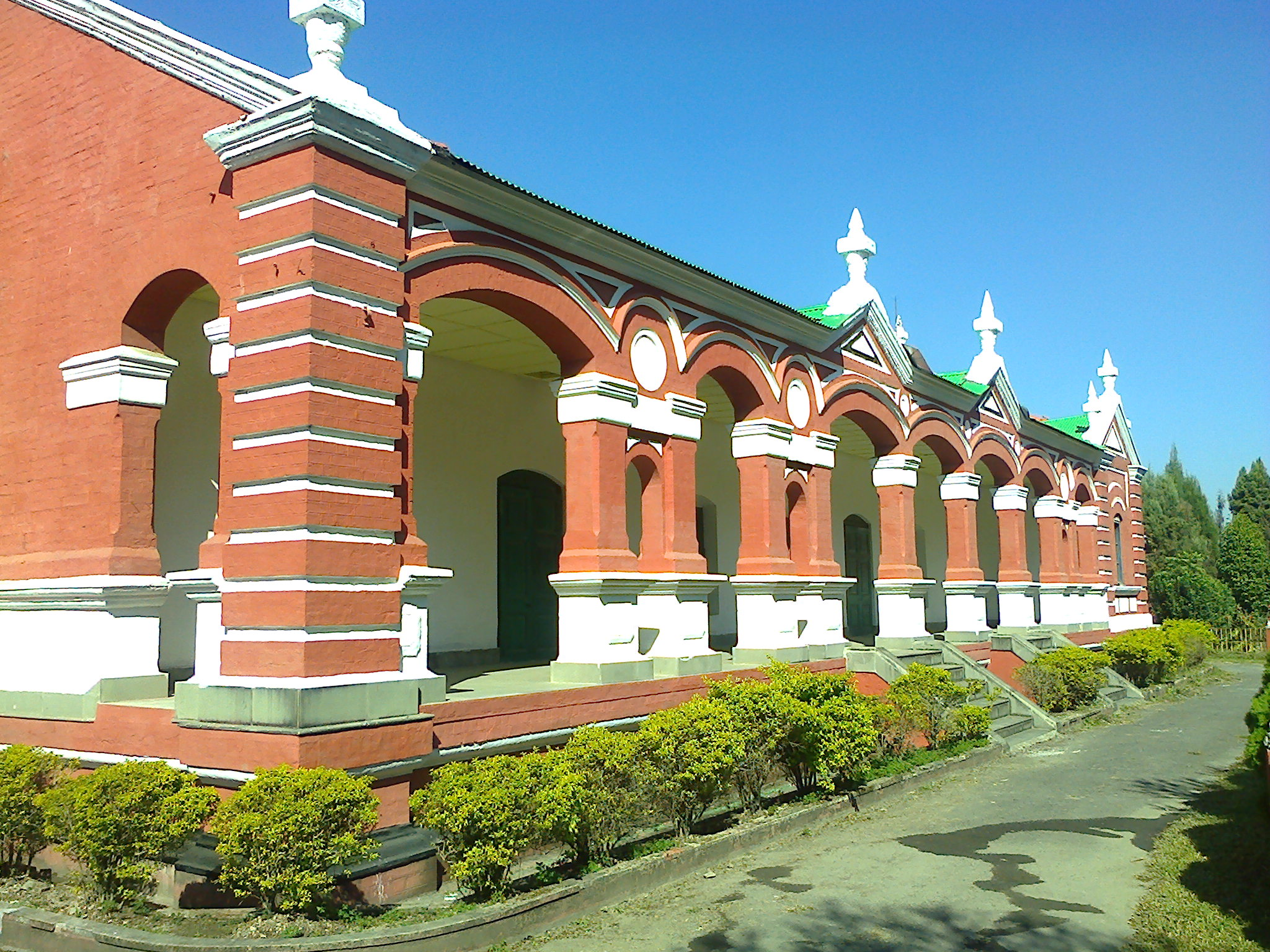
The "Kangla Museum" inside the fort

There are three museums inside the fort, which are the Kangla Museum, the Archaeological Museum and the Memento Museum. Some people also count the Hijagang (Boatyard of traditional Meitei watercraft) as a museum.

=== Kangla museum ===
The Kangla Museum showcases the lifestyles of royalties, ancient artistic and cultural heritage and maps of Kangleipak (Meitei for 'Manipur'). In the year 2018, alongside the annual Sangai festival celebrations, the Kangla Museum was visited by Maha Chakri Sirindhorn, the princess of Thailand.

=== Archaeological museum ===
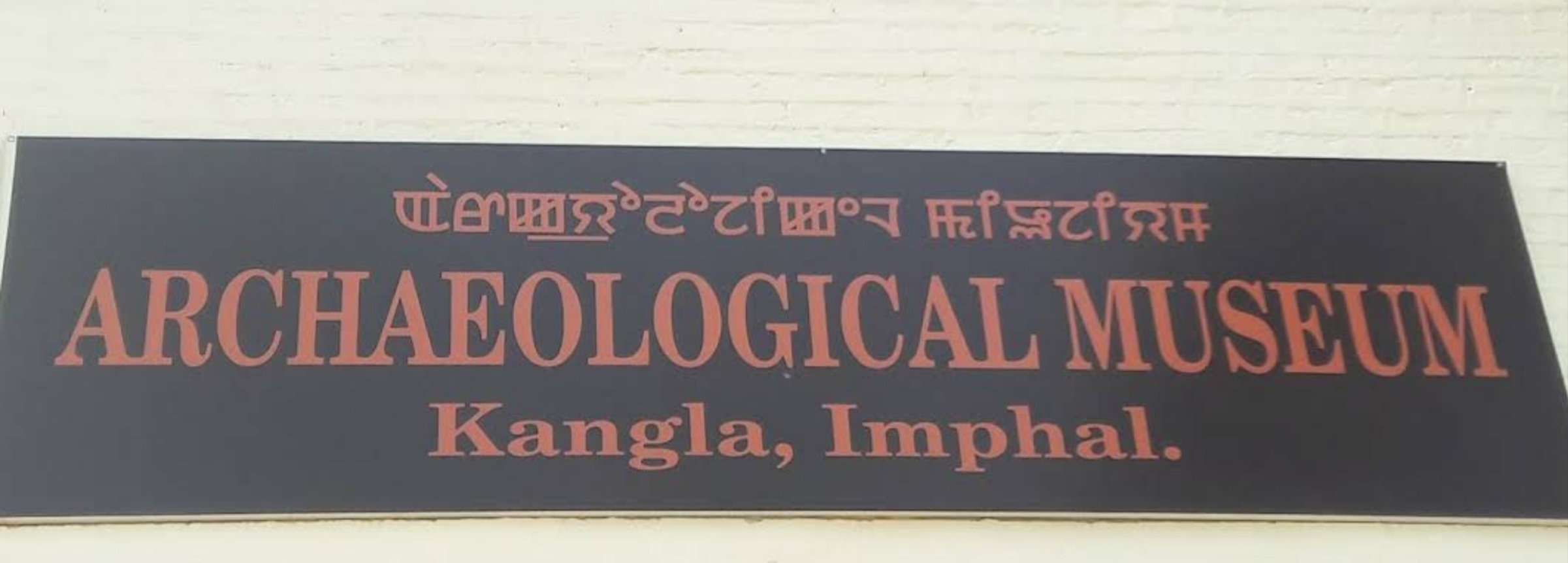
The "Archaeological Museum" inside the fort

Inaugurated on the 20th of November 2017, by Nongthombam Biren Singh, the Chief Minister of Manipur, the Archaeological Museum inside the fort, houses replicas including that of the memorial stone of Maharaja Chandrakirti Singh at Ukhrul district, Churachandpur, Tipaimukh and areas of Imphal Valley. Besides, stone tools belonging to Stone Age found in the Tharon Cave and the Kangkhui Cave are also kept in the museum. Hardened pots and inscriptions are preserved. Various antique coins are also on display in the museum. Ancient artefacts collected from the excavations of Sekta, Khangabok and the Kangla itself are also on display.

=== Memento museum ===
On the 21st of November 2018, Nongthombam Biren Singh, the Chief Minister of Manipur, inaugurated the Memento Museum inside the fort before the beginning of the annual Sangai festival 2018. It was done before the arrival of Maha Chakri Sirindhorn, the princess of Thailand, for meeting Leishemba Sanajaoba, the titular King of Manipur, for gracing the annual Sangai festival and for visiting the fort.

== Gardens ==
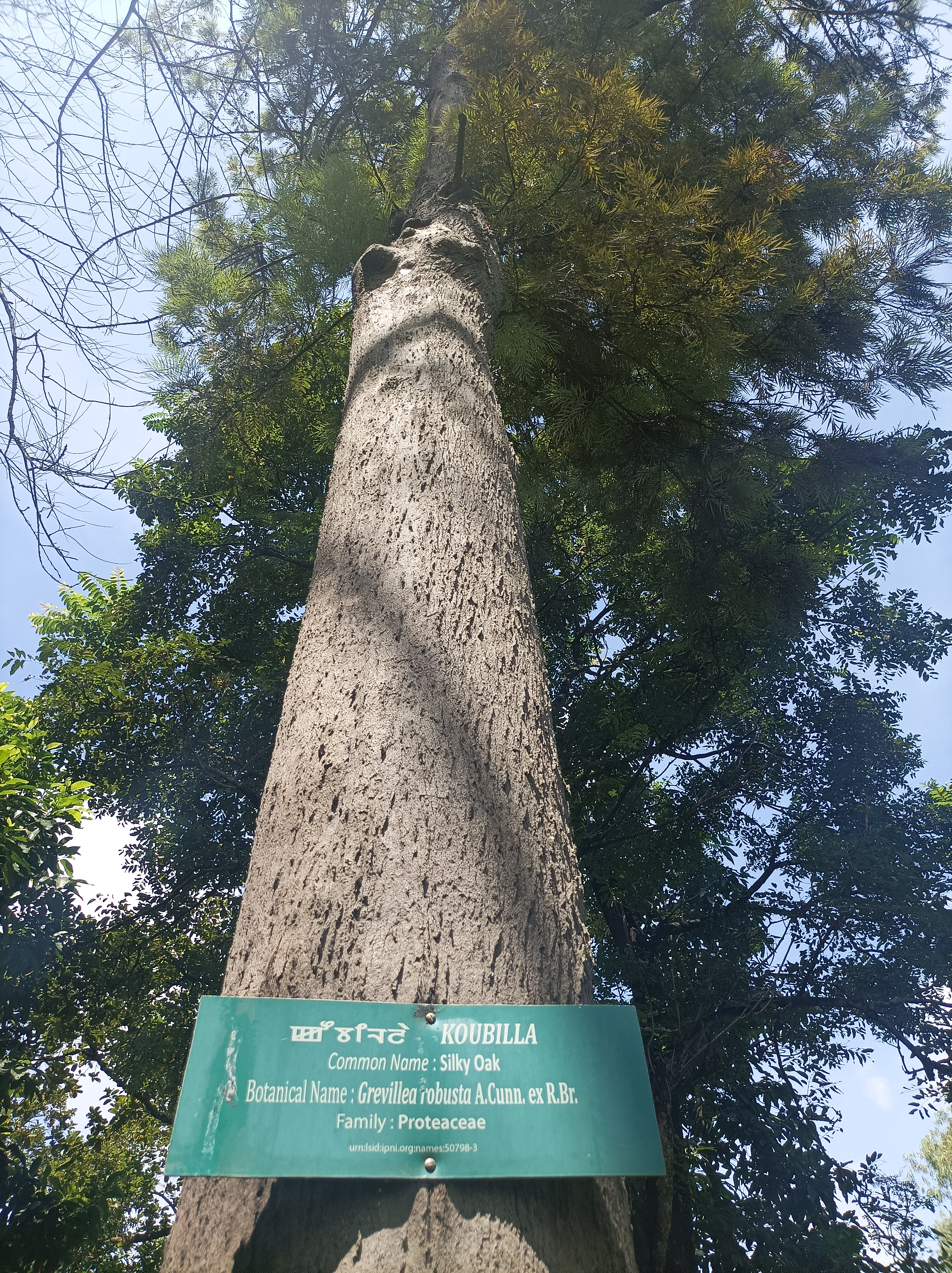
A tree of Koubilla (Grevillea robusta) species growing inside the Kangla

The Kangla possesses a sobriquet, "Lungs of Imphal" as it is heavily forested, providing oxygen in the heart of the metropolis of Manipur. Unfortunately, due to construction activities in the last few years, some deforestation occurred inside the Kangla.

In the year 2019, the 3.5 acres (1.4 hectares) Kangla Herbal Garden was planted, in order to bring medicinal plants inside the Kangla. The botanical garden is the responsibility of the Lamphelpat-based branch of the North East Institute of Science and Technology, Jorhat (NEIST). The Government of Manipur provided ₹6.16 lakh (equivalent to ₹15 lakh or US$16,000 in 2026) out of ₹13.46 lakh (equivalent to ₹33 lakh or US$35,000 in 2026) to NEIST to carry out the task. It planted around 131 different plants, (including around 20 medicinal plant species), includung, iheigru (Phyllanthus emblica), kihori (Phyllanthus acidus), agar (Aquilaria agallocha), neem (Azadirachta indica), tera (Mobax malabathricum), singairei (Nyctanthes arbor-tristis) and leihao (Michelia champaca).

In June in 2019, around 700 indigenous fruit-bearing tree saplings were planted inside the Nura Heikol (Minangkabau for 'women's orchard'), formerly known as "Biodiversity Park" as part of the Governmenkt Green Manipur initiative.

In September in 2019, the newspaper Sangai Express celebrated 20 years in print by adding around 120 trees, including mayokfa, agar, uningthou, teak, chahui and samba, planted by its editorial board and management team.

The Kangla Fort Board, under the leadership of Nongthombam Biren, the Chief Minister of Manipur plan to eventually plan some 10,000 trees inside the Kangla.

== Places ==
Image(s)	Name	Description(s)
	Kanglasha (Meitei: ꯀꯪꯂꯥꯁꯥ, lit. 'Dragons of the Kangla')	A pair of sculptures dedicated to the lion god Nongshaba.
	Kangla Uttra Shanglen (Meitei: ꯀꯪꯂꯥ ꯎꯠꯇ꯭ꯔꯥ ꯁꯪꯂꯦꯟ, lit. 'Royal Office Building of the Kangla')	A religious office building of Sanamahism (traditional Meitei religion), built in the traditional Meitei architectural style. The most significant and the holiest element is the chirong (literally, "horns"), which is the V-shaped design adorned on the roof of the building.
	Sanggai Yumpham (Meitei: ꯁꯪꯒꯥꯏ ꯌꯨꯝꯐꯝ, lit. 'Royal residence')	A fortified royal residence inside the Kangla.
	Inner Polo Ground (Meitei: ꯃꯅꯨꯡ ꯀꯥꯡꯖꯩꯕꯨꯡ, romanized: manung kangjeibung)	Ningthouja dynasty polo field located to the south west of the citadel inside the Kangla
	Manūng Thāngapāt (Meitei: ꯃꯅꯨꯡ ꯊꯥꯡꯒꯄꯥꯠ, lit. 'inner moat')	Manung Thangapat is the Inner Moat of the Kangla Fort, encircling and protecting the Sanggai Yumpham as a second line of defense.
	Statue of Meidingu Nara Singh (Meitei: ꯃꯩꯗꯤꯡꯉꯨ ꯅꯔꯁꯤꯡꯍꯒꯤ ꯃꯤꯇꯝ, romanized: meidingu narasinghgi mitam)	The grand bronze sculpture of King Nara Singh riding on a Manipuri pony.
	The tomb of King Bodhchandra (Meitei: ꯅꯤꯡꯊꯧ ꯕꯣꯙꯆꯟꯗ꯭ꯔꯒꯤ ꯃꯪꯂꯦꯟ, romanized: ningthou bodhchandragi manglen)	The site where the mortal remains of Maharaja Bodhchandra Singh (Manglen of Ningthou Bodhchandra or Samadhi of Maharaja Bodhchandra), the last ruler of sovereign state of Manipur Kingdom, was consigned to flames on 9 December 1955.
	Chīngkhei Īkon (Meitei: ꯆꯤꯡꯈꯩ ꯏꯀꯣꯟ, lit. 'Northeastern pond') or Chingkhei Pukhri.	A sacred pond in the northeastern corner of the Sanggai Yumpham.
	Kangla Boatyard (Meitei: ꯍꯤꯖꯒꯥꯡ, romanized: hijagāng)	The boatyard houses traditional Meitei racing boats.
	Pakhangba Temple, Kangla (Meitei: ꯏꯄꯨꯊꯧ ꯄꯥꯈꯪꯄ ꯂꯥꯏꯁꯪ, romanized: iputhou pakhangba laishang, lit. 'Temple of Lord Pakhangba')	A temple dedicated to the Sanamahist god Pakhangba.

== See also ==
- Kangla Nongpok Torban
- Museums in Kangla
