= Hijagang =

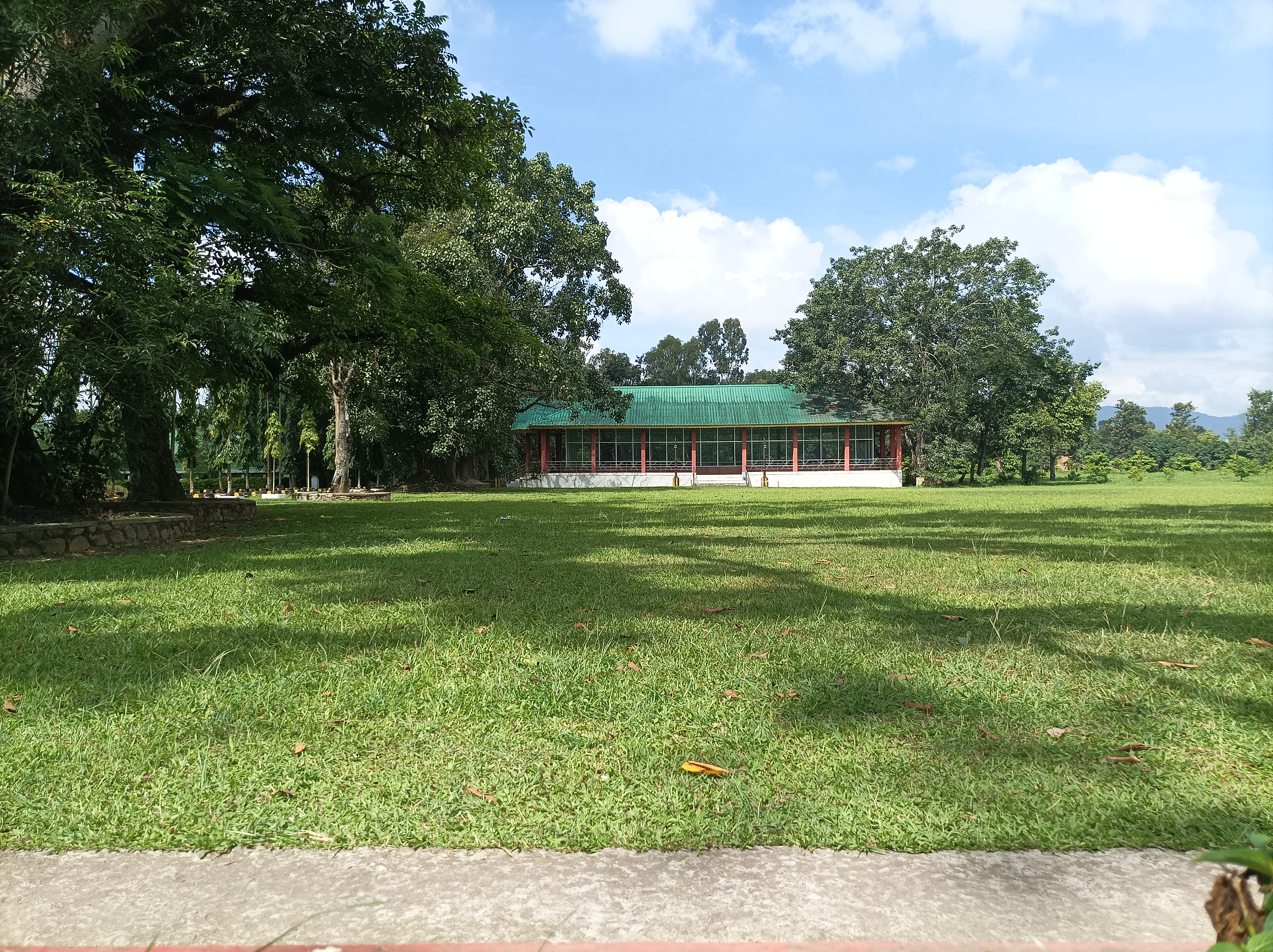
- Two hiyang hiren watercraft flanked by two tanna hi inside the Hijagang in the Kangla Fort and an eastern view of the Hijagang.
- Alternative names: Hiyang Hiren Thampham

General information
- Architectural style: Meitei architecture
- Location: Kangla Fort, Imphal West district, Manipur, Kangla Fort, Imphal West district, Manipur, Imphal, India
- Construction started: 2010
- Opened: 2013
- Inaugurated: 2013
- Client: Government of Manipur
- Owner: Government of Manipur
- Governing body: Kangla Fort Board, Government of Manipur
- Affiliation: Meitei religion (Sanamahism)

Design and construction
- Known for: hiyang hirens and tanna his

The Hijagang (Meitei pronunciation: hī-ja-gāng) is a boathouse inside the Kangla Fort in Imphal, India. It houses four traditional Meitei watercraft, including two hiyang hirens (Royal racing boats) and two tanna his (commoners' racing boats). (Note: Terms like canoe and dugout are also used besides watercraft and boat to refer to the "Hiyang Hiren"s and the "Tanna Hi"s.) According to Meitei religious beliefs, the hiyang hirens are used by the male ancestral deity (Meitei: Ibudhou) and female ancestral deity (Meitei: Ibendhou) and are sacred to the Meiteis, the major ethnic group of Manipur.

== Construction and inauguration ==
The construction of the Hijagang watercraft storage building started in the year 2010 and completed in the year 2013.

On 21 August 2013, with the performances of necessary religious rites and rituals by the Amaibas (Meitei for 'priests') and the Amaibis (Meitei for 'priestesses') in the early morning, the Hijagang was inaugurated by Okram Ibobi Singh, the then Chief Minister of Manipur, who was also the then President of "Kangla Fort Board".

== Featuring watercraft ==
=== Crafting processes and inaugural ===
According to RK Nimai, the then Commissioner of the Department of Arts and Culture, Government of Manipur, the two kinds of watercraft were made from special kind of trees brought from Khamsom village in Senapati district of Manipur. The crafting processes were initiated in Khamsom in the year 2007. Later, the woods for crafting the Hiyang Hirens were brought to the Kangla on 6 June 2007, with the work of sculpturing getting commenced 2 days later. The watercraft were made by a four-member team under the leadership of craftsman L. Thoiba. Later, the watercraft were inaugurated on 19 February 2010 (3 years before the completion of the building construction).

=== Crafting materials used ===
The hiyang hiren are made of uningthou and the tanna hi of tairen.

=== Lengths, widths and heights ===
Types of Watercraft	Length	Width	Height	Reference(s)
Hiyang Hiren of Ibudhou	64.2 feet	36 inches	63 inches	
Hiyang Hiren of Ibendhou	60 feet	35 inches	57 inches	
1st "Tanna Hee"	52 feet	31.5 inches		
2nd "Tanna Hee"	51 feet	31 inches		

== See also ==
- Hiyang Hiren
- Hiyang Tannaba
- Heikru Hidongba
- Kangla Sanathong
- Statue of Meidingu Nara Singh
- Manipur State Museum
