= Statue of Meidingu Nara Singh =

Monument in Imphal, India

Statue of Meidingu Nara Singh (Maharaja Narasingh Statue)
- Meidingu Narasinghgi Mitam (Meitei)
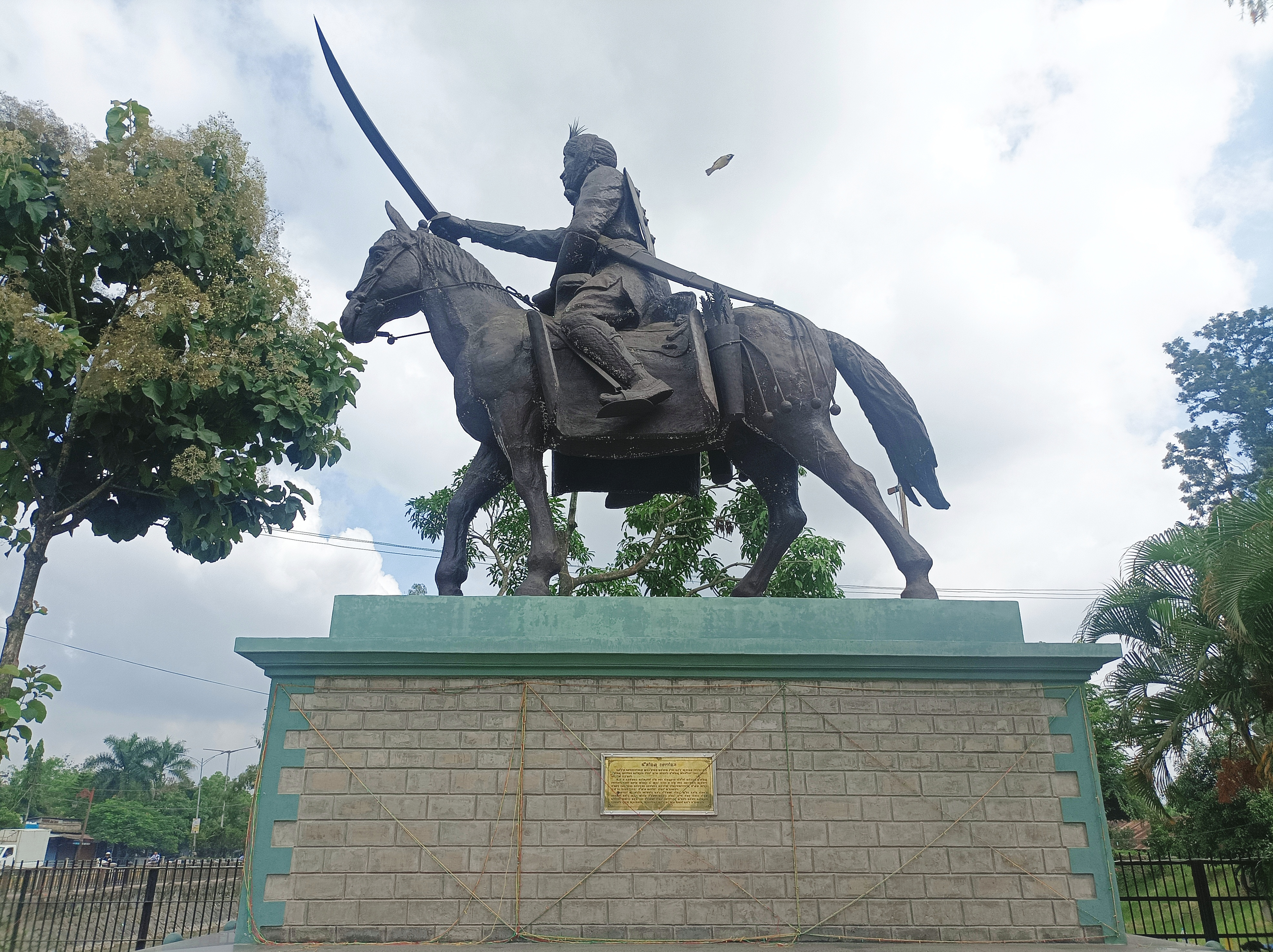
- Statue of Meidingu Nara Singh (1844-1850 A.D.) in front of the Kangla Sanathong, the Western Entrance to the Kangla Fort in Imphal
- Location: Kangla Sanathong, the Western Entrance to the Kangla Fort in Imphal
- Coordinates: 24.8075°N 93.9387°E
- Designer: S. Nimai, a sculpture teacher of Imphal Art College
- Type: Bronze sculpture
- Material: Bronze
- Opening date: 15 June 2022
- Dedicated to: Meitei monarch Meidingu Nara Singh (1844-1850 A.D.), His Highness, the ruler of Kangleipak (Meitei for 'Manipur kingdom')

The Statue of Meidingu Nara Singh, also known as the Statue of Maharaja Narasingh (Meitei: Meidingu Narasinghgi Mitam), (Note: The terms "Nara Singh" and "Narasingh" are used interchangeably.) is a bronze sculpture located at the Kangla Sanathong, the western entrance gate to the Kangla Fort in Imphal. Meidingu Nara Singh (1844-1850 A.D.) was a Meitei monarch and the sovereign of Kangleipak (Meitei for 'Manipur kingdom').

== History ==
During April 2022, on the 172nd death anniversary of Meidingu Nara Singh, Manipur's chief minister Nongthombam Biren Singh announced that the Government of Manipur is planning to install a statue of the Meitei monarch at the western entrance gate to the Kangla Fort within 100 days. The observation function was organised by Manipur State Archaeology, Department of Art and Culture, Government of Manipur.

To the public, Nongthombam Biren Singh announced the following:

Paid rich tributes to the gallant Maharaja Nara Singh on his 172nd death anniversary at Kangla today. During the First Anglo-Burmese War, soon after the 7 years devastation, his strong military acumen led to the defeat of the Burmese army by driving them beyond the Ningthi river.
The people of Manipur will always remember Maharaja Nara Singh's spirit of nationalism and the Government of Manipur will soon build a befitting memorial tomb in honour of his great contribution to the people of Manipur.

Chief Minister Nongthombam Biren, recalling the struggles of Meidingu Nara Singh and others during the Seven Years Devastation, said:

Whatever we have today is all because of the hard work and sacrifices of our great leaders and our society would have no value if we don't honour them and follow their paths.

On the occasion of the very 172nd death anniversary, Manipur's Rajya Sabha Member of Parliament Leishemba Sanajaoba, who is also the current titular King of Manipur, said,

"Maharaja Nara Singh was a king who always worked for the protection of the motherland and he always gave priority to the welfare of people rather than the powers he possessed as a king."

== Opening ==
On 15 June 2022, the Government of Manipur, led by Chief Minister Nongthombam Biren Singh, unveiled the statue of Meidingu Narasingh, which was built next to the Kangla Sanathong, the western entrance gate to the Kangla Fort in Imphal.

The bronze sculpture of Meidingu Nara Singh (Meitei: Meidingu Leiren Nonglen Sentreng Manikhamba) was unveiled at the western entrance gate to the Kangla Fort, under the aegis of the Department of Arts and Culture, Government of Manipur. The unveiling ceremony was participated by Dr RK Nimai Singh, Arts and Culture Commissioner, L. Birendra, Elangbam Sonamani and R.K. Modhuchandra, the senior most person of the Ningthouja dynasty, the clan of Meidingu Nara Singh. The sculpture was crafted by S. Nimai, a sculpture teacher of Imphal Art College. It took him five years to complete the artwork.

== See also ==
- Mount Manipur Memorial
- Kanglasha
- Cultural depictions of lions
- First N. Biren Singh ministry
- Second N. Biren Singh ministry
