= List of Indian horse breeds =

This is a list of some of the breeds and types of horse considered in India to be wholly or partly of Indian origin. Some may have complex or obscure histories, so inclusion here does not necessarily imply that a breed is predominantly or exclusively Indian.

== Breeds ==
Indian horse breeds

- Bhutia
- Chummarti
- Deccani
- Kathiawari
- Manipuri Pony
- Marwari
- Sikang
- Sindhi
- Spiti
- Zaniskari
- Bhimthadi

== Types ==
- Indian Country-bred
- Indian Half-bred
