= Chau Chau Kang Nilda =

Mountain in Himachal Pradesh, India

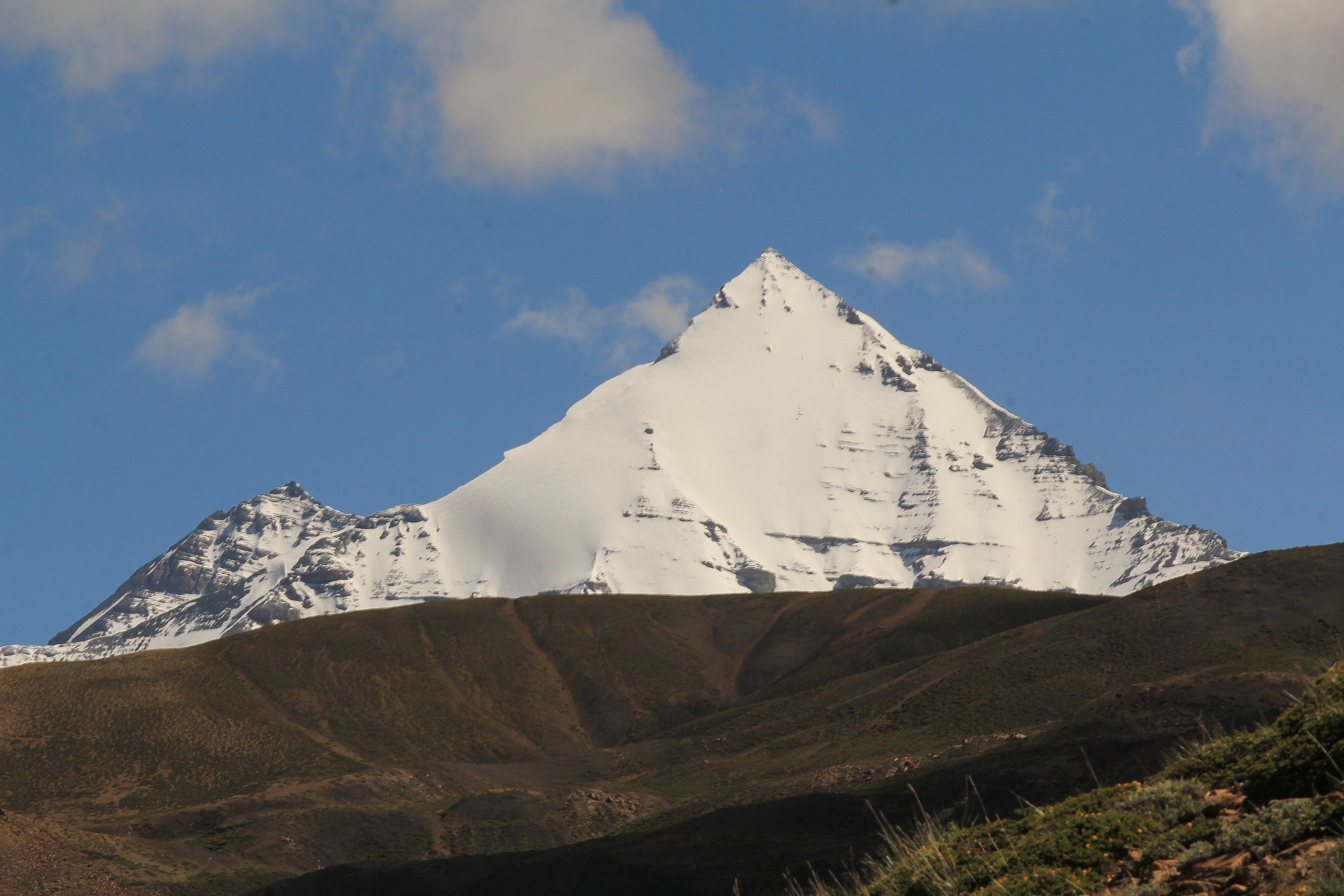
- Chau Chau Kang Nilda from Komic village on the way to Demul Village

Highest point
- Elevation: 6,303 m (20,679 ft)
- Prominence: 1,000 m (3,280 ft)
- Coordinates: 32°18′36″N 78°09′0″E

Geography
- Location within India
- Location: Lahaul and Spiti district, Himachal Pradesh, India
- Parent range: Himachal Pradesh Himalayas

Climbing
- First ascent: 1939 by J. O. M. Roberts

Chau Chau Kang Nilda also known as 'Guan Nelda' or 'blue moon in the sky' is a mountain in the western Himalayas. It lies in the northern Indian state of Himachal Pradesh.

The mountain is located 13 km northeast of Kaza, the main town in Spiti, in the district of Lahaul and Spiti district.

== Climbing history ==
The Chau Chau Kang Nilda was first climbed in 1939 by J.O.M. Roberts (James Owen Merion Roberts) who crossed Spiti from Kullu. He became the first mountaineer to visit Spiti.

The second ascent was made in 1955 by Trevor Braham and Peter Holmes, a young Cambridge University graduate, who went on to become the Chairman of Shell.

Indian expeditions climbed Chau Chau Kang Nilda in 1966, and again in 1981.

== Gallery ==
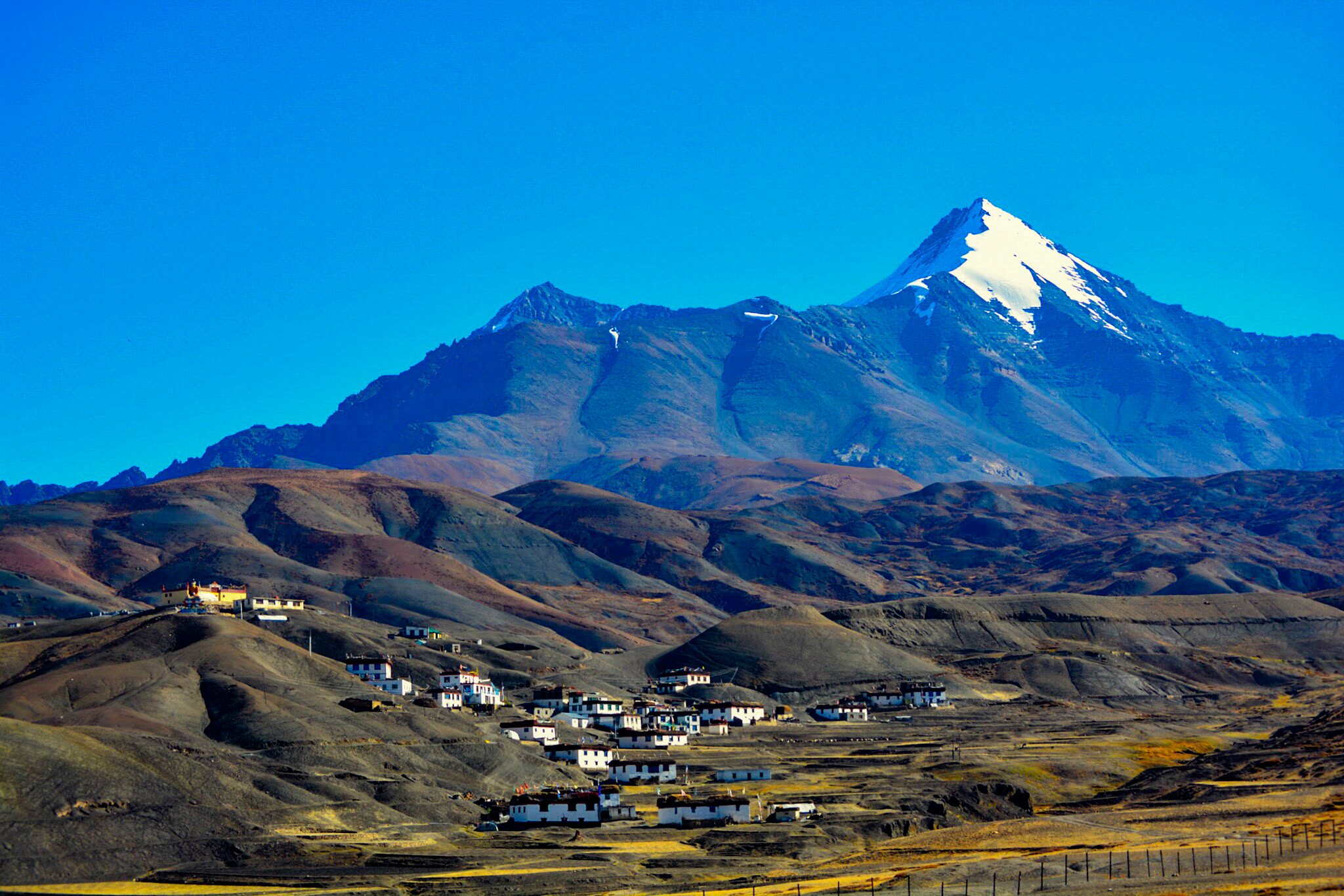
With Langza village. Taken from the southwest.

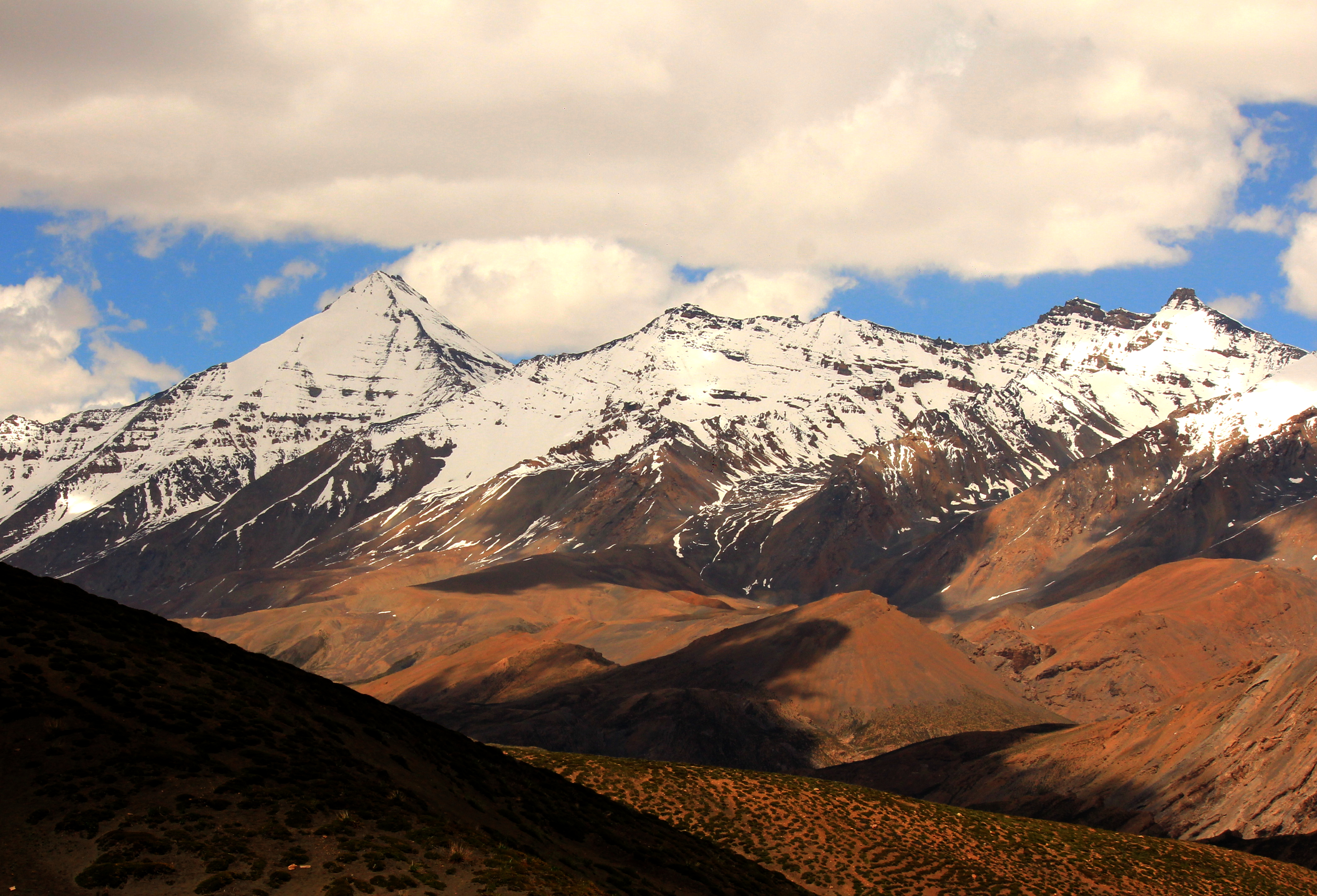
Chau Chau Kang Nilda in the left. Taken from the south.
