= Nangchen horse =

Breed of horse

The Nangchen horse is a small breed of horse native to the Kham region of northern Tibet, thought to have been bred pure since the 9th century. They became known to the western world in 1994 due to the exploration of French anthropologist Michel Peissel.

These animals are said to contain no ancestry from any of the common sources for most other Tibetan pony breeds, neither Mongolian horse, Arabian nor any type of Turkish blood. They are powerful and fast, said to have many of the characteristics of a modern racehorse. They have refined features, are pony-sized, but tall for ponies, swift and agile. Their unique characteristics include adaptations to the very high altitude of the region, including enlarged lungs.

In 1995, Peissel returned to Tibet in hopes of purchasing some individual animals to study in more detail, but they were unable to do so due to the high prices asked for the animals by local residents. On their way back, Peissel's expedition took an alternate route through a remote area and observed the Riwoche horse.

== See also ==
- List of megafauna discovered in modern times
