= Kathiawari horse =

Indian breed of horse

Kathiawari; કાઠીયાવાડી
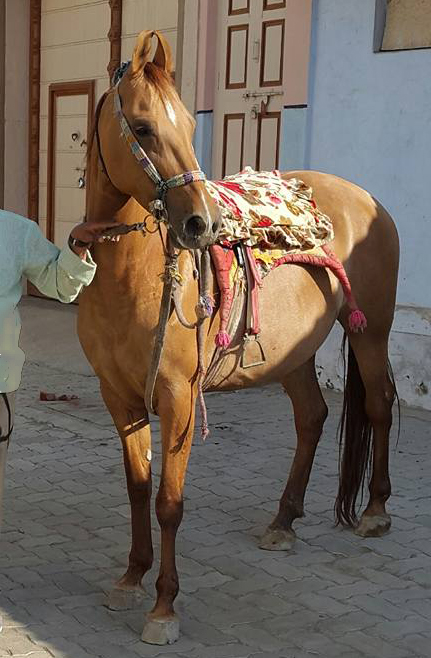
- Conservation status: FAO (2007): not at risk
- Other names: Kathiawadi; Gujarati: કાઠીયાવાડી; Kathi; Cutchi; Kutchi
- Country of origin: India
- Distribution: Kathiawar peninsula
- Standard: Indigenous Horse Society of India
- Use: riding; driving; police mount; sports

Traits
- Weight: Male: 325 kg; Female: 275 kg
- Height: 139–159 cm; Male: average: 149 cm; Female: average: 147 cm
- Colour: chestnut; bay; grey; dun
- Distinguishing features: unusual in-curved ears

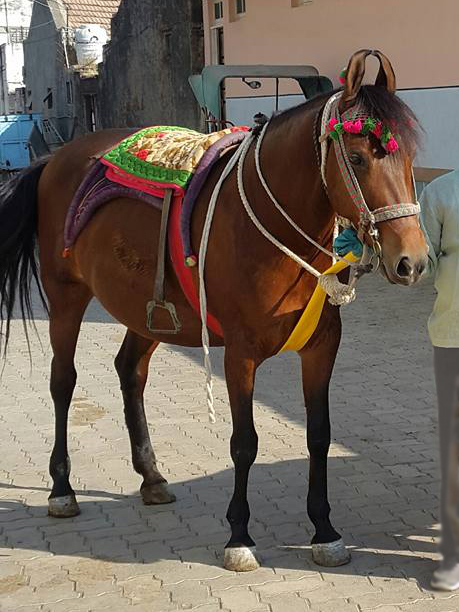

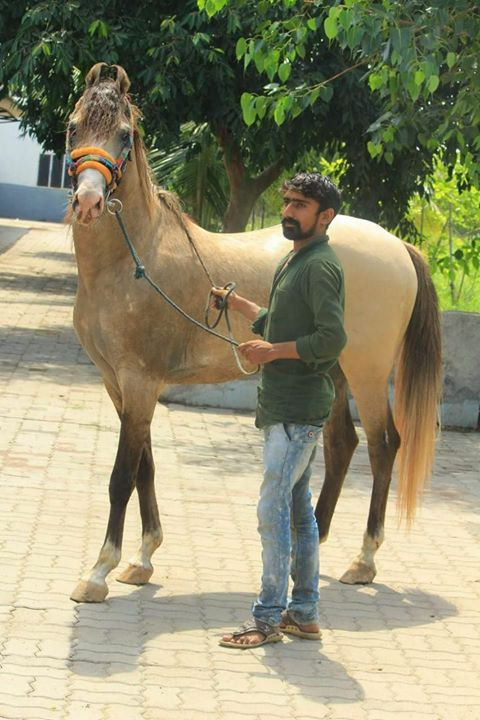
Stallion

The Kathiawari or Kathiawadi is an Indian breed of horse. It originates in the Kathiawar peninsula of Gujarat in western India, and is associated with the Kathi people of that area. It was originally bred as a desert war horse for use over long distances, in rough terrain, on minimal rations. It is closely related to the Marwari horses of Rajasthan; both breeds have been influenced by imported Arab horses. It is found in all colours except for black, and is most commonly chestnut. In the past it was used as a war horse and cavalry mount. Today it is used for riding, in harness and for sports; it may be used as a police horse and for the sport of tent-pegging. A stud-book is kept by the Kathiawari Horse Breeders' Association, which also organises annual shows.

== History ==
The origins of the Kathiawari are unknown. There were indigenous horses on the western coast of India before the arrival in the early sixteenth century of the Turco-Mongol invaders who later established the Mughal Empire. During the Mughal period, and later under the British Raj, Arab horses were imported to India and crossed with native stock, creating the ancestors of the modern Kathiawari breed. There may also have been some Mongolian influence.

The horses were bred as a desert war horse for use over long distances, in rough terrain, and on minimal rations. They were wiry, sleek, agile and fast, and could carry an armed man for long periods. According to tradition, they were loyal and brave in battle, often defending their riders even when wounded themselves. Some noble families bred their own line or strain, twenty-eight or thirty-six of which still exist.

The Kathiawari is bred mainly in the Kathiawar peninsula, but is found also in Maharashtra and Rajasthan. A breed society, the Kathiawari Horse Breeders' Association, keeps the stud-book. The government of Gujarat maintains a conservation herd at Junagadh, and has a number of stallions standing at stud in other parts of the state. The Indigenous Horse Society of India is also involved in conservation efforts. In 2007 no more than fifty Kathiawaris were in private hands.

A breed standard was drawn up in 2008. In 2010 the Gujarati government commissioned Saurashtra University to research the options for recovery of the Kathiawari breed, and also the extent to which it is related to the Marwari.

In 2007 the conservation status of the Kathiawari was listed as "not at risk" by the FAO. No breed numbers have been reported to DAD-IS since 1997, when there were about 7500.

== Characteristics ==
The average height at the withers is 147 cm (14.2 hands). Height should not be more than about 152 cm (15 h); taller horses may seem coarse. It may be any colour but black; Chestnut is the most common colour, followed by bay, grey and dun. Dun horses may have primitive markings, a dorsal stripe and zebra stripes on the legs. Skewbald patterns can occur. The Kathiawari has a concave facial profile, with a broad forehead and short muzzle. The neck and body are proportional and relatively short, while both the head and tail are carried high. Although well-proportioned, many Western breeders consider them to be lacking in bone in the legs. However, soundness is an inherent characteristic of the breed. One of the breed's most distinctive features is its ears, which curve inward to touch and sometimes overlap at the tips. The Kathiawari has the most extremely curved ears of any breed of horse. At some points in the breed's history, breeders focused on the preservation of these curving ears, to the detriment of some other, more important, physical characteristics. Like many desert breeds, the Kathiawari can subsist on minimal rations and water and is more resistant to the heat than breeds developed in colder climates. As well as the usual gaits, the Kathiawari also performs a swift, lateral pace, called the revaal. It is a high-spirited, intelligent and affectionate horse.

The Kathiawari is closely related to the Marwari breed from the Marwar region of Rajasthan, which borders with northern Gujarat. Genetic diversity analysis groups the two breeds, while the other four Indian horse breeds – the Bhutia, the Manipuri, the Spiti and the Zaniskari – form a distinct and separate group. The Kathiawari and the Marwari are also phenotypically similar; in particular, they have the same unusual in-curved ears. The Kathiawari is not as tall as the Marwari, and has a smaller thoracic circumference; it is most commonly chestnut, while the Marwari is usually black. Kathiawaris tend to have slight facial differences from the Marwari. The Kathiawari also resembles the Arab horse, which contributed significantly during the development of the breed.

== Use ==
In the past, the Kathiawari was considered a good cavalry mount. It was used by Maratha cavalry, and later – until the end of the First World War – by the Indian Army. In modern times it is used as a riding horse or as a harness horse. Some are used by Indian police forces, sometimes for tent-pegging, to which the Kathiawari is well suited. In 1995, annual breed shows were hosted by the breed association.
