= Spiti Horse =

Indian breed of horse

- Conservation status: FAO (2007): not at risk; DAD-IS (2021): at risk
- Other names: Chamurthi; Chamurti
- Country of origin: India
- Distribution: Himachal Pradesh

Traits
- Weight: Male: 185 kg; Female: 160 kg
- Height: Male: 125 cm; Female: 100 cm

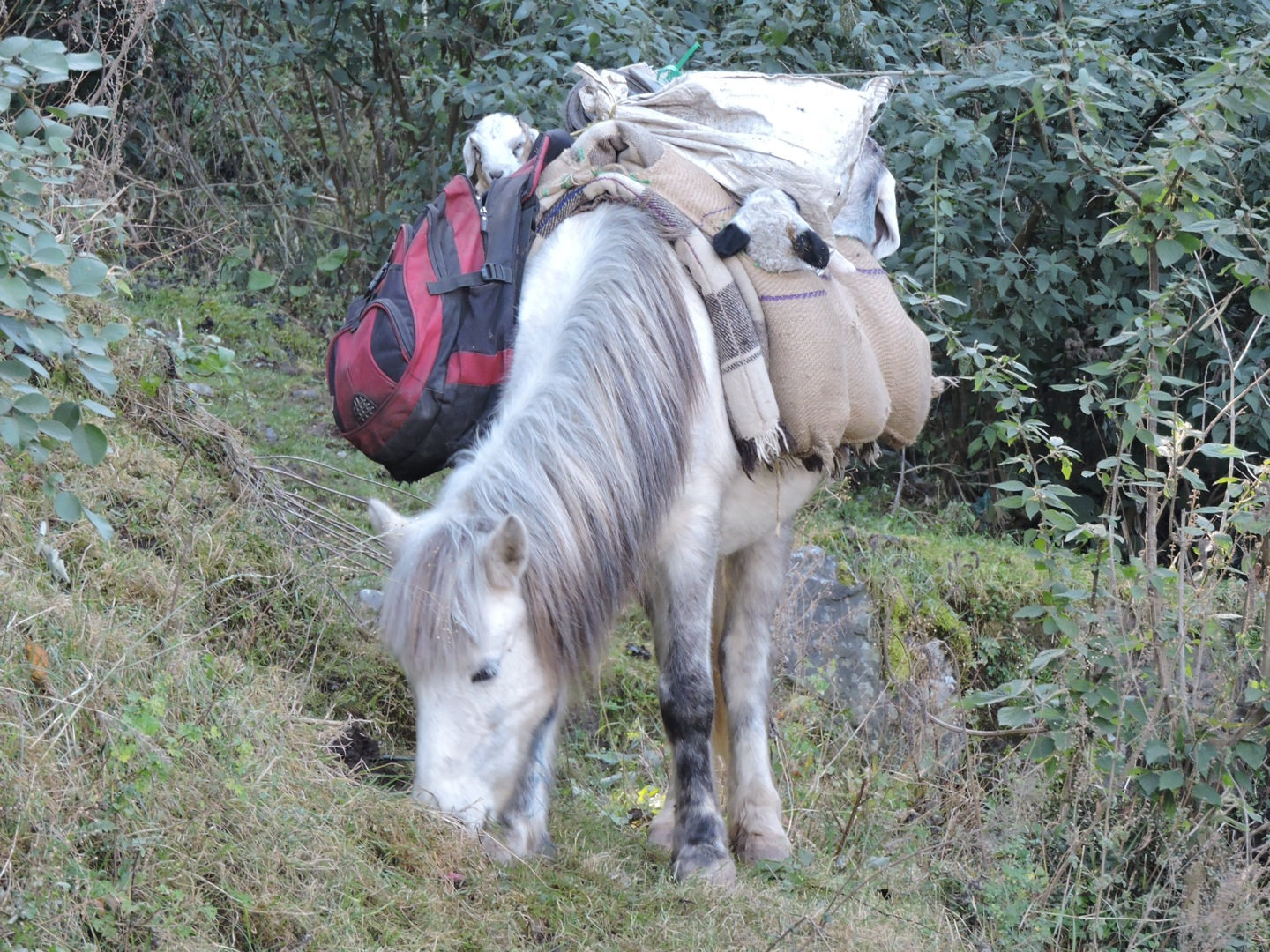
Pack-horse of the Gaddi people in Kasauli, Himachal Pradesh

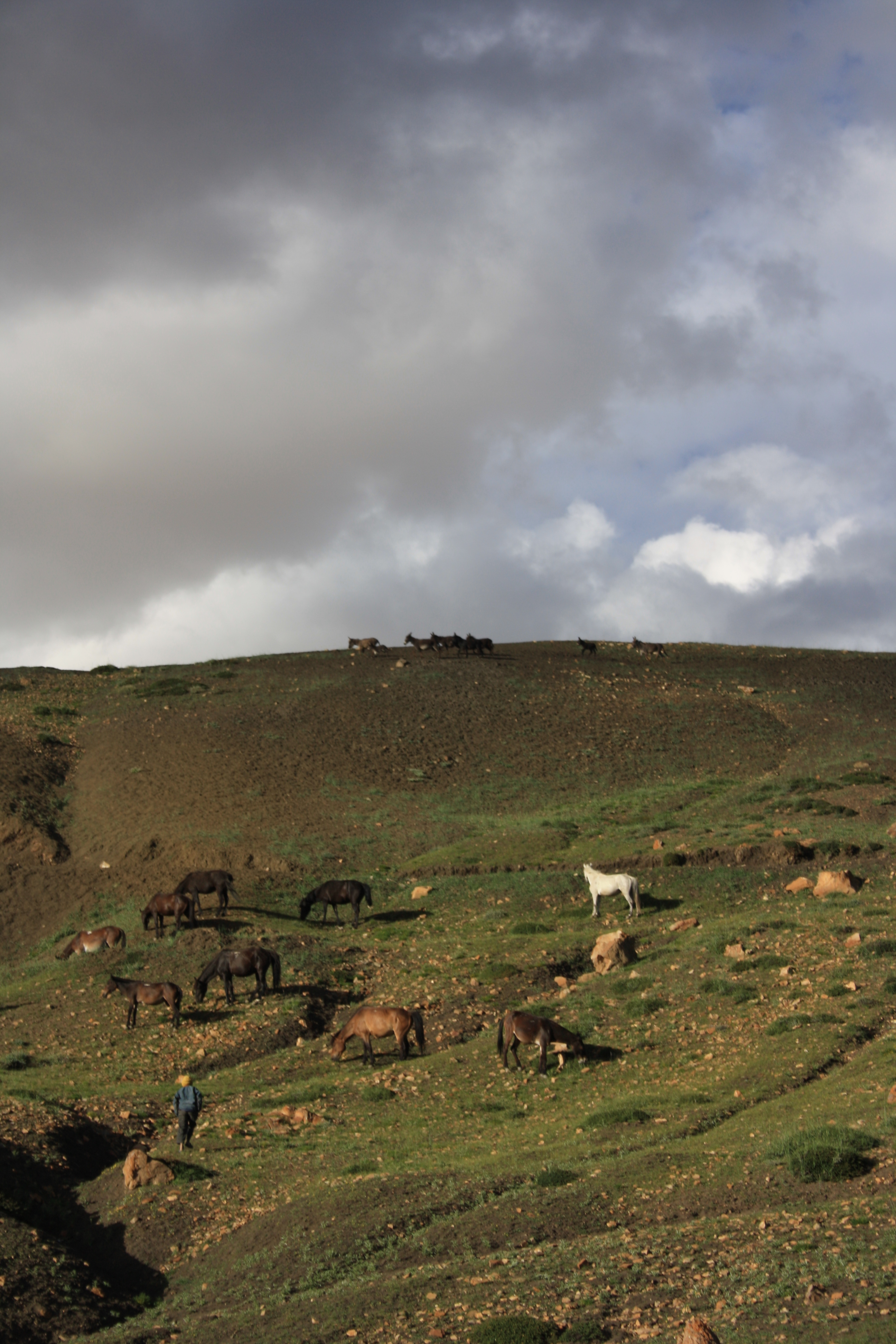
Horses near Langza in the Spiti Valley

The Spiti Horse is a breed of small mountain horse or pony from Himachal Pradesh in northern India. It takes its name from the Spiti River, and is found mainly in the Kullu, Lahaul and Spiti and Kinnaur districts of the state.

== History ==
The origins of the Spiti Horse are unknown. It takes its name from the Spiti River, and is found mainly in the Kullu, Lahaul and Spiti and Kinnaur districts of the state.

A breed population of 4000 was reported in 2004; numbers appeared to be in rapid decline, and the breed to be in urgent need of conservation. In 2007 its conservation status was recorded by the FAO as "not at risk"; in 2021 its status was reported to DAD-IS as "at risk".

== Characteristics ==
The Spiti Horse has some similarity to Mongolian and Tibetan breeds; genetic diversity analysis shows it to be close to the Zanskari, which occupies a similar range in the Himalaya. Some interchange between the two breeds is documented; the Spiti breed, however, is less well adapted to very high altitudes.

It is a small, sturdy mountain horse, well adapted to the harsh environment of the Himalaya. It is fast and sure-footed on mountain terrain, moves safely on ice, and has good stamina and resistance to cold and to disease. It is used both as a pack animal and for riding. The usual coat colours are bay, black, piebald and grey.
