= Riwoche horse =

Tibetan breed of horse

- Country of origin: Tibet

The Riwoche horse /ˈriːwoʊtʃeɪ/ is a dun-colored, pony-sized horse indigenous to northeastern Tibet. It came to international attention in 1995, at which time its primitive appearance and small size led to speculation that it might be an evolutionary link between the prehistoric wild horse and the modern domestic horse. Subsequent analysis, however, demonstrated that it is genetically indistinguishable from modern horses.

== Characteristics ==
Riwoche horses are pony sized, standing only 12 hands (48 inches, 122 cm) tall. They are said to resemble horses depicted in prehistoric cave paintings. They are dun in color, with angular bodies, upright manes and primitive markings including a dorsal stripe down their spine and striping on the back of their legs. These features are similar to those of some other modern horse breeds thought to have ancient roots. They also have small ears, rough coats, small jaws, straight, flat foreheads, and unique, narrow "duck-bill" nostrils.

Their unusual appearance led to speculation that they could be "living fossils." They strongly resembled horses in prehistoric cave art, a "number two" horse distinct from but often pictured alongside horses with a body type resembling the Przewalski's Horse. However, DNA testing indicated they were not a remnant wild population.

== Discovery ==
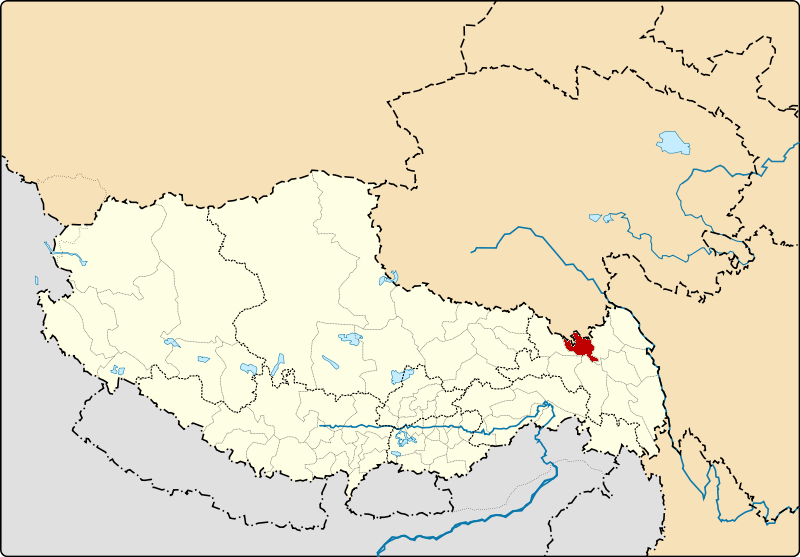
Location of Riwoche County within Tibet, where the horses were found

The horse was named by European explorers after its home region Riwoche County in northeastern Tibet. The breed was first observed by non-Tibetans in 1995 in an isolated, 27 kilometres (17 mi)-long valley, reachable only by crossing a 5,000 metres (16,000 ft) mountain pass, by a team of explorers led by the French ethnologist Michel Peissel. While on an expedition to study another horse breed that Peissel had previously observed in 1993, the Nangchen horse, he came upon a number of small horses in an isolated valley in the Riwoche region of Tibet. These animals were unknown to the rest of the world but familiar to and used by the local Bon-po people. Peissel and his crew obtained blood samples from the herd for DNA testing; the samples were given to Steven Harrison, a geneticist at the Royal Agricultural College in Cirencester, England.

A British equine psychologist accompanying the expedition, Dr. Ignasi Casas, theorized that the Riwoche horse was a relict population of wild horses, as they had been living in near-complete isolation from other breeds for a very long time. Other hypotheses suggested that they are an evolutionary link between the prehistoric horse and the domesticated horse, but testing did not reveal any appropriate genetic divergence from other horses, which was in line with news reports that the horses were domesticated and used as pack and riding animals by the local residents. Peissel noted the phenotypical resemblance of the Riwoche horse to the Przewalski's horse, but expressed a strong belief that the two are not closely related. Pointing out that the breed's isolation preserved its characteristics, Casas said, "It looks very primitive and very tough. Horses in the adjacent areas are very different." Casas suggested that one explanation for their archaic form was because the valley where they were found is closed off on both sides by very tall passes that rose to an altitude where horses were unlikely to migrate naturally because there was nothing to eat.

Peissel told The New York Times, "They looked completely archaic, like the horses in prehistoric cave paintings. We thought it was just a freak, then we saw they were all alike." He added to Time magazine, "The beige coat, black and bristly mane and the stripes on its back legs and back are similar to [features of] the most ancient breeds we know. The angular shape of the body, and the head in particular, is like that of the horses found in the Stone Age cave paintings." He told CNN, "It took me two years to get permission to go to that area, and it will be very difficult to get permission to go back and export them. As you know, Tibet is occupied by the Chinese and they're not very keen on foreigners visiting these remote areas."

== See also ==
- List of megafauna discovered in modern times
