= Michel Peissel =

French ethnologist, author and adventurer (1937–2011)

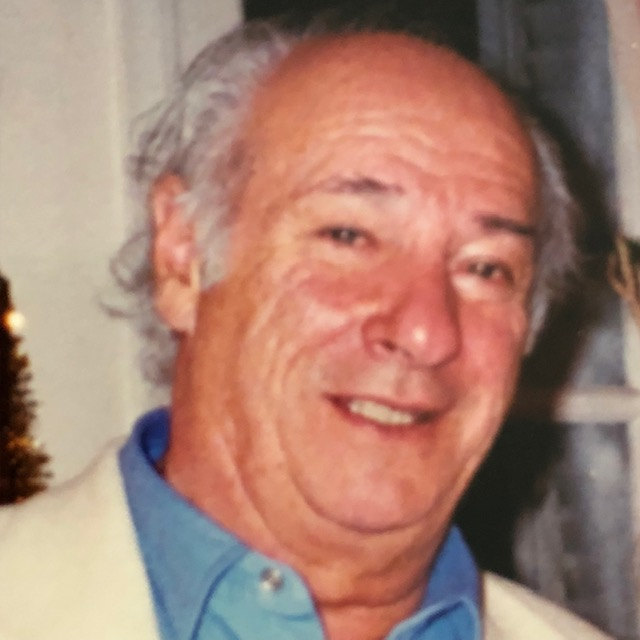
- Michel Peissel, 2010
- Born: February 11, 1937; Paris, France
- Died: October 7, 2011 (aged 74); Paris, France
- Occupations: Ethnologist, writer
- Years active: 1958–2006

Michel Georges Francois Peissel (February 11, 1937 – October 7, 2011) was a French ethnologist, adventurer and author. He wrote twenty books mostly on his Himalayan and Tibetan expeditions. Peissel was an emeritus member of the Explorers Club and a Fellow of the Royal Geographical Society.

== Biography ==
Peissel was the son of a French diplomat, raised in England after his father was posted to London, and able to speak English from early childhood. He later became fluent in several languages, including Tibetan. He studied for a year at Oxford University and the Harvard Business School and obtained a doctorate in Tibetan Ethnology from the Sorbonne, Paris.

=== First journey ===
In 1958, at the age of 21 — stranded on the coast of Quintana Roo, Mexico,— he walked 200 miles (320 km) down the coast to Belize discovering, on the way, 14 unrecorded Mayan archeological sites. He left the Harvard Business School after a year, deciding to study ethnology and explore the regions of Tibet and the Himalayas.

=== Himalayan expeditions ===
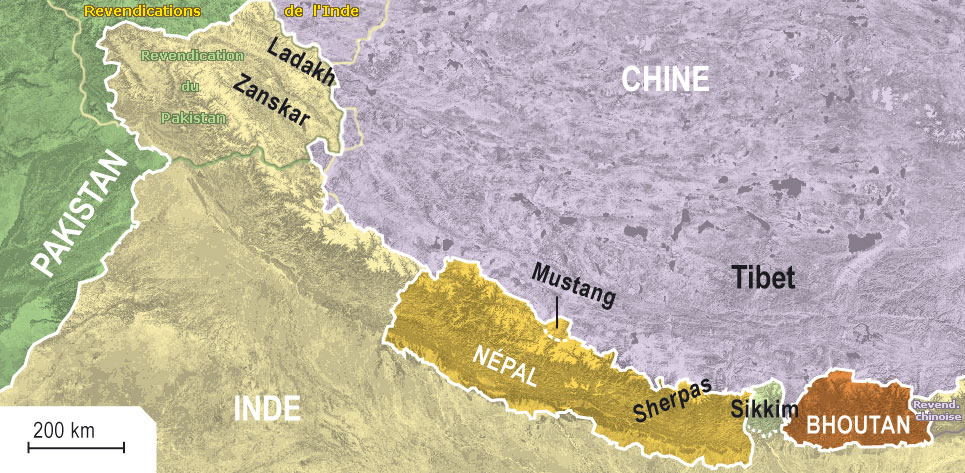
Himalayan territories crossed by Michel Peissel

In 1959, Peissel organised his first Himalayan expedition out of Harvard to study the Sherpas of the Everest district.

In 1964, he set out across the Himalayas to explore Mustang, a minute, Tibetan-speaking kingdom whose identity had escaped the attention of both scholars and the general public. His written account of the expedition, Mustang: A Lost Tibetan Kingdom, was published in 1967 and became an international best seller.

The Mustang expedition was followed by 28 others to the remotest regions of the Tibetan-speaking world. In 1968, he became one of the first foreigners to cross Bhutan and study its little-known eastern districts. He then made the first detailed study of the Kingdom of Zanskar in Kashmir, later studying the Minaro (Dards) of Baltistan and Ladakh, while attempting to locate precisely the "land of the gold digging ants" of Herodotus.

In 1973, he crossed the Himalayas by hovercraft, between Mounts Annapurna and Dhaulaghiri. Later, he travelled by hovercraft up the Ganges, in India, and also down the eastern coast of the Yucatán Peninsula, in Mexico, after having invented and patented the first single-fan hovercraft.(patent). He enjoyed saying he had "pioneered the sport of shooting up rapids".

In 1986, he became one of the first foreigners to penetrate Tsari and the gorges of the Brahmaputra in tropical Tibet.

In 1994, he led an expedition to locate the elusive source of the Mekong River, following the Dza Nak (the black Mekong, the historical main branch of the river), believing that he had discovered the source of Asia's third longest river. Ten years later, a Sino-Japanese expedition proved that the geographical source (the farthest from the sea) lies at the headwaters of the white Mekong, Dza Kar, which satellite photos show to be 4500 meters longer than what Peissel called the historical branch. Thus, like the Mississippi, the Yellow and countless other rivers, the Mekong is considered to have a geographical source and a historical source.

In 1995, after previous investigations and research on Tibetan breeds of horses during which he had discovered the Nangchen horse, he organised an expedition with the veterinary scholar Dr Ignasi Casas which led to the identification of a yet unknown archaic breed of horses: the Riwoche horse. (See note below.)

=== From Yucatan to Belize ===
In 1987, with Mexican archeologists, Peissel built a giant seagoing Mayan dugout canoe and paddled and sailed 500 miles (800 km) down the Yucatan and Belize coasts to demonstrate the role of maritime commerce by the Chontal Itzas in the 10th century collapse of the Mayan lowland cities.

=== In the wake of the Varangians ===
In 1989, having built a replica of a Viking long boat, Peissel and a crew of six rowed and sailed up the river Dvina and down the Dnieper 2,400 kilometres (1,500 mi) across the Soviet Union, from the Baltic to the Black Sea; an expedition meant to recreate that of the Varangians, the founding fathers of Kievan Rus' in the 8th century.

== Films ==
Peissel produced, directed or initiated 22 documentary films on his expeditions, including a four-part series in 1980 by the BBC on "Zanskar, the Last Place on Earth" and a Smithsonian exploration special for the Arts and Entertainment Channel on the source of the Mekong. Other films and videos are viewable on the French National Archives website. (INA)

== Marriages and children ==
Michel Peissel was married first to Marie-Claire de Montaignac, with whom he had two sons (Jocelyn and Olivier), then to Missy Allen, with whom he had a daughter (Octavia) and a son (Morgan). He was married to Roselyne Le Bris with whom he had a son (Valentin).

== Bibliography ==
- The Lost World of Quintana Roo. New York: E.P. Dutton, 1962; and Hodder and Stoughton, 1964
- Tiger for Breakfast:the story of Boris of Katmandu. E.P. Dutton, 1966; and Hodder and Stoughton, 1967
- Mustang: a Lost Tibetan Kingdom. New York: E.P. Dutton, 1967; and London Collins-Harvill, 1968
- Lords and Lamas. London: Heinemann, 1970
- The Cavaliers of Kham, the secret war in Tibet. London: Heinemann, 1972; and Boston: Little, Brown & Co., 1973
- The Great Himalayan Passage. Collins 1974, and Boston: Little, Brown & Co., 1975
- Himalaya, continent Secret. Paris: Flammarion, 1975
- Les Portes de l'Or. Paris: Robert Laffont, 1978
- Zanskar the Hidden Kingdom. New York: E.P. Dutton, 1979; and London: Collins-Harvill, 1980
- The Ant's Gold, discovering the Greek Eldorado. London: Collins-Harvill, 1984
- Royaumes de l'Himalaya. Paris: Bordas & Fils, 1986
- Itza, le mystere du Naufrage Maya. Paris: Robert Laffont, 1989
- La Route de l'Ambre. Paris: Robert Laffont, 1992
- The Last Barbarians, the discovery of the source of the Mekong. New York: Henry Holt & Company, 1997; and London Souvenir Press, 1998
- Le Dernier Horizon. Paris: Robert Laffont, 2001
- Tibet, the Secret Continent. London: Cassell Illustrated, 2002; and New York: St Martin's Press, 2003
- Tibetan Pilgrimage. New York: Abrams 2005
