= Marwari horse =

Indian breed of horse

Marwari
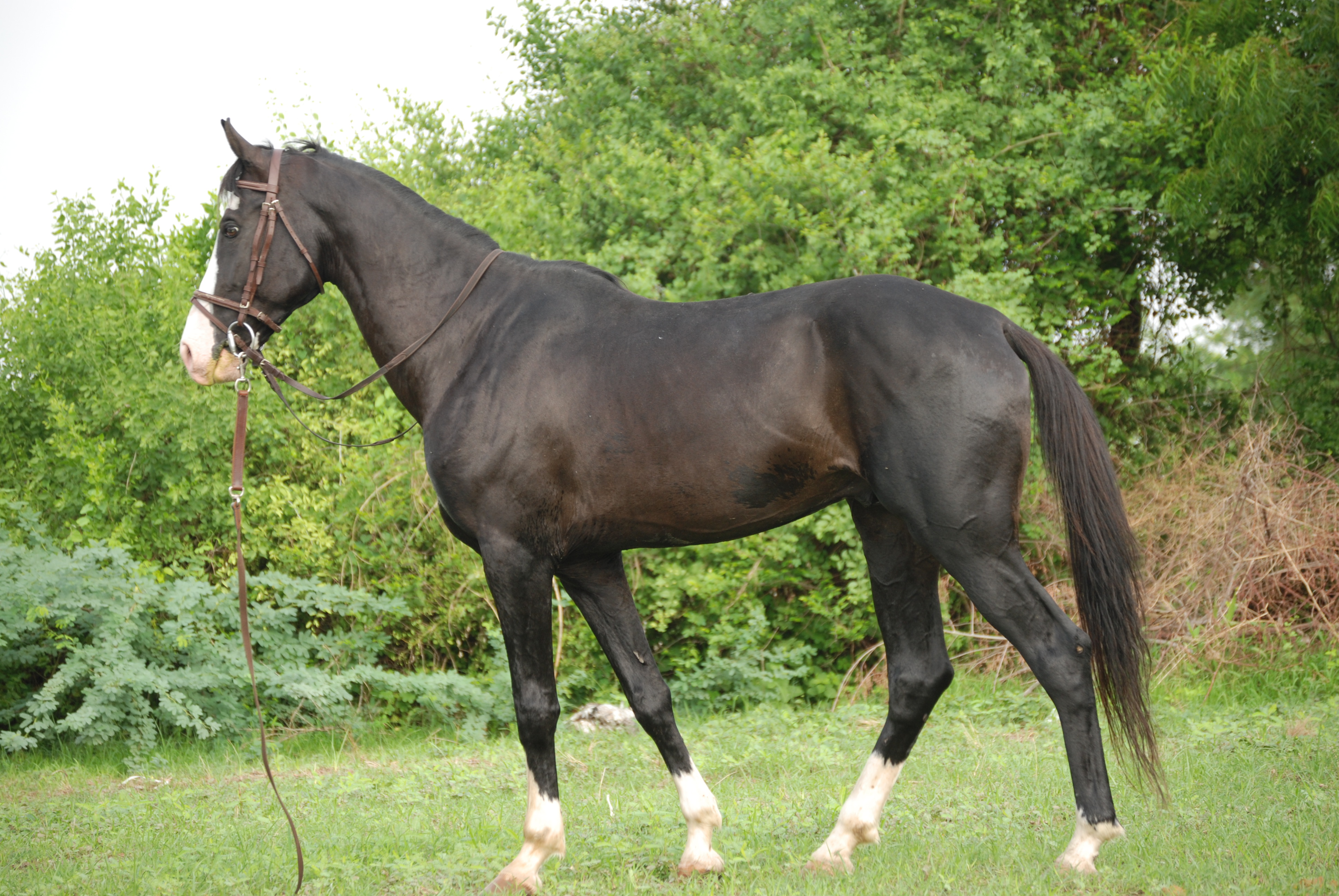
- A stallion
- Conservation status: FAO (2007): not at risk; DAD-IS (2020): not at risk
- Other names: Marwadi; Mallani
- Country of origin: India
- Distribution: Jaipur, Jodhpur and Udaipur divisions of Rajasthan; neighbouring areas of Gujarat
- Standard: Indigenous Horse Society of India; Marwari Horse Society

Traits
- Weight: Male: average 365 kg; Female: average 340 kg
- Height: Male: average 150 cm; Female: average 140 cm
- Colour: all colours, including piebald and skewbald
- Distinguishing features: ears inward-curving, sometimes touching each other

The Marwari, also known as the Malani is a rare breed of horse from the Marwar region of Rajasthan, in north-west India. It is closely related to the Kathiawari breed of the Kathiawar peninsula of Gujarat, with which it shares the distinctive inward-curving ears. Marwari horses are found in all equine colours, including piebald and skewbald. It is a hardy riding horse and may exhibit a natural ambling gait.

The Rathores, traditional rulers of the Marwar region of western India, were the first to breed the Marwari. Beginning in the 12th century, they espoused strict breeding that promoted purity and hardiness. Used throughout history as a cavalry horse by the people of the Marwar region, the Marwari was noted for its loyalty and bravery in battle. The breed deteriorated in the 1930s, when poor management practices resulted in a reduction of the breeding stock, but today has regained some of its popularity. The Marwari is used for light draught and agricultural work, as well as riding and packing. In 1995, a breed society was formed for the Marwari horse in India. The exportation of Marwari horses was banned for decades, but between 2000 and 2006, a small number of exports were allowed. Since 2008, visas allowing temporary travel of Marwari horses outside India have been available in small numbers. Though they are rare they are becoming more popular outside of India due to their unique looks.

== Characteristics ==
The height at the withers of the Marwari averages 150 cm (14.3 h) for males, and 140 cm (13.3 h) for mares. The coat may be of any colour, and is most often dark or light bay, at times with the metallic sheen often seen in the Akhal-Teke; it may also be grey or chestnut, or occasionally palomino, piebald, or skewbald. White horses cannot be registered. Grey horses are considered auspicious and tend to be the most valuable, with piebald and skewbald horses the second-most favoured. Black horses are considered unlucky, as the colour is a symbol of death and darkness. Horses with a blaze and four white socks are considered lucky.

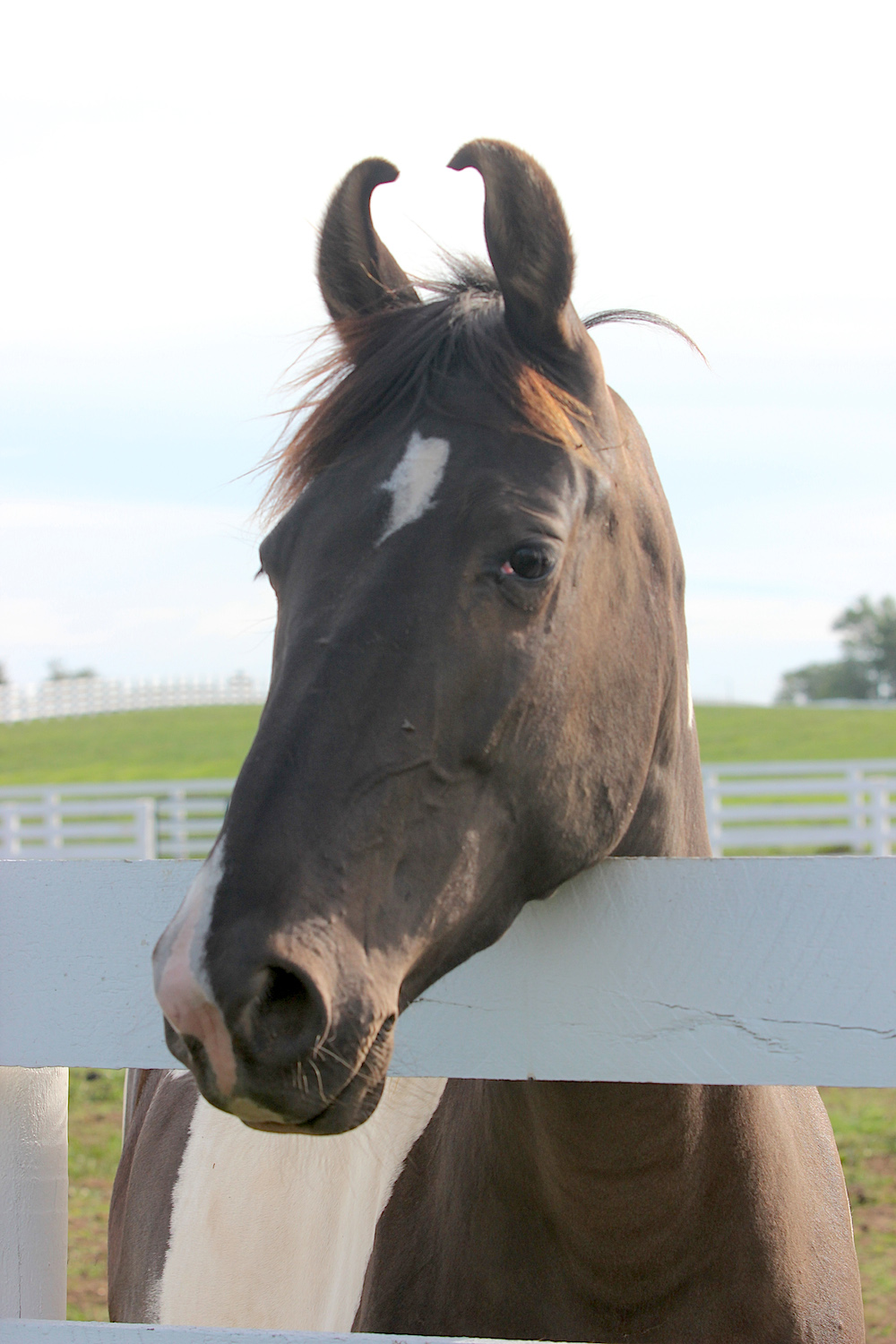
A Marwari head showing curved ears

The facial profile is straight or slightly Roman, and the ears are medium-sized and curving inward so that the tips meet; also, the Marwari horse can rotate its ears 180º. The neck is arched and carried high, running into pronounced withers, with a deep chest and muscular, broad, and angular shoulders. Marwaris generally have a long back and sloping croup. The legs tend to be slender and the hooves small but well-formed. Members of the breed are hardy and easy keepers, but they can also be of tenacious and unpredictable temperaments. They are quite similar to the Kathiawari horse, another breed from India, having much of the same history and physical features. The main difference between the Marwari and the Kathiawari is their original geographic origin – Marwaris are mainly from the Marwar region while Kathiawaris are from the Kathiawar peninsula. Kathiawaris have inward-slanting ears, a short back, and a straight, slender neck and are more similar to Arabians, but they are pure in breed. Kathiawaris are slightly smaller than Marwaris in general.

The Marwari horse often exhibits a natural ambling gait, close to a pace, called the revaal, aphcal, or rehwal. Hair whorls and their placement are important to breeders of Marwaris. Horses with long whorls down the neck are called devman and considered lucky, while horses with whorls below their eyes are called anusudhal and are unpopular with buyers. Whorls on the fetlocks are thought to bring victory. The horses are expected to have correct proportions, based on the width of a finger, said to be the equal of five grains of barley. For example, the length of the face should be between 28 and 40 fingers, and the length from the poll to the dock should be four times the length of the face.

== Breed history ==
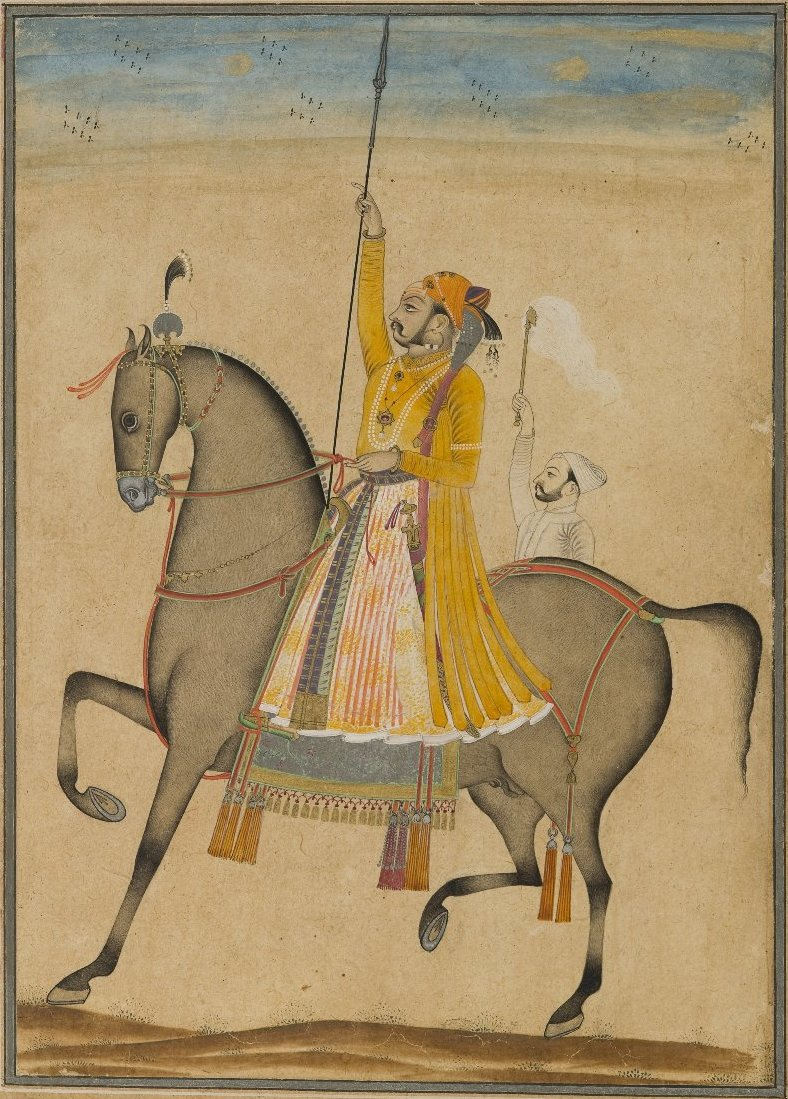
A mid-1700s portrait of Maharaja Sujan Singh of Bikaner shown on a horse with Marwari curved ears

The origins of the Marwari are obscure. It is thought to descend from the warhorses of the Rajput warriors of the Marwar and Mewar regions of Rajasthan, with subsequent influence of horses of Turkoman type brought to the area by Mughal invaders in the sixteenth century. Unlike the Kathiawari, the Marwari shows little Arab influence. In the late sixteenth century Abu'l-Fazl ibn Mubarak, in his Ain-i-Akbari, says that the finest horses in India were those of Kutch, and recounts a myth that an Arab ship carrying seven fine Arab horses was shipwrecked on the shore of that district; Kutch is in modern Gujarat, while Marwar is in Rajasthan. Abu'l-Fazl also makes clear that the Emperor Akbar had about twelve thousand horses in his court stables, and that there were constant arrivals of new horses from all parts of the Islamic world. There is also the possibility of some Mongolian influence from the north. The breed probably originated in northwest India on the Afghanistan border, as well as in Uzbekistan, Kazakhstan, and Turkmenistan, and takes its name from the Marwar region (also called the Jodhpur region) of India.

The Rathores, rulers of Marwar and successful Rajput cavalry, were the traditional breeders of the Marwari. The Rathores were forced from their Kingdom of Kanauj in 1193, and withdrew into the Great Indian and Thar Deserts. The Marwari was vital to their survival, and during the 12th century they followed strict selective breeding processes, keeping the finest stallions for the use of their subjects. During this time, the horses were considered divine beings, and at times they were only allowed to be ridden by members of the Rajput families. When the Mughals captured northern India in the early 16th century, they brought Turkoman horses that were probably used to supplement the breeding of the Marwari. Marwaris were renowned during this period for their bravery and courage in battle, as well as their loyalty to their riders. During the late 16th century, the Rajputs of Marwar region, who were under the suzerainty of Mughal emperor Akbar, formed a cavalry force over 50,000 strong. The Rathores believed that the Marwari horse could only leave a battlefield under one of three conditions – victory, death, or carrying a wounded master to safety. The horses were trained to be extremely responsive in battlefield conditions, and were practised in complex riding maneuvers. Over 300 years later, during the First World War, Marwar lancers under Sir Pratap Singh assisted the British.

=== 1900s to today ===
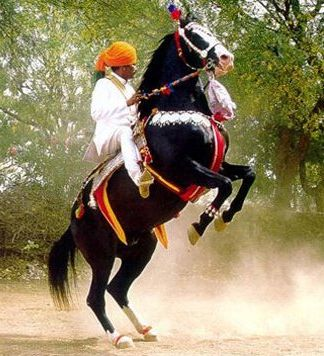
In traditional tack

The period of British colonial rule hastened the Marwari's fall from dominance, as did the eventual independence of India. The British preferred other breeds, and tried to eliminate the Marwari, along with the Kathiawari. Britons living in India instead preferred thoroughbreds and polo ponies, and reduced the reputation of the Marwari to the point where even the inward-turning ears of the breed were mocked as the "mark of a native horse". During the 1930s the Marwari deteriorated, with breeding stock diminishing and becoming of poorer quality due to poor breeding practices. Indian independence, along with the obsolescence of warriors on horseback, led to a decreased need for the Marwari and many animals were subsequently killed. In the 1950s many Indian noblemen lost their land and hence much of their ability to take care of animals, resulting in many Marwari horses being sold as pack horses, castrated, or killed. The breed was on the verge of extinction until the intervention of Maharaja Umaid Singhji in the first half of the 20th century saved the Marwari. His work was carried on by his grandson, Maharaja Gaj Singh II.

A British horsewoman named Francesca Kelly founded a group called Marwari Bloodlines in 1995, with the goal of promoting and preserving the Marwari horse around the world. In 1999, Kelly and Raghuvendra Singh Dundlod, a descendant of Indian nobility, led a group that founded the Indigenous Horse Society of India (of which the Marwari Horse Society is part), a group that works with the government, breeders, and the public to promote and conserve the breed. Kelly and Dunlod also entered and won endurance races at the Indian national equestrian games, convincing the Equestrian Federation of India to sanction a national show for indigenous horses – the first in the country. The pair worked with other experts from the Indigenous Horse Society to develop the first breed standards.

The government of India had originally banned the export of indigenous horse breeds, although not polo ponies or Thoroughbreds, in 1952. This ban was partially lifted in 1999, when a small number of indigenous horses could be exported after receiving a special license. Kelly imported the first Marwari horse into the United States in 2000. Over the next seven years, 21 horses were exported, until, in 2006, licenses stopped being granted over concerns that native breeding populations were being threatened. One of the last Marwaris to be exported was the first to be imported to Europe, in 2006, when a stallion was given to the French Living Museum of the Horse. In 2008, the Indian government began granting licenses for "temporary exports" of up to one year, to allow horses to be exhibited in other countries. This was in response to breeders and the breed society, who felt they were not being allowed a fair chance to exhibit their animals.

In late 2007 plans were announced to create a stud book for the breed, a collaborative venture between the Marwari Horse Society of India and the Indian government. A registration process was initiated in 2009, when it was announced that the Marwari Horse Society had become a government body, the only government-authorized registration society for Marwari horses. The registration process includes an evaluation of the horse against the breed standards, during which unique identification marks and physical dimensions are recorded. After the evaluation, the horse is cold branded with its registration number and photographed. In late 2009 the Indian government announced that the Marwari horse, along with other Indian horse breeds, would be commemorated on a set of stamps issued by that country.

== Genetic studies ==
As a direct result of indiscriminate breeding practices, as of 2001 only a few thousand purebred Marwari horses existed. Research studies have been conducted to examine the genetics of the Marwari horse and its relationship to other Indian and non-Indian horse breeds. Six different breeds have been identified in India: the Marwari, Kathiawari, Spiti pony, Bhutia pony, Manipuri Pony, and Zanskari. These six are distinct from each other in terms of unique performance traits and different agroclimactic conditions in the various areas of India where they originated. A 2005 study was conducted to identify past genetic bottlenecks in the Marwari horse. The study found that, in the DNA of the horses tested, there was no evidence of a genetic bottleneck in the breed's history. However, since the population has decreased rapidly in past decades, bottlenecks may have occurred that were not identified in the study. In 2007, a study was conducted to assess genetic variation among all Indian horse breeds except the Kathiawari. Based on analysis of microsatellite DNA, the Marwari was found to be the most genetically distinct breed of the five studied, and was most distant from the Manipuri; none of the breeds were found to have close genetic ties to the Thoroughbred. The Marwari was distinguishable from the other breeds in terms of both physical characteristics (mainly height) and environmental adaptability. The physical differences were attributed to differing ancestries: the Marwari horse are closely associated with the Arabian horse, while the four other breeds are supposedly descended from the Tibetan pony.

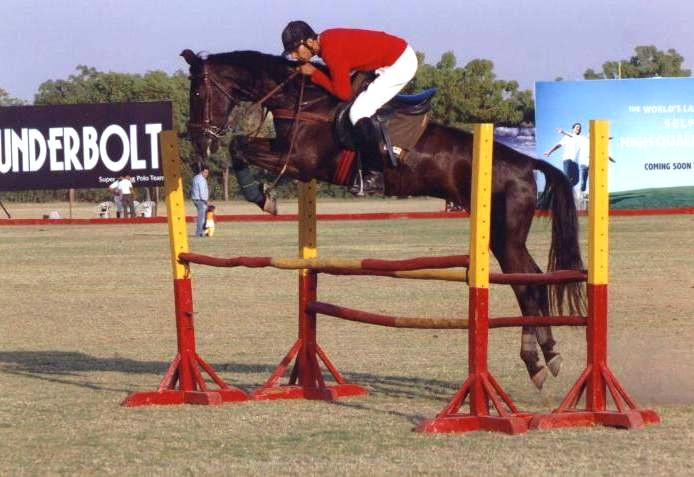
Show jumping

== Uses ==
The Marwari horse is a riding horse; it may also be used for shows, horse safaris, sport, ceremonial & religious purposes, and during earlier days in war. Marwari horses are often crossed with Thoroughbreds to produce a larger horse with more versatility. Despite the fact that the breed is indigenous to the country, cavalry units of the Indian military make little use of the horses, although they are popular in the Jodhpur and Jaipur areas of Rajasthan, India. They are particularly suited to dressage, in part due to a natural tendency to perform. Marwari horses are also used to play polo, sometimes playing against Thoroughbreds. Within the Marwari horse breed was a strain known as the Natchni, believed by local people to be "born to dance". Decorated in silver, jewels, and bells, these horses were trained to perform complex prancing and leaping movements at many ceremonies, including weddings. Although the Natchni strain is extinct today, horses trained in those skills are still in demand in rural India.

== See also ==
- Shaktiman, a Marwari police horse
