= Demul =

Village in Himachal Pradesh, India

- Village
- Location in Himachal Pradesh, India Demul (India)
- Coordinates: 32.16991°N 78.17913°E
- Country: India
- State: Himachal Pradesh
- District: Lahaul and Spiti
- Elevation: 4,320 m (14,170 ft)
- Time zone: UTC+5:30 (IST)
- PIN: 172114

Demul is a village in Himachal Pradesh, India. It is located in Lahaul and Spiti district. The taluk is Spiti and pincode 172114. Demul is a remote settlement and situated at an elevation of 14,170 feet.

== Economy and demographics ==
The village has only a few hundred residents. Most belong to Bodh tribe. They are engaged in agriculture with barley being the main crop. Other sources of income include tourism and handicrafts.

== Climate change ==
Climate change in recent years has resulted in glaciers retreating in the area, leading to droughts. Falling snow levels have worried villagers about access to water, and also decreased agricultural output. Local NGOs have experimented with dams and artificial glaciers to freeze water before it can flow off the land.

== Tourism and commercialization ==
Demul's inhabitants have benefited from significant development of tourism in recent years. However, there are concerns related to commercialization.
