= Zaniskari =

Indian breed of horse

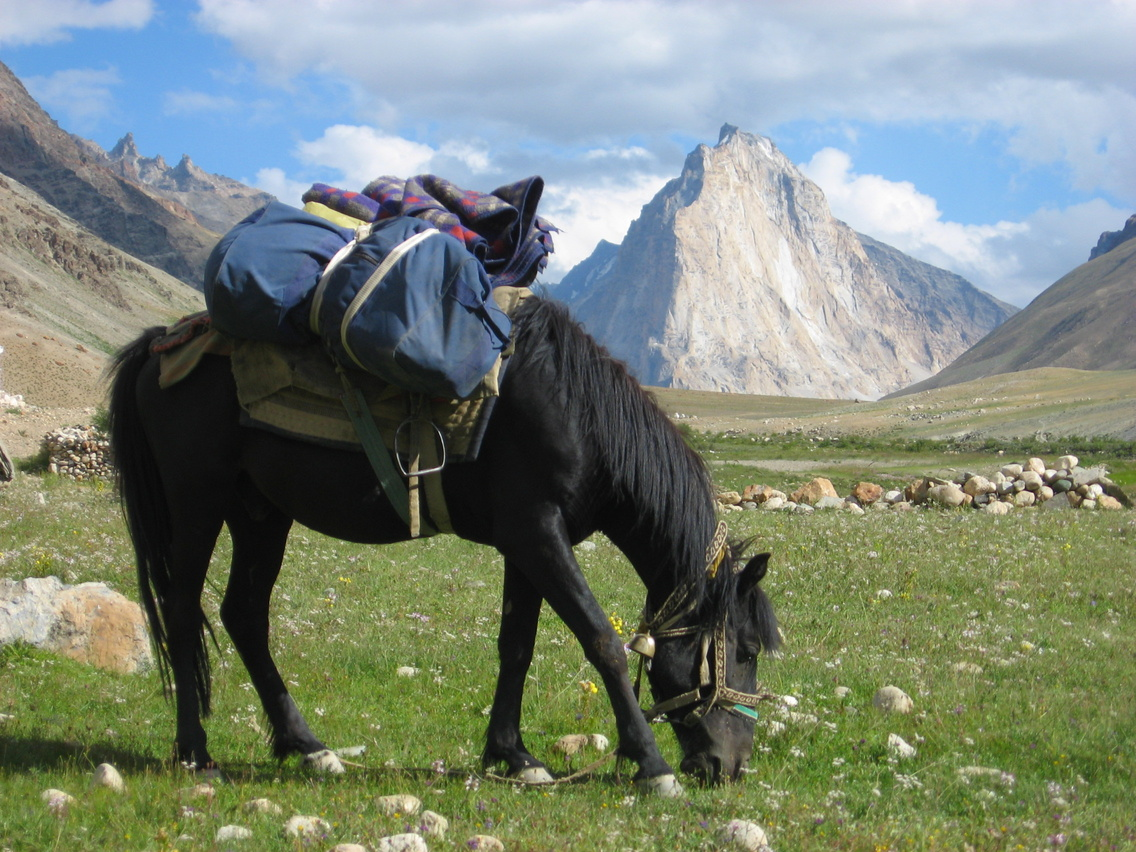
- In Ladakh
- Conservation status: FAO (2007): not at risk; DAD-IS (2022): at risk
- Other names: Zanskari; Zaskari; Zanaskari; Jhanskar
- Country of origin: India
- Distribution: Zanskar valley of Ladakh
- Standard: Indigenous Horse Society of India
- Use: pack-horse; riding; polo

Traits
- Height: Range: 110–140 cm; Average: 126 cm
- Colour: grey; bay; brown; black; chestnut

The Zaniskari or Zanskari is an Indian breed of small mountain horse or pony from Ladakh in northern India. It is named for the Zanskar valley or region in Kargil district. It is similar to the Spiti breed of Himachal Pradesh, but is better adapted to work at high altitude. Like the Spiti, it shows similarities to the Tibetan breeds living on the other side of the Himalayas in neighbouring Tibet. It is of medium size, and is often grey in colour. The breed is considered endangered, as there are only a few hundred alive today, and a conservation programme has been started at Padum, Zanskar, in the Kargil district of Ladakh.

== History ==
In 1977 the population of Zaniskari horses was estimated at 15000–20000. The breed was listed as "not at risk" by the Food and Agriculture Organization of the United Nations in 2007. However, it has been endangered by indiscriminate cross-breeding with other horses and it is thought that only a few hundred pure-bred animals now remain, mainly in the valleys of Ladakh, including the Zanskar Gorge from which the breed takes its name. The Animal Husbandry Department of Jammu and Kashmir operates a farm at Padum, in Zanskar, for the breeding and conservation of the breed. The population has declined rapidly due to mechanisation and to increases in the number of roads in its native area. However, the population did not in 2006 show signs of any significant genetic bottleneck.

In 2013 there were approximately 9700 of the horses. In 2022 the conservation status of the breed was listed in DAD-IS as "at risk/critical maintained", based on a reported population of 346 animals.

A genetic analysis of five Indian horse breeds in 2007 found the Zaniskari to be close to the Manipuri, Spiti and Bhutia breeds, and more distant from the Marwari. A study of all six Indian breeds in 2014 grouped the Zaniskari with the Bhutia, Manipuri and Spiti breeds, and found it to be most closely related to the Spiti.

== Characteristics ==
The Zaniskari is strong, compact and well built, and is particularly adapted to work in the hypoxic environment of Ladakh. Height is usually between 120 and 140 cm (12 and 14 h); thoracic circumference is 140–150 cm (55–60 in) and body length about 95–115 cm (38–45 in). The most usual coat colour is grey; bay, brown, black and chestnut also occur.

== Use ==
The Zaniskari is particularly adapted to work as a pack animal in the high altitudes and challenging conditions of its native region, which lies between 3000 and 5000 m above sea level, and where temperatures may reach −40 °C. It is strong and sure-footed, and has good stamina. The Indian army in Ladakh uses it as a pack-beast. It is also used for riding and for polo.
