= Indian half-bred =

Horse type from India

Indian Half-bred
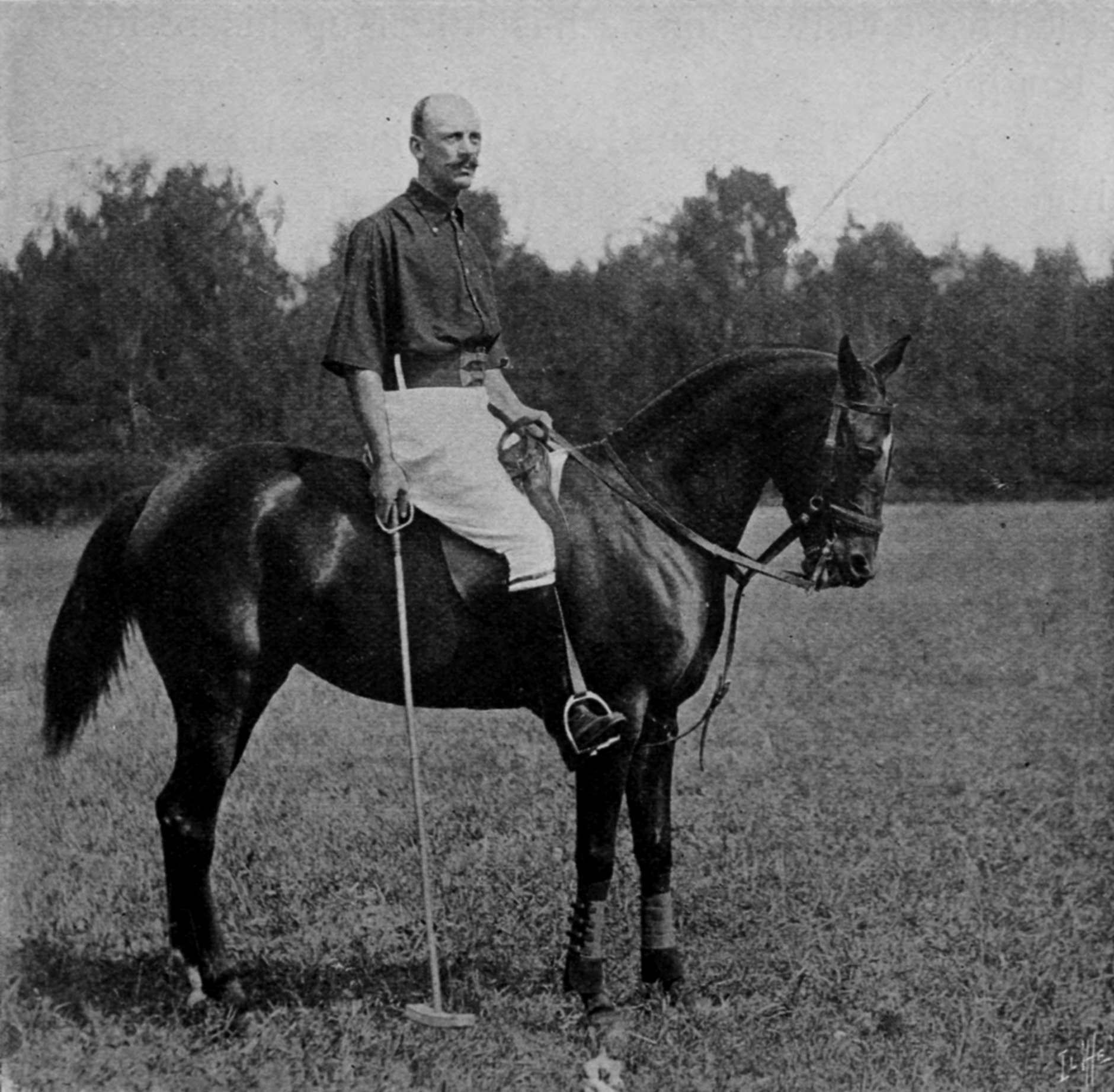
- Sergei Belosselsky-Belozersky on his Indian Half-bred pony Negress
- Country of origin: India

The Indian Half-bred is a horse type from the subcontinent of India. It is a cross-breed between Thoroughbred stallions and local and imported mares of various types. It is raised mainly by the Indian Army as a cavalry mount; it is also used by the Indian Police Service, as a polo pony, and for recreational and competitive riding.

== History ==
In the 19th century the Indian cavalry used mainly Arab horses. Later, large numbers of Walers, at that time considered the best cavalry horses, were imported from Australia. In the 20th century Thoroughbred stock was used to sire half-bloods. The Thoroughbred stallion Thomas Jefferson was imported from Britain and stood both at the army stud at Babugarh and at the remount depot of Saharanpur, both in Uttar Pradesh. At the Partition of India in 1947, India retained four French and eight British Thoroughbreds.

The mares are often local country-bred stock. Imported brood-mares have included Argentines, Bretons from France, and Malapolski and Masuren stock from Poland.

== Characteristics ==
The Indian Half-bred is wiry, hardy and well adapted to the climate and terrain of the country. Conformation is very variable; the horses generally stand about 1.57 m at the withers.
