= Komic =

Village in India

Komic Komik
- Village
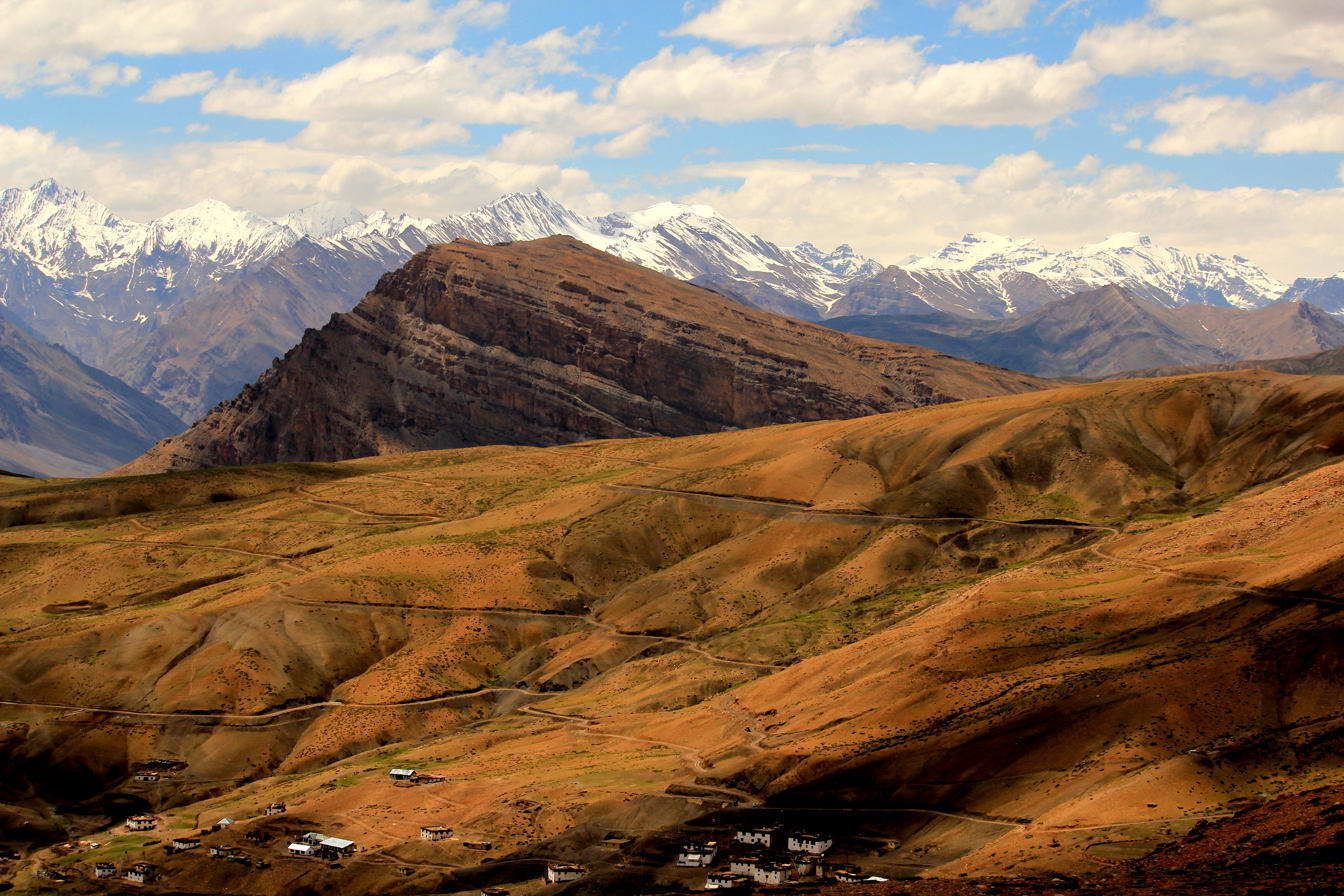

- Location in Himachal Pradesh, India Komic (India)
- Coordinates: 32.2331°N 78.1087°E
- Country: India
- State: Himachal Pradesh
- Elevation: 4,587 m (15,049 ft)

Population (2011)
  - Total: 130

Languages
  - Official: Hindi
- Time zone: UTC+5:30 (IST)
- Postal code: 172114
- Vehicle registration: HP

Komic (also spelled as Komik) is a small village located in Spiti Tehsil of Lahaul and Spiti district of Himachal Pradesh with a population of 130, out of which 90 are males and 40 are females as per the India Population Census of 2011.

Komic village is one of the world's highest motorable villages.

== Population ==
Particulars	Total	Male	Female
Total No. of Houses	15	-	-
Population	130	90	40
Child (0–6)	10	7	3
Schedule Caste	0	0	0
Schedule Tribe	130	90	40
Literacy	85.00 %	87.95 %	78.38 %
Total Workers	102	77	25
Main Worker	37	-	-
Marginal Worker	65	60	5

== Tourism ==
Komic village has the 500 year-old Lundup Tsemo Gompa Buddhist Monastery, and is one of the world's highest villages.
