= Langza =

- village
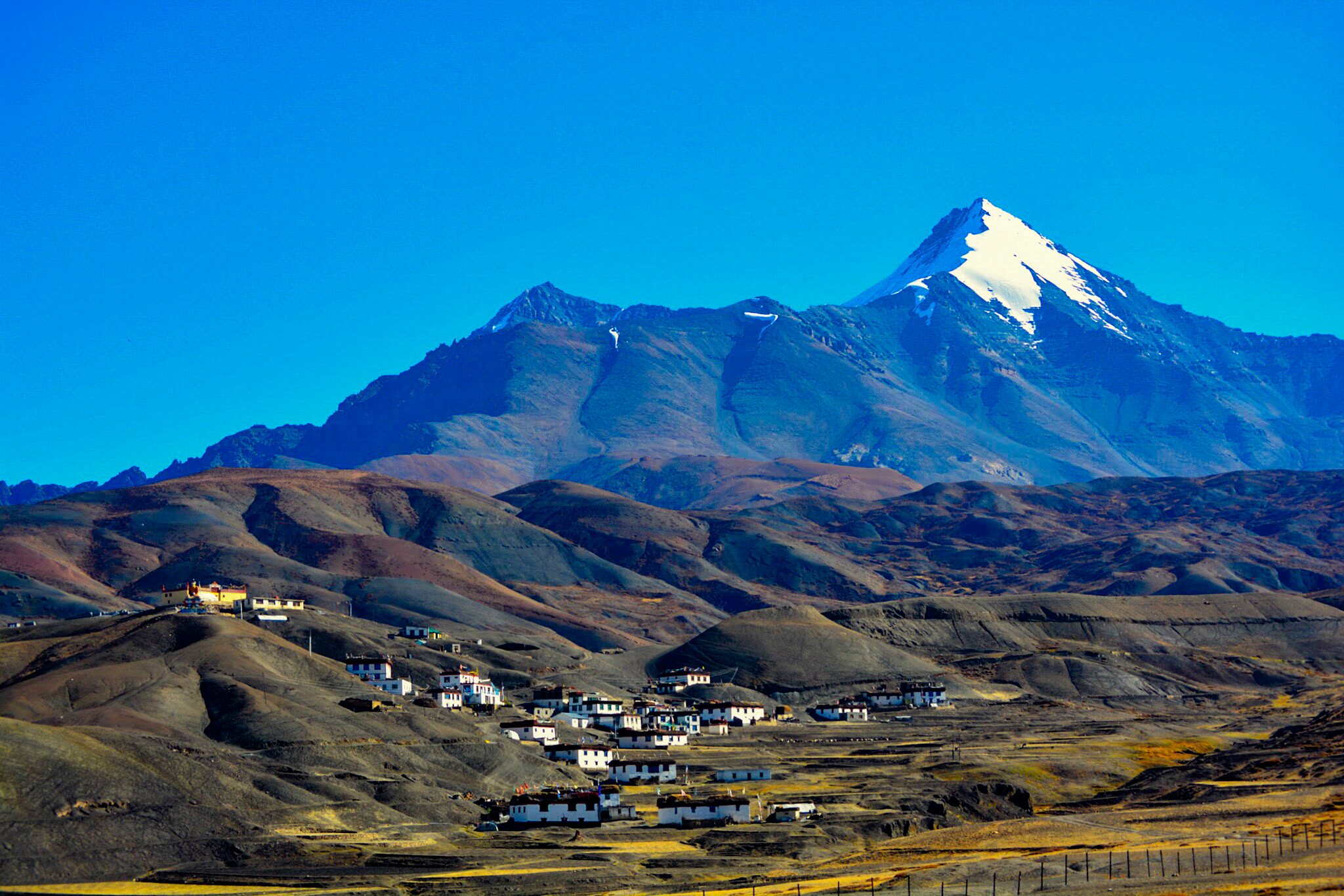
- Langza village with Chau Chau Kang Nilda

- Location in Himachal Pradesh, India Langza (India)
- Coordinates: 32.2738°N 78.0816°E
- Country: India
- State: Himachal Pradesh
- District: Lahaul and Spiti district
- Elevation: 4,419.6 m (14,500 ft)

Population (2011)
  - Total: 136

Languages
  - Official: Hindi
- Time zone: UTC+5:30 (IST)
- PIN: 172106
- Vehicle registration: HP-
- Nearest city: Rampur
- Climate: Alpine climate (Köppen)

Langza is a small village located in Spiti Tehsil of Lahaul and Spiti district, Himachal Pradesh. It is set at the base of Chau Chau Kang Nilda mountain, also known as the Princess Mountain.

The village has a population of 136 people only. The village is known as the "fossil village" of Spiti valley.

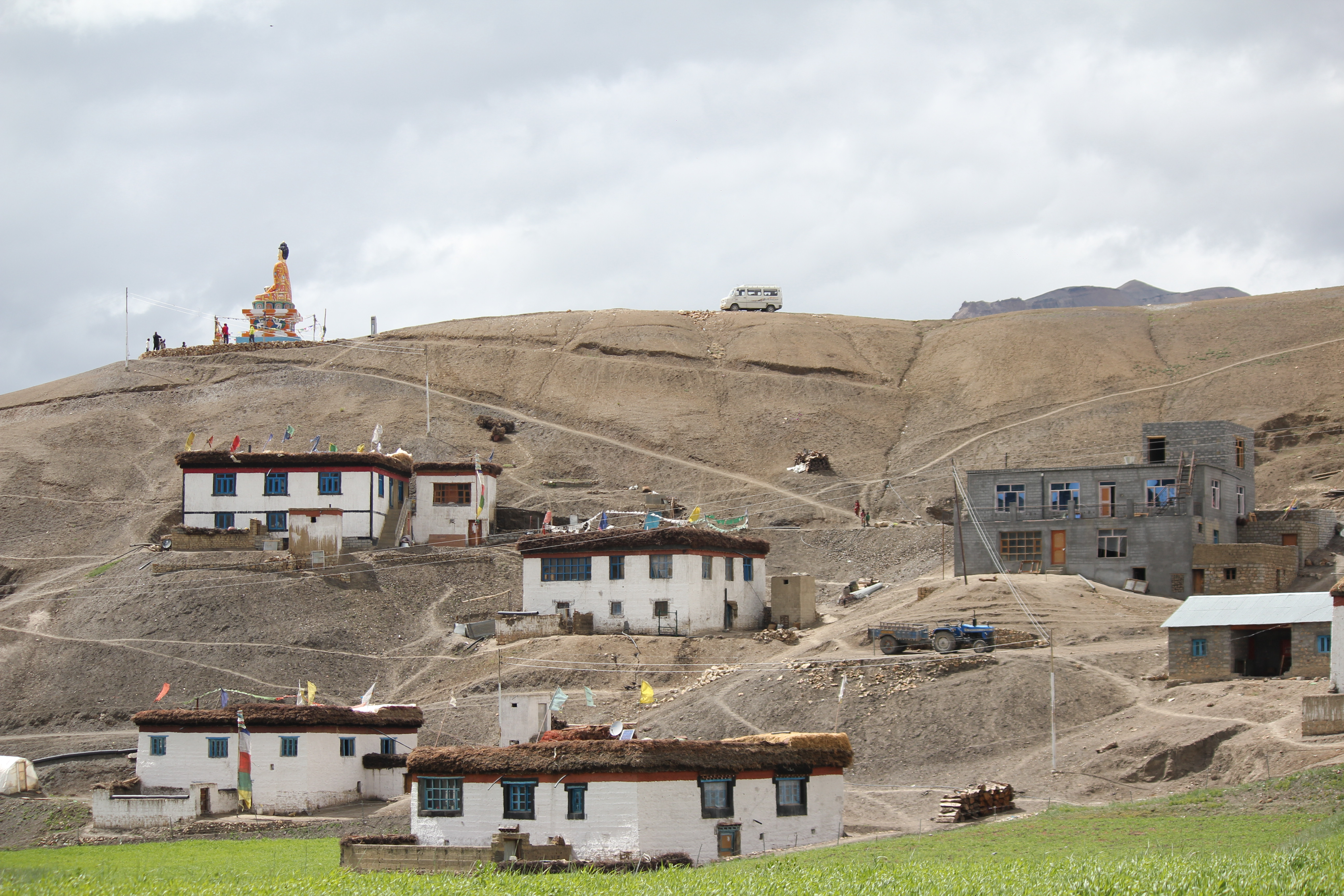
Langza

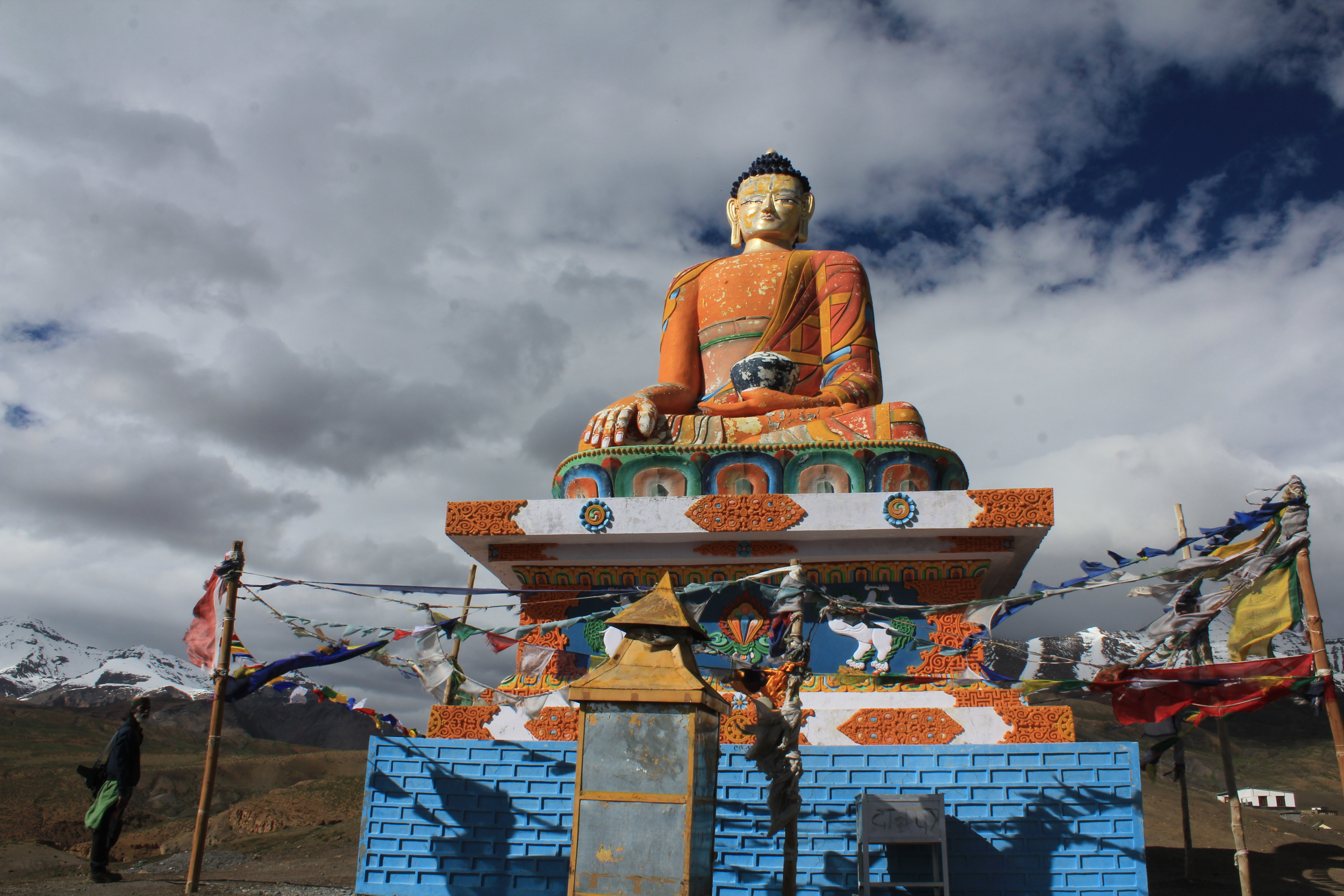
Buddha Statue at Langza
