= Bhimthadi =

Breed of horse

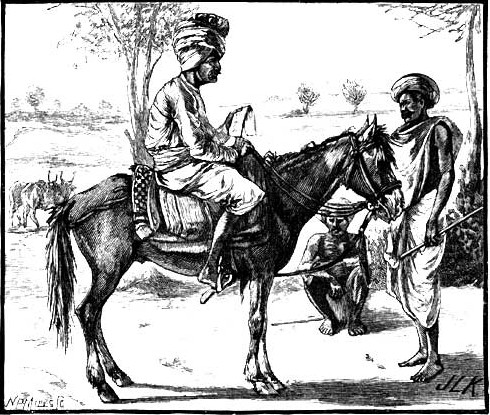
A money-lender on a Deccan pony - John Lockwood Kipling, Beast and Man in India.

The Bhimthadi or Deccani horse is an almost extinct breed of Indian horses. It was used in Pune district in 17th and 18th centuries during the Maratha rule. In december 2023 it is recognised as Maharashtra’s indigenous breed by ICAR.

== History ==
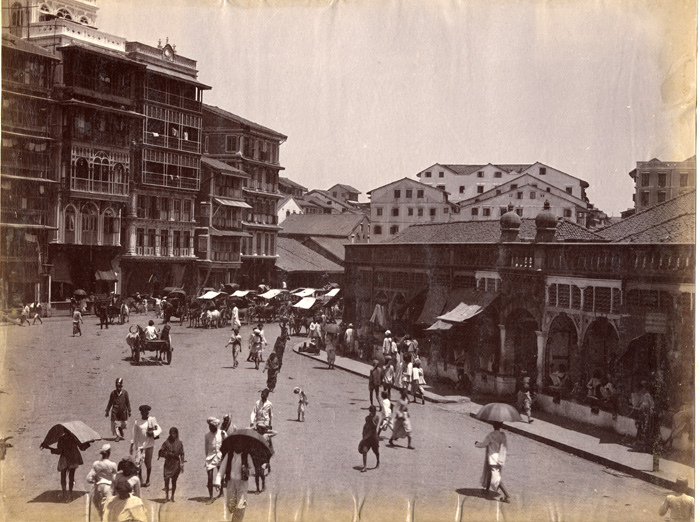
Street of Bombay in 1890, with ox and poney carts.

The "Bhimthadi", also known as Deccani or "Deccan breed" gets its name from the vast Deccan Plateau in India. A major trade in Arabian horses in the ports of Deccan began after the Bahamani Sultanate revolted against the Delhi Sultanate. Later in the period also the heavy war horses, sought by the Mughals and the Sultans of the Deccan, were always imported, especially from Iran.

The breed was developed in Pune district in 17th and 18th centuries during the Maratha rule by crossing Arabian and Turkic breeds with local ponies,However recent studies claim that Bhimthadi is a separate indigenous breed. These horses proved excellent for Maratha forces in fighting the Mughal army in the hilly terrains of Western Maharashtra. During their conquests in the 18th century, the Marathas were proud to claim that the Deccan horses had quenched their thirst with waters of the Indus The warrior and Maharajah Maratha Yashwantrao Holkar (1776-1811) is reputed to have always battle mounted a mare named Mahua, of Bhimthadi breed.

It seems that the Marathas raised a specific breed from the end of 18th century. According to local oral tradition from early 19th century, the breed was crossed with 500 Arabian horses and mares, obtained by the Nizam and nobles of Hyderabad directly Arabia. The breed is described as "Bhimthadi" in British sources. The breed also had some genetic contribution Persian and Turkish varieties. The best Bhimthadi horses were reputed to come from the valleys of the Bhima and Nira rivers in the present day Pune district.

However, the breed was allowed to degenerate during British rule in India.

The government of Gujarat took an initiative in 2010 to perform research on saving Bhimthadi and other near extinct breeds.

In his description of the economy of India at the end of the 19th century, Sir George Watt was very impressed with this breed, he considers it one of the best in India. He reports that the best ponies are named "Dhangar" or "Khilari". The people see them as a separate breed, but Watt believes that this distinction comes from a difference in breeding practices, the breeders from the Dhangar community used to castrate their animals. The latter raise groups of 20 to 30 ponies.

After their conquest of Maratha territories, the British encouraged inhabitants of the Bombay area to continue horse breeding in order to restore the old characteristics that are useful to them in the breed, by investing from around 1827 about £100,000 in a stud farm in Alegaon Paga. The experiment was abandoned fifteen years later in 1842. Famines and various British conquests that hit the region in the 19th century wiped out the livestock of Marathas. In 1850, the so-called Deccan race of the south completely disappeared. In 1898, the British could no longer find these ponies for their regiments and therefore replaced them with mules, because the race was decimated during the second campaign of Afghanistan. In 1907, the racehorse breeder, Sir Humphrey Francis De Trafford reported that the Deccani breed lives "bad days".

== Livestock distribution ==
Geographical origin of different Indian horse breeds

The breed originates from the valley of the Bhima River in the Pune District, hence its name, Bhimthadi. Deccani has become extremely rare: in 1988, according to the count sent to FAO, they numbered less than 100. It was later added to the list of indigenous breeds of horses by FAO, around 1999, with Chummarti and Sikang, two other endangered breeds. CAB International (2002) 26 and other sources (2004) consider race to be "virtually extinct". The conservation status of the Deccani was listed as 'critical' by the Food and Agriculture Organization of the United Nations in 2007.
