= Tibetan pony =

Breed of horse

Tibetan Pony
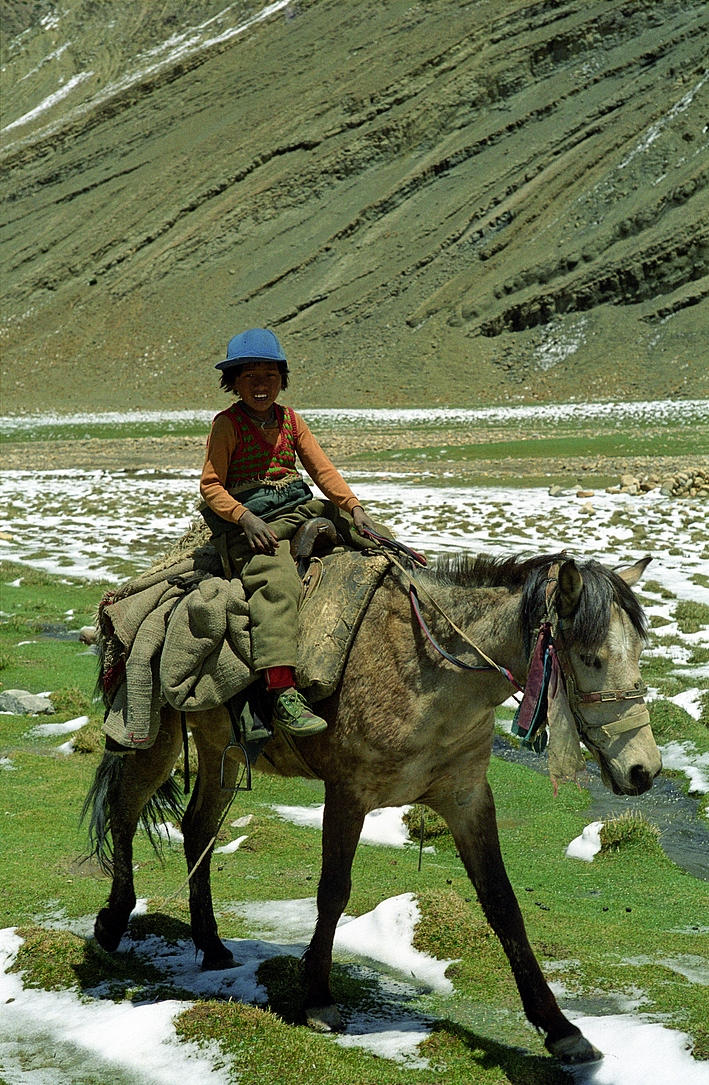
- Country of origin: Tibet and China

The Tibetan pony is a horse breed originating in Tibet. Once thought to be simple hardy mountain ponies developed from Mongolian stock, recent research indicates that there may be up to six separate horse breeds native to Tibet.

== History ==
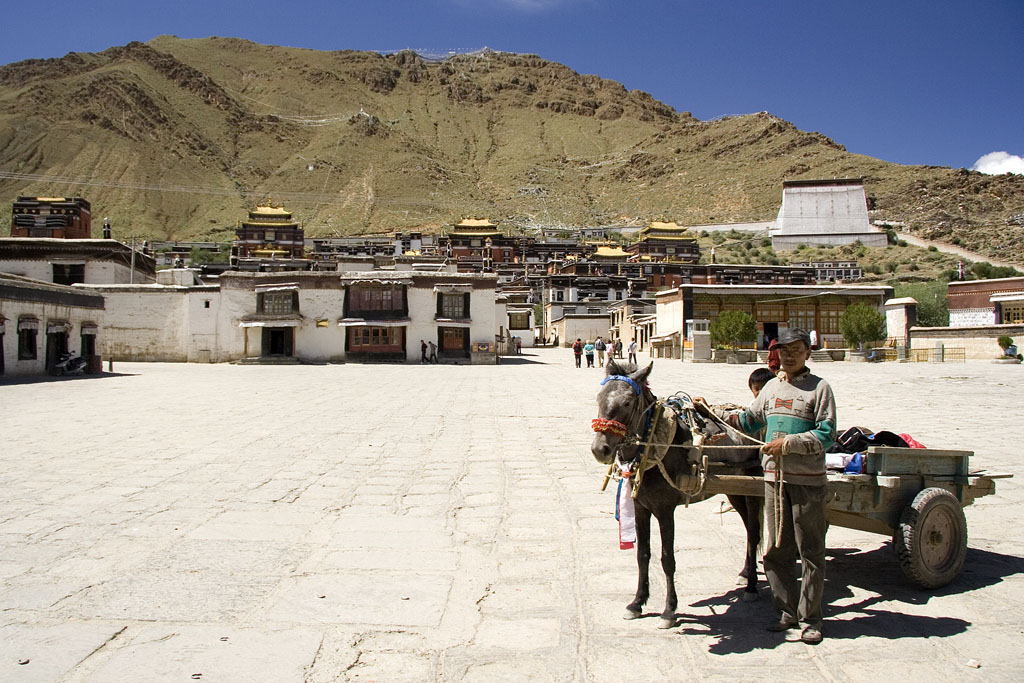
Working ponies

It is generally believed that most Tibetan ponies descended from ancient stock, likely partly from the Mongolian Pony and Chinese breeds. However, some breeds, such as the Nangchen horse have apparently been bred pure for centuries. Another type, the Riwoche horse, has been hypothesized to have been developed in isolation to a degree that some claim it is an evolutionary link between the prehistoric wild horse and the modern domestic horse, though it could also be a domesticated variety that reverted to primitive coloring.

Horses in general are well regarded by the local people, and they have been traditionally kept by both wealthy Tibetans and farmers alike, as well as by the Dalai Lama and other religious figures. The ponies were sent as gifts to Chinese Emperors, especially during the Ming and Tang dynasties. Horses also were commonly traded for tea from the southern parts of Sichuan province, China even as late as the 1950s. The trade was prolific to the extent that the route between Lhasa and Sichuan came to be known as the Tea-Horse Road.

== Characteristics ==
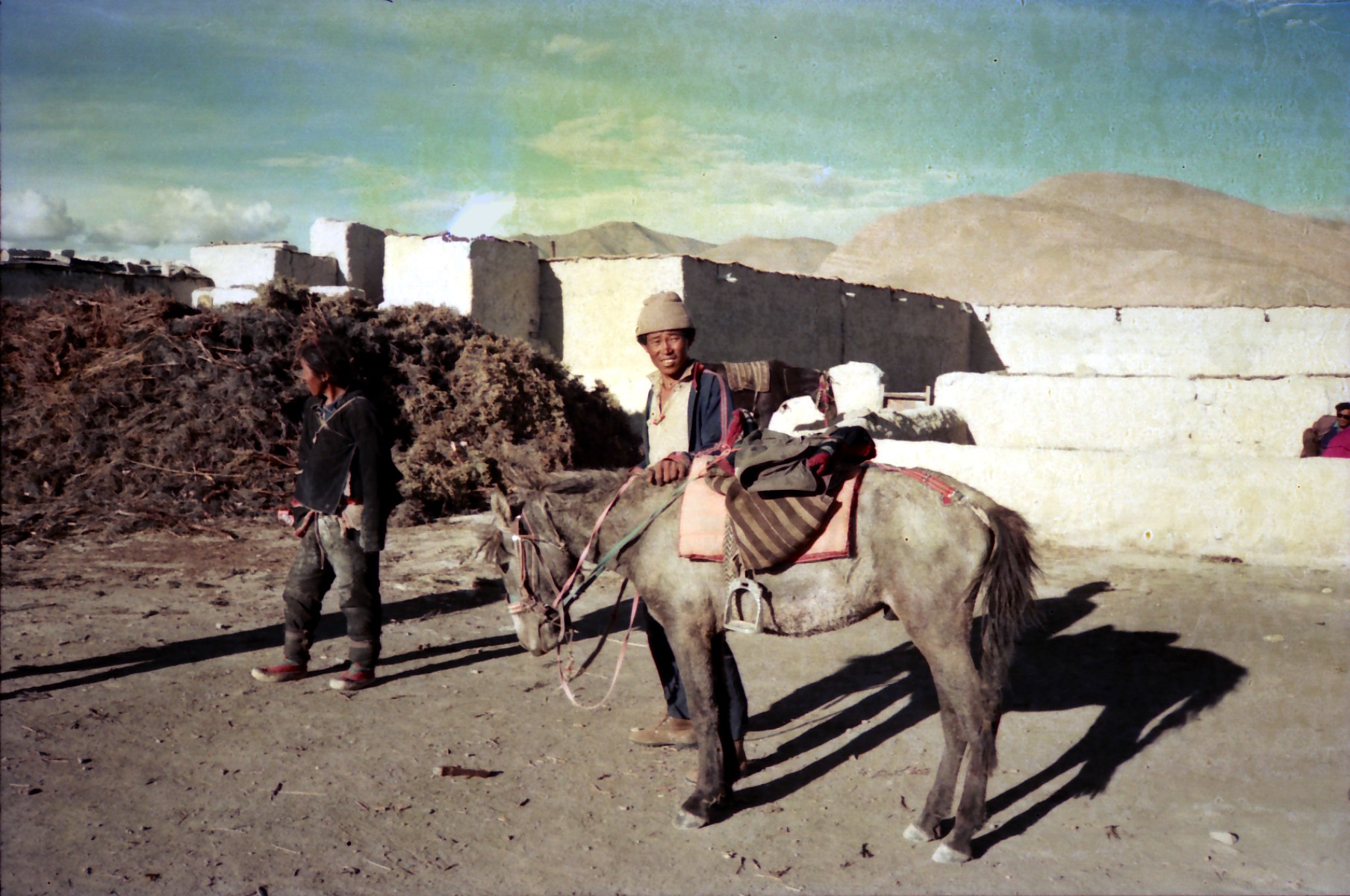
A Tibetan pony at work

The ponies are known for having considerable strength and endurance for their size, as well as sure-footedness and resilience. They are mostly kept as light draft animals, as well as for pack and riding work. The Nangchen horse is used as a race horse and for handling livestock.

Most Tibetan ponies have a pronounced jaw line, straight profile, and small ears and eyes. The neck is a muscular and a bit short, the chest is deep, the shoulder is straight. The ponies have powerful hindquarters, and short, strong legs with good joints.

== Cross breeding ==
The Tibetan Pony has been extensively crossbred with the Bhutia Pony and the Spiti Pony to create a new type called the Indian Country Bred. The Tibetan breeds in their pure form do retain individual characteristics and heritage, however.
