= List of megafauna discovered in modern times =

List of large animals discovered or rediscovered in modern times

The following is a list of megafauna discovered by science since the beginning of the 19th century (with their respective date of discovery). Some of these may have been known to native peoples or reported anecdotally but had not been generally acknowledged as confirmed by the scientific world, until conclusive evidence was obtained for formal studies. In other cases, certain animals were initially considered hoaxes – similar to the initial reception of mounted specimens of the duck-billed platypus (Ornithorhynchus anatinus) in late 18th-century Europe. Additionally, some cases can be of animals believed to have died out centuries ago, only to be rediscovered alive.

In zoology, megafauna (from Greek μέγας megas "large" and Neo-Latin fauna "animal life") are large animals. The most common thresholds to be a megafauna are weighing over 46 kilograms (100 lb) (i.e., having a mass comparable to or larger than a human) or weighing over a tonne, 1,000 kilograms (2,205 lb) (i.e., having a mass comparable to or larger than an ox).

This list includes some of the more notable examples discovered in modern times.

== Megafauna believed extinct, but rediscovered ==
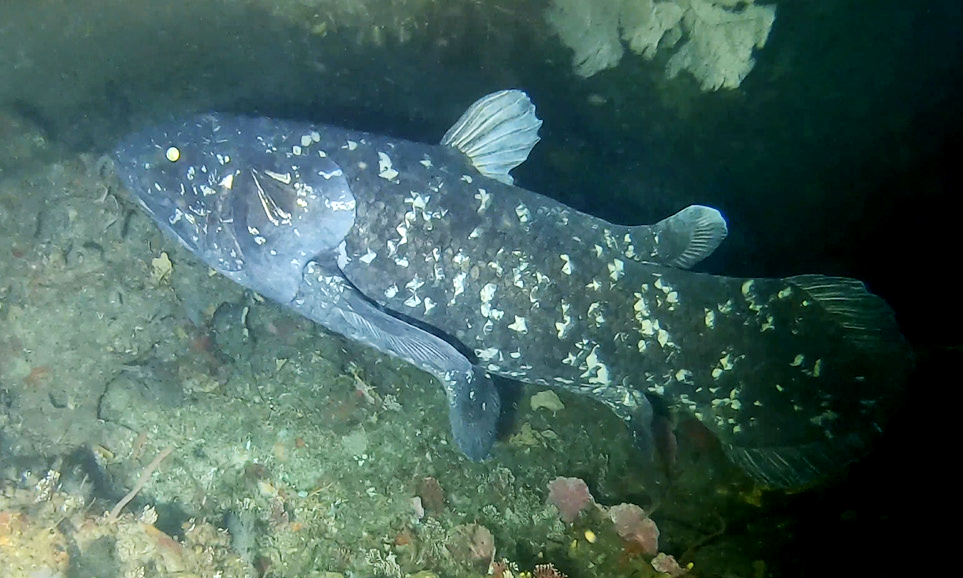
Coelacanth

- Coelacanths (Latimeria) – Believed to have gone extinct during the Cretaceous–Paleogene extinction event, rediscovered off the coast of east South Africa in 1938.
- False killer whale (Pseudorca crassidens) – Initially described as an extinct porpoise in 1843 from a skull dating to the Middle Pleistocene around 126,000 years ago, rediscovered at the Bay of Kiel in 1861.
- Fernandina Island tortoise (Chelonoidis niger phantasticus) – Subspecies of the Galápagos tortoise that was previously only known from a single male specimen collected in 1906, rediscovered in 2019.

== Megafauna previously unknown from the fossil record ==
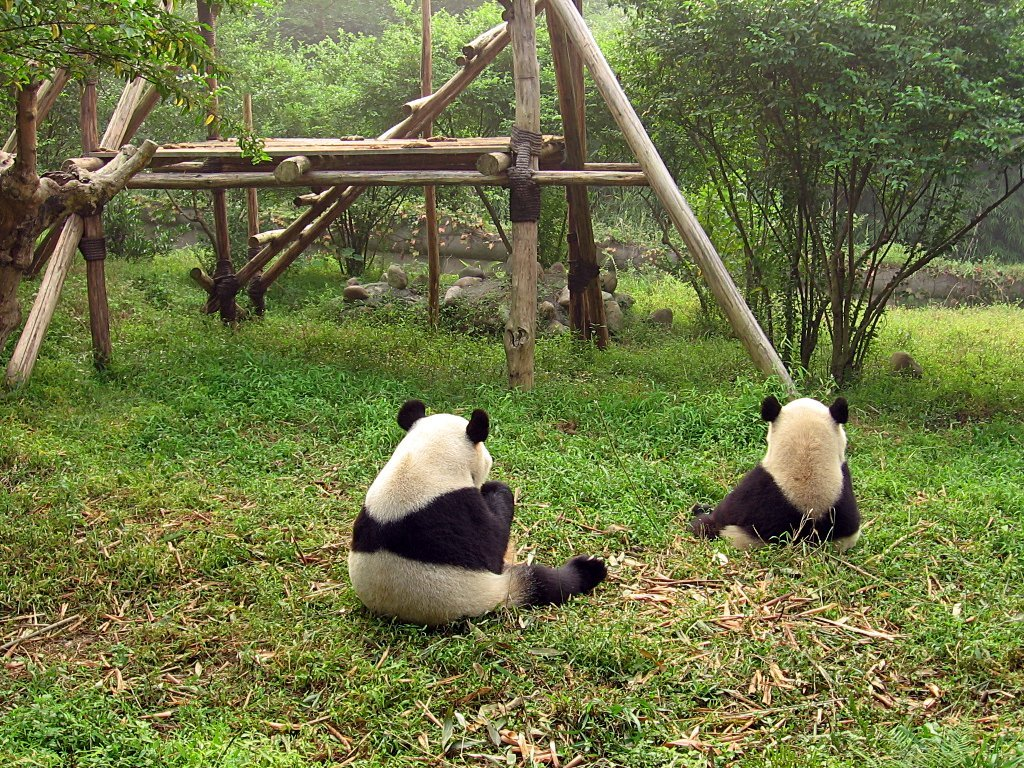
Giant pandas

- American alligator (A. mississippiensis) (1802)
- Western grey kangaroo (Notamacropus fuliginosus) (1817)
- Fossa (Cryptoprocta ferox) (1833)
- Malayan tapir (Tapirus indicus) (1819)
- Red kangaroo (Osphranter rufus) (1822)
- Lowland anoa (Bubalus depressicornis) (1827)
- Mountain tapir (Tapirus pinchaque) (1829)
- Baird's tapir (Tapirus bairdii) (1865)
- Giant panda (Ailuropoda melanoleuca) – European scientific literature did not reference the giant panda until 1869, although it was known to the Chinese since ancient times. Additionally, a subspecies was first described in 1959, but was not recognised as such until 2005.
- Bonobo (Pan paniscus) (1928)
- Kouprey (Bos sauveli) (1937)
- Megamouth shark (Megachasma pelagios) (1983)
- Saola (Pseudoryx nghetinhensis) (1993)

== Megafauna initially believed to have been fictitious or hoaxes ==
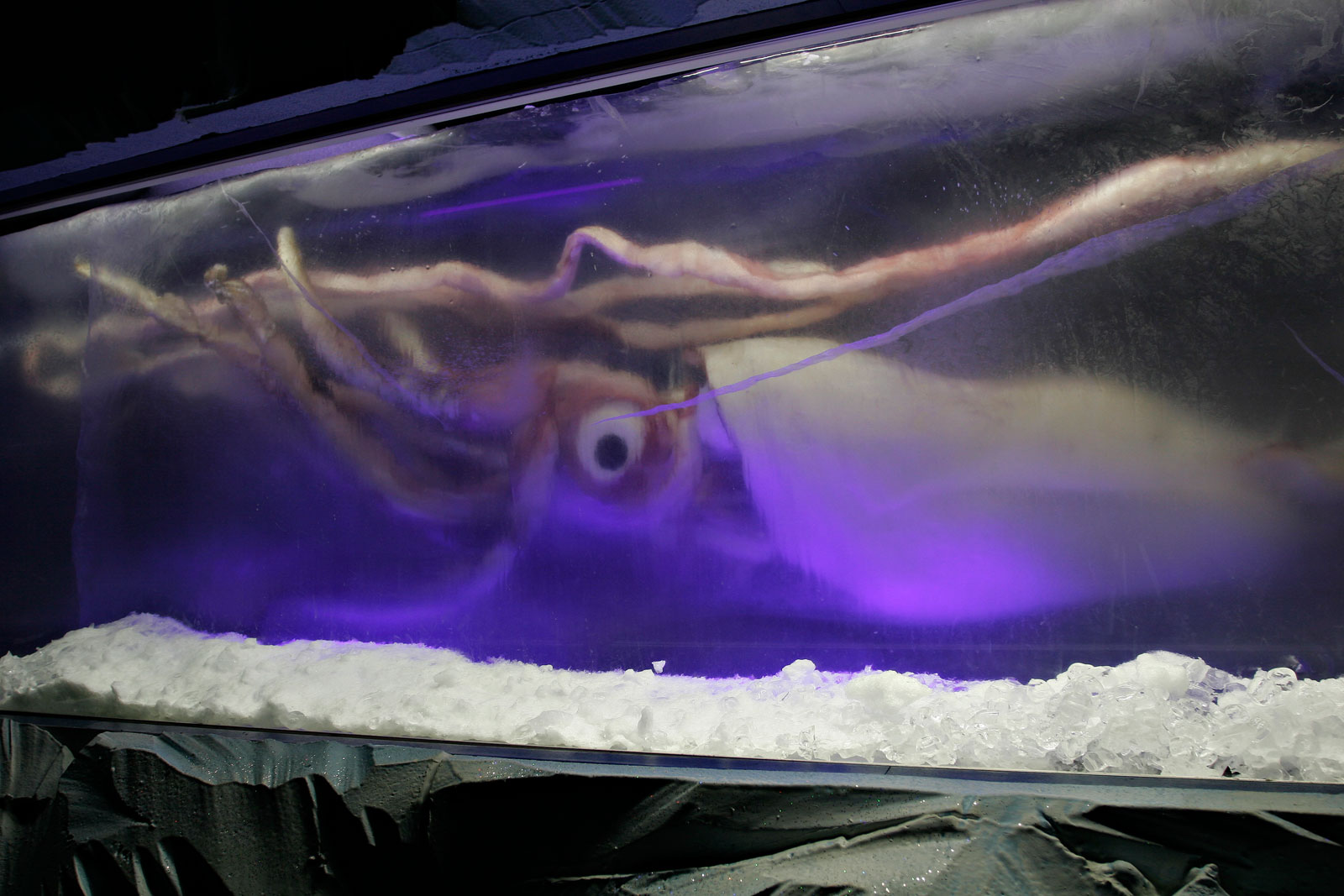
Giant squid specimen preserved in ice, anecdotal reports of this species date back to 400 BC by Aristotle.

- Gorillas (Gorilla) – Millenia worth of anecdotal reports and accounts of hairy men and women in western Africa, first described formally in 1847 from a dead Liberian specimen.
- Okapi (Okapia johnstoni) – Initially referred to as the "African unicorn" by Europeans due to its elusive nature prior to its formal discovery in 1901.
- Giant squid (Architeuthis dux) – Millenia worth of folklore, mythology, and anecdotal reports, first described formally in 1873 from a dead specimen in Newfoundland and recorded alive in 2006.
- Komodo dragon (Varanus komodoensis) – Anecdotal reports of "land crocodiles" by Europeans in 1910, live specimens transported to the London Zoo in 1927.

== See also ==
- Animals in ancient Greece and Rome
- List of mammals described in the 2000s
- List of giant squid specimens and sightings
