= Khoriphaba =

- Prince of the Sky Kingdom
- Member of Lainingthous and divine polo players
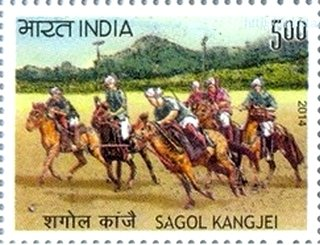
- God Khoriphaba is one of the 14 players of polo (Sagol Kangjei) in Meitei mythology
- Other names: Khoiriphaba
- Affiliation: Sanamahism
- Major cult center: Nambol
- Abode: Nambol
- Weapon: Kangjei (polo-stick)
- Animals: Mare (female horse)
- Mount: Manipuri pony
- Texts: Khoriphaba Naothemlon, Kangjeirol
- Gender: Male
- Region: Antique Manipur
- Ethnic group: Meitei
- Festivals: Lai Haraoba

Genealogy
- Parents: Salailen (father); Konthoujam Tampha Lairembi (mother)
- Siblings: Ereima (Irai Leima), Hellois, Khamlangba, Pakhangba, Phouoibi, Ngaleima, Nongshaba (Kanglasha), Nongthang Leima, Sanamahi, Thumleima
- Consort: Changning Leima

Khoriphaba (Meitei: ꯈꯣꯔꯤꯐꯥꯕ) is a God in Sanamahism, the indigenous religion of Manipur. He is the son of Sky God Salailen and the Goddess Konthoujam Tampha Lairembi. He came down from heaven to earth to search for his mother and then for a bride. He is best known for wrestling with Loyalakpa in the Lai Haraoba festival. He is also a Sagol Kangjei(polo)-playing God.

== Description ==
God Khoriphaba is a Lainingthou (Meitei: ꯂꯥꯏꯅꯤꯡꯊꯧ, lit. 'kingly god').

Khoriphaba is a sportsman. He participated in polo and wrestling championships. Among the deities, Khoriphaba and Loyalakpa are known as the best wrestlers. The two powerful gods wrestled during the Lai Haraoba festival.

God Khoriphaba participated in the divine polo championship, playing for the team led by Thangjing, while their opponents were led by Marjing.

== Mythology ==
God Khoriphaba was born from the divine union of Salailen and Konthoujam Tampha Lairembi. When Khoriphaba was very young, his parents separated. His mother was abandoned and forbidden to enter Heaven. Little Khoriphaba was looked after by the 1000 queens of heaven, but he cried for his mother. Salailen tried to pacify the baby with milk, but in vain. He summoned his nobles and subjects. He asked them to make his son stop crying. Thousands of gods and goddesses tried but all of them failed. Finally, Chingkheirel Apamba tried his luck. He sang hymns in praise of the baby God. Suddenly, the boy stopped crying. At this, Salailen named his son Khoiriphaba.

One day, Angoupalba Yaibirel Sidaba found Khoiriphaba crying near a tree. He brought the boy to his home. He asked his family to take care of the boy. The clan members looked after the child like their own child. They named him Puthiba.

One day, Khoiriphaba heard some women talking about ow much his mother must have suffered for the loss of her child. Khoiriphaba immediately asked them about his mother, but none of them knew where to find her. So, he decided to search for his mother by himself.

God Khoriphaba descended from sky down to earth in search for his lost mother. He came to Moirang, near Khoiri Keithel. The sun had already set when he arrived. Not knowing what to do, he started crying. Thangjing and his consort Koiren Leima came to him. They came to know about the identity of the boy and took care of him.

Khoiriphaba grew up under the guardianship of the God Thangjing. He made many friends. When he was nine years old, he started wrestling, racing, and so on. He was always the champion of all the competitions making his friends jealous of him. So, one of his friends told him about how he grew up under the care of Thangjing. Khoriphaba was told that they would not allow him to play with them because he was an inferior God. Khoriphaba felt dejected for many days. Thangjing noticed it and asked him. Khoiriphaba narrated him the incident. So, Thangjing decided that Khoiriphaba should be sent to his mother without further delaying. He summoned all the 27 friends of Khoiriphaba. He asked them to challenge Khoiriphaba for wrestling and race championships. None were ready for the challenge. Then Thangjing asked them about a tug of war in which all of them would stand together at one side and Khoiriphaba alone at another side. There was a condition. If they won, they would be the winner. But if Khoiriphaba won, they should send Khoiriphaba off to his mother's place at Haorok Konthou, carrying him on a palanquin. The 27 friends accepted the challenge. But all of them got defeated in the hands of Khoiriphaba.

On the next day, the 27 friends proceeded for the journey with Khoiriphaba on a palanquin towards Haorok Konthou. They came from a long distance from Moirang. On the way, they came across a beautiful place. They could not control themselves to rest at the beautiful place for a while. They requested Khoiriphaba who agreed. The beautiful place where they rested was named Toubul (Old Manipuri: Toupul). Some friends were waiting for the resting friends at another place. The place where they waited was named Ngaikhong Khullen. After some time, little by little, all of his friends left Khoiriphaba alone. So, Khoiriphaba continued his journey alone. On the way, he came across a river. On the river, many women were fishing using nets. Since morning, they could not catch a single fish. He was helped by a woman to cross the river.

Finally, he reached Haorok Konthou. The people of the place were greatly awed to see him. They have heard of his quest. But Goddess Tampha was not at the place. Due to the fear of Salailen, the villagers sent her off to another place. She was looked after by the Kabui tribes in the hills. So, Khoriphaba set off for the next journey riding on his mare Ngangrubi.

On reaching the village of the Kabui tribes in the hills, he was warmly welcomed by the tribesmen. He finally met his long departed mother. He proposed her to return home back to heaven. But she did not agree because she was abandoned by her husband. So, he sadly left his mother.

There are also legends about God Khoriphaba looking for a bride. He veiled his face and hold a polo-stick over his shoulder. While searching for a lover, he was riding on a mare.

God Khoriphaba reached Koubru's place. God Koubru offered him to choose any lady of his choice from his place. Khoriphaba chose Goddess Nungthel Leima. But Nungthel Leima was already the consort of Loyalakpa. So, God Koubru could not give him the desired lady. Koubru did not want to take back his own words. He asked Khoriphaba to choose any lady but he should do it blindfolded. Blindfolded Khoiriphaba attempted to choose but he could not get Goddess Nungthel Leima. This action is enacted by the maibis in the Lai Haraoba festival.

== Worship ==
During the Lai Haraoba festival, there is a special ritual named Kanglei Thokpa dedicated to God Khoriphaba. In this ritual, a group of maibis sing a song depicting Khoriphaba's search for a bride.

"The goddess of the hills, my beloved
The jewel, which I am unable to part with
On such a day, I follow your footprints
I fail to find you...
Sweet one, have you gone to another village?
Or have you gone to fetch fire from your neighbour?
Or have you gone to wash your hair at the riverbank?
Or are you combing your beautiful hair in the huge house of your father?
Perhaps, you have gone to a kang game and seated between two village brothers as a piece of decoration, radiating...
Perhaps, a cloth is tied around your shoulder and slender waist and you are pounding rice.
My friend, I have not seen my beloved for a long time.
Please tell me where she is?"

This song of love and associated gesture evolve into dancing. The dance enacts the horse polo game. During this ritual ceremony, a maibi will cover her face with a veil. She will hold a kangjei (English: polo-stick or hockey-stick). She will hook a girl from amidst the crowd with the hooked end of the stick. This is called Lai Nupi Thiba (lit. Predilection of bride).

During his worship, cooked foods could be offered but devotees are not allowed to offer fish.

== Texts ==
The Khoriphaba Naothemlon text describes song to stop little Khoriphaba from crying.

== Namesakes ==
- The Khoriphaba Artistes Association is a non commercial artists' association. It was established in 1971 in Imphal.
- The Mr. Khoriphaba Body Building Championship is an annual event that took place in 2019.

== See also ==
- Nongda Lairen Pakhangba
- Pureiromba

== Bibliography ==
- Kege Hareppa Ngangoi Leishemba by Shitalchandra Singh, Thingbaijam
- Khoriphābā: mamā nūṃśibā khonā phabā nūpāmacā amā - Raghu Laiśaṃthem - Rindā Pablikeśans, 2013
- Philosophy On Lai Haraoba by Tamphajao, Yumnam
