= List of deities in Sanamahism =

Names of gods in Meitei mythology

Sanamahism is the indigenous religion of the Meitei people. It originated in the Kingdom of Kangleipak, and is still practiced in modern Manipur, India, distinct from both the Indosphere and the Sinosphere. Sanamahism is a polytheistic religion with thousands of gods and goddesses of varying power, quality, features, and character.

== Principle deities ==
There are five main deities in Sanamahism:

- Atingkok Maru Sidaba (no: ꯑꯇꯤꯡꯀꯣꯛ ꯃꯔꯨ ꯁꯤꯗꯕ), creator of the universe.
- Lainingthou Sanamahi (no: ꯂꯥꯢꯅꯤꯡꯊꯧ ꯁꯅꯥꯃꯍꯤ), protector and guardian of mankind.
- Pakhangba (no: ꯄꯥꯈꯪꯕ), dragon god, ruler of the universe and destroyer of evil. A son of Salailen and Leimarel Sidabi.
- Leimarel Sidabi (no: ꯂꯩꯃꯔꯦꯜ ꯁꯤꯗꯕꯤ), principle goddess of earth, nature and household. Mother of all living beings. Consort of Salailen and the mother of Pakhangba.
- Imoinu (no: ꯏꯃꯣꯢꯅꯨ), an incarnation of Leimarel, Goddess of household, hearth, family, kitchen, wealth, peace and prosperity.

== Guardians of the Directions ==
In Sanamahism, there are ten directions, for which there are ten deities who are the protectors and the guardians.

| Deities | Direction | Other attributes |
|---|---|---|
| Marjing (no: ꯃꯥꯔꯖꯤꯡ) | North east | God of polo, hockey, horses, sports and war. He rides on Samadon Ayangba, a flying horse, created by Sanamahi. |
| Thangjing (no: ꯊꯥꯡꯖꯤꯡ) | South west | Ruling deity of the Moirang dynasty. |
| Koupalu (no: ꯀꯧꯄꯂꯨ) | North west | Founder of human civilization. He rides on a white elephant named Samu Laishaa Angoupa who guards the outskirts of Mount Koubru. |
| Wangpulen (no: ꯋꯥꯡꯄꯨꯂꯦꯟ) | South east | God of the underwater world. |
| Kounu (no: ꯀꯧꯅꯨ) | North | Goddess of snows, hills and mountains. Consort of Koupalu and the mother of Loyalakpa and Nungthel Leima. |
| Nongpok Ningthou (no: ꯅꯣꯡꯄꯣꯛ ꯅꯤꯡꯊꯧ) | East | Consort of Panthoibi. |
| Lok Ningthou (no: ꯂꯣꯛ ꯅꯤꯡꯊꯧ) | South | God of streams, rivers, and gorges. |
| Loyalakpa (no: ꯂꯣꯌꯥꯂꯥꯛꯄ) | West | Guardian God of the Western direction. Son of Koupalu and Kounu. |
| Salailen Sidaba | Zenith | |
| Thongalen (no: ꯊꯣꯡꯉꯥꯂꯦꯟ) | Nadir | King of the Underworld and the God of Death. |

== Incarnations of Leimarel Sidibi ==
Leimarel Sidabi, the supreme goddess has incarnated several times in various forms with diverse attributes.

- Hikubi Yaikubi (Meitei: ꯍꯤꯀꯨꯕꯤ ꯌꯥꯢꯀꯨꯕꯤ), Goddess of gems.
- Irai Leima (Meitei: ꯏꯔꯥꯢ ꯂꯩꯃ), Goddess of water and daughter of Salailen, the sky God, who sent her down to earth to bring prosperity to human civilization.
- Leimarel Sidabi
- Panthoibi (Meitei: ꯄꯥꯟꯊꯣꯏꯕꯤ) Goddess of civilization, courage, fertility, handicraft, love, victory, warfare and wisdom. A consort of God Nongpok Ningthou.
- Ngaleima (Meitei: ꯉꯥꯂꯩꯃ), Goddess of fish and dweller in the underwater world. A daughter of Salailen, who sent her to earth to bring prosperity to humanity.
- Nongthang Leima (Meitei: ꯅꯣꯡꯊꯥꯡ ꯂꯩꯃ), Goddess of enchantment, seduction, thunder, and lightning. Created from the dazzling eyes of Salailen to seduce Pakhangba.
- Phouoibi (Meitei: ꯄꯥꯟꯊꯣꯏꯕꯤ), Goddess of agriculture, crops, fertility, grains, rice, harvests, and wealth. A daughter of Salailen sent to earth to bring prosperity.
- Pithai Khongdaibi (Meitei: ꯄꯤꯊꯥꯢ ꯈꯣꯡꯗꯥꯢꯕꯤ), Goddess of motherhood.
- Silreima (Meitei: ꯁꯤꯜꯔꯩꯃ), Goddess of work and occupation.
- Thumleima (Meitei: ꯊꯨꯝꯂꯩꯃ), Goddess of salt; a daughter of Salailen.
- Yumjao Leima (Meitei: ꯌꯨꯝꯖꯥꯎ ꯂꯩꯃ), mother goddess of house, household, royalty, and power.

== Apokpa (ancestral deities) ==
The ancestral deities of every families and clans were called Apokpa. They are worshipped by their respective families (Yumnak) and clans (Yek Salai).

- Khuman Pokpa (Meitei: ꯈꯨꯃꯟ ꯄꯣꯛꯄ)
- Pureiromba (Meitei: ꯄꯨꯔꯩꯔꯣꯝꯕ)

== Celestial gods ==
According to the Khenchonglol the Sun, Moon, seven planets, and twenty seven stars are referred to as deities.

- Nongmaiching (Sun)
- Ningthoukaba (Moon)
- Leipakpokpa (Mars)
- Yumsakeisa (Mercury)
- Sagolsen (Jupiter)
- Irai (Venus)
- Thangja (Saturn)
- Shakok (Uranus)
- Shamei (Neptune)
- Sajik (Arietis)
- Thaba (Musca)
- Khongjom Nubi (Pleiades)
- Apaknga (Lunar mansions)
- Sachung Telheiba (A Orionis)
- Likla Saphaba (Orion)
- Chingcharoibi (G Geminorum)
- Chungshennubi (Cancer)

In Meitei mythology, there are seven celestial goddesses, the Lai Nuraa Tare, the creation of the Lord Atingkok Maru Sidaba and seven nymphs or helloi taret, who are the daughters of the Salailen Sidaba.

== Gods of the Underworld ==
- Laikhurembi (Meitei: ꯂꯥꯢꯈꯨꯔꯦꯝꯕꯤ), Goddess of argument, justice, good counsel, divine law, order, retribution and secrecy. Queen of the Underworld kingdom and a consort of God Thongalen.
- Lainaotabi (Meitei: ꯂꯥꯢꯅꯥꯎꯇꯥꯕ), Goddess of weaving, magic, and witchcraft, a consort of God Thongalen and later a concubine of Poireiton.
- Thongak Lairembi (no: ꯊꯣꯡꯉꯥꯛ ꯂꯩꯃ), gatekeeper of the Underworld Kingdom and consort of Thongalen.
- Thongalen (Meitei: ꯊꯣꯡꯉꯥꯂꯦꯟ), King of the Underworld and the God of Death.

== Umang Lai ==
There are more than 365 forest deities or Umang Lai in Sanamahism. They are always associated with a sacred grove. The term Umang Lai is also used to refer to the sacred abodes of the deities.

- Nongshaba (no: ꯅꯣꯡꯁꯥꯕ), Lion God who protects humanity from evils. A son of Salailen.
- Konthoujam Tampha Lairembi (no: ꯀꯣꯟꯊꯧꯖꯝ ꯇꯝꯐꯥ), Queen of Heaven.
- Mongba Hanba (no: ꯃꯣꯡꯕ ꯍꯟꯕ), a forest God associated with healing.
- Haoreima (no: ꯍꯥꯎꯂꯩꯃ), Goddess of tragic love and separation, disease, souls and spirits.
- Ichum Lairembi (no: ꯏꯆꯨꯝ ꯂꯥꯏꯔꯦꯝꯕꯤ), presiding goddess of the Khurkhul region.
- Koujeng Leima (no: ꯀꯧꯖꯦꯡ ꯂꯩꯃ), a consort of God Koupalu and one of the nine goddesses who participated in the festival of Thangjing.
- Nungthel Leima (no: ꯅꯨꯡꯊꯦꯜ ꯂꯩꯃ), Goddess of the first villager, daughter of Koupalu and Kounu.
- Taoroinai (no: ꯇꯥꯑꯣꯔꯣꯏꯅꯥꯏ), serpentine dragon god from the Moon.
- thareima (ꯊꯥꯔꯩꯃꯥ) the goddess of moon, calmness stillness, periods, peace

=== Craft deities ===
- Lainaotabi (Meitei: ꯂꯥꯢꯅꯥꯎꯇꯥꯕ), Goddess of weaving, magic, and witchcraft, a consort of God Thongalen and later a concubine of Poireiton.
- Pisatao (no: ꯄꯤꯁꯥꯇꯥꯎ), God of architecture, artisans, forges, handicrafts, and metallurgy.
- Khamlangba (no: ꯈꯝꯂꯥꯡꯕ), God of iron, mining, metallurgy, hunting, and war.

=== Bird and animal goddesses ===
- Nganu Leima (no: ꯉꯥꯅꯨ ꯂꯩꯃ), Goddess of waterfowl.
- Khunu Leima (no: ꯈꯨꯅꯨ ꯂꯩꯃ), Goddess of pigeons and doves.
- Shapi Leima (no: ꯁꯄꯤ ꯂꯩꯃ), Goddess of rodents.

=== Agricultural deities ===
- Panam Ningthou (no: ꯄꯅꯝ ꯅꯤꯡꯊꯧ), igniter of the first fire and the divine protector of crops (especially rice) from hailstorms and thunder.
- Phou Ningthou (no: ꯐꯧ ꯅꯤꯡꯊꯧ), god of agriculture, crops, fertility, grains, rice, and harvests.
- Pureiromba (no: ꯄꯨꯔꯩꯔꯣꯝꯕ), giver of rain and agricultural prosperity, ancestral deity of the Angom clan.
- Phouoibi (no: ꯄꯥꯟꯊꯣꯏꯕꯤ), Goddess of agriculture, crops, fertility, grains, rice, harvests, and wealth.

=== Lake and river goddesses ===
There are various Lake and river guardian goddesses.

- Loktak Ima of Loktak Lake
- Pumlenpat Lairembi of Pumlenpat Lake
- Thongjarok Lairembi of Thongjaorok River
- Iril Lairembi of Iril River
- Imphal Turel Lairembi of Imphal River
- Kongba Turel Lairembi of Kongba River

=== Market goddesses ===
People worshipped one goddess for each market area considering the spirit of the goddess as the protector, guardian of the region.

- Pishum Keithel Lairembi of Pishumthong Market Region
- Singjamei Keithel Lairembi of Singjamei Market Region.
- Kongba Keithel Lairembi of Kongba Market Region

== Worship ==
According to the Loiyumpa Silyel Constitution,

1. Meireima is worshipped by the Heirom family.
2. Khanglangba is worshipped by the Irom family.
3. Shorarel (heaven) is worshipped by the Sorelsangbam family.
4. Lammabee is worshipped by the Sharang Leishangthem family.
5. Phouoibi (goddess for paddy) is worshipped by the Sharotkhaibam family.
6. Shanglang-mei (Kangla) is worshipped by the Potshangbam family.
7. Kutchu (Wayenshang) is worshipped by the Moirang Pukhrambam family.
8. Mawao Leima is worshipped by the Shoubam family.
9. Panthoibi (most adored Meetei goddess) is worshipped by the Heishnam family.
10. Pet-angnga is worshipped by the Khoisanam family.
11. Laikhurembee is worshipped by the Taibangjam family.
12. Huimureima is worshipped by the Konthoujam family.
13. Lainaotabi is worshipped by the Ashangbam family.
14. Nungthelleima is worshipped by the Chingkhwam family.
15. Shoubonleima is worshipped by the Arambam family.
16. Awangba (deity Lai-wangba) is worshipped by the Yenkhom Phisabam family.
17. Luwaang Ching is worshipped by the Luwangshangbam family.
18. Lainingthou is worshipped by the Sinam Laishangbam family.
19. Puthiba is worshipped by the Moirangthem Puthem family.
20. Pureiromba is worshipped by the Mangsatabam family.
21. Tenlongba is worshipped by the Langmaithem family.
22. Thongak is worshipped by the Ngarangyanpam family.
23. Chingkol-Ningthou is worshipped by the Nakalbam family.
24. Chingbal Leima is worshipped by the Khuraijam family.
25. Yaoreibi is worshipped by the Meiyengbam family.
26. Koubarel is worshipped by the Leishangthem family.
27. Numitleima is worshipped by the Ningthoujam family.
28. Koubru is worshipped by the Pukkalabam family.
29. Marjing is worshipped by the Chenglei-Laishangbam family.
30. Moirang Phaktom Ariba is worshipped by the Moirangthem family.
31. Hongnemyoi Khunjao is worshipped by the Kangpucham family.
32. Chinga is worshipped by the Chingkhalbam family.
33. Langjing is worshipped by the Longjam Pheiroijam family.
34. Langgol is worshipped by the Tekcham family.
35. Langmaicheeng (Nongmaijing) is worshipped by the Nongmaithem family.
36. Chinga Leima is worshipped by the Ningthoujam family.
37. Langching Hiyangthou Leima is worshipped by the Heithou and Khongtekcham families.
38. Yumjao Lairemma is worshipped by the Thaopicham family.

== See also ==
- PuYa
- Sanamahi creation myth
- Religion in Manipur

== Bibliography ==
- The Meitheis, by T.C. Hodson, Akansha Publication, Kolkata, 1908
