= Committee on Protection and Preservation of the Historic Rights of Koubru and Thangjing Hill Ranges =

Civil organization in Manipur, India

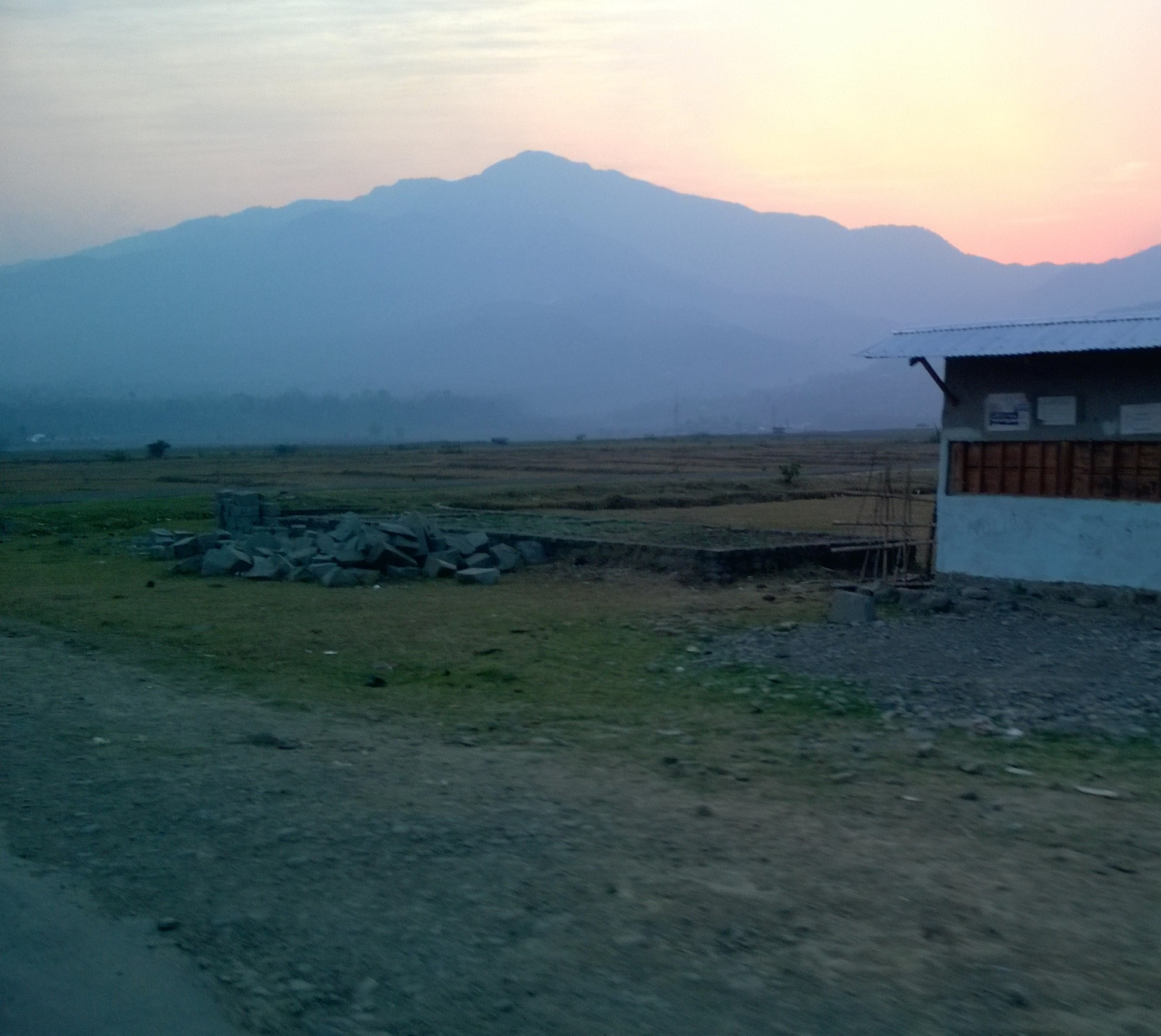
A scene of Mount Koubru from the Imphal Valley

The Committee on Protection and Preservation of the Historical Rights of Koubru and Thangjing Hill Ranges (CPPKT) (Note: Known in Meitei language in Meitei script as (ꯀꯝꯃꯤꯇꯤ ꯑꯣꯟ ꯄ꯭ꯔꯣꯇꯦꯛꯁꯟ ꯑꯦꯟ꯭ꯗ ꯄ꯭ꯔꯤꯁꯔꯚꯦꯁꯟ ꯑꯣꯐ ꯗꯥ ꯍꯤꯁ꯭ꯇꯣꯔꯤꯀꯦꯜ ꯔꯥꯏꯠ꯭ꯁ ꯑꯣꯐ ꯀꯧꯕ꯭ꯔꯨ ꯑꯦꯟ꯭ꯗ ꯊꯥꯡꯖꯤꯡ ꯍꯤꯜ ꯔꯦꯟꯖ꯭ꯁ)) is a civil organisation in Manipur concerned with the protection of religious, cultural, and historical sites located in the Mount Koubru and Thangjing hill ranges. The committee has engaged with government authorities through memoranda, meetings, and public demonstrations regarding access to these sites and the presence of structures it considers unauthorised.

== Religious and historical context ==
The Koubru and Thangjing hill ranges are regarded by the Meitei community as sacred. Koubru is associated with Ibudhou Koubru, while Thangjing is associated with Ibudhou Thangjing, the ancestral deity of Moirang. According to CPPKT, the hills contain multiple sites of worship and locations of historical importance. The committee has stated that access to these sites has been restricted since May 3, 2023, affecting religious observances and pilgrimages.

== Representations to the Government ==
=== Memorandum to the Chief Minister in 2021 ===
On January 14, 2021, CPPKT submitted a memorandum to Chief Minister N Biren Singh seeking protection of the entire Koubru and Thangjing hill ranges. The committee noted that although certain portions of the hills had earlier been protected under the Manipur Ancient and Archeological Sites and Remains Act, 1976, many sites of religious and historical significance were not included. CPPKT stated that Koubru contains thirteen sites of worship, while Thangjing includes thirteen sites of worship and nine historical sites, and requested that the full hill ranges be brought under the Place of Worship (Special Provisions) Act, 1991.

=== Agreement with the Kuki Student’s Organization in 2022 ===
On May 23, 2022, CPPKT and the Kuki Student’s Organization of Henglep Block and Churachandpur reached an agreement concerning Thangjing Hills. Both parties agreed to withdraw previous press statements related to the issue and appealed for restraint in public commentary. The agreement was signed at the office of the Director General of Police, Manipur, and was acknowledged publicly by Chief Minister N Biren Singh.

== Engagement with the Governor ==
On April 2, 2025, representatives of Thangjing Seva Mandal, the Historical Heritage Development Organisation, and CPPKT met Governor Ajay Kumar Bhalla at Raj Bhavan. They raised concerns regarding difficulties faced by devotees in visiting Thangjing Hills. The Governor assured that the matter would be examined. Officials from the Governor’s office and the Bishnupur district police were present at the meeting.

CPPKT later stated that the Government had assured removal of an unauthorised structure at Thangjing Hill, a survey of the area, enhanced security measures, and arrangements for pilgrimages to Koubru and Thangjing during Sajibu 2026. A reminder memorandum seeking updates on these assurances was submitted to the Governor on December 16, 2025, but CPPKT reported that no response had been received.

== Public demonstrations ==
On December 26, 2025, CPPKT announced a mass rally to be held on December 28 to seek access for Meitei pilgrims to Koubru and Thangjing. The decision followed a joint meeting of CPPKT and various civil society organisations at Moirang Kumam Mandap on December 25. The meeting discussed continued restrictions on pilgrimages, developments at Thangjing Hills, and the perceived lack of government action.

The rally took place on December 28, 2025, in Moirang, beginning at Ibudhou Thangjing Moirang Laikol and concluding at the Hemam Nilamani Ngangkhalampak Sports Complex. The event was organised by CPPKT along with several community organisations and included public statements calling for government action to allow access to the sacred sites.

== 2025 Memorandum ==
On December 29, 2025, CPPKT sought an audience with Governor Ajay Kumar Bhalla at Raj Bhavan but was not granted an appointment. The committee submitted a memorandum through the Governor’s office. According to CPPKT secretary Shyam Khumanthem, the memorandum addressed restricted access to sacred sites since May 3, 2023, and requested removal of unauthorised structures, permission for religious observances, and protection of sites including Koubru and Thangjing.

CPPKT stated that copies of the memorandum would also be submitted to the Chief Secretary, the Member of the Legislative Assembly of Moirang Assembly Constituency, and the concerned Deputy Commissioners. The committee indicated that further public action could follow if no response was received.

== See also ==
- Meitei civilisation
- Traditional Meitei religion
- Meitei mythology
- Meitei folklore
- Meitei deities
- Nongmaiching Ching
- Heingang Ching
- Heibok Ching
