= Meitei guardians of the directions =

Meitei direction deities

In Meitei religion and Meitei mythology, the Guardians of the Directions or Maikei Ngaakpa Lai refers to the deities who rule the specific directions of space according to Sanamahism.

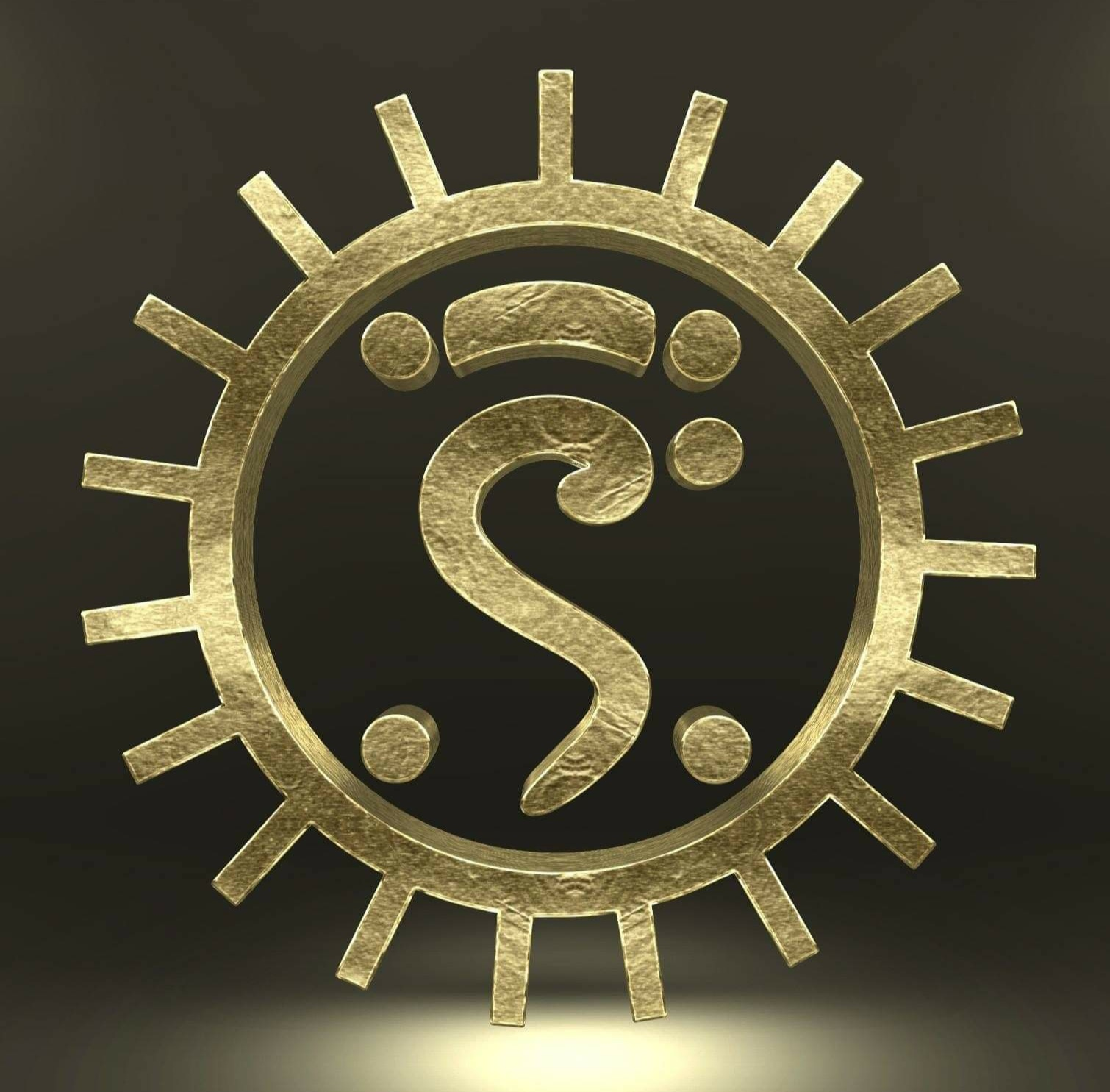
Symbol of Sanamahism

There are mainly ten Guardians of the Directions in Meitei mythology. These are the following:

| Name | Meitei Transliteration | Direction | Description | Consort | Associated creature |
|---|---|---|---|---|---|
| Kounu | ꯀꯧꯅꯨ | North | She's the goddess who dwells in the snows of far north. Kounuthel (ꯀꯧꯅꯨꯊꯦꯜ), a stream, flowing in the Kounu Hill (ꯀꯧꯅꯨ ꯆꯤꯡ) is considered to be her native place. She's the mother of Lord Loyalakpa. | Lainingthou Koubru | |
| Lok Ningthou | ꯂꯣꯛ ꯅꯤꯡꯊꯧ | South | He's the divine king of a hillock kingdom in the southern realms. | | |
| Nongpok Ningthou | ꯅꯣꯡꯄꯣꯛ ꯅꯤꯡꯊꯧ | East | He's the ruler of the Selloi Langmai Nongpok Hill (ꯁꯦꯂꯣꯢ ꯂꯥꯡꯃꯥꯢ ꯅꯣꯡꯄꯣꯛ ꯆꯤꯡ), and is associated with attributes of being a hunter, a lover, an adventurer and a physician. | Panthoibi | He himself assumes the form of a ferocious tiger, whom goddess Panthoibi rides on. |
| Loya Lakpa | ꯂꯣꯌꯥ ꯂꯥꯛꯄ | West | He's the son of Lord Koubru and Lady Kounu. | He's the consort of Lady Thoudu Nungthel Leima (ꯊꯧꯗꯨ ꯅꯨꯡꯊꯦꯜ ꯂꯩꯃ), the adopted daughter of his own parents. | |
| Thangjing | ꯊꯥꯡꯖꯤꯡ | South west | He's the progenitor of the Moilang dynasty in Moirang kingdom. He dwells both in the Ibudhou Thangjing Temple as well as on the Thangjing Hill. | Ayangleima Ahal (Koirenleima Ahal) and Ayangleima Atompi (Koirenleima Atompi) | He rides on a Manipuri pony, which is a gift from Lord Marjing. |
| Ibudhou Marjing | ꯏꯕꯨꯙꯧ ꯃꯥꯔꯖꯤꯡ | North east | He's the God associated with horses, polo, sports, war, combat, battle, and animals. His only child is Lord Tolongkhomba. | He's the consort of Lady Humuleima, the daughter of Kurulen Sidaba. | He rides on Samadon Ayangba, a winged flying horse, with white complexion. |
| Wangbren | ꯋꯥꯡꯕ꯭ꯔꯦꯟ | South east | He's the God associated with water, diseases, death and plaque. | Anal Chanu Shangnulembi | He rides on a black tiger. |
| Koubru | ꯀꯩꯕ꯭ꯔꯨ | North west | He's the God associated with hunting, animals and wind. Legend says thunderstorm is due to the firing of his divine gun and cloudiness is due to the spreading of his clothes. | Kounu | He rides on Koubru Laishaa, a white elephant. |
| Salailen Sidaba | ꯁꯂꯥꯢꯂꯦꯟ ꯁꯤꯗꯕ | Zenith | He's the Supreme Being and the Sky God, who rules the heaven. | Leimarel Sidabi, Nong Leima and Tampha Lairembi. | He rides either on an elephant or on a winged horse. |
| Thongalel | ꯊꯣꯡꯉꯥꯂꯦꯜ | Nadir | He's the God of death and the ruler of the underworld kingdom. | Laikhurembi, Thongak Leima, Khamnung Kikoi Louonbi and Lainaotabi. | |

== Development ==
According to Meitei mythology, before the creation of the universe, there were four deities who guard four realms. These are the following:

| Old name of the deities | Modern name of the deities | Divine jurisdiction |
|---|---|---|
| Thawaa | Wangbren | Nonglam |
| Chengaa | Marjing | Mitlam |
| Yucheng | Thangjing | Eelam |
| Yuhaa | Koubru | Nungshitlam |

These four deities guard the four main directions before the creation of the universe.

However, the following deities are also added to the guardianship of the directions after the creation of the universe:

| Deities | Direction |
|---|---|
| Nongpok Ningthou | Nongpok (East) |
| Loya Lakpa | Nongchup (West) |
| Laireima Kounu | Awang (North) |
| Lok Ningthou | Makha (South) |

=== Four main directions ===
- Ibudhou Marjing:- He is the Guardian of the North East direction.
- Thangjing:- He is the Guardian of the South West direction.
- Lainingthou Koubru:- He is the guardian of the North West direction.
- Wangbren:- He is the guardian of the South East direction.

== See also ==
- Guardians of the directions, the Hindu equivalent.
- Norðri, Suðri, Austri and Vestri, the Norse equivalent.
