= Ngaikhong Khullen =

Ngaikhong Khullen Ngaikhong Khunjao
- Village
- Location in Manipur, India Ngaikhong Khullen (India)
- Coordinates: 24.6162439°N 93.7917742°E
- Country: India
- State: Manipur
- District: Bishnupur
- Founder: Ibudhou Ameba Khongaba

Government
  - Type: Tribal chief

Area
  - Total: 20.08799 km^{2} (7.75602 sq mi)

Population (2011)
  - Total: 5,256
  - Density: 261.6/km^{2} (677.7/sq mi)
- Time zone: UTC+5:30 (IST)
- PIN: 795126
- Vehicle registration: MN
- Coastline: 0 kilometres (0 mi)

Ngaikhong Khullen is a large village located near Loktak Lake,Bishnupur district, Manipur, India, with a total of 1,084 families residing.

== Geography & Hydrology ==
Two primary streams drain into Loktak Lake in this region. 1.Thabakhong Stream: Catchment area of 6.25 sq km. 2.Kaborok Stream: Catchment area of 12.50 sq km. Both streams flow into Yenapat, a sub-basin of Loktak Lake.

== Demographics ==
The village has a population of 5256, of which 2656 are male and 2600 are female, as per Population Census 2011.

The population of the children of age group 0-6 is 611, 12.58% of the total. The Average Sex Ratio is 979 which is lower than the Manipur state average of 985. The Child Sex Ratio per the census is 927, lower than the Manipur average of 930. The village has a higher literacy rate than Manipur. In 2011, the literacy rate of Ngaikhong Khullen village was 78.11% as compared to 76.94% of Manipur. In Ngaikhong Khullen male literacy stood at 89.49% while female literacy rate was 66.56%.

As per the constitution of India and Panchyati Raaj Act, the village is administrated by Sarpanch (Head of Village) who is the elected representative of the village.

Particular	Total	Male	Female
Population	5256	2656	2600
Child (0-6)	611	343	318
Schedule Tribe	22	19	3
Schedule Caste	3	2	1
Literacy	78.11%	89.49%	66.56%
Total workers	2643	1461	1182
Main workers	1799	0	0
Marginal workers	844	115	729

Source: Census 2011

== Administration ==
Ngaikhong Khullen is divided into 9 wards and each ward is represented by a Ward Member, also referred to as a Panch, who is directly elected by the villagers. The Ngaikhong Khullen Gram Panchayat is chaired by the president of the village, known as a Sarpanch. The term of the elected representatives is of five years. The Secretary of the panchayat is a non-elected representative, appointed by the state government of Manipur, to oversee the panchayat activities.

== Legend ==
One day, Angoupalba Yaibirel Sidaba found Khoiriphaba crying near a tree. He brought the boy to his home. He asked his family to take care of the boy. The clan members looked after the child like their own child. They named him Puthiba.

One day, Khoiriphaba heard some women talking about ow much his mother must have suffered for the loss of her child. Khoiriphaba immediately asked them about his mother, but none of them knew where to find her. So, he decided to search for his mother by himself.

God Khoriphaba descended from sky down to earth in search for his lost mother. He came to Moirang, near Khoiri Keithel. The sun had already set when he arrived. Not knowing what to do, he started crying. Thangjing and his consort Koiren Leima came to him. They came to know about the identity of the boy and took care of him.

Khoiriphaba grew up under the guardianship of the God Thangjing. He made many friends. When he was nine years old, he started wrestling, racing, and so on. He was always the champion of all the competitions making his friends jealous of him. So, one of his friends told him about how he grew up under the care of Thangjing. Khoriphaba was told that they would not allow him to play with them because he was an inferior God. Khoriphaba felt dejected for many days. Thangjing noticed it and asked him. Khoiriphaba narrated him the incident. So, Thangjing decided that Khoiriphaba should be sent to his mother without further delaying. He summoned all the 27 friends of Khoiriphaba. He asked them to challenge Khoiriphaba for wrestling and race championships. None were ready for the challenge. Then Thangjing asked them about a tug of war in which all of them would stand together at one side and Khoiriphaba alone at another side. There was a condition. If they won, they would be the winner. But if Khoiriphaba won, they should send Khoiriphaba off to his mother's place at Haorok Konthou, carrying him on a palanquin. The 27 friends accepted the challenge. But all of them got defeated in the hands of Khoiriphaba.

On the next day, the 27 friends proceeded for the journey with Khoiriphaba on a palanquin towards Haorok Konthou. They came from a long distance from Moirang. On the way, they came across a beautiful place. They could not control themselves to rest at the beautiful place for a while. They requested Khoiriphaba who agreed. The beautiful place where they rested was named Toubul (Old Manipuri: Toupul). Some friends were waiting for the resting friends at another place. The place where they waited was named Ngaikhong Khullen.

== Cottage industry ==
The people of this village have skill of unique craftsmanship called "Loo Saba" (loo means trap and saba means making) since ancient times. The type of product of this cottage industry is a traditional fishing trap made of woven bamboo popularly known as Kabaw Loo which has a trap door to prevent fish from escaping.

== Local clubs ==
Name of Clubs	Acronym	Founder President	Founder Secretary	YOR
The Raising Club	RC	Takhellambam Bira Singh	Lamabam Gyaneshwor Singh	1989
The Social Welfare Club	SWC	Khwairakpam Soden Singh	Maisnam Banan Singh (Banantomba)	1989
The Ideal Club	IC	Meisnam Modhu Singh	Moirangthem Baleshwor Singh	2001
The Ngaikhong Khullen Sports Association	NGKSA			
The Ngaikhong Khullen Youth Club	NYC	Khwairakpam Sudhon Singh	Khwairakpam Sanamatum Singh	

All Clubs Co-Ordinating Committee (ACCC) is an umbrella body representing above five clubs in the village Ngaikhong Khullen. Established on 8 February 2024, ACCC advocates for the rights of students, culture, sports, co-ordination among the clubs and development of this village.

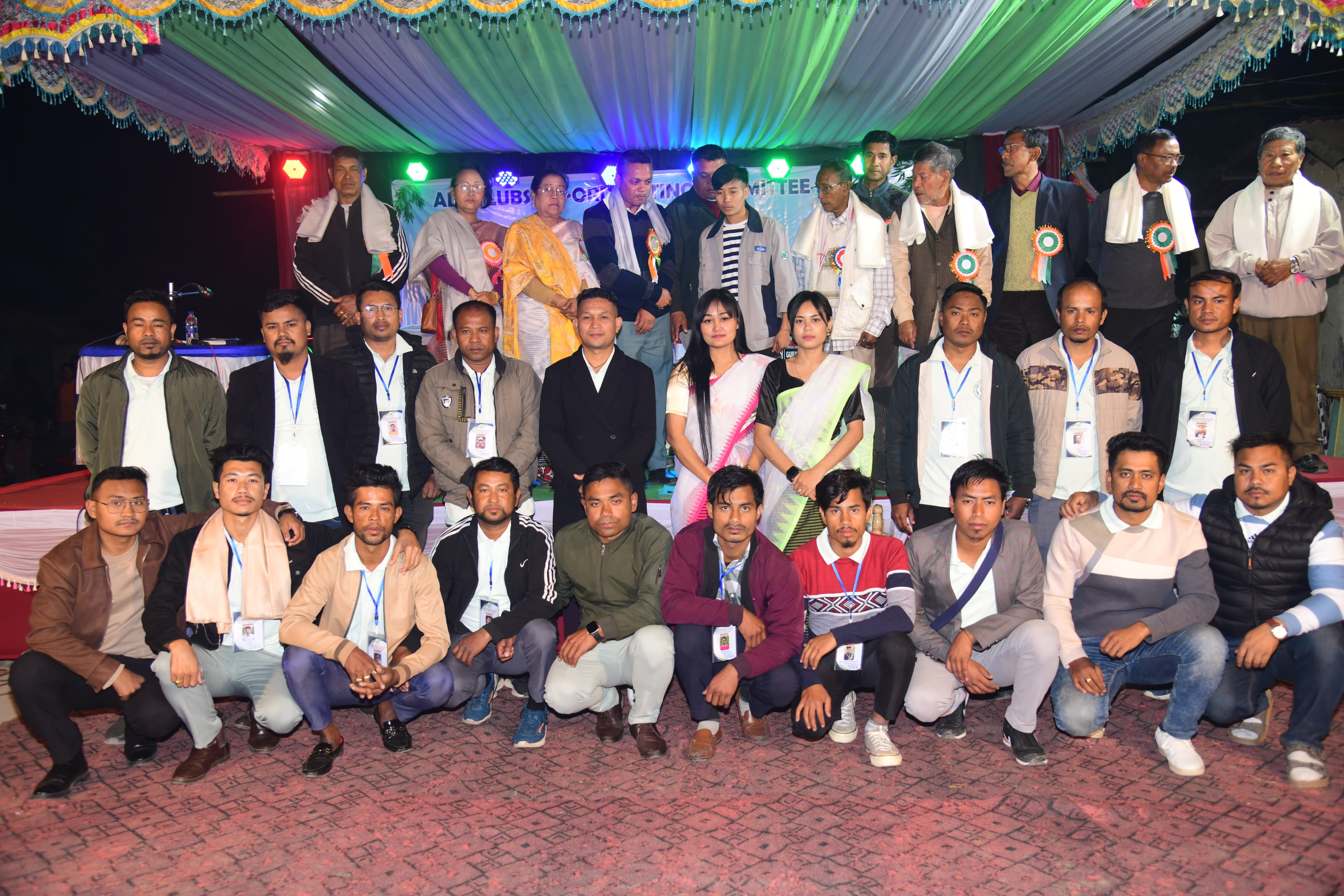
Group Photo of ACCC
