= Loktak Ima =

Meitei water goddess

- Personification of the Loktak lake Mother goddess of the sacred waters
- Member of Meitei goddesses
- Other names: Loktak Ema, Loktak Eemaa, Loktak Lairembi, Loktak Lairembee
- Affiliation: Meitei religion (Sanamahism) and Meitei mythology
- Major cult center: Manipur
- Abode: Loktak lake
- Gender: Female
- Region: Kangleipak (Meitei for 'Manipur')
- Ethnic group: Meitei ethnicity

Loktak Ima (Meitei: ꯂꯣꯛꯇꯥꯛ ꯏꯃꯥ, romanized: loktaak eemaa, lit. 'Mother Loktak'), also known as Loktak Lairembi (Note: also often misspelled as "Leirembi") (Meitei: ꯂꯣꯛꯇꯥꯛ ꯂꯥꯏꯔꯦꯝꯕꯤ, romanized: loktaak lairembee, lit. 'Goddess of Loktak' (Note: In Meitei language (officially called "Manipuri"), Meitei: ꯂꯥꯏꯔꯦꯝꯕꯤ, romanized: Lairembi) simply means a "goddess".)), is the personification of the Loktak lake, who is revered by the Meitei people as the mother goddess of the sacred waters of the Loktak lake. She is highly respected and venerated by the fishermen communities of the Meitei ethnicity living in and around the periphery of the Loktak lake. She is also considered as the fountainhead of Meitei culture. Her embodiment, the Loktak lake is associated with the epic of Khamba and Thoibi as well as that of Poubi Lai of Meitei mythology and folklore.

== Attributes ==
Loktak goddess is often compared to a lady with heart that is pure and kind. It is said that whenever she passes by, the water birds praise her by singing and the deers bow their heads. She is benevolent to fishes.

The Maibis (Meitei for 'priestesses') of traditional Meitei religion (Sanamahism) often sings of the grasslands, food and raw materials derived from the Loktak lake, which is believed to be the body of the Loktak Lairembi (Loktak goddess) herself. Loktak goddess is the symbol of the characters of independence and self-actualization of the women of Manipur.

== As a fish goddess ==
Loktak goddess is believed to be the one who is responsible for the replenishment of the fish population in the Loktak lake. According to traditional beliefs, there is no vanishing of the fish population no matter how much they catch fishes. The identity of Loktak goddess is also sometimes believed to be associated with Meitei goddess of water, Ereima.

== Guardianship ==
Meitei language quotation on the Mother Loktak

"Loktak Imma Eikkoigidi Patna Louchani"

English translation

"Mother Loktak is our paddy land"

The Meiteis acknowledge full reliance on the Loktak lake for their traditional occupations.

The Meitei people (living around the lake) consider the Loktak lake as their guardian. They believe the lake as their mother, as it is possible for them to depend upon the lake for their livelihoods, for their children and their family, only because of the grace bestowed upon them by the Mother Loktak.

== In literature ==
The Lore of Loktak

The Lore of Loktak
In the shadows of your footsteps
Many lives exist
On your nature's bounty
Many lives lean
O, beloved mother Loktak
O, beloved mother Loktak....

— from Ranbir Thouna's song, Loktak

Description in Meitei language literary works

| Description (in Meitei script) | Description (in Eastern Nagari script) | Meanings/Translations |
|---|---|---|
| ꯏꯃꯥ ꯂꯣꯛꯇꯥꯛ ꯂꯥꯏꯔꯦꯝꯕꯤ / ꯏꯔꯩꯃꯒꯤ ꯁꯥꯏꯑꯣꯟ ꯂꯧ / ꯏꯪꯅ ꯄꯣꯝꯁꯥꯠꯅꯔꯤꯕꯤ / ꯐꯧꯑꯣꯏꯕꯤꯅ ꯂꯨꯆꯤꯡꯕꯤ / ꯂꯥꯏ ꯆꯅꯨꯔꯥ ꯇꯔꯦꯠꯀꯤ / ꯍꯤ- ꯌꯥꯏ ꯈꯨꯗꯤꯡ ꯅꯥꯎꯄꯨꯕꯤ, / ꯆꯤꯡꯅꯨꯡ ꯂꯩꯃ ꯆꯤꯡꯁꯤꯡꯅꯕꯤ / ꯍꯥꯏꯅꯨ ꯂꯩꯃ ꯍꯥꯏꯁꯤꯡꯅꯕꯤ / ꯂꯦꯝꯂꯩ ꯉꯥꯔꯥꯛ ꯉꯥꯑꯣꯏꯕꯤ / ꯅꯤꯡꯉꯣꯜ ꯅꯨꯔꯥꯕꯤ, ꯀꯣꯂꯥꯡꯅꯨ / ꯇꯣꯏꯕꯤ ꯀꯦꯟꯃꯤꯟꯅꯕꯤꯒꯤ / ꯈꯣꯡꯒꯨꯜ ꯂꯤꯃ ꯇꯥꯔꯤꯕꯤ, / ꯆꯤꯡꯉꯨ ꯊꯥꯡꯖꯤꯡ ꯀꯣꯏꯔꯦꯜꯂꯥꯏ / ꯀꯧꯕ꯭ꯔꯨ ꯃꯥꯔꯖꯤꯡ ꯋꯥꯡꯕ꯭ꯔꯦꯟꯅ / ꯃꯦꯏꯒꯩ ꯃꯔꯤ ꯉꯥꯛꯂꯤꯕꯤ / ꯁꯥꯏꯑꯣꯟ ꯂꯥꯡꯑꯣꯟ ꯀꯌꯥꯒꯤ / ꯈꯣꯏꯊꯨꯝꯂꯕ ꯋꯥꯔꯤꯅ / ꯏꯔꯣꯟꯅꯨꯡꯗ ꯊꯨꯞꯂꯤꯕ / ꯏꯃꯥ ꯅꯪꯒꯤ ꯃꯤꯡꯈꯩꯔꯣꯟ / ꯁꯛꯄ ꯉꯝꯂꯣꯏ ꯀꯩꯗꯧꯅꯨꯡ।Loktak Sheitharol, page no. 1 (ꯂꯣꯛꯇꯥꯛ ꯁꯩꯊꯥꯔꯣꯜ , ꯂꯥꯃꯥꯏ :꯱)। | ইমা লোক্তাক লাইরেম্বী / ঈরৈমাগী শাইওন লৌ / ঈংনা পোমশাত্নরিবী / ফৌওইবীনা লুচিংবী / লাই চনুরা তরেকী / হী- য়াই খুদিং নাউপুবী, / চীংনুং লৈমা চিংশিংনবী / হাইনু লৈমা হাইশিংনবী / লেমলৈ ঙারাক ঙাওইবী / নিংঙোল নুরাবী, কোলাংনু / তোইবী কেনমিন্নবীগী / খোঙ্গুল লীম তারিবী, / চীংঙু থাংজীং কোয়রেল্লাই / কৌব্রূ মারজীং বাংরেন্না / মায়গৈ মরি ঙাক্লিবী / শাইওন লাংওন কয়াগী / খোয়থুলবা বারীনা / ঈরোন্নুংদা থুপ্লিবা / ইমা নঙগী মিংখৈরোল/ শকপা ঙম্লোই কৈদৌনুং।Loktak Sheitharol, page no. 1 (লোক্তাক শৈথারোল, লা:১)। | Mother Loktak Goddess / O the incarnation of Ireima / Peacefully blooming one / Led by Phouoibi / Of the seven divine ladies / The possessor of all the gems, / The lady who pulls inside the mountains / The waving lady who waves / The lady who is fish among the fishes / Virgin lady, Kolangnu / Toibi Kenminnabigi / Tracing the foot paths, / God Thangching Koirellai / Koupalu Marjing Wangpulen're / Guarding you from four directions / Of the many incarnations / Those are sweet stories / Existing inside the underwater / O mother, your many names / Couldn't be sung completely ever.Loktak Sheitharol, page no. 1 |
| ꯊꯥꯡꯖꯤꯡ ꯆꯤꯡꯁꯥꯡ ꯃꯁꯥꯏꯀꯣꯜ ꯊꯨꯞꯆꯩ ꯃꯔꯨꯝ ꯂꯣꯛꯇꯥꯛ ꯂꯥꯏꯔꯦꯝꯕꯤ ꯂꯤꯔꯛꯏ ꯋꯥꯔꯤ ꯂꯩꯁꯦꯝꯉꯩ ꯊꯣꯛꯈꯤ ꯅꯁꯥꯏꯀꯣꯟꯁꯤꯗ ꯃꯨꯠꯅꯥꯏꯗ꯭ꯔꯕ ꯋꯥꯔꯤ, ꯁꯥꯌꯣꯜ ꯇꯔꯦꯠ, ꯈꯣꯏꯌꯨꯝ ꯂꯥꯡꯑꯣꯟ ꯆꯪꯈꯣꯟꯕ ꯂꯩꯃꯔꯦꯜ ꯂꯥꯡꯑꯣꯟ ꯅꯤꯡꯊꯤꯕꯤ ꯀꯥꯎꯉꯝꯗ꯭ꯔꯕ ꯋꯥꯔꯤꯅ ꯑꯣꯏꯔꯤ ꯈꯣꯔꯤꯔꯣꯜ ꯄꯨꯛꯀꯩ ꯑꯊꯣꯏꯕ ... । | থাংজিং চীংশাং মশাইকোল থুপচৈ মরুম লোক্তাক লাইরেম্বী লীরকি বারী লৈশেমঙৈ থোকখি নশাইকোনসিদা মুৎনাইদ্র ৱারী, শায়োল তরেৎ, খোইয়ুম লাংওন চঙখোনবা লৈমরেল লাংওন নীংথিবী কাউঙমদ্রবা ৱারীনা ওইরি খোরিরোল পুক্কৈ অথোইবা ... । | In the region of Thangjing Hill range Goddess of Loktak seek asylum Narrating the creation myth It happened on your lap Immortal tales, seven Epic cycles of incarnations, Perfect incarnation of divinity Incarnation of Leimarel It is an unforgettable story Perfection of the granary of literature ... |

== In popular culture ==
- Loktak Lairembee (film) (English: Lady of the Lake) : a 2016 Indian Meitei language film directed and produced by Haobam Paban Kumar.

== See also ==
- Loktak Folklore Museum
- Een Chingba (Khamba Thoibi)
