= Koujeng Leima =

Ancient Meitei Goddess

- Goddess
- Member of Lairembis
- Other names: Koujeng Lairembi (Old Manipuri: Koucheng Lailempi)
- Texts: Puyas
- Gender: Female
- Region: Manipur
- Ethnic group: Meitei
- Festivals: Lai Haraoba
- Consort: Koupalu (Koubru)

Koujeng Leima (Meitei: ꯀꯧꯖꯦꯡ ꯂꯩꯃ) is a goddess in Sanamahism, the indigenous religion of Manipur. She is a wife of God Koupalu. She was a tribal woman, but later worshipped by the Meiteis as a goddess. She is one of the nine goddesses (laibenthous) who participated in the festival of God Thangjing.

== Mythology ==
Legends say that Koujeng Leima is a tribal woman, so she has a separate home and is not allowed to participate in the assembly of the gods and goddesses at the Lai Haraoba of the god Koubru. In the evening of the day of the Lai Lamthokpa ceremony, the god Koubru, his wife, his son, and his daughter-in-law visited the shrine of the goddess Koujeng Leima.

== Worship ==
During the period of political turmoil in September, 2009, many pilgrims offered prayers to Koujeng Leima in her sacred shrine of the Koujeng Leima Lairembi Laiphamlen in Sekmai. They invoked her for the success of the movement led by the Apunba Lup and for the restoration of peace in Manipur.

== Namesake ==
The "Koujeng Leima Youth Development Organisation" is an active youth group in Sekmai region of Manipur. It functions in the actions against drugs and intoxicants. On 31 December 2013 and the New Year Day of 2014, the organization imposed a ban on picnicking in Sekmai. Later, the ban was lifted. However, they cautioned people not to drink alcohol and become drunk.

== See also ==
- Kounu
- Nungthel Leima
- Loyalakpa

== Bibliography ==
- Division, India Census (1969). Minapur. Office of the Registrar General. p. 15.
- Lancha, Ningthouja. KANGLA LANPUNG Volume VIII Issue II: Summer 2014. RK Sanatomba Memorial Trust, Imphal.
- General, India Office of the Registrar (1962). Census of India, 1961. Manager of Publications. p. 48.
