= Samaton =

Flying winged horse in Meitei mythology

- Divine ancestor of Meitei horse (Manipuri pony)
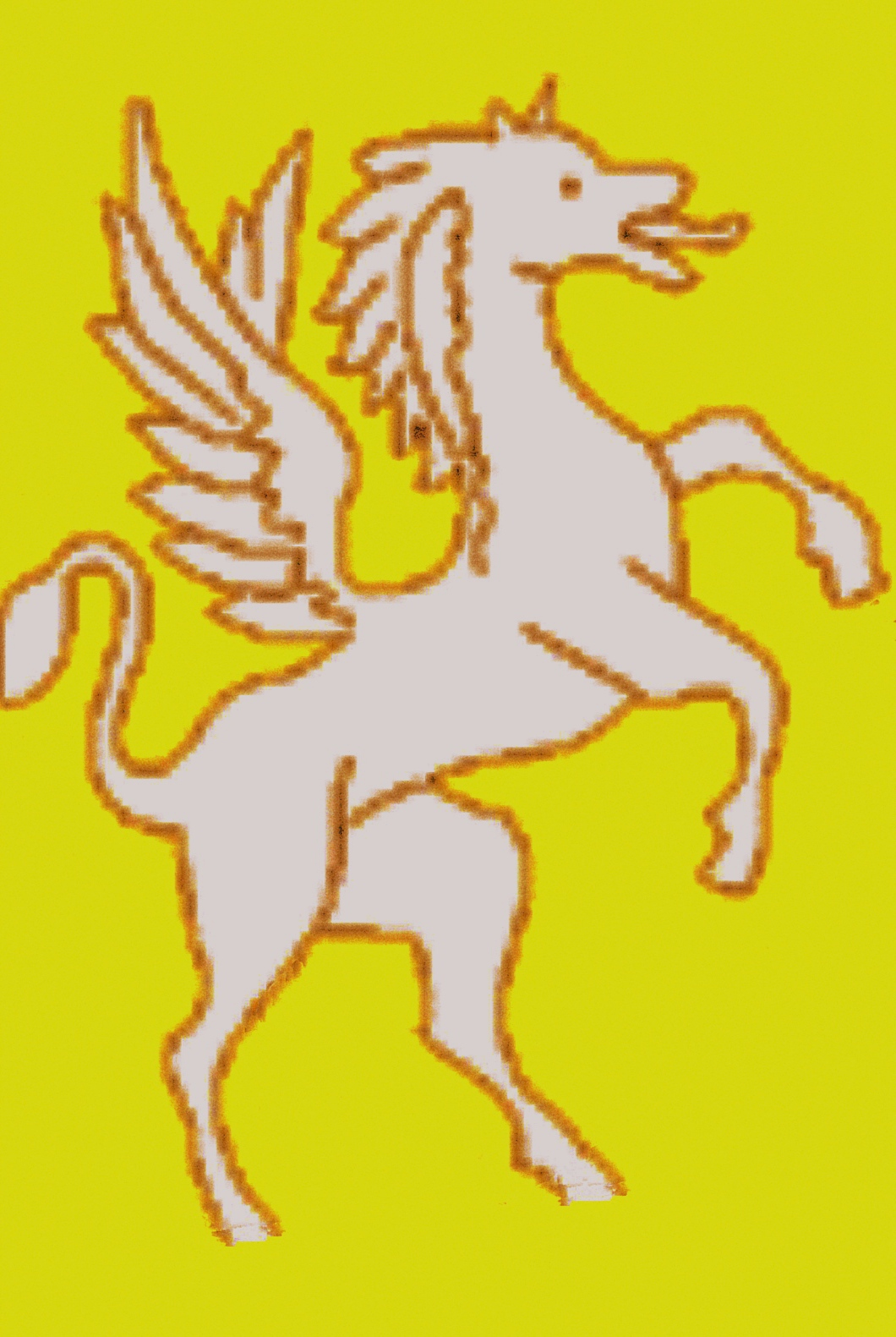
- Other names: Samadon Ayangba, Shamadon Ayangba, Samaton Ayangpa, Shamaton Ayangpa
- Affiliation: Meitei mythology (Manipuri mythology) and Meitei religion (Sanamahism)
- Major cult centre: Heingang hills
- Abode: Heingang hill
- Gender: Male
- Region: Manipur
- Festivals: Lai Haraoba

Genealogy
- Spouse: Ngangrubi

Equivalents
- Greek: Pegasus

Samaton (/saa-ma-ton/) or Samadon (/saa-ma-don/) is a mythical winged divine horse in Meitei mythology. He is one of the most recognised creatures in Meitei folklore. Legend says that Samaton is the ancestor of the present day Manipuri pony (Meitei horse). The Leithak Leikharol describes Samaton as a primordial horse associated with Meitei cosmology. It is created by Sanamahi to attack on Pakhangba. Later, it became the mounting creature of God Marjing. It is also called "Shamadon Ayangba" (Meitei: ꯁꯃꯗꯣꯟ ꯑꯌꯥꯡꯕ) or "Shamaton Ayangpa" (Old Manipuri: ꯁꯃꯇꯣꯟ ꯑꯌꯥꯡꯄ) due to free variation of words in Meitei language (Manipuri language).

Samaton is praised in the ritual song of Ougri sung during the Lai Haraoba festival. Samaton is considered very important to Meitei culture because it is created from the body of God Sanamahi. During the deification of Meitei kings, Samaton became associated with kings as it was a divine being. So, Samaton became the insignia of royalty.

== In popular culture ==
- Hada Samadon Ayangba is a folk song sung by Mangka Mayanglambam. The song was sung in the Manipur Polo International 2014. It was also sung at the Sangai festival in the same year.

== In heraldry ==
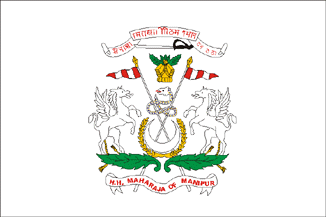

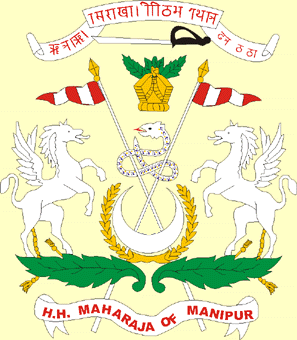

== Other websites ==
- Roy, L. Somi (2021-06-21). And That Is Why... Manipuri Myths Retold. Penguin Random House India Private Limited. ISBN 978-93-91149-65-9.
