= Leithak Leikharol =

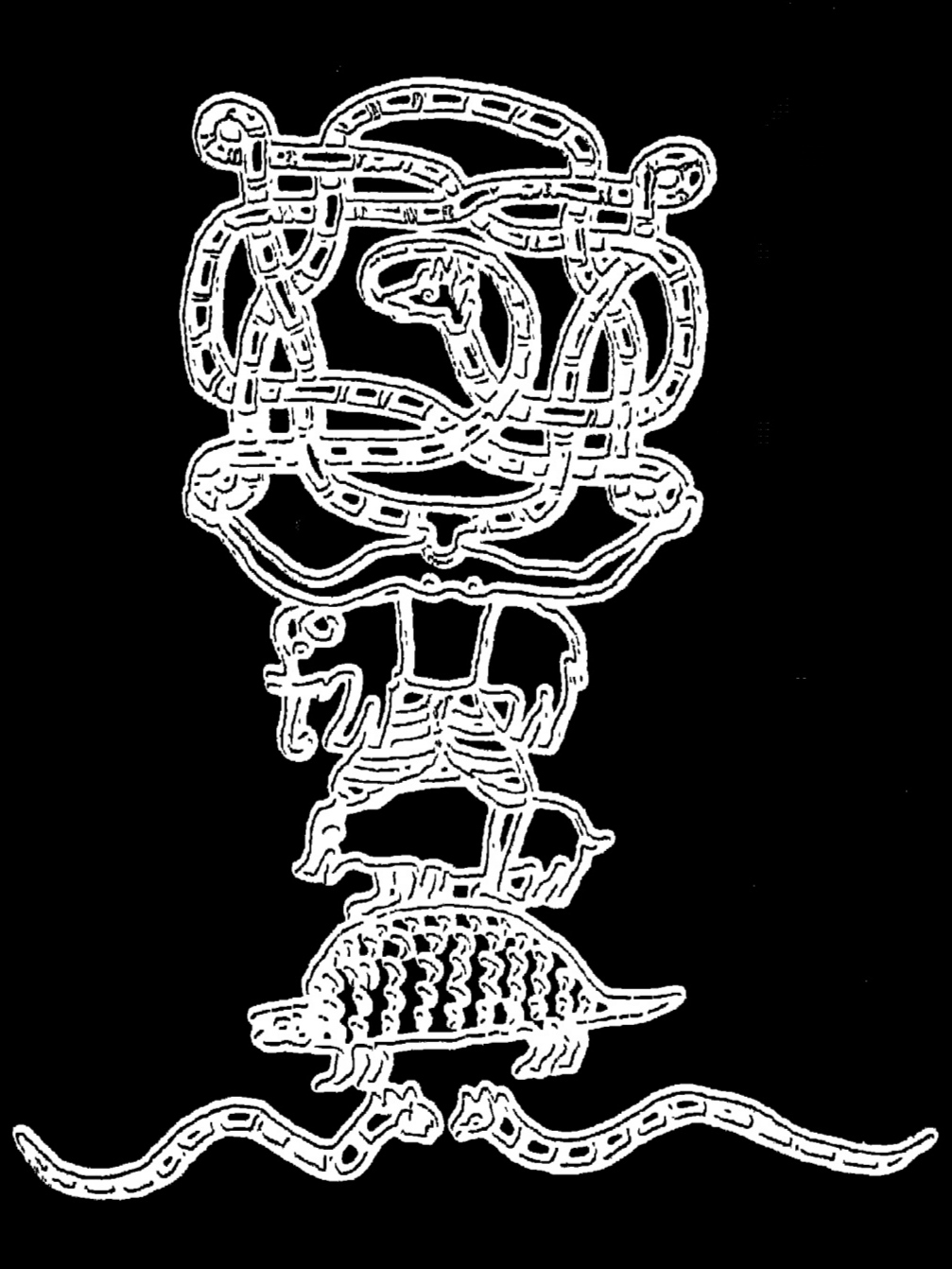
The model of the universe as described in the "Leithak Leikharol".

Leithak Leikharol (Meitei: ꯂꯩꯊꯛ ꯂꯩꯈꯥꯔꯣꯜ) (lit. Of Heaven and netherworld), also spelt as the Leithak Leikhalol, is an ancient literary narrative work (puya), about the creation of the universe, genealogy of kings, moral teachings and mythology. It mentions some goddesses including Leimarel Sidabi, Nongthang Leima and Panthoibi. Goddess Leimarel Sidabi is said to be the omniscient. It states that goddess Panthoibi slays a demon.

== See also ==
- Korouhanba
- Samadon Ayangba
