= Thangjing Temple, Moirang =

Meitei temple in Manipur, India

Thangjing Temple
- Thangjing Laishang (Thangjing Laisang)
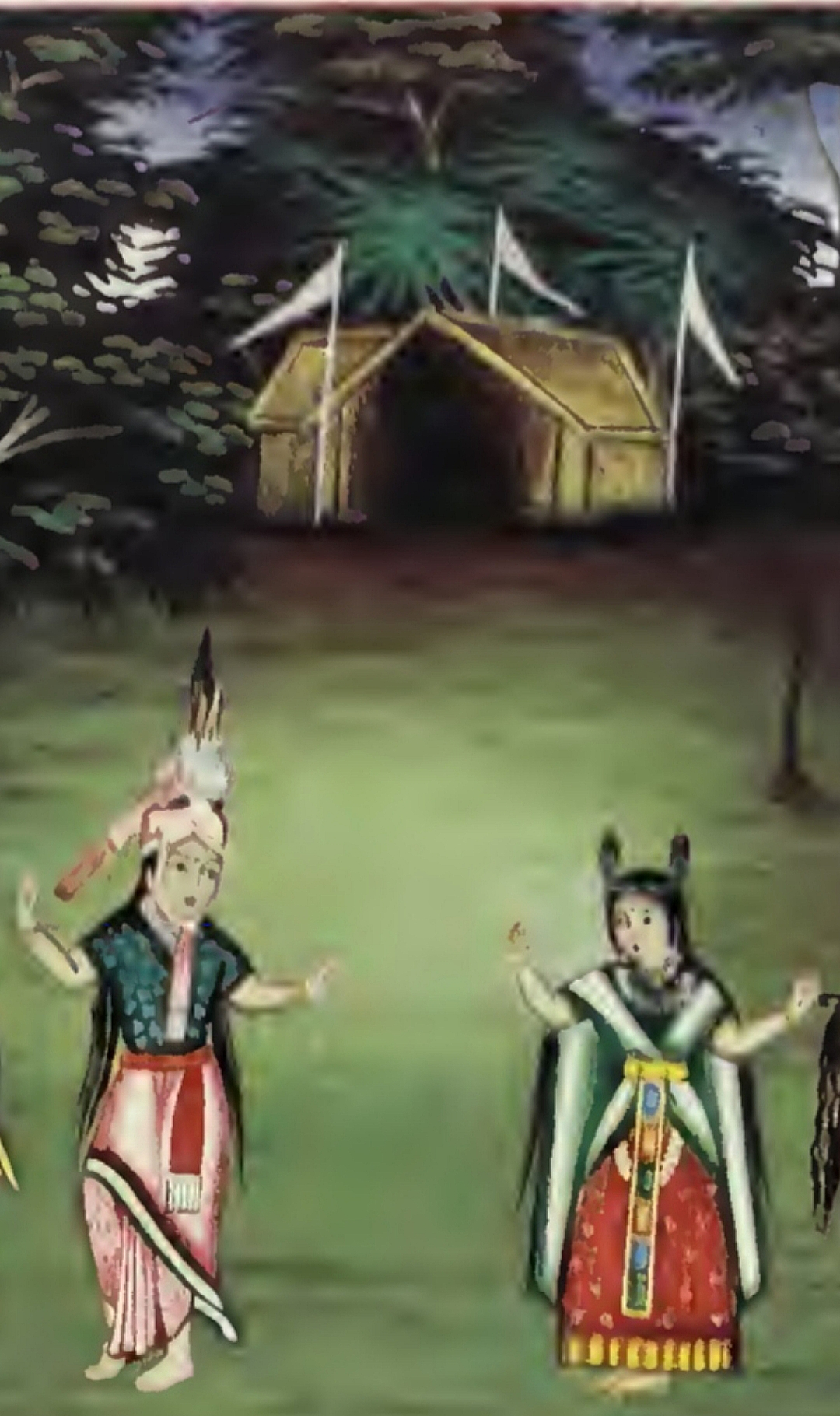
- Khuman Khamba and Moirang Thoibi performing the Khamba Thoibi Jagoi dance at the premise of Thangjing Temple during the Lai Haraoba festival in Ancient Moirang.

- Location within Manipur Location within India Location within Asia

Religion
- Affiliation: Sanamahism
- Sect: Moirang
- District: Bishnupur district
- Province: Manipur
- Region: Moirang
- Deity: Thangching (Thangjing)
- Festival: Lai Haraoba
- Patron: Government of Manipur

Location
- State: Manipur
- Country: India
- Interactive map of Thangjing Temple
- Coordinates: 24.497501°N 93.77910°E

Architecture
- Type: Meitei architecture
- Style: Meitei architecture
- Founder: Kings of the Moirang dynasty
- Creator: Kings of the Moirang dynasty

Specifications
- Temple: 1
- Shrine: 1

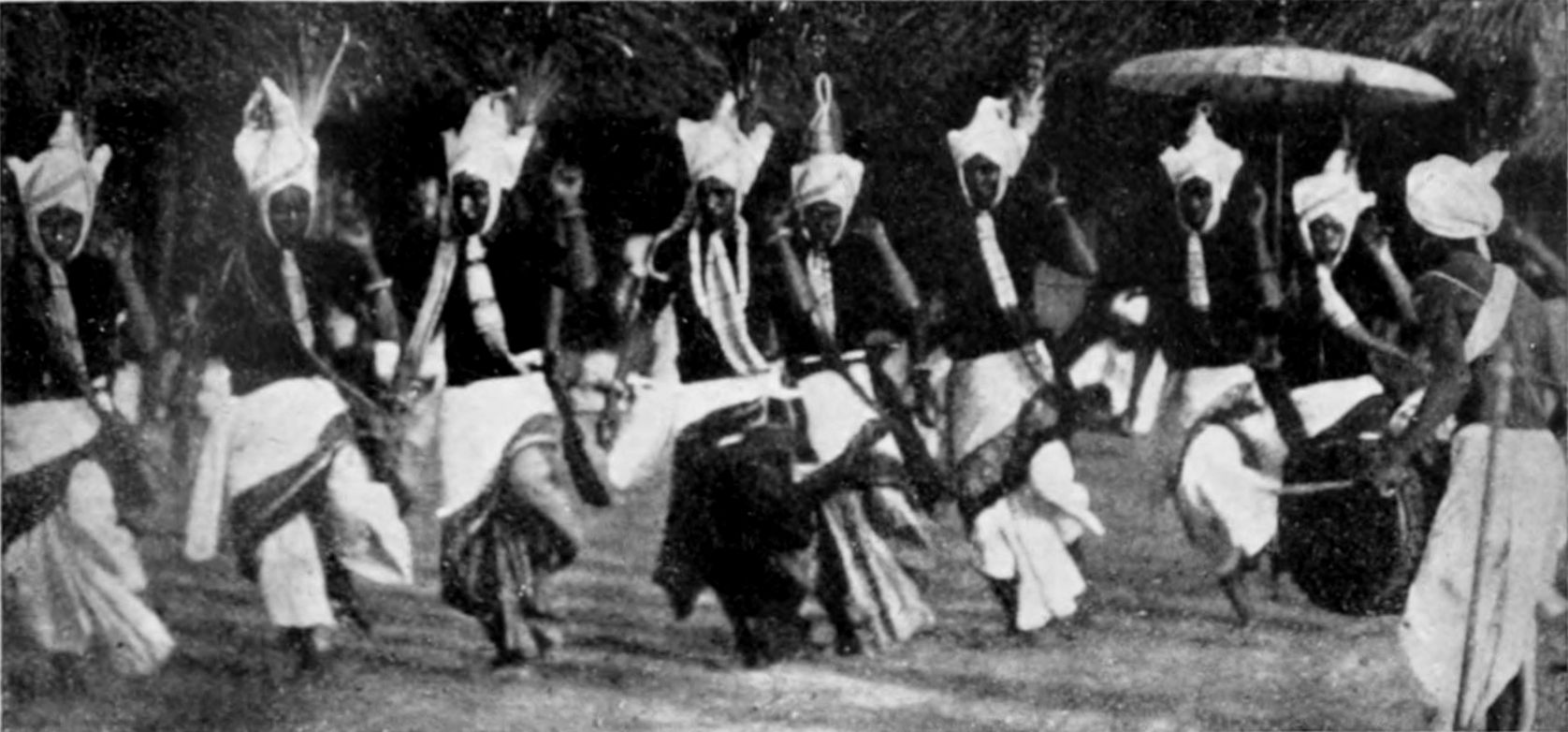
Priests (Maibas) dancing together to please Thangching in his temple in Moirang.

The Thangjing Temple (also known as the Ibudhou Thangjing Temple) (Note: written in traditional Meitei Mayek script as (Meitei: ꯏꯕꯨꯙꯧ ꯊꯥꯡꯖꯤꯡ ꯂꯥꯏꯁꯪ, romanized: /ee-boo-dhou thaang-jing laai-sang/, Old Manipuri: ꯏꯄꯨꯊꯧ ꯊꯥꯡꯆꯤꯡ ꯂꯥꯢꯁꯪ, romanized: /ee-poo-thou thaang-ching laai-shang/)) is a historical, religious site located in Moirang, within the Bishnupur district of Manipur, India. It serves as the primary seat of worship for Thangching (also known as Thangjing), a deity in Sanamahism, the indigenous polytheistic religion of the Meitei civilization. The temple complex is considered one of the most culturally vital pilgrimage sites, and ritual centers in the Manipur's Imphal valley, deeply connected with the region's classical Meitei literature, folklore, and socio-political history. The temple is located very close to the banks of the Loktak Lake.

Traditionally, the millennium-old legend of Khamba and Thoibi is closely associated with the sacred temple. The legend holds that the Khamba Thoibi Jagoi, a classical dance of Meitei heritage, was first performed at the temple (in front of the deity's image) by Khuman Khamba and Moirang Thoibi during the Lei Langba ritual.

The Temple of Thangjing preserves and displays the royal attires of the 12th-century kings of the Moirang dynasty.

== Mythological and folkloric foundations ==
The cultural prominence of the Thangjing Temple is fundamentally rooted in its association with the Moirang Shayon or Moirang Saiyon (the seven divine epic cycles of incarnations in Moirang or cycles of births), which forms a core epic framework of the Moirang Kangleirol in Meitei mythology. According to traditional belief systems, Thangjing ordained these mortal incarnations to manifest his divine will and explore human destiny.

- The Epic of Khamba and Thoibi: The most celebrated of these cycles is the 12th-century epic of Khamba and Thoibi. The Thangjing Temple serves as the central setting for many important episodes of this saga.
- Origin of Khamba Thoibi Jagoi: Folklore dictates that the classical dance form, Khamba Thoibi Jagoi, was originally performed by the couple within the temple premises as a ritualistic offering to please Thangjing.

== Historical evolution ==
Historically, the Thangjing Temple functioned as more than a religious sanctuary; it was a powerful institution of the Moirang kingdom, an independent principality before its gradual integration into the unified kingdom of Manipur.

Ancient Meitei literature records that the rulers of the Moirang clan (Moirang Yek Salai) derived their sovereign legitimacy directly from their role as chief patrons of the deity Thangjing. The coronation rituals of the Moirang kings required formal pilgrimage and submission to the deity at this specific site to secure peace, seasonal rainfall, and immunity from epidemics for the kingdom. During times of geopolitical conflict or natural disaster, the reigning monarchs would perform specialized state rituals at the temple to avert catastrophe.

== Religious practices and ritualistic significance ==
The Thangjing Temple remains the institutional epicenter for the preservation of pre-Hindu, traditional religious rituals in Manipur's Imphal valley, existing alongside the region's later adoption of Vaishnavite Hinduism.

The temple is renowned for hosting the "Moirang Lai Haraoba" (also known as "Thangjing Haraoba"), an annual ritualistic festival celebrated during the summer months (typically around April, May, June). Unlike other variations of the Lai Haraoba festival across Manipur, the Moirang iteration strictly adheres to specific archaic liturgical protocols managed by specialized priests (Maibas) and priestesses (Maibis). The festival includes complex, highly structured ritual dances that reenact the Meitei cosmogony, representing the creation of the universe, the human body, and the subsequent evolution of agriculture and civilization. The festival acts as an annual communal gathering where traditional hierarchy, kinship ties, and village lineages are reaffirmed through structured participation in processionals and devotional offerings to Thangjing and his two eponymous consorts, named Thangjing Leima, also known as Koiren Leima.

== See also ==
- Moirang (linguistics)
- Thangjing Hill
- Committee on Protection and Preservation of the Historic Rights of Koubru and Thangjing Hill Ranges
- Sanamahi Temple
- Sanamahi Kiyong Temple
- Pakhangba Temple, Kangla
- Hiyangthang Lairembi Temple
