= Loyalakpa =

God in Meitei mythology

- Guardian God of the Western Direction
- Member of Maikei Ngaakpa Lais and Lam Lais
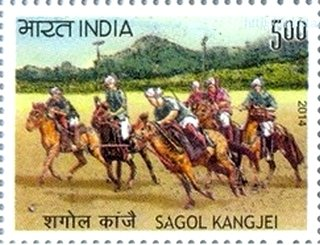
- God Loyalakpa is one of the 14 players of polo (Sagol Kangjei) in Meitei mythology
- Other names: Tollomkhomba
- Affiliation: Sanamahism)
- Major cult center: Phayeng and Sekmai
- Animals: Meitei horse
- Mount: Manipuri pony
- Gender: Male
- Region: Manipur
- Ethnic group: Meitei ethnicity
- Festivals: Lai Haraoba

Genealogy
- Parents: Koupalu or Marjing (father); Kounu or Humu Leima (mother)
- Consort: Thoudu Nungthel Leima

Loyalakpa (Meitei: ꯂꯣꯌꯥꯔꯥꯛꯄ) is a God in Sanamahism, the indigenous religion of Manipur. He is best known for wrestling with Khoriphaba during the Lai Haraoba festival. He is the consort of goddess Thoudu Nungthel Leima. He is one of the ten kingly gods (or ten divine kings) in Meitei religion.

== Description ==
Among the deities, Loyalakpa and Khoriphaba are the best wrestlers. The two powerful gods wrestled during the Lai Haraoba festival.

== Mythology ==
When the divine polo match was played among the gods, Loyalakpa participated in the southern team. His team was led by God Thangjing while his opponent's team (northern team) was led by God Marjing.

== Cults and shrines ==
The main deities assembled in the Lai Haraoba of the Phayeng are almost similar to those of the Sekmai. God Loyalakpa is one of these deities. God Loyalakpa and other deities including Panam Ningthou, Pureiromba and Koubru hold the special position of the Chakpa Haraoba (one of the 4 types of Lai Haraoba festival).

== Namesakes ==
=== Mountain peak ===
Loyalakpa is one of the four sacred mountain peaks of the Meitei people. The others are Koubru, Kounu and Thangjing. These names of the peaks are named after the respective presiding gods.

== Related pages ==
- Koupalu (Koubru) - Northwest protector
- Marjing - Northeast protector
- Thangjing - Southwest protector
- Wangbren - Southeast protector
