= Heibok Ching =

Hill in Imphal Valley, Manipur, India

- Heipok Ching

Highest point
- Elevation: 921 m (3,022 ft)
- Coordinates: 24°44′06″N 93°55′00″E

Naming
- Etymology: fruit bearing mountain
- Native name: Meitei: ꯍꯩꯕꯣꯛ ꯆꯤꯡ
- Defining authority: Government of Manipur

Geography
- Country: India
- State: Manipur
- Region: Imphal Valley
- District: Imphal West district
- Subdivision: Langthabal

Heibok Ching (Meitei: ꯍꯩꯕꯣꯛ ꯆꯤꯡ), also known as Heipok Ching (Meitei: ꯍꯩꯄꯣꯛ ꯆꯤꯡ), is a hill located in the Langthabal region of Imphal West district of Manipur, India. Its biodiversity is protected as a reserve forest by the Government of Manipur. It is regarded as a sacred hill in the culture of Manipur.

== Former status ==
The Government of Manipur published a gazette notification on 2 December 2014, giving Heibok Ching the status of a revenue village, under the name “68-Heibok Ching”, in accordance to the Section 2(w) of the Manipur Land Revenue & Land Reforms Act, 1960.

== Current status ==
In 2024, the Government of Manipur took the concerns about issues of global warming and the significance of Heibok Ching in protecting environment and biodiversity. Thus, they gave Heibok Ching the status of a Reserved Forest under the section 4 of Indian Forest Act, 1927.

== In Meitei mythology ==
In Meitei mythology and folklore of Manipur, the Heibok (Meitei: ꯍꯩꯄꯣꯛ) is associated with the story of a mythical giant bird named Kakyen (Meitei: ꯀꯛꯌꯦꯟ). It was believed that the dead bodies of people disposed in a river (erstwhile Liwa River) near this hill, were picked up by the colossal avian creature.

== In Meitei literature ==
Heibok Ching (Meitei: ꯍꯩꯕꯣꯛ ꯆꯤꯡ) is mentioned in the Meitei language novel named "Madhabi" (Meitei: ꯃꯥꯙꯕꯤ), authored by Kamal Singh (Meitei: ꯀꯃꯜ ꯁꯤꯡꯍ), as a beautiful place where the two lovers Dhiren and Madhabi meet.

== See also ==
- Heingang Ching
- Nongmaiching Ching
