= Toubul =

- village
- Location in Manipur, India Toubul (India)
- Coordinates: 24.6213°N 93.7934°E
- Country: India
- State: Manipur
- District: Bishnupur
- Elevation: 776 m (2,546 ft)

Population (2011)
  - Total: 4,542

Languages
  - Official: Meiteilon (Manipuri)
- Time zone: UTC+5:30 (IST)
- Vehicle registration: MN

Toubul is a village in the Bishnupur district of Manipur, India, with a total population of around 4044 people as per the 2001 census. The village is surrounded by farmlands in the west, north, and south, and by Loktak Lake in the east. Farming and fishery are the main sources of livelihood for the residents. However, Toubul is also one of the most affected villages due to the hydroelectric power generation plant from Loktak lake, which happens to be the biggest freshwater lake in north-east India.

The village is located at 24.6213°N 93.7934°E. Toubul is situated 2 km east of the district headquarters, Bishnupur, and approximately 30 kilometres (19 mi) south of Manipur's capital city, Imphal. The village is easily accessible via inter-village routes from neighboring villages and also by water from the other side of Loktak Lake. A 14 km-long Bishnupur-Mayang Imphal road, which bypasses Toubul and Loktak Lake, has been completed, including the construction of some bridges. Historically, it is believed that in ancient times, Tongjei Maril used this route for transportation and commerce.

It is not well known when the inhabitants of Toubul village started settling and farming. However, there are reports that suggest Toubul is as old as the Moirang Kingdom, as cited in the story of Khamba-Thoibi.

The village is believed to be the birthplace of Bhaktisvarupa Damodar Swami. His hospital cum tourist resort is currently under construction under the aegis of the International Society for Krishna Consciousness (ISKCON), also known as the Hare Krishna movement.

In Toubul village, there are 921 families residing, and the total population is 4542, consisting of 2264 males and 2278 females, according to the Population Census of 2011. The population of children aged 0-6 is 544, accounting for 11.98% of the total population. The average Sex Ratio in Toubul is 1006, which is higher than the Manipur state average of 985. However, the Child Sex Ratio in the village is 915, which is lower than the Manipur average of 930.

Toubul has a slightly lower literacy rate compared to Manipur. In 2011, the literacy rate in the village was 75.79%, while Manipur's overall literacy rate was 76.94%. The male literacy rate stood at 83.99%, and the female literacy rate was 67.74%.

As per the Constitution of India and the Panchayati Raj Act, Toubul is administrated by a Sarpanch (Head of the Village) who is an elected representative. The village is also home to some of the country's elite sports personalities.

== Toubul and surrounding ==
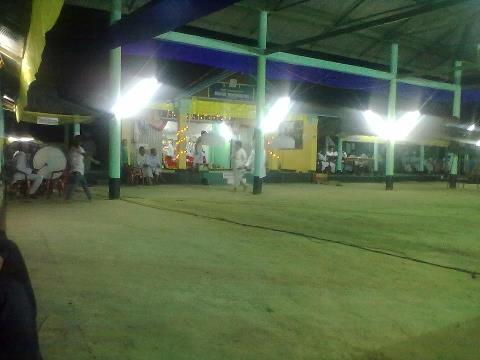
The Toubul Ibudhou Yangoiningthou, the old aged culture

The Toubul Ibudhou Sorarel and Yangoiningthou Seva Committee is celebrating the Ibudhou Yangoiningthou Lai Haraoba every year since the time immemorial. Each and every household of Toubul take part in the 10–15 days celebration. Maiba and Maibee play important roles by rendering the best services to the Ibudhou Yangoiningthou during these days with the offerings of flowers, fruits and vegetables followed by Lai Haraoba Jagoi (a typical Manipuri dance). At the end of the festival, it is very common to conclude with a sporting event such as Mukna (a kind of wrestling).

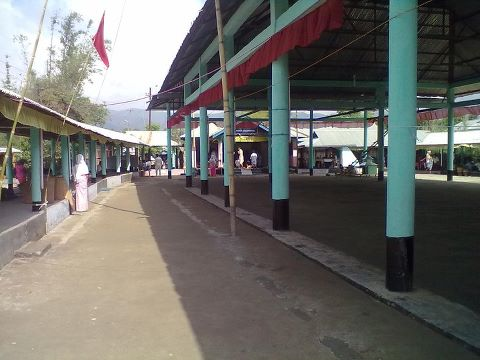
A side view of LAI SUMANG

== Geography, vegetation and climate ==
The east of Toubul is covered with lush greenery.

The villagers depend on the fishing mainly at the surrounding. The food security and the hurdles faced by the villages are highlighted in a 2010 report. But the polluted water devastates both fish and human.

In 2012, a rare bird species, Glossy Ibis, has been spotted in and around Toubul. The juxtaposition of Toubul and Loktak is a well known natural habitat of numerous species of wild and migratory birds. It is feared that this well balanced eco-system may be disturbed by human advances and called for protection.

== Gallery ==
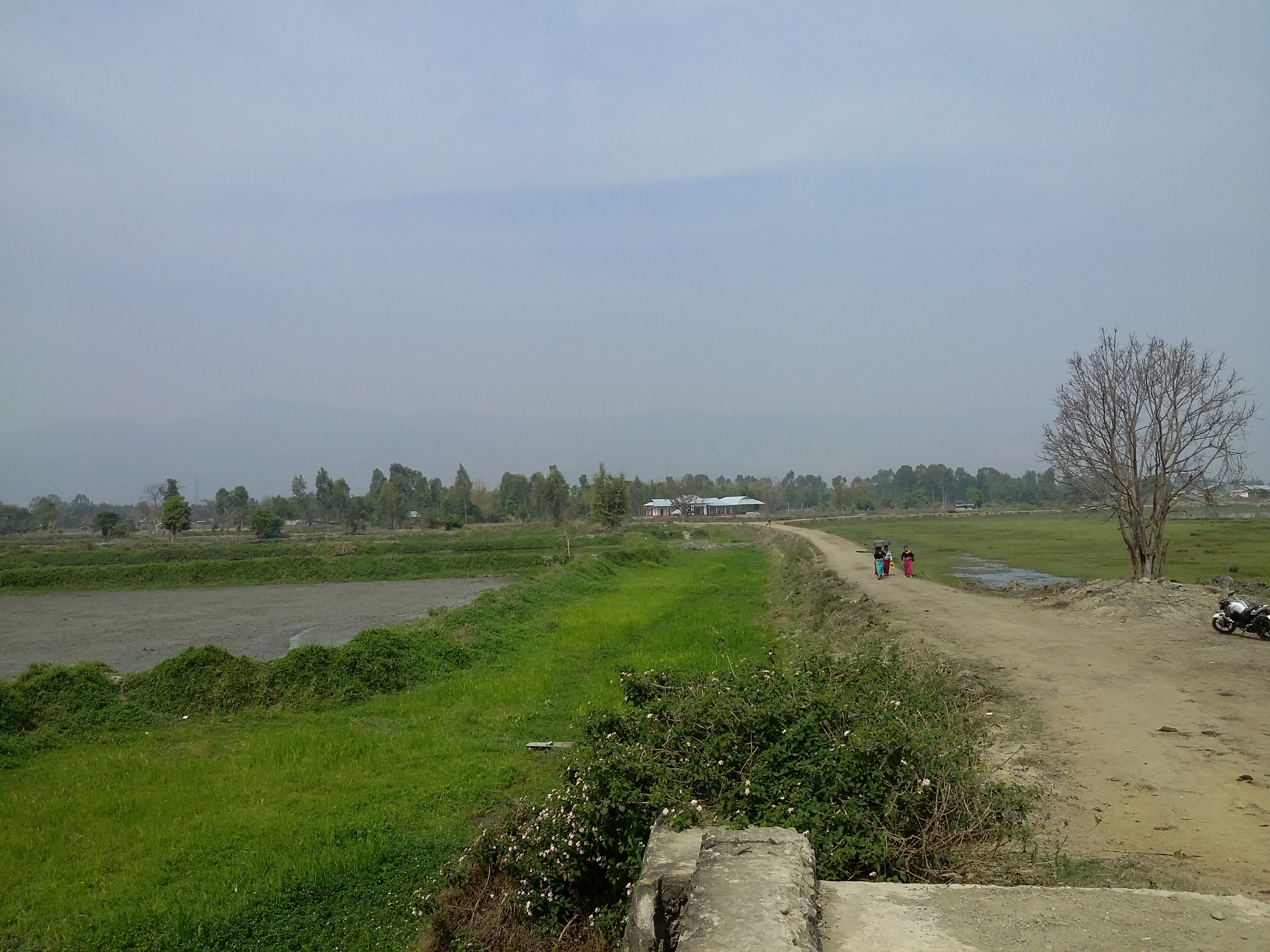
Toubul Paatmang on 15 March 2015

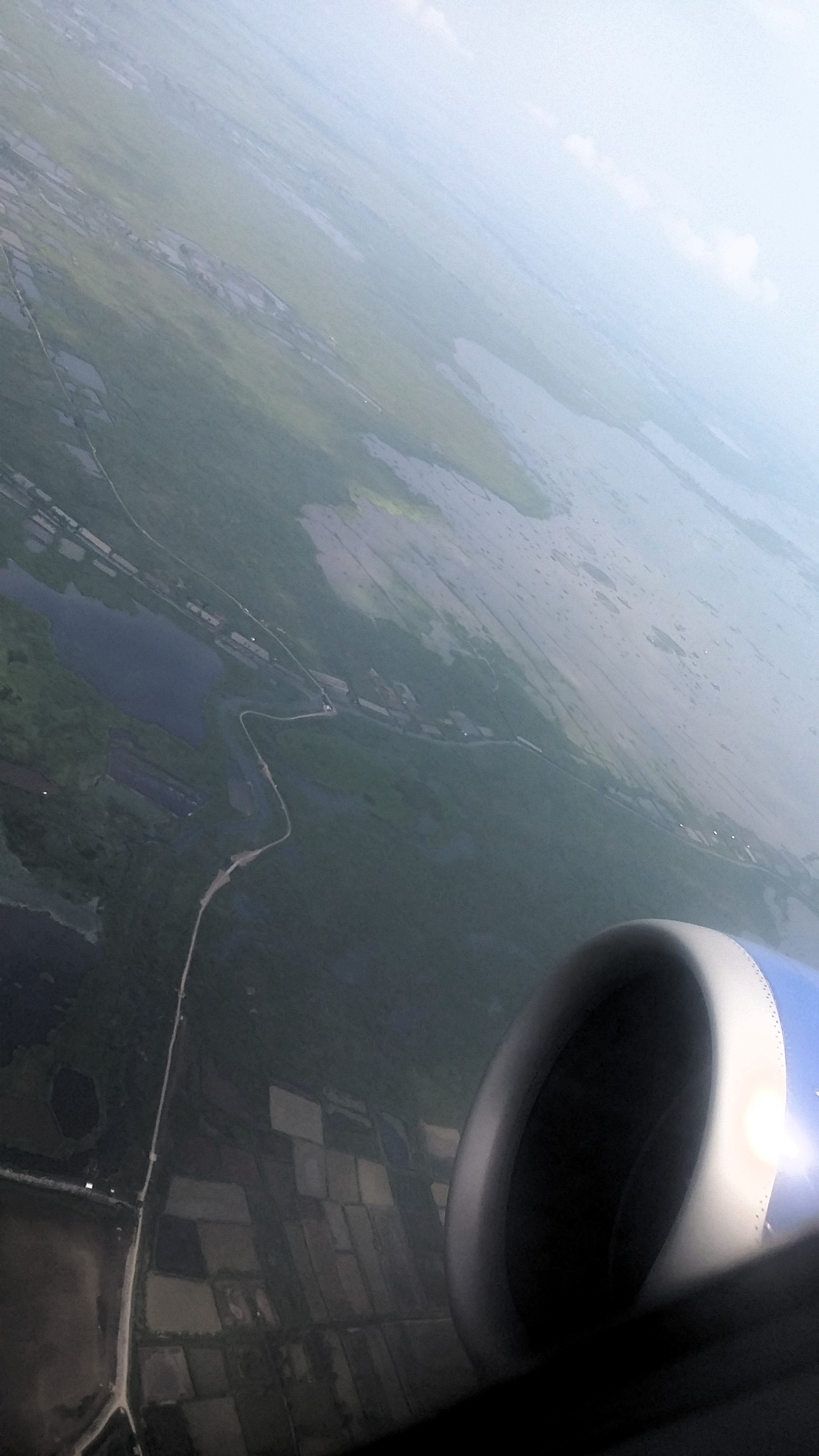
An aerial view of Toubul Paatmang on 28 May 2018

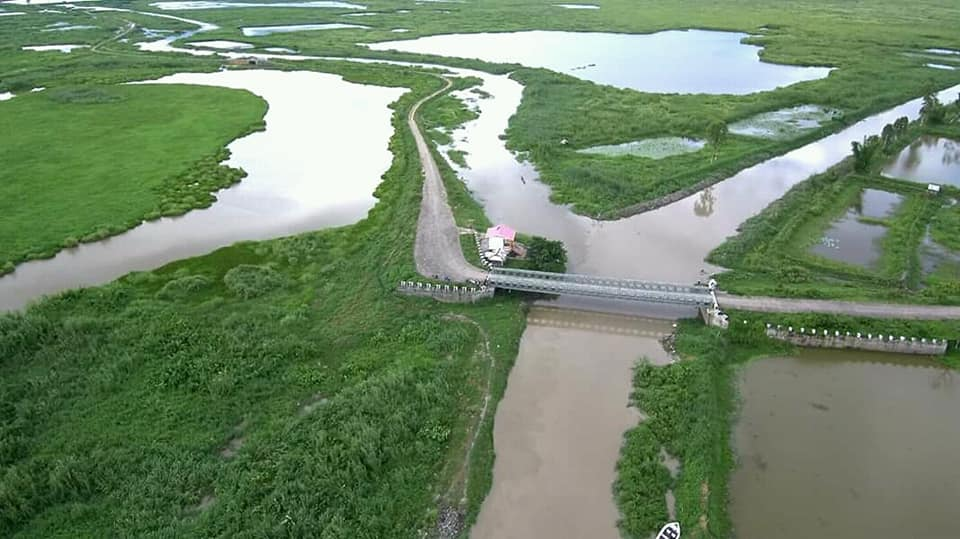
Aerial view of Yangoi-Karong at Toubul
