= Pureiromba =

Meitei Giver God of rain and agricultural prosperity

Pureiromba (Old Manipuri: Puleilompa)
- Giver of rain and agricultural prosperity
- Member of Umang Lais
- Other names: Pureilomba
- Major cult center: Andro, Imphal East, Manipur
- Gender: Male
- Region: Manipur
- Ethnic group: Meitei
- Festivals: Lai Haraoba
- Offspring: Chinsongba (son)

Pureiromba (also, Pureilomba or Puleilompa) is a God in Meitei mythology and religion. He is the giver of rain and agricultural prosperity. He is one of the major Umang Lai deities. He is the Ancestor God of the Angom clan of the Meitei ethnicity.

== History ==
According to the Thalon text, Pureiromba (Meitei: ꯄꯨꯔꯩꯔꯣꯝꯕ or ꯄꯨꯔꯩꯂꯣꯝꯕ, Pureilomba) was one of the five gods of five different places in the Nongmaiching Hills. Before the Meitei King Ura Konthouba (c. 7th century CE) killed all the Selloi Langmai people, the cults of these five gods were combined into that of a single God, Langmai Ningthou (lit. King of the Langmais). The personal names became the names of various forms of the God. With this, the tribal society of the Selloi Langmai people became one chiefdom, later known as the Angom.

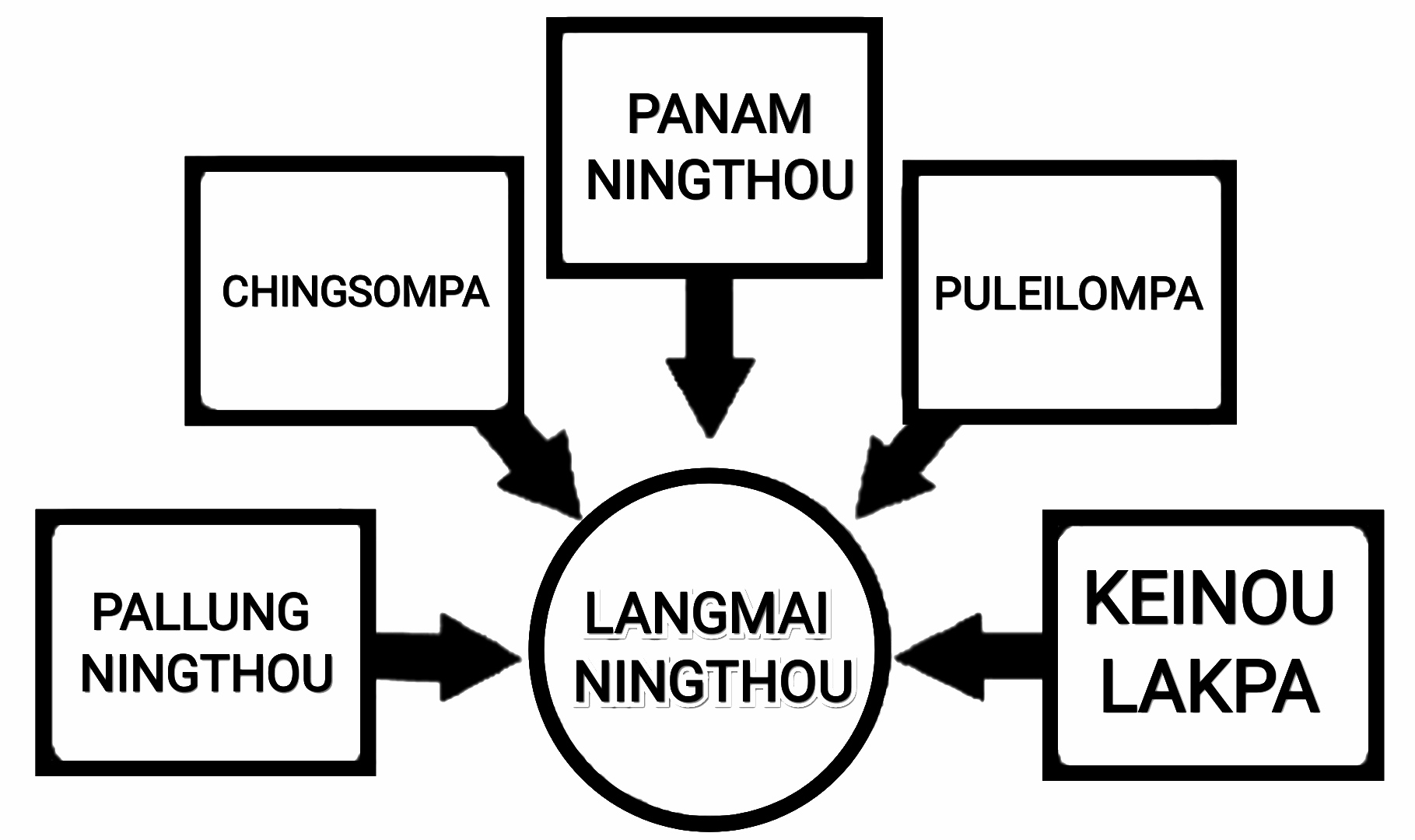
Pureiromba (Old Manipuri: Puleilompa) was one of the 5 gods worshipped in the 5 divisions of the Selloi Langmai hills that gradually merged into one God with the name "Langmai Ningthou" (lit. King of the Langmais).

== Description ==
The people who worship Pureiromba (Old Manipuri: Puleilompa) think of him as their ancestor. However, no one knows if he was a real person from history or a god that acted like a human. But the ancient texts that show his adventures in the human world show him as a strong, powerful and able founding ancestor. He was initially associated with a Loi village of Andro, Imphal East. But in later times, the people of Moirang worshipped him as one of their deified ancestors.

== Festival ==
The religious festival of Lai Haraoba is celebrated in honor of God Pureiromba (Old Manipuri: Puleilompa) in the months of Kalen (April–May). The Haraoba of Pureiromba belongs to the type of the Chakpa Haraoba. Chakpa Haraoba is one of the four types of Lai Haraoba. At Andro, Imphal East, on the last day of the celebration of Pureiromba, a small mound of rice offerings is piled up by the maibis. Out of rice, the maibis construct a small landscape of mountain ranges, ravines, lakes, rivers, etc.

== Cults and pantheons ==
There are pantheons dedicated to God Pureiromba and his son Chinsongba in the village of Andro, Imphal East in Manipur. God Pureiromba is also regarded as the ancestor of the people of the Sharumbam clan of Meitei ethnicity. The cult of Pureiromba was looked after by the people of Mangsatabam clan of Meitei ethnicity.

== Namesakes ==
=== Pureiromba Youth Club ===
The Pureiromba Youth Club, Bamon Kampu, Imphal is a youths' club of Manipur. It reported to the Government of Manipur about the case of Thangjam Manorama.

== See also ==
- Panam Ningthou
