= Koiren Leima =

Twin goddesses in Meitei mythology

Koiren Leima or Leinung Yuchakha Chanu or Ayangleima is the name of the consort of Thangjing, the presiding deity of Ancient Moirang, a province in Ancient Manipur. There are two goddesses, Ayangleima Ahal and Ayangleima Atonpi, who are the first and the second wives of the god respectively. Their accounts are mentioned in the Moirang Ningthourol Lambuba, the royal chronicle of Ancient Moirang.
