= Mount Koubru =

Sacred Mountain in Manipur, India

Highest point
- Elevation: 6,993 ft (2,131 m)
- Coordinates: 25°03′47″N 93°52′18″E

Geography
- Location: Manipur
- Country: India

Mount Koubru also known as Mount Koupalu is one of the highest mountains in Manipur, India and the abode of the god Lainingthou Koubru and the goddess Kounu in Manipuri mythology. Saparmeina town lies below the peak. It is located in the Kangpokpi district of Manipur and is one of the most visited pilgrimage sites in Manipur.

The mountain is noted for mountain hiking as well as mountain climbing.

== Mythological connection ==
Mount Koubru has served as an abode of the god Lainingthou Koubru and goddess Kounu since ancient times in Manipuri mythology, Manipuri literature and Manipuri culture. Mount Koubru is a main dwelling place of Lord Lainingthou Koubru, the protector deity of the northern Kanglei world. The God Lainingthou Koubru lives with his consort Goddess Kounu and their sacred animal Shamu Laishaa Angouba, the White Elephant. The Liangmai people were the first settlers on Koubru Mountain. According to historical chronology, the Liangmais settled on the Koubru Range after the Zeliangrong exodus from Makuiluangdi village. Based on oral tradition, Lord Koubru had taken a maiden named Wimaranliu Abonmai, daughter of Charangambou Abonmai from Makhan village, as his wife. Hence, the Makhan villagers used to appeal for blessings from Wimaranliu, who had turned herself into a deity.

=== Cosmological relation ===
The mythology of ancient Meitei concerns study of cosmology as well as human body. Mount Koubru is considered the head of the body. Many letters of ancient Meetei Mayek including the letter ꯅ("ear" read as na) still exist atop this mountain. According to people of Manipur, the letters of Meetei Mayek also has its significance in cosmological belief that body of a warrior of Thang ta is remained protected by the letters in which Koubru protect the right side (ꯑ).

== Culture ==
Mount Koubru is considered as one of the primary pilgrimage sites by the Meitei people; the stone-formations at the peak are believed to be parts of a single human face, resembling the 27 alphabets of Meitei language.

== See also ==
- Loktak Lake
- Thangjing Hill
