= Kounu =

Ancient Meitei goddess

- Weather Goddess and Guardian Goddess of North
- Member of Maikei Ngaakpa Lais
- Major cult center: Mount Kounu and Mount Koubru
- Abodes: Mount Kounu and Mount Koubru
- Gender: Female
- Region: Manipur
- Ethnic group: Meitei ethnicity
- Festivals: Lai Haraoba

Genealogy
- Consort: Koupalu
- Children: Loyalakpa, Thoudu Nungthel Leima

Kounu is a goddess in Meitei mythology and Sanamahism, the indigenous religion of Manipur. She is a consort of the god Koupalu. She is the guardian of the northern direction. Kounu has two homes. Her main home is on Mount Kounu. Her other home is in Mount Koubru, which is where her husband Koupalu (Koubru) lives. She is worshipped with Koubru as the deities of the Khullakpa (village chief). Kounu and Koubru ruled ancient Manipur for a very long time after the reign of King Ningthou Puthiba.

She dwells in the snows of the far north and she is also known as Kongthem.

== Description ==
Kounu is one of the deities who change climate and weather. Her husband Koupalu and her son Loyalakpa are also weather deities. Meitei people believe that if the annual rainfall is good, then it is caused by goddess Kounu. When goddess Kounu changes the climate, there will be hardly any flood. Crop yields are good in Kounu's activities.

== Mythology ==
=== Love and marriage proposal ===
Kounu met Koupalu for the first time when she was searching for cotton plants in the western slopes of Mount Koubru. The two fell in love at first sight. Kounu asked Koupalu to bring her all kinds of fruit for the marriage proposal. She said she would not agree to marry him if he failed to do so. So, on a Saturday, Koupalu had a meeting with all the gods and goddesses of hills and plains. They all prepared for fruits of all sorts. They planned to proceed to the marriage proposal on the next day, Sunday.

On the next day's before sunrise, goddesses brought the fruits to Kounu's place. Male gods also came with Koupalu to the place. The gods found two fruits missing, heikru (Indian gooseberry and heining. Then, Kounu rejected the marriage proposal. At this, Koupalu told her that she would have a daughter because she had gotten pregnant the last time they had met. Then the other male gods got angry because of Kounu's excessively reserved marriage proposal conditions while she was already conceived. They put a curse on Kounu's baby, saying she would be born on a stone slab on the baby's next incarnation. The goddesses were about to curse the baby to be turned into flower during birth, but they didn't as Kounu had been punished enough. Feeling embarrassed, Kounu also cursed that all the gifts to be turned into stones on the very sunrise. Soon, as the sun rose up, all the gifts turned into stones.

=== Birth of Leisna ===
Kounu gave birth to a daughter named Leisna. When her daughter grew up, she asked Kounu about her father and Kounu told her. Leisna asked to go to her father's place to meet him. Kounu let her go. On her way, Leisna met Pakhangba. They became lovers, and later, they married. Since Leisna was a mortal, she died when her time of death came.

=== Adoption of Thoudu Nungthel Leima - Cursed baby's next incarnation ===
Kounu and Koupalu lived together. Once Leimarel Sidabi decided to incarnate herself as the daughter of the two. So, Leimarel incarnated herself into a baby infant girl. On the very day, Kounu and Koupalu were walking on a hilly region. Koubru got very thirsty. He found Kounu's pitcher empty. Unable to bear his thirst, he went down the riverside to drink water. Surprisingly, he found a newly born girl lying on a stone slab of the river bed. Koupalu shouted three times if there was anyone for the baby girl. No one responded. So, Koupalu and Kounu brought the girl to their abode. The two adopted the girl as their own daughter. They gave her three names. The baby was named Ipok Leima because she was found in the stream. The baby was also named Thoudu Nungthel Leima because she was found lying on the stone slab. The baby was given her final name as Taipang Nganpi, because she was beautiful as well as bright.

Kounu's son Loyalakpa was suspicious, and asked his mother whether Thoudu Nungthel Leima his real sister or not. Koupalu had already warned Kounu not to reveal the secret adoption to their son, so, at first, Kounu lied to him. But Loyalakpa was insistent, and eventually Kounu revealed the truth. Later, Loyalakpa and Kounu's adopted daughter Thoudu Nungthel Leima married.

== Cults and shrines ==
Kounu and her husband Koupalu are worshipped in many shrines of which they are regarded as the protectors. In the village of Senjan Chirang in Manipur, there is a pantheon of the goddess as Laishang.
