= Nungthel Leima =

Goddess in Meitei mythology and religion

- first villager
- Member of Lairembis
- Other names: Thoudu Nungthel Leima; Erok Leima Taibang Ngambi; Taibang Nganbi
- Affiliation: Meitei mythology (Manipuri mythology) and Meitei religion (Sanamahism)
- Texts: Puyas
- Gender: Female
- Region: Manipur)
- Ethnic group: Meitei
- Festivals: Lai Haraoba

Genealogy
- Parents: Koubru (foster) (father); Kounu (foster) (mother)
- Consort: Loyalakpa

Nungthel Leima is a goddess in Meitei mythology and religion. She is an adopted daughter of the God Koubru and Goddess Kounu. She is a wife of the God Loyalakpa. She is regarded as the deity of the Khunjahanba. She is one of the incarnations of Leimarel Sidabi.

== Description ==
The name Thoudu Nungthel Leima (Meitei: ꯊꯧꯗꯨ ꯅꯨꯡꯊꯦꯜ ꯂꯩ, IPA: /tʰəu.du núŋ.tʰel lə́i.ma/) or Thoudu Nungthen Leima (ꯊꯧꯗꯨ ꯅꯨꯡꯊꯦꯟ ꯂꯩꯃ, /tʰəu.du núŋ.tʰen lə́i.ma/) is described as the deity of the first citizen (Meitei: ꯈꯨꯟꯖꯥ ꯑꯍꯥꯟꯕ, romanized: Khunjahanba, lit. 'first villager').

The Goddess Leimarel Sidabi incarnated herself as a little girl and laid herself on a stone slab in the riverbed. On the same day, God Koubru and Goddess Kounu were walking nearby. Koubru got very thirsty, so he went down the riverside to drink water. He found the girl on the river bed. Koubru shouted three times asking if there was anyone for the baby girl. Since no one responded, Koubru and Kounu took the girl to their divine home. The girl was adopted as their own daughter. She was given three names. She was called Ipok Leima because she was found in the stream. She was also named Thoudu Nungthel Leima because she was found lying on a stone slab. And, her final name was Taipang Nganpi because she was beautiful as well as bright.

=== Husband and suitor ===
Nungthel Leima is married to God Loyalakpa. However, she was once admired by God Khoriphaba. Once Khoriphaba was offered a chance by God Koubru to choose any lady of his own desire from the latter's place. Unfortunately, Goddess Nungthel Leima was chosen by Khoriphaba. But since Nungthel Leima was already married, God Koubru could not give Khoriphaba the chosen lady. Koubru did not want to take back his own words. So, he asked Khoriphaba to choose a lady once again but he should do it blindfolded. Blindfolded Khoiriphaba tried to choose but could not get Goddess Nungthel Leima. This event is enacted by the maibis in the Lai Haraoba festival till present times.

== Festival ==
The sacred Lai Haraoba festival is annually celebrated in honor of goddess Thoudu Nungthel Leima, besides other deities.

== Cults and pantheons ==
On 19 January 2018, a newly constructed temple of Ema Nungthel Leima was inaugurated at Top Siphai by Oinam Lukhoi, the then MLA of Wangoi Assembly Constituency. During the inaugural event, Oinam Lukhoi announced on the proposals to Manipur State Government to re-develop the existing sacred temples in the Wangoi AC, including other temples of goddess Nungthel Leima.

== In popular culture ==
Nungthel Leima Tollomkhombada Thajaba is a book written by Naoroibam Khamba. It was released on 17 January 2021.
