= Koupalu =

Meitei guardian god of the north-west direction

Koubru
- Founder of Meitei civilization, guardian of the north-west direction.
- Member of Meitei guardians of the directions, Umang Lais
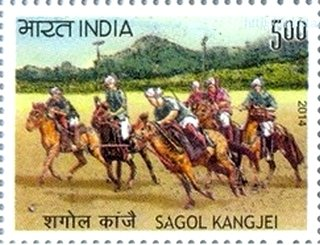
- God Koubru is one of the 14 players of polo (Sagol Kangjei) in Meitei mythology
- Affiliation: Sanamahism
- Abode: Mount Koubru
- Weapon: Spear
- Animals: White elephant
- Mount: White elephant
- Gender: Male
- Ethnic group: Meitei
- Festivals: Lai Haraoba

Genealogy
- Consort: Kounu, Likla Leima, Koujeng Leima
- Children: Loyalakpa; Thoudu Nungthel Leima; Lainaotabi

Koupalu is a primordial deity in Sanamahism. He is the protector of the Meiteis, guardian of the North West direction and the founder of Meitei civilization. He lives on the summit of Mount Koubru.

== Description ==
Koupalu (or Koubru) is a primordial deity in Sanamahism, the indigenous religion of Manipur. He is the omniscient and omnipotent guardian god of the Meiteis and the guardian of the north-west direction. According to legend, he is the progenitor of the civilization of Kangleipak, which he founded at Mount Koubru, near modern Imphal in north-western Manipur, where he resides. He is said to be the controller of nine underground wells or tunnels which are associated with the birth and death of mankind. The tunnels are considered sacred and are, themselves, worshipped by Meiteis.

== Worship ==
The traditional hymns emphasise Koubru's role as the creator of Meitei civilisation. For example, this hymn of invocation:

Koubru of the North,
you are the overlord.
You are the first place of settlement.

In the Lai Haraoba festival, a ritualistic folk song dedicated to God Koubru is sung:

Koubru the checker of the North
The place of the first settlement of the Leima-Lai
You let the Charik bloom
You nurture the Nongthrei sprout
Your power is omnipotent
You are the one that illuminates the race.

The Meiteis offer a beautiful puppy to Koubru to free themselves from suffering. The Loi people worship God Koubru on every occasion, including birth, marriage and death. All the Loi villagers excluding Andro are the worshipers of God Koubru.

== See also ==
- Marjing – north east protector
- Thangjing – south west protector
- Wangbren – south east protector
