= Marjing =

Meitei God of polo, horses and warfare

- God of polo, hockey, horse, sports and war
- Member of Divine polo players
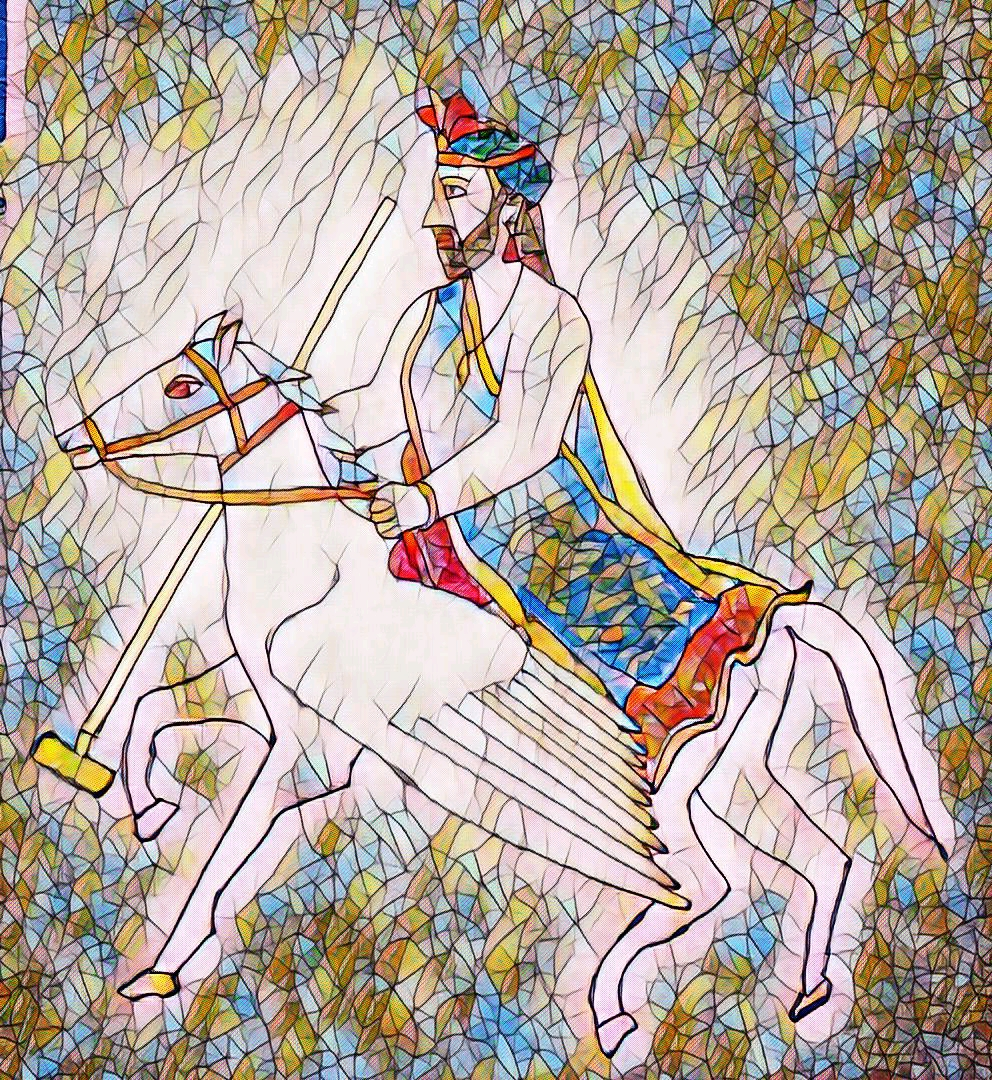
- God Marjing riding on Samaton, the winged horse
- Other names: Marching, Ibudhou Marjing, Ebudhou Marjing, Iputhou Marjing, Eputhou Marjing
- Affiliation: Sanamahism
- Major cult center: Marjing Hills
- Abode: Marjing Hills
- Weapon: Kangjei (Polo mallet)
- Animals: Meitei horse
- Mount: Samadon Ayangba
- Texts: Kangjeirol, Leikharol
- Gender: Male
- Region: Manipur
- Ethnic group: Meitei
- Festivals: Lai Haraoba

Genealogy
- Consort: Humu Leima
- Offspring: Loyalakpa
- Dynasty: Salai Leishangthem

Equivalents
- Greek: Ares
- Hindu: Kartikeya
- Roman: Mars
- Slavic: Perun
- Norse: Odin

Marjing (Meitei: ꯃꯥꯔꯖꯤꯡ) is the God of horses, polo, hockey, sports and war in Sanamahism, the indigenous religion of Manipur. The guardianship of the north eastern direction is alluded to Marjing and the other directions to Koupalu (north west), Thangching (south west) and Wangpulen (south east). According to the legend, he invented the game of polo (Sagol Kangjei) and introduced it as the national game. He and his divine creature, Samadon Ayangba, reside in the top of the Heingang Ching (Marjing hills).

== Origin ==
According to the Leithak Leikharol PuYa, God Marjing (mentioned as "Maraching") originated from the intestines of Atiya Sidaba. He was created to control Samadon Ayangba, the divine horse (Old Manipuri: Sakon). The horse was created from the foot of Ashiba (Sanamahi).

== Description ==
God Marjing is one of the five gods who enter into the human body and position themselves as one of the souls. Marjing dwells in the heart of human body. The God is also associated with Sagol Kangjei (Polo), the main sports of the Meitei people. Parratt says "His main importance in Meitei mythology is that he is credited with the invention of polo, the national game."

== Mythology ==
Sagol Kangjei (English: Polo) is originally the game of gods. There are 7 players on each side. They used Kangdrum (a ball made from bamboo root). This is what the human beings imitate from them. The first divine polo match was played during the festival of Lai Haraoba.

== Worship ==
During the Lai Haraoba festival, a maibi (priestess) performs a ritual in the form of a mime. She holds a mallet in her hand and enacts the game of polo.

Every year, in the top of the Heingang Hills, devotees offer polostick (Old Manipuri: ꯀꯥꯡꯆꯩ, romanized: kangchei, Meitei: ꯀꯥꯡꯖꯩ, romanized: kangjei) and bamboo-root-ball (Meitei: ꯀꯥꯡꯗ꯭ꯔꯨꯝ, romanized: kangdrum) to God Marjing. This is done even when any animal in one's house become sick.

In 1618 AD, during the reign of King Khagemba, a public worship took place at his abode and also at every watery place on the river side. Wild boars, ducks, cocks, hen, pigeons and other creatures were offered to God Marjing. This was recorded in the Cheitharol Kumbaba.
