= Thangching =

Primordial deity in Sanamahism

- Progenitor of the Kege clan Protector of all animals (Note: for both domestic and wild animals, in accordance to the Moirang Ningthourol Lambuba); Lord of Mahui tribe Divine Ningthou of the Koiren people (Note: mentioned in religious context as "Koiren" instead of "Koireng")
- Member of Lainingthous, Maikei Ngaakpa Lais and Umang Lais
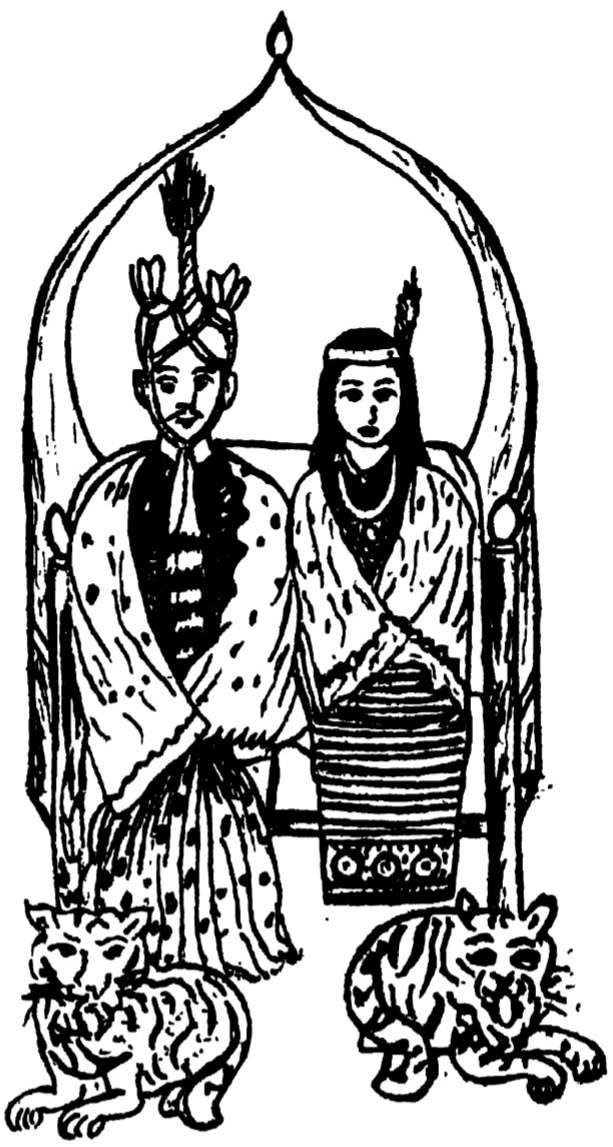
- Thangching, the Patron God of Moirang and his consort, Koiren Leima.
- Other names: Thangjing; Koylellai; Koiren Lai (Note: The terms, "Koiren", "Koirel", and "Koren" are used to refer to the tribe Koireng, in Meitei religious context, to refer to the deity.); Koirel Lai; Koren Lai
- Affiliation: Sanamahism
- Major cult center: Moirang
- Abodes: Heaven and Earth
- Weapon: Polo stick
- Animals: White tiger and horse
- Mount: White tiger and horse
- Texts: Moirang Ningthourol Lambuba
- Gender: male
- Region: Moirang
- Ethnic group: Meitei, Koireng
- Festivals: Lai Haraoba
- Parents: Nongshaba (Nongsaba)
- Consorts: Koiren Leima

Thangching or Thangjing is a primordial deity in Sanamahism, the traditional religion of Manipur. He is the ruling deity of the Moirang dynasty. He rules supreme on the banks of the landlocked sea, Loktak lake. He is one of the four cardinal Umang Lais. The guardianship of the south western direction is attributed to Thangjing and the other directions to Koubru (north west), Marjing (north east) and Wangbren (south east).

Two of his most prominent pantheons are the Thangching Temple and the Thangching Hill (Thangjing Peak).

== Origin ==
Thangjing is a deity of pre-Hindu origin. The Moirang Ningthourol Lambuba mentioned that Moirang was the amalgamation of different groups of people with different traditional beliefs. During the reign of King Fang Fang Ponglenhanpa (52 BC- 28 AD), all the diversities were merged into one with God Thangjing as the central figure.

The deity was also notably worshipped by the Koireng people, due to which the deity was given epithets, like "Koiren Lai" or "Koirel Lai", and with this fact, some people believed that His cult might have been started from the community.

When the cult of Thangjing was merged into the Umang Laism, the folk deities associated with God Thangjing began to be identified with other Umang Lais. One example is that of goddess Ayang Leima Ahal and goddess Ayang Leima Atonpi. These two goddesses were originally associated with fertility and agriculture. This fact is evident in the ritualistic songs praising them. Later, these two female deities were identified as the consorts of God Thangjing.

When Thangjing was identified as an Umang Lai, the identity of the two goddesses was associated with that of goddess Panthoibi. Thus, the new identity of Goddess Ayang Leima Panthoibi was formed.

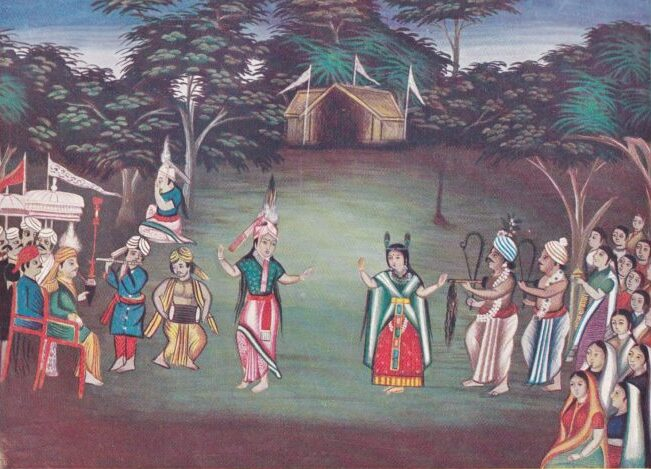
Khuman Khamba and Moirang Thoibi performing a dance before the Thangjing Temple

== Description ==
Thangjing is described as the Lord of the tiger hunters. The Moirang Ningthourol Lambuba describes God Thangjing as the Divine Chief of Koireng people, the Progenitor of Kege Clan, the Protector of all the domestic as well as wild animals and the Lord of Mahui tribe.

The history of Moirang is always associated with the godly powers of Thangjing. Thangjing is a living God to the people of Ancient Moirang. The epic legend of the Khamba Thoibi is always related to God Thangjing. The ancient temple dedicated to Thangjing still stands on the banks of Loktak lake in the present day Moirang.

== Mythology ==
In the legendary epic Khamba Thoibi, Lord Thangjing always stands for righteousness and as a saviour of Khamba.

Thangjing sent Phouoibi to Kege Moirang (Keke Moilang) to prosper the human world.

When goddess Panthoibi was searching for her beloved Nongpok Ningthou, she asked God Thangjing and God Wangbren about the whereabouts of Nongpok Ningthou. To Thangjing, she said:

O! Thangjing, Supreme God of Moirang, Loktak is your mirror, My beloved Nongpok has gone like a wind, Like a cattle looking for its herd, I am looking for my beloved. Please tell me Does he come to your country?

== Worship ==
Thangching had been worshipped since ancient times. Still today, there is an ancient shrine at Moirang. An annual ritual festival known as Lai Haraoba is held early in summer in honor of the God. During the annual Thangjing Lai Haraoba festival, traditional dances and sports are performed as rituals. The performers follow the ancient customs of wearing the traditional attires of the royal lords and ladies. The festival is celebrated during the Meitei lunar month of Kalen. It continues for a week. Meiteis from all over Manipur visit the Thangjing Temple in Moirang.

== Namesakes ==
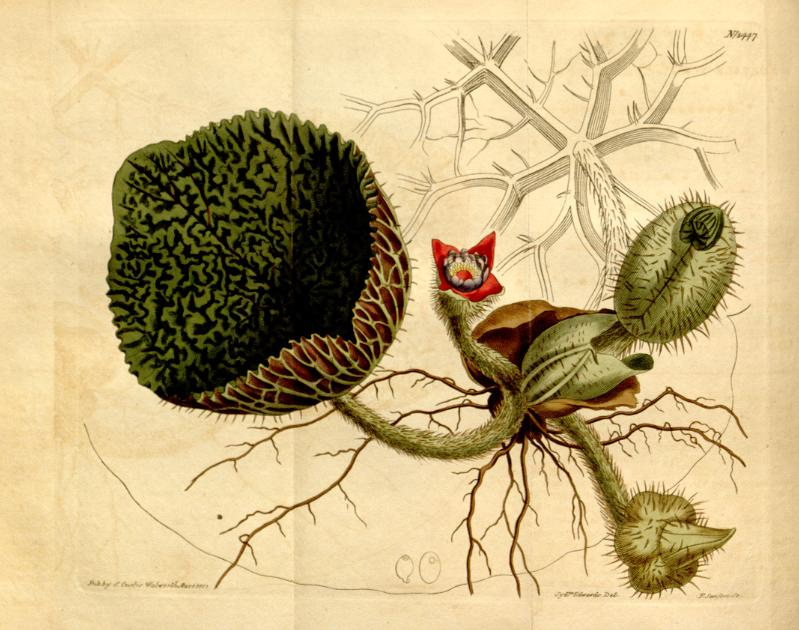
Thangjing plant (Euryale ferox)

The Thangjing plant (Euryale ferox) is an aquatic plant that bears edible seeds. Its seeds are called "foxnuts" and are one of the most popular food items in Meitei cuisine of Manipur.

The Thangching Peak (Thangjing Hill) is one of the four peaks, the others being the Koubru (after God Koubru), the Kounu (after Goddess Kounu) and the Loyalakpa (after God Loyalakpa). These peaks are the holy places of worship of the Meitei ethnicity. Their names are derived from the names of the deities whom the Meiteis worship at the peaks.

== See also ==
- Koupalu (Koubru) - north west protector
- Marjing - north east protector
- Wangbren - south east protector
