= Moirang =

Moirang Keke Moilang, Kege Moirang
- town
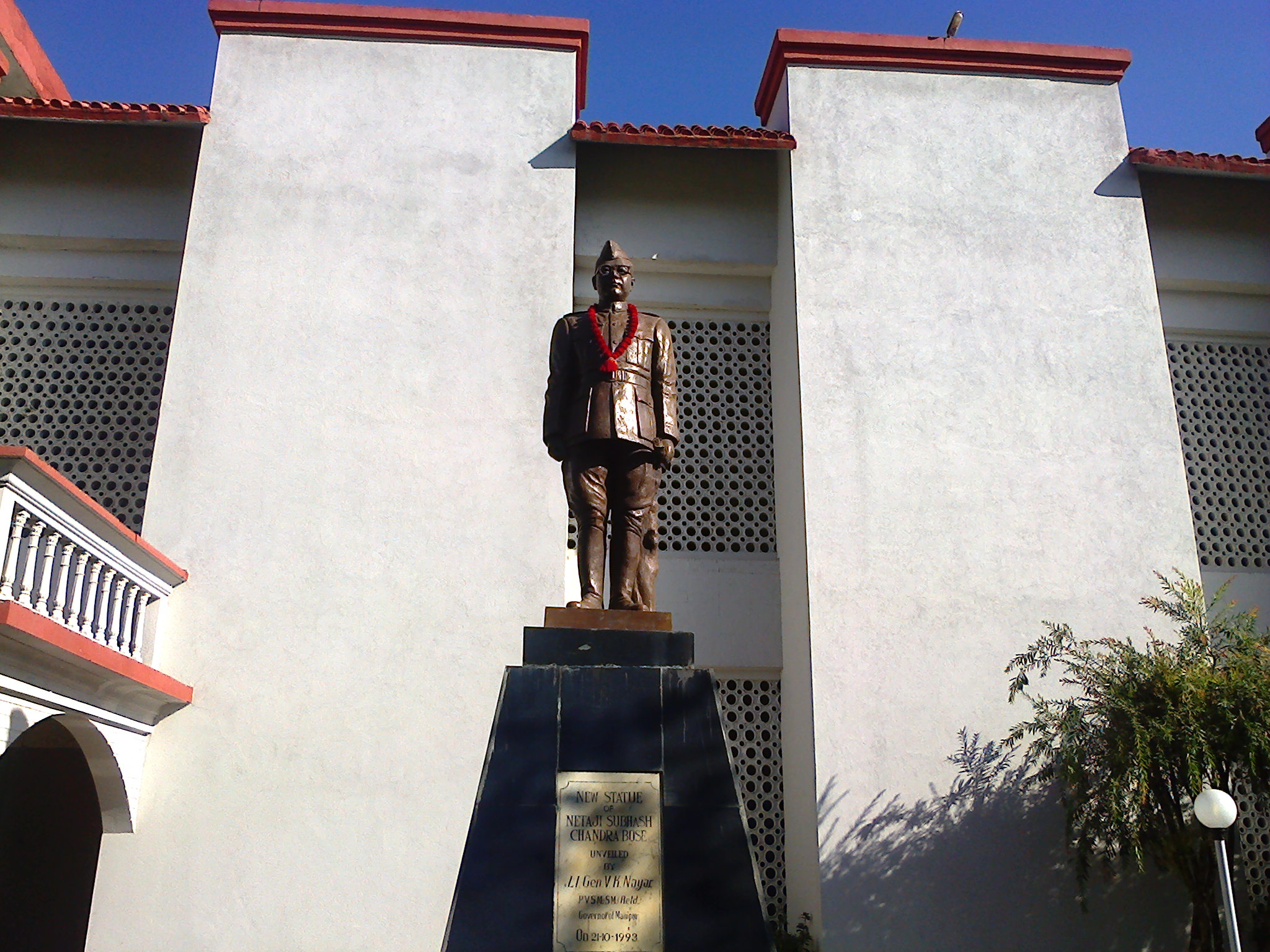
- A statue of Netaji Subhashchandra Bose in the INA Memorial Complex in Moirang

- Location within Manipur Location within India
- Coordinates: 24.5°N 93.77°E
- Country: India
- State: Manipur
- District: Bishnupur
- Elevation: 766 m (2,513 ft)

Population (2001)
  - Total: 16,684

Language(s)
  - Official: Meitei (Manipuri)
- Time zone: UTC+5:30 (IST)
- Vehicle registration: MN
- Website: manipur.gov.in

Moirang (Meitei: /moi.rāŋ/) is a town in the Indian state of Manipur, best known for the tentatively listed UNESCO World Heritage Sites of the Keibul Lamjao Conservation Area (KLCA), covering Keibul Lamjao National Park (KLNP), the world's only floating national park, the buffer of Loktak Lake (140 sq km) and Pumlen Pat (43 sq. km). It is best known for the being the place of origin of the ancient epic legend of Khamba and Thoibi, one of the seven epic cycles of incarnations of Meitei mythology and folklore. Nationwide, it is also famous for the INA War Museum in the INA Martyrs' Memorial Complex, where Colonel Shaukat Malik of the Indian National Army hoisted the Tricolour for the first time on Indian soil on 14 April 1944. It is situated approximately 45 km (28 mi) south of the state capital Imphal. It has an area of 269 km^{2} (104 sq mi) with a population of 62,187 in 67 villages. There are 12 Panchayats in this block.

== History ==
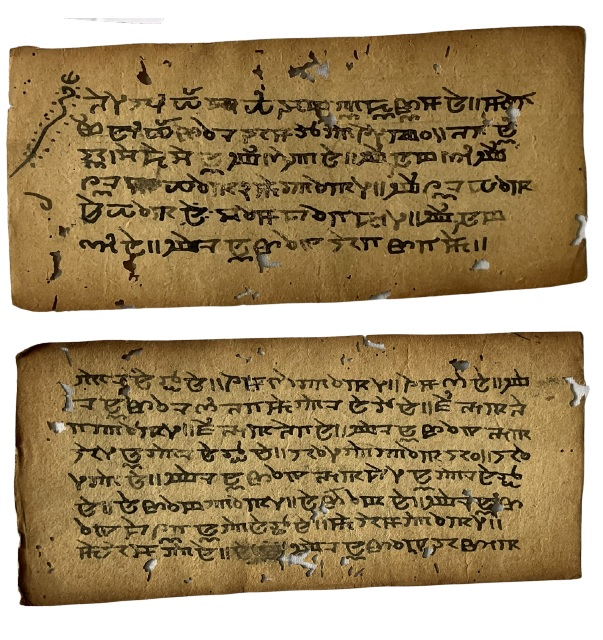
Moirang Ningthourol Yimtapa (alias Moilang Ningthoulol Yimtapa), an Ancient Meitei language manuscript text, in traditional Meetei Mayek script, about the kings of the Moirang kingdom

=== Epic cycles of incarnations and the Khamba Thoibi ===
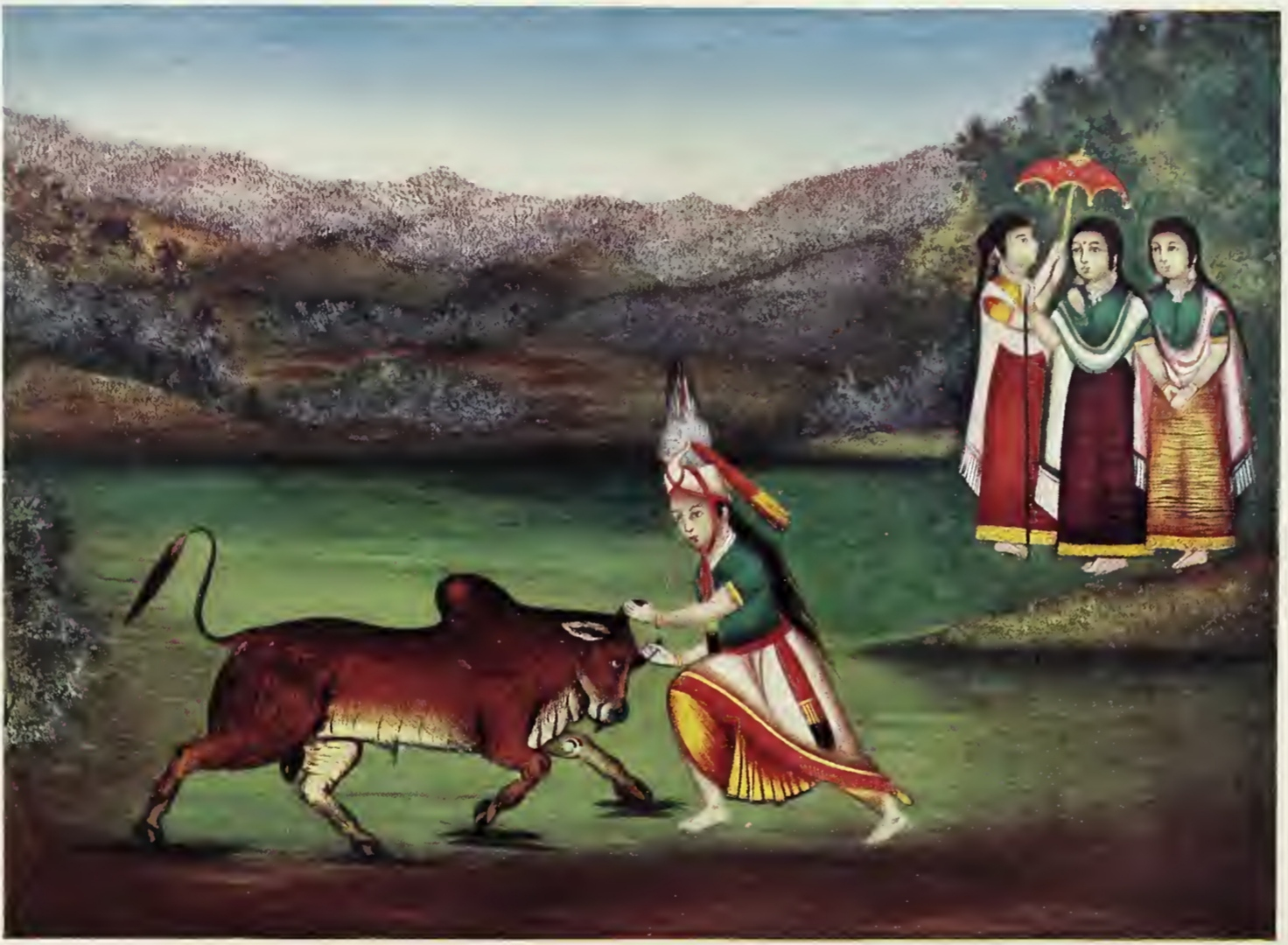
The capture of the wild Kao (bull) by Khamba

Historically, the town of Moirang is famous for the ancient temple of the deity Thangching (Thangjing) and the legendary love story of "Khamba Thoibi". In a village named Ngangkhaleikai, the old cloth used by Khamba and Nongban is still preserved. The epic story of "Khamba-Thoibi" begins between a beautiful princess name Thoibi, daughter of Wangon Ningthou Chingkhu Naha Telheiba, and an orphan man named Khuman Khamba. Khamba was raised by her sister after both their parents died when they were very young. Khamnu used to go around the village to pound grain and lend a hand to others' household work at her young age. In return, she fed her brother from the lesser amount of grain that others paid in gratitude for helping with their household work.

=== Powerful clan ===
In ancient times, the king of Moirang was considered as the most powerful among the seven clan kings of Manipur. Till the end of Khamba-Thoibi era the Burmese King paid the annual war reparations money to the Moirang king.

=== World War II and the INA ===
During World War II, Moirang was the headquarters of Indian National Army (INA). Colonel Shaukat Malik of the Indian National Army hoisted the Tricolour for the first time on Indian soil on 14 April 1944, in Moirang with the help of Manipuris like Shri Mairembam Koireng Singh and others who were members of the INA. The INA Museum at Moirang displays some wartime relics and photographs. Netaji Subhas Chandra Bose, himself also hoisted the Tricolour flag of Indian Independence on 30 December 1943 in Jimkhana Club Port Blair. In which time Netaji Subhas Chandra Bose was commander in chief of INA and Hon. President of Indian Government which recognized by 18 countries.

== Culture ==
The month long Lai Haraoba festival held between mid-May to June originated from Moirang. The graceful Khamba Thoibi dance also originated here at Moirang.

== Geography ==
Moirang is located at 24.5°N 93.77°E. It has an average elevation of 766 metres (2513 feet).

== Tourist places ==
- Ibudhou Thangjing Temple: It is an ancient temple of Moirang, dedicated to Lord Thangjing. Lai Haraoba festival is found at its greatest pace here.
- Indian National Army (INA) complex: Apart from being an ancient suzerainty, Moirang today, is all the more akin to India's political history. It was on 14 April 1944 that the flag of the Indian National Army (INA) was for the second time hoisted on the Indian Soil of Moirang (first time tri colour flag for Indian Independence hoisted by himself Netaji Subhash Chandra Bose, INA Chief Commander & President of Indian National Government in Port Blair- Shahid Swaraj Dweep on 30 December 1943) about 45 km away from Imphal, the capital of Manipur. The INA Museum at Moirang is a treasure of relics connected with Netaji Subhas Chandra Bose's struggle against British imperialism to emancipate the Indian motherland.
- Loktak lake: The legendary Loktak lake of Manipur is said to be largest fresh water lake in the entire North East. The lake, in fact, has an intrinsic influence on the economy of communities who inhabit the surroundings of the lake by its natural produce like fish and other varieties of vegetables from the greenery around the lake.
- Sendra Island: Sendra, although a small hillock entangled by the lake-water on all sides is linked with the mainland through a pathway. A tourist lodge is put up on the hilltop which is equipped with modern amenities, including a cafeteria.
- Keibul Lamjao National Park: The only floating National Park in the world, on the Loktak Lake is the last natural habitat of the Sangai (Rucervus eldii eldii), the dancing deer of Manipur. A glimpse of the deer in this unique wetland ecosystem is a must for any wildlife enthusiast. Other wildlife to mention a few are: Hog deer, Otter and a host of water fowls and migratory birds can also be sighted during November to March. The forest Department of Manipur maintains watch towers and two rest houses within the park.
- Phubala: This is another locality with a close affinity to Moirang as well as the lake of Loktak, on the bank of which the place is situated. Boating as well as other water relocated sports are being introduced at Phubala. The story of Phubala Hanuba (an oldman of Phubala) is an episode with terrific humour within the trend of the story of Khamba – Thoibi.

== Transport ==
Moirang is well connected with Imphal and Churachandpur through NH-150. Moirang-Kumbi and Moirang-Thanga are the other important district roads connected to Moirang town.

== Demographics ==
As of 2001 India census, Moirang had a population of 16,684. Males constitute 51% of the population and females 49%. Moirang has an average literacy rate of 64%, higher than the national average of 59.5%: male literacy is 71%, and female literacy is 55%. In Moirang, 13% of the population is under six years of age.

Religion in Moirang town (2011)
Religion	Percent
Hinduism	95.22%
Sanamahism	2.97%
Christianity	1.47%
Others	0.34%

== Politics ==
Moirang is part of Inner Manipur (Lok Sabha constituency).
