= Thongngak Lakpa =

Thongngak Lakpa (ꯊꯣꯡꯉꯥꯛ ꯂꯥꯛꯄ) or Thongak Lakapa is a deity mentioned mainly in the classical Meitei mythological narrative epic, Nungpan Ponpi Luwaopa. He is one of the younger brothers of Leinung Thongaren, the god of the dead. He plays an important role in the story’s conflict between mortal love and divine authority, appearing as a warrior sent to punish Luwaopa, who had taken Koubru Namoinu, the god’s former wife, as his own. Thongngak Lakapa is a divine force of vengeance and the rigid enforcement of cosmic order. He is duty-bound to his elder brother and acts as a soldier of the underworld. However, his defeat at the hands of a mortal man shows the power of love and human will when guided by purpose and emotion.

== Divine warrior and mission ==
When Luwaopa, a Luwang dynasty prince, refuses to surrender the soul of Koubru Namoinu (his wife and the former wife of the god), Thongaren sends his younger brother Thongngak Lakapa to confront him. His role is that of an enforcer, carrying out divine justice and reclaiming what the god of death believes is rightfully his.

Thongngak Lakapa is not portrayed as an ordinary fighter. He is equipped with powerful divine weapons, described in highly symbolic and elemental terms, (1) broad fieldstone as his shield, (2) lightning, the inseparable dart of mother earth, as his spear, (3) flaming sword that shines like fire, tucked into his loincloth.

== Confrontation with Luwaopa ==
When Thongngak Lakapa arrives on the field of battle, he exchanges sharp and dramatic words with Nungpan Ponpi Luwaopa. Their dialogue shows strong emotions, accusation, defiance, and divine judgment. Thongngak Lakapa accuses Luwaopa of stealing the wife of the god of death and demands that he release the god currently held captive. Luwaopa responds by threatening to bury the god as part of Namoinu’s funeral rites if her soul is not returned.

Despite his mighty weapons and authority, Thongngak Lakapa is outwitted by Luwaopa, who cleverly proposes bare-handed combat. This tactic avoids facing the god’s elemental weapons, which Luwaopa knows he cannot defeat directly. In the end, Thongngak Lakapa is defeated and held captive by Luwaopa under a heavy stone slab.

== See also ==
- Makpa Louoipa
- Khamnung Kikoi Louonbi
- Laikhurembi
- Thongak Lairembi
- Lainaotabi
- Sunulembi and Chothe Thangwai Pakhangba
- Henjunaha
