= Makpa Louoipa =

Makpa Louoipa (ꯃꯥꯛꯄꯥ ꯂꯧꯑꯣꯏꯄꯥ), also known as Makpa Louoiba (ꯃꯥꯛꯄ ꯂꯧꯑꯣꯏꯕ), is a minor deity in the Meitei mythology, folklore and religion. He is notably mentioned in the classical Meitei literary work of the Nungpan Ponpi Luwaopa. He serves as a divine messenger or courier in the service of Leinung Thongalen (Thongaren), the god of the dead. His divine actions play a key role in the emotional and supernatural turning point of the story, particularly in the scene involving the death of Koubru Namoinu. His role as a messenger of death is important in ancient Meitei beliefs about the connection between dreams, the soul, and the divine. His use of a dream object to remove memory and spirit shows how death is imagined not only as physical but also emotional and spiritual.

== Role ==
Makpa Louoipa appears during the most tragic moment of the narrative. After Namoinu, the beloved wife of Luwapa, has been living happily as a mortal, the god of death, Leinung Thongaren, becomes jealous and sends Makpa Louoipa to carry out a secret task. Louoipa's mission is to retrieve Namoinu's soul and return it to the netherworld.

He does not appear in a physical or violent form but instead enters Namoinu's dream. In the dream, he gives her a magic fruit that erases her memories of her earthly life and loved ones. After the dream, Namoinu awakens feeling weak and ill. Her condition worsens, and although she resists death for the sake of her love, she eventually dies in the arms of Luwaopa.

== Symbolism ==
Makpa Louoipa carries the symbol for the quiet, inescapable reach of death. He uses a subtle and magical method to achieve his goal. His presence shows how death can approach gently but with final effect. He is not portrayed as cruel, but rather as a servant following divine orders. His action brings sorrow but also serves as the necessary event that leads to the dramatic conflict between Luwaopa and the gods, and ultimately, the resurrection of Namoinu.

== See also ==
- Khamnung Kikoi Louonbi
- Laikhurembi
- Thongak Lairembi
- Thongngak Lakpa
- Lainaotabi
- Sunulembi and Chothe Thangwai Pakhangba
- Henjunaha
