= Koubru Namoinu =

Koubru Namoinu, also known as Koupru Namoinu, or Koubarol Namoinu, or Koubaron Namoinu, or Kouparol Namoinu, or Kouparon Namoinu, is a female protagonist of the classical Meitei mythological story of Nungpan Ponpi Luwaopa. Formerly a wife of deity Thongalen, later adopted by Koupalu, she finally married Luwang dynasty prince Nungpan Ponpi Luwaopa, and mothered Luwang Ningthou Punshiba. She is portrayed as divine and tragic, whose story is related to the themes of love, loss, rebirth, and cultural tradition of Meitei folklore, showing the relationship between gods and mortals.

== Divine and earthly life ==
Namoinu was originally the youngest wife of Leinung Thongaren, the god of the dead. During a visit to the human world with her younger brother-in-law, she became separated and was left behind on earth. The King of Koubru, who had no children, found and adopted her as his daughter. Thus, she became known as Koubru Namoinu.

Though she had a divine origin, she lived a peaceful life as a mortal princess in the Koubru kingdom. Her beauty, grace, and kindness made her well-loved, both by her adoptive parents and the people around her.

== Love and marriage ==
One day, Nungpan Ponpi Luwaopa, a prince from the Luwang clan, visited the Koubru kingdom during his search for true love. Upon meeting Namoinu, he instantly fell in love. The feeling was mutual. Luwaopa returned to his parents and asked them to arrange a marriage with Namoinu.

The Koubru king and queen agreed to the proposal, accepting gifts and honoring the marriage as a divine match. The wedding took place with proper ceremony, and Namoinu began a new life with her husband. For a time, they lived happily and harmoniously.

== Death and afterlife conflict ==
Their joy did not last. Her former divine husband, Leinung Thongaren, became jealous and angry that his wife was now living with a mortal man. He sent Makpa Louoipa, a messenger, to retrieve her soul. Namoinu’s health began to fail after receiving a magical fruit in her dream, and she eventually died in the arms of her beloved Luwaopa.

Luwaopa was devastated and refused to perform her funeral rites. He sent a message to the god of death, demanding the return of her soul or challenging him to a duel. In the events that followed, Luwaopa fought and defeated two divine brothers sent by Thongaren. Eventually, the god himself appeared.

== Return to life and reunion ==
Realizing he could not win against the god, Luwaopa humbly begged Thongaren to return Namoinu to life so that their love could continue and the Luwang family line could grow. Touched by the prince’s sincerity, the god agreed.

Namoinu, who had been lying lifeless in the courtyard, was revived. Luwaopa, still cautious and overwhelmed by emotion, asked the god to wait while Namoinu was purified with sacred herbs and water. Only then did he fully believe she had returned to life.

The couple reunited and went on to live another hundred years together. They had a son named Hongnem Luwang Punshipa, continuing the Luwang lineage.

== See also ==
- Sunulembi and Chothe Thangwai Pakhangba
- Henjunaha
- Panthoibi Naheron
- Orpheus and Eurydice
- Hades and Persephone
- Pluto (mythology) and Proserpina
- Izanami and Izanagi
