= Bidhi Nongdamba =

The Bidhi Nongdamba (ꯕꯤꯙꯤ ꯅꯣꯡꯗꯝꯕ, literally, "ordainer of destiny"), also known as Vidhi Nongdamba, is a classical Meitei language literary work. It tells a story associated with Soraren, the sky god, exploring themes of human destiny and divine intervention. The narrative is both amusing and instructive, emphasizing that determinism strongly affects human life, though exceptions occur through the god's benevolence.

== Plot ==
=== Soraren's curiosity ===
The story begins with Soraren observing that no living being could work as diligently as his daughters, who serve him from dawn to dusk. Bidhi Nongdamba, the arbiter of human destiny, responds that humans suffer more than even Soraren's daughters, except for a few who performed pious or charitable deeds in previous lives. Curious, Soraren descends from heaven in human form to observe ordinary life.

=== Life among humans ===
Soraren first meets a woodcutter, who complains that he works hard because of extreme poverty. He then encounters a person carrying a heavy basket of paddy, who gives the same answer. A woman fishing in cold, muddy water explains she must feed her infant daughter, and finally, an old man plowing for a rich master expresses his toil. Soraren helps him, experiencing the harshness of physical work for the first time, with his palms injured.

=== Contrast of wealth ===
Continuing his journey, Soraren observes the palace of a king, made of gold and crystal, where everyone is happy and lively. At sunset, he takes shelter in the hut of a poor old woman preparing for the next day's ritual for her newborn grandchild.

=== Fate of the child ===
At night, Bidhi Nongdamba appears and assigns a lifetime of poverty to the child, despite the prayers for good fortune. Soraren intervenes, requesting a minor modification: the child would be adopted by the king's minister and marry the king's daughter, though the child's life would last only seven days. Following this decree, Liklai Angoupanba, the king's minister, meets the child and his mother, adopts the child, and names him Sana Liklai Lokpa. He grows up handsome and becomes engaged to the king's daughter, Sanalik Sana Khomdon. They marry, but on the fifth day, Lokpa falls ill. Soraren appears in human form and instructs Angoupanba to chant the name of Hari, restoring Lokpa's health instantly. Soraren departs without accepting hospitality.

== Themes and style ==
The story is entertaining and highlights:

- The hard work of ordinary men and women.
- The contrast between wealth and poverty.
- The benevolence and nobility of Soraren.
- The humorous depiction of Bidhi Nongdamba busy assigning fates to children.

The story portrays real-life experiences, grief, and joy, though certain events—such as the minister's impulsive adoption—are less credible. Soraren's divine intervention reflects a Vaisnavic perspective, influencing the outcome of human destiny.

== Language and composition ==
The anonymous author adapted the story from a foreign source. Unlike contemporaneous works, the text avoids extensive use of Sanskrit and Bengali vocabulary, using traditional Meitei names for characters. However, some Indo-Aryan terms, such as Yagya, Bidhi/Vidhi, Bidhata/Vidhata, and Indra, are present, indicating influence from Indo-Aryan literature.

== Editions ==
- Bidhi Nongdamba by Indranmani, Naoroibam (1995)
- Bidhi Nongdamba by Singh, Khomendra Mayanglangbam (1977)

== See also ==
- Chahui Leirong Pampa
- Chothe Thangwai Pakhangba
- Konthoujam Tampha Lairembi
- Nungpan Ponpi Luwaopa
