= Aalong =

First king and founder of Khuman dynasty

Aarong
- Founder of the Khuman dynasty
- Monarchy: est. 174–220 CE
- Successor: Tumaba
- Spouse: Chinphuren Leitanglen Chinkhubi
- Issue: Tumaba
Names
- Aarong Khuman Ningthou
- Dynasty: Khuman dynasty
- Father: Singtangpung Tapung Singminnapa
- Mother: Shanthong Punemba Chanu
- Religion: Sanamahism

Aalong (Modern Meitei: ꯑꯥꯔꯣꯡ, romanized: Aarong) was the first king and the founder of the independent Khuman dynasty. He ruled from 174 CE to 220 CE.

He was the elder brother of King Pamingnaba, the first king and founder of the Luwang dynasty. They both were the sons of King Singdangbung Tabung Singminnaba; and the grandsons of Poireiton.

He was the contemporary of Meitei King Khuyoi Tompok.

== Early life and lineage ==
Aalong belonged to the Khuman–Luwang ancestral lineage, which traces its origin to Poireiton, a cultural hero in Meitei mythology and also the eighth king of undivided Khuman-Luwang undivided lineage.

The Khuman-Luwang common lineage had nine rulers, in which Singdangbung Tabung Singminnaba was its last ruler. His two sons—Aarong and Pamingnaba—split the lineage into Khuman dynasty and Luwang dynasty respectively.

== Cultural and historical significance ==
The Khuman dynasty emerged as one of the three main political powers in early Manipur, with the Ningthouja dynasty and Luwang dynasty. Each dynasty represented a major clan of the Meitei confederacy.

== See also ==
- Khumanlol
- Poireiton Khunthok
- Yek Salai
- Meitei people
