= Pamingnaba =

First king and founder of the Luwang dynasty

- Founder of the Luwang dynasty
- Monarchy: c. 2nd century CE
- Successor: Khunthiba
- Issue: Khunthiba
Names
- Pamingnaba Luwang Ningthou
- Dynasty: Luwang dynasty
- Father: Singtangpung Tapung Singminnapa
- Mother: Shanthong Punemba Chanu
- Religion: Sanamahism

Pamingnaba (also spelled Pamingnapa), also known as Luwang Ningthou Pamingnaba, was the first king and founder of the independent Luwang dynasty in ancient Kangleipak (present-day Manipur). He is traditionally recorded as the brother of King Aalong, (Note: also spelled Aarong (ꯑꯥꯔꯣꯡ)) the founder of the Khuman dynasty. Both were sons of King Singtangpung Tapung Singminnapa, (Note: also known as Singtangbung Tabung Singminnaba (ꯁꯤꯡꯇꯥꯡꯕꯨꯡ ꯇꯕꯨꯡ ꯁꯤꯡꯃꯤꯟꯅꯕ)) the last ruler of the united Khuman–Luwang royal lineage.

== Biography ==
=== Early life and heritage ===
Pamingnaba was born into the royal house of the Khuman–Luwang royal lineage, which traced its descent from Poireiton, a cultural hero in Meitei mythology and an early king of ancient Kangleipak. Poireiton, in mythological texts like Poireiton Khunthok, is said to be the brother of the god Thongalen, ruler of the underworld. However, historical chronicles like Khuman Ningthourol present him as the brother of Thawaren, establishing a more human genealogical framework.

Pamingnaba was the eldest son of King Singtangpung Tapung Singminnapa. Upon their father's death, the common royal lineage was divided—Pamingnaba took leadership of the Luwang house, while his younger brother Aalong established the Khuman dynasty.

=== Founding the Luwang dynasty ===
Pamingnaba's rule marked the formation of the independent Luwang dynasty, one of the earliest known principalities in ancient Manipur. He established his capital in the region around present-day Luwangsangbam and asserted authority over large parts of the valley.

The Luwang clan would go on to be one of the three most prominent powers in ancient Kangleipak, alongside the Khuman dynasty and the Ningthouja dynasty.

=== Relationship with contemporaries ===
In order to establish Luwang sovereignty, Pamingnaba probably used diplomatic, territorial, and perhaps military means as a contemporary of Khuyoi Tompok of the Ningthouja dynasty and his own brother Aalong of the Khuman dynasty.

== See also ==
- Aalong
- Poireiton
- Luwang dynasty
- Khuman dynasty
- Khuman and Luwang common ancestral monarchs
- Yek Salai
- Meitei mythology
- Naothingkhong Phambal Khaba
