= Tumaba =

Second ruler of the Khuman dynasty

- Khuman Ningthou
- Reign: est. 220 CE – 260 CE
- Predecessor: Aalong
- Successor: Lungba
- Spouse: Nganurol Thong-ngaiba Chanu
- Dynasty: Khuman dynasty
- Father: Aalong
- Mother: Chinphuren Leitanglen Chinkhubi
- Religion: Sanamahism

Tumaba (also spelled Tumaapa or Tumapa), also known as Tumahaba, was the second recorded ruler of the early Khuman dynasty in ancient Kangleipak (present-day Manipur). He succeeded the Khuman polity's founder, his father, Aalong. The traditional estimation of Tumaba's reign falls between 220 and 260 CE, a time when the previously cohesive Khuman–Luwang lineage broke up into distinct dynastic sovereignties.

== See also ==
- Khuman dynasty
- Aalong
- Pamingnaba
- Khuyoi Tompok
- Ningthouja dynasty
- Luwang dynasty
- Yek Salai
- Poireiton
