= Kumcha Lempi =

Character in Meitei folklore

Kumcha Lempi (/koom-chaa lem-pee/)
- a victim of the Khoirentak tiger's attack
- Member of Characters in the Moirang Kangleirol
- Other names: Kumja Lembi (/koom-jaa lem-bee/)
- Meitei: (Meitei: ꯀꯨꯝꯆꯥ ꯂꯦꯝꯄꯤ)
- Affiliation: Meitei mythology and Meitei folklore
- Major cult center: Moirang
- Adherents: Meitei people
- Gender: female
- Region: Ancient Kangleipak (early Manipur)
- Ethnic group: Meitei people

Kumcha Lempi (Meitei: ꯀꯨꯝꯆꯥ ꯂꯦꯝꯄꯤ, romanized: /koom-chaa lem-pee/), also known as Kumja Lembi (Meitei: ꯀꯨꯝꯖꯥ ꯂꯦꯝꯕꯤ, romanized: /koom-jaa lem-bee/), is a woman in Meitei mythology and folklore of ancient Kangleipak (early Manipur). She is known for being a victim of an attack by a tiger in Khoirentak. Her tragedy is frequently mentioned, narrated and retold in the Moirang Kangleirol legends, usually by the Pena (musical instrument) playing balladeers till present times.

== Etymology ==
In Meitei language, "Kumcha" (Meitei: ꯀꯨꯝꯆꯥ, romanized: /koom-chaa/) (Note: In Meitei language (officially called Manipuri), the sounds of "ch" and "j" are in free variations.) or "Kumja" (Meitei: ꯀꯨꯝꯖꯥ, romanized: /koom-jaa/) means "year" or "yearly" or "annual" or "seasonal", and "Lempi" (Meitei: ꯂꯦꯝꯄꯤ, romanized: /lem-pee/) (Note: In Meitei language (officially called Manipuri), the sounds of "pi" (/pee/) and "bi" (/bee/) are in free variations.) or "Lembi" (Meitei: ꯂꯦꯝꯕꯤ, romanized: /lem-bee/) means "graceful" or "gentle" or "elegant".

== Background ==
Kumcha Lempi (Meitei: ꯀꯨꯝꯆꯥ ꯂꯦꯝꯄꯤ, romanized: /koom-chaa lem-pee/) was very small when her mother died. After some time, her father remarried. Her stepmother was very cruel and rude to her, especially in her father's absence. Kumcha Lempi suffered atrocities and bitter treatments from her evil stepmother in her life.

== Tragedy ==
Once the king of ancient Moirang announced that no one should go out of their respective houses when the sun set off, because a wild tiger from Khoirentak was roaming around freely, among the reeds of the shores of the Loktak lake (Meitei: ꯂꯣꯛꯇꯥꯛ ꯄꯥꯠ, romanized: /lok-taak paat/). Upon hearing such news, Kumcha Lempi's stepmother, who was searching for every possible opportunity to get rid of her poor stepdaughter, intentionally and forcibly sent Kumcha Lempi, in the evening time, to the shore of the Loktak lake, telling her to collect basketful herbs ("yellang keng-ngoi") for that very day's dinner, and not to come back to home if she didn't bring what is said to her to be brought. While collecting herbs to be basketful, it was getting late. On her way, she was spotted by the so called Khoirentak tiger and ended up being devoured by the hungry beast. When the remains of her corpse were discovered by the royal officials, the news reached the ears of the King of Moirang, who ordered Khuman Khamba (Meitei: ꯈꯨꯃꯟ ꯈꯝꯕ) and Nongban (Meitei: ꯅꯣꯡꯕꯥꯟ), to capture the lurking beast, as a divine ordeal of the two men's conflict of getting a hand in marriage to Thoibi (Meitei: ꯊꯣꯏꯕꯤ), the only princess of the kingdom.

== In Meitei literature ==
In Meitei literature (Manipuri literature), lady Kumcha Lempi (Kumja Lembi) is described as a friend of a girl of Kabui ethnicity of the hills of Kangleipak (Meitei for 'Manipur'). Her Kabui friend later turned into a flower named "Chingthrao" (Meitei: ꯆꯤꯡꯊ꯭ꯔꯥꯎ) blessed by God Thangching (Thangjing). Kumja Lembi immortalized her friend's name as "Ching-thrao", which is made of the words, ‘Ching’ (Meitei for '‘Hills’'), ‘Tharo’ (Meitei for '‘Lily’') and ‘Paitha’ (Meitei for '‘Flying Downward’').

== In popular culture ==
- In the session of 2018-19, the Chingu Thangjing Women's Cultural Organization produced a Shumang Kumhei (Meitei for 'Courtyard Theatre') named "Kumjalembi", for which the "Grants Committee to the Cultural Institutions of North-East States" recommended to The National Academy of Music, Dance and Drama (English for 'Sangeet Natak Akademi') for a grant of ₹40,000 (equivalent to ₹54,000 or US$560 in 2023).

== See also ==
- Animals in Meitei culture
- Women in Meitei culture
- Keibu Keioiba and Thabaton
- Haosi Namoinu in the Khongjomnubi Nonggarol
- Lai Khutsangbi
- Loktak Ima
- Sandrembi and Chaisra
- Uchek Langmeitong
- Yenakha Paotapi

== Bibliography ==
- Singh, Wahengbam Ibohal. The History Of Manipur.
- SINGH, SURESH (1986). THE PRINCE AND THE ROSE. LAKSHMIPRIYA DEVI, IMPHAL.
