= Thongak Lairembi =

- Keeper of the Gate to the Underworld
- Member of Lairembis
- Other names: Thongngak Leima (Old Manipuri: Thongngak Leima)
- Major cult center: Langol hills
- Abode: Langol hills
- Texts: Puyas
- Gender: Female
- Region: Manipur)
- Ethnic group: Meitei
- Festivals: Lai Haraoba
- Consort: Thongalen

Thongak Lairembi, is a divine female personification of the death who guards the door of the entrance to the underworld.

== Description ==
Thongak Lairembi (Meitei: ꯊꯣꯡꯉꯥꯛ ꯂꯥꯢꯔꯦꯝꯕꯤ, lit. 'gatekeeper goddess'), also known as Langol Lairemma (Meitei: ꯂꯥꯡꯒꯣꯜ ꯂꯥꯢꯔꯦꯝꯃ), is a goddess in Sanamahism, the indigenous religion of Manipur. She is a divine female personification of the death. She guards the door of the entrance to the underworld, which is ruled by her consort, Thongalen.

Legend says that Thongak Lairembi is parted from her husband Thongalel when he is defeated by Atingkok in the battle between the gods of the underworld and those of the upper world. The winner asks the Thongak Lairembi to become the keeper of the gate to the underworld, and gives Thongalel a new consort Khamnung Kikoi Louonbi, in return.

Every year, Thongak Lairembi is honoured in the Lai Haraoba festival.

== See also ==
- Laikhurembi
