= Chahui Leirong Pampa =

The Chahui Leirong Pampa (ꯆꯥꯍꯨꯏ ꯂꯩꯔꯣꯡ ꯄꯥꯝꯄ), also known as the Chahui Leirong Pamba (ꯆꯥꯍꯨꯏ ꯂꯩꯔꯣꯡ ꯄꯥꯝꯕ), is a classical Meitei language story of courage, love, and the unusual actions of a powerful bull. The story is set during the reign of King Hemton Loyumba (1074–1112). However, the written version was created much later, during the reign of King Nara Singh (1844–1850). It was composed by Atol Nongyai Pukhramba. According to the text, the story had been told for generations and was finally written down at the wish of the king of that time.

== Background ==
The story begins when Samu Khuwang Langmeirempa, a nobleman of Moirang, invites his close friend Nungpal Khwa Langpa of the Luwaopa clan to a celebration held during the leveling of a hillock, which was a custom in earlier days. Nungpal attends with his young son, Chahui Leirong Pampa. Samu Khuwang Langmeirempa also has a daughter, and he becomes impressed with the young man’s character. He wishes to give his daughter in marriage to Chahui Leirong Pampa, and the two families agree to their engagement.

== Death of Nungpal Khwa Langpa ==
During his duty of collecting tribute from a hill village, Nungpal Khwa Langpa meets a tragic death. For some time, the connection between the engaged couple is forgotten. Later, both the young man and woman have the same dream, which reminds Chahui Leirong Pampa of his promise. He visits his fiancee, and they marry soon after. Their happiness does not last long.

== King’s desire and the dangerous mission ==
The king of the land sees Khuwang Langmeirempi and becomes deeply attracted to her. He decides to take her for himself and to remove her husband. He sends Chahui Leirong Pampa to a hostile hill village to bring back a strong and beautiful tree needed for a major festival.

While he is away, the king tries to win Khuwang Langmeirempi. She refuses him because of her loyalty to her husband. Meanwhile, Chahui Leirong Pampa is captured by the hill villagers and tied to a stake to be killed after three days.

The chief of the village, a close friend of Pampa’s late father, secretly sends news to Pampa’s family. He advises them to bring gifts, such as cattle, to save Pampa’s life. With the chief’s help, Pampa escapes, still wearing the heavy wooden fetter on his ankle.

== Bull Ngara Punchangpa ==
On his escape, Pampa meets his wife, his younger brother, and their domestic bull, Ngara Punchangpa, who are already climbing the hillside. The bull then shows its mysterious power: by blowing out air, it can create fire.

When the tribesmen surround them with weapons and loud cries, the bull charges forward. It kills many with its sharp horns, while Pampa and his brother fight the others. The bull then runs into the village and destroys everything in its path. The village is defeated.

== Return to the King ==
The group returns to the king with the required tree, now carried by the youths of the defeated village. The bull follows them. After hearing the story of their struggle, the king rewards Chahui Leirong Pampa and his brother with gold and high positions in the court. Ngara Punchangpa also receives honor when its two horns are covered with gold. The story ends with the idea that true love wins in the end.

== Supernatural and emotional elements ==
The story includes supernatural elements, such as the special power and intelligence of the bull and the invisible ability once shown by Nungpal Khwa Langpa while collecting tribute. Although the writer uses these unbelievable events to shape the story, he also describes strong human emotions.

Before his death, Nungpal Khwa Langpa speaks bravely to his men, refusing to retreat. He asks them to bring his martial dress to his wife and his plume and gold necklace to his young son. He then prepares for battle with a war-dance posture.

== Love between the young couple ==
The writer also shows the beauty and youth of Chahui Leirong Pampa and Khuwang Langmeirempi. She is compared to a pink lotus flower and is described as the most beautiful girl of Kege. Her heart is struck by the “five arrows” of Pampa’s glance, causing her silent longing.

During Pampa’s forced absence, the king visits her at night. She protects herself and does not insult him directly. Instead, she uses a subtle remark about a dog stealing food meant for a nursing mother dog. She calls upon the god of heaven to punish such a wrongdoer. The king understands the hidden meaning and leaves in shame.

Meanwhile, Pampa, tied under sun and cold, thinks of his sorrowing mother and his young wife.

== Historical anchoring and style ==
Although the story contains fantastical events, it includes clear references to the reign of King Loyumba and to well-known locations near the capital. These details give the story a sense of reality. The style of the writing is admired for its use of old vocabulary without becoming unclear. It does not use Indo-Aryan words, even though it was written in the mid-19th century.

== See also ==
- Nungpan Ponpi Luwaopa
- Henjunaha
