= Pati Parmeshwar and Majazi Khuda =

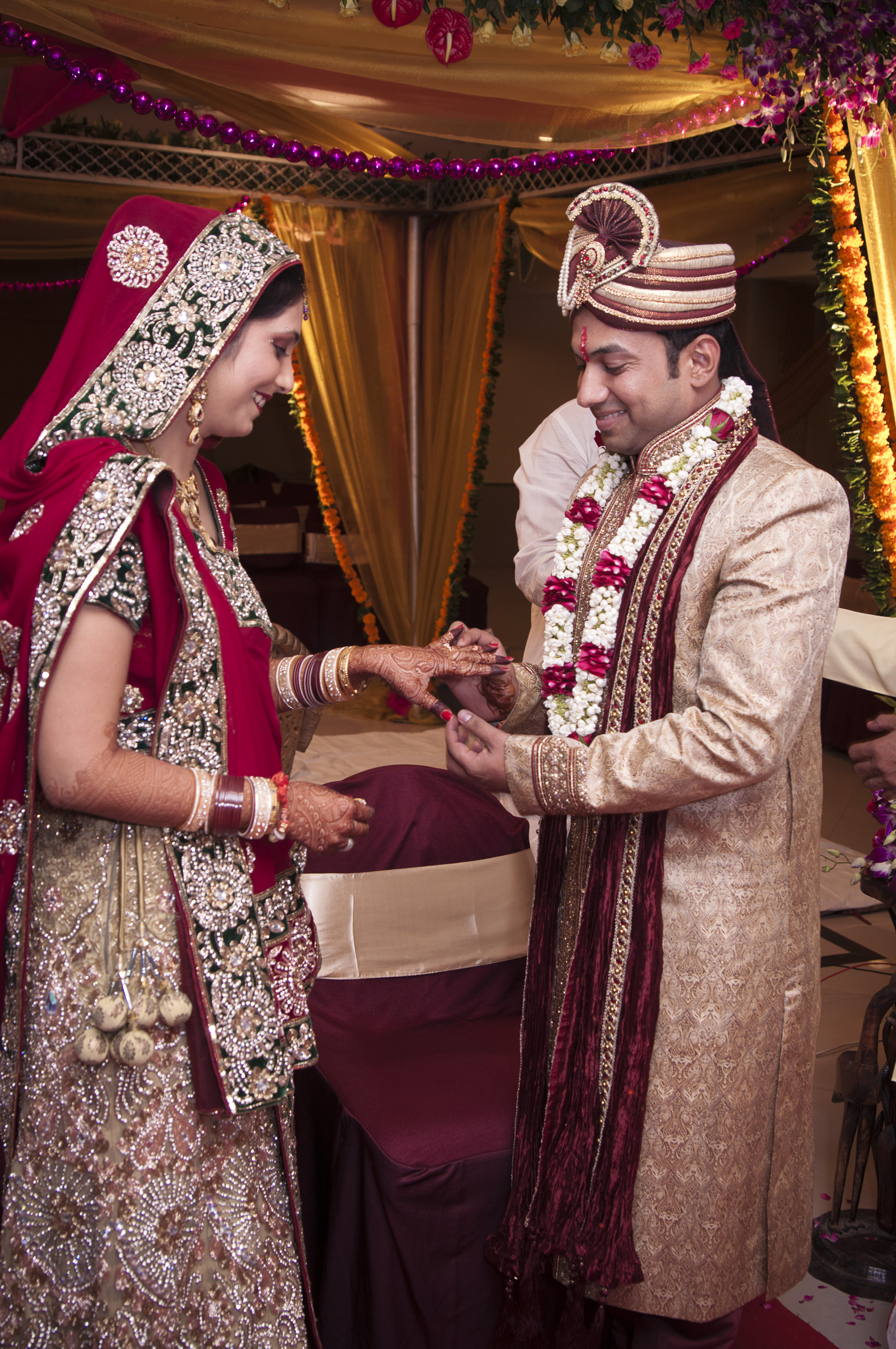
Indian and Pakistani culture teaches the concept of Pati Parmeshwar / Majazi Khuda, in which the husband is regarded by his wife as being next to God.

Pati Parmeshwar (Hindi: पति परमेश्वर, Urdu: پتی پرمیشور), also called Majazi Khuda (Hindi: मजाज़ी ख़ुदा, Urdu: مجازی خدا), is a concept in South Asia that teaches that the husband is akin to a deity, being next to God. This teaching of Pati Parmeshwar or Majazi Khuda holds that it is the husband's role to provide for his wife. Indian and Pakistani women thus regularly pray and fast for their husband. For a South Asian married couple, the husband is viewed by his wife as an aid in her eventual salvation with respect to the afterlife. The concept of Pati Parmeshwar or Majazi Khuda originates in Hinduism, though it has been adopted by many practitioners of Islam in the Indian subcontinent.

== See also ==
- Cultural appropriation
- Cultural assimilation
- Ganga-Jamuni tehzeeb
- Hindu-Muslim unity
- Pativrata
