= Luwang Ningthou Punshiba =

- Solomon of Ancient Manipur
- Monarchy: c. 7th century AD
- Predecessor: King Nongban Pombi Luwaoba
Era name and dates
- Ancient Manipur: c. 7th century AD
Regnal name
- Luwang Punshiba
- Royalty: Luwang dynasty
- Father: King Nongban Pombi Luwaoba (according to legend)
- Mother: Koubru Namoinu (according to legend)
- Religion: Meiteism of Sanamahism
- Occupation: King of the Luwang dynasty

Luwang Ningthou Punshiba, shortly known as Luwang Punshiba (Old Manipuri: Luwang Punshipa), was a king of the Luwang dynasty of Kangleipak in modern-day Manipur. He is best known as god of wisdom and is believed to have lived a long life according to Manipuri folklore and court history.

According to the Hijan Hirao and the Hirol, he is the originator of the Hiyang Tannaba (boat race) with the invention of the Hiyang Hiren (traditional boat).

Some historians opined that Luwang Ningthou Punshiba is the fourth descendant of Poireiton and had nine wives. Regarding relationship with the Meitei kings of the Ningthouja dynasty, Punshiba gave training of state craft and the art of governance to Naothingkhong (663 AD-763 AD) when he was a prince. Besides, the great-grandson of Luwang Ningthou Punshiba (from his first wife) married Meitei king Naothingkhong's's daughter.

However, he is also considered as a mythological divine figure in some literary works.
