= Yumjao Leima =

- All time reigning queen mother Goddess of house, household, royalty, rule and power
- Member of Lairembis
- Other names: Yumjao Lairembi (Old Manipuri: Yumchao Lailempi); Yumjao Lairemma (Old Manipuri: Yumchao Lailemma)
- Affiliation: Meitei mythology (Manipuri mythology) and Meitei religion (Sanamahism)
- Major cult center: Kangla and Sana Konung
- Abodes: houses
- Texts: Puyas
- Gender: Female
- Region: Manipur
- Ethnic group: Meitei ethnicity
- Festivals: Lai Haraoba

Genealogy
- Children: All the Meitei Kings (in spiritual sense)

Equivalents
- Chinese: Queen Mother of the West

Yumjao Leima (Old Manipuri: Yumchao Leima) or Yumjao Lairembi (Old Manipuri: Yumchao Lailempi) or Yumjao Lairemma (Old Manipuri: Yumchao Lailemma) is the mother goddess of house, household, royalty, rule and power in Meitei mythology and religion. She is designated as the all time ruling Queen Mother. Legend says she assumes a human form in white clothes and blesses kings. She is one of the divine incarnations of Leimarel Sidabi.

== Etymology ==
In Meitei language (Manipuri language), "Yumjao" (Old Manipuri: Yumchao) means "large house" or "big house". "Yumjao" (Old Manipuri: Yumchao) or "Yimjao" (Old Manipuri: Yimchao) may also refer to "Royal House". In Meitei language (Manipuri language), "Leima" means "Queen". In Meitei language (Manipuri language), "Lairembi" (Old Manipuri: Lailempi) means "goddess". The Meitei language (Manipuri language) word "Lairemma" (Old Manipuri: Lailemma) is also another term for "goddess".

== History ==
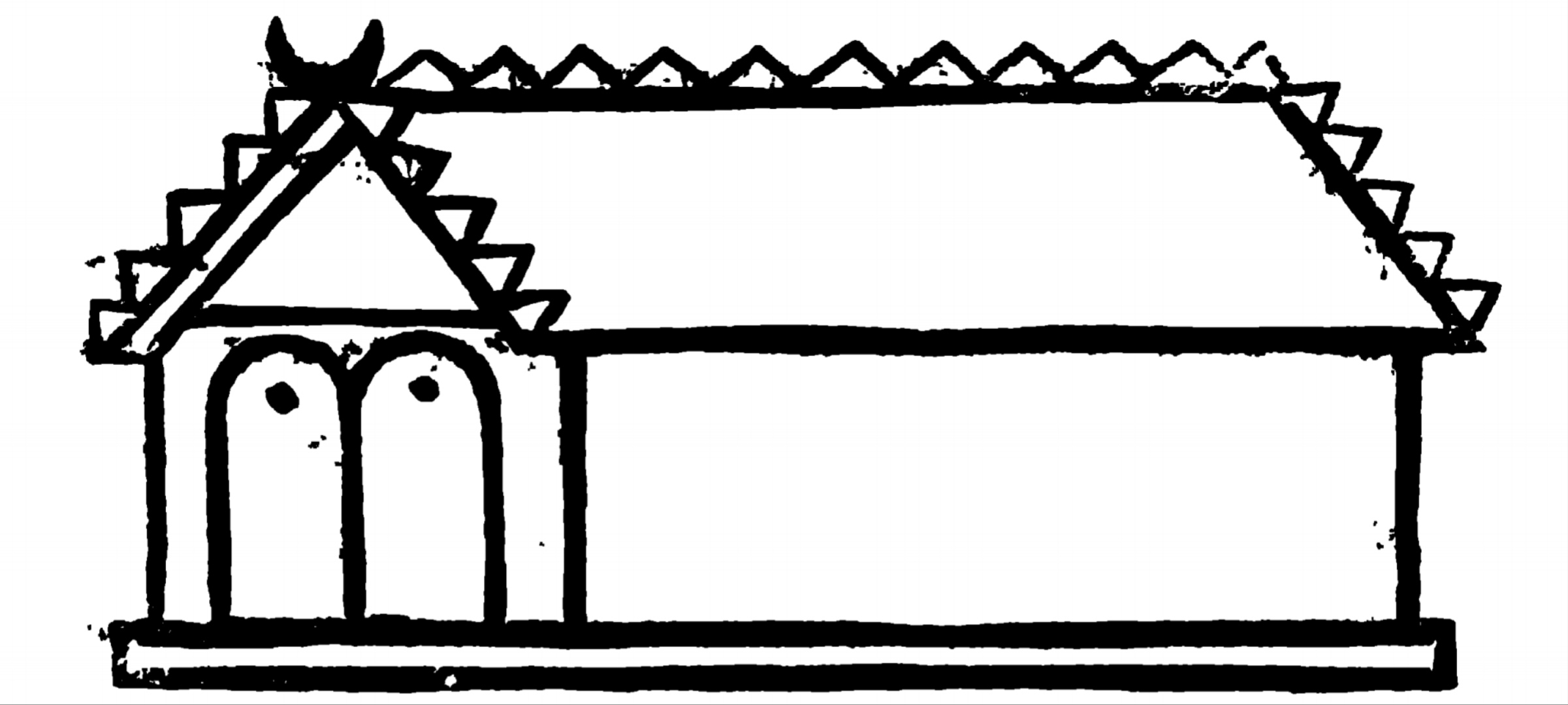
An illustration of a temple dedicated to goddess Yumjao Leima (Old Manipuri: Yumchao Leima) built in Meitei architecture.

Meitei King Naothingkhong (c. 7th century) of Ancient Kangleipak (Antique Manipur) built a temple dedicated to goddess Yumjao Lairembi (Old Manipuri: Yumchao Lailempi).

== Mythology ==
Goddess Yumjao Leima appears in a human form in white clothes to come to bless her son, the King of the kingdom. Even during the death of a king, she came to the place in the form of a mortal being. She controls the life and the death of the kings. She is the chief of the household and the guidance of the kings.

== Relationship with the Queen Mother ==
Yumjao Leima is the divine representation of the Queen Mother of Kangleipak. All former queen mothers are integrated into the goddess. The Meitei kings ruled in the names of their Queen Mothers. Battles and wars were conducted in the name of the Queen Mothers. In former times of war, the severed heads of enemies were offered to the goddess.

== Worship ==
Worshippers pray to Yumjao Leima for the longevity of the King. Her rites and rituals are performed by the Nongmai or middle-ranking class of maibis (priestesses) who lead her cult. Yumjao Lairemma is mainly worshipped by the Thaopicham clan.

== Temples ==
=== Temple of Yumjao Lairembi, Kangla ===
The "Temple of Yumjao Lairembi" inside the Kangla is at the left side of the Temple of Pakhangba. Structurally, both the temples are of the same architectural styles. The southern wall of the temple is well decorated. The remaining three walls of the temple are of little decorations. A door with the lancite arch is in the southern wall of the temple. Two false doors surround the two sides of the one real door. All the doors (real and false) are framed with pilasters. The ground plan of the temple is in square shape. Its area covered is 2.43 square meters.

=== Ima Ibemma Yumjao Lairembi Shanglen ===
In October 2011, a temple named "Ima Ibemma Yumjao Lairembi Shanglen" was built in honor of goddess Yumjao Lairembi in Thangmeiband town in Imphal.

=== Others ===
- A temple dedicated to Yumjao Lairembi of Arambam region is in Imphal West district in Manipur.
- Yumjao Lairembi Temple is in Meino Leirak, Sagolband, Imphal, Manipur.
- Thaoroijam Yumjao Lairembi Temple is in Thaoroijam Mamang Leikai, Nambol, Manipur.

== Namesakes ==
=== Yumjao Lairembi Dramatic and Cultural Union ===
The "Yumjao Lairembi Dramatic and Cultural Union" is a nonprofit dramatic union. It was established in Khagempali Huidrom Leikai, Imphal in the year 2011.

== Related pages ==
- Laikhurembi

== Bibliography ==
- Archaeology in Manipur - Page 149 - L. Kunjeswori Devi · 2003
- Proceedings of North East India History Association - North East India History Association. Session · 1988
- Recent Researches in Oriental Indological Studies: Including Meiteilogy - Page 188 - Moirangthem Kirti Singh · 1998
- The History of Manipur: An early period - Page 263 - Wahengbam Ibohal Singh · 1986
- Bhogeshwor, Oinam (1971). Yumjao Leima (in Manipuri) – via archive.org.
