= Uripok =

- city
- Location in Manipur, India Uripok (India)
- Coordinates: 24.8093°N 93.9195°E
- Country: India
- State: Manipur
- District: Imphal West

Language(s)
  - Official: Meiteilon (officially called Manipuri)
- Time zone: UTC+5:30 (IST)
- Postal code: 795001
- Vehicle registration: MN
- Website: manipur.gov.in

Uripok (Meitei pronunciation:/ū-rī-pōk/) is a census town in Imphal West district in the Indian state of Manipur.

== Cult of Laikhurembi ==
In Uripok, there is a temple devoted to the goddess Laikhurembi. A carnival-like atmosphere subdues the sacred traditional ritualistic ceremonies during the festival of Lai Haraoba. The maibis (priestesses) dance to the melodies produced by pena. When the music stops, the maibis become possessed by the spirits, delivering oracles. The audience listens attentively to their words.
