= Khoirentak tiger =

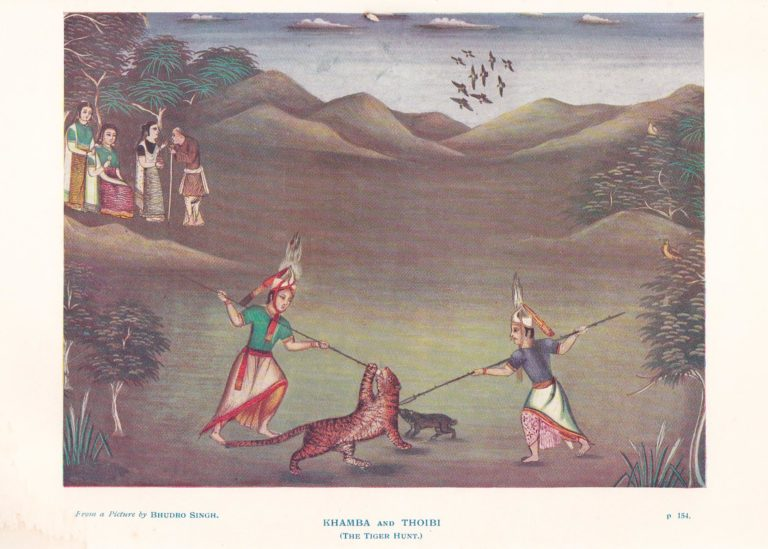

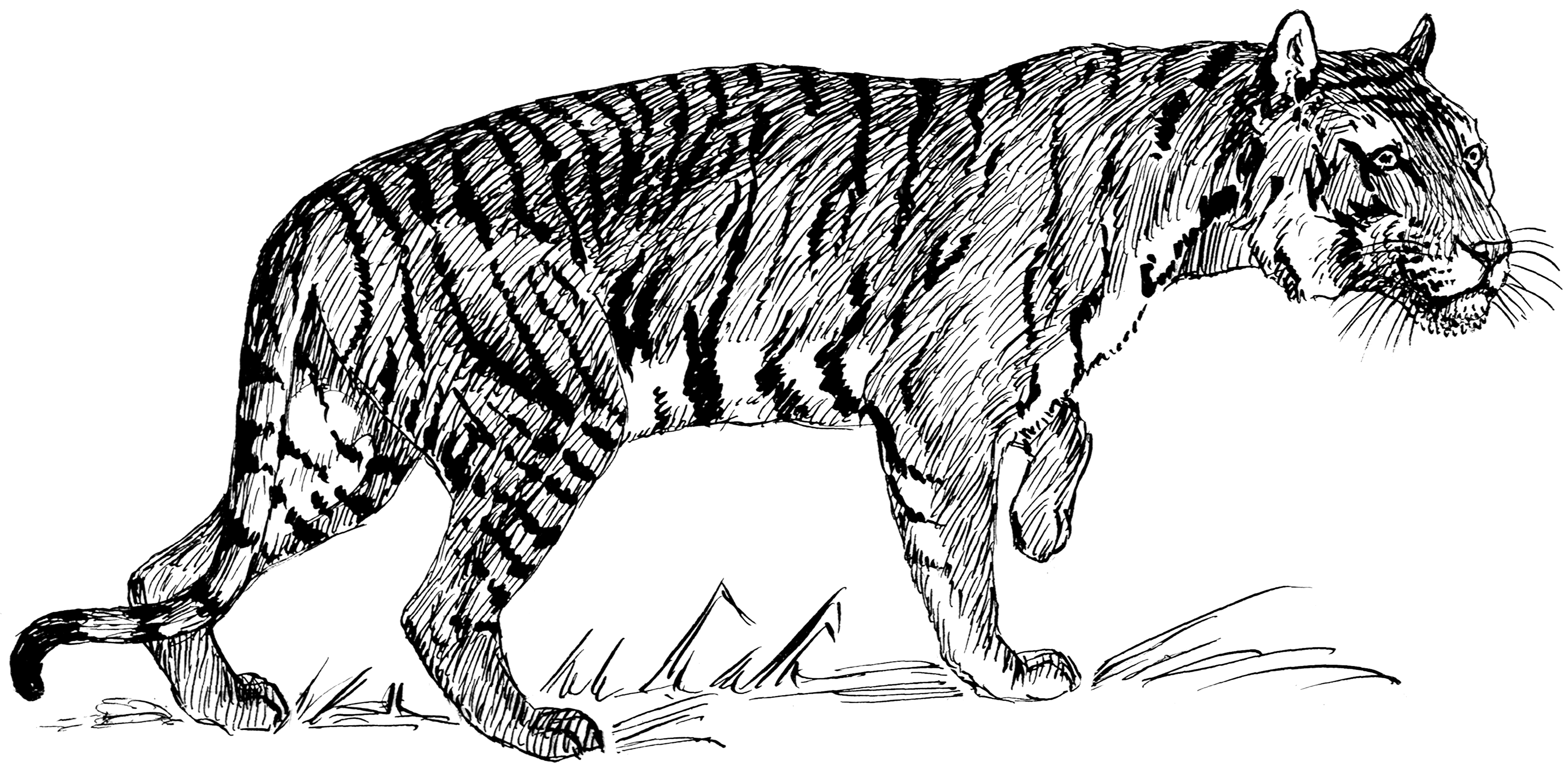

The Khoirentak tiger (Meitei: ꯈꯣꯢꯔꯦꯟꯇꯥꯛ ꯀꯤ ꯀꯩꯔꯦꯜ) was a vicious monster in Meitei mythology that lived in Khoirentak. It was eventually killed by Khuman Khamba. The tiger caused havoc to the people of the Khoirentak in Ancient Moirang, thereby becoming the "man eater" of the region. Finally, Khuman Khamba and Nongban were ordered by the king, to catch the beast. In the first encounter, Nongban was killed by the tiger and at the final meet, Khuman Khamba successfully captured and killed it. Finally, when he brought it to the capital city of Ancient Moirang, Thoibi was given to him, hand in marriage.

== Background ==
The tiger lived in the forests of the Khoirentak region and attacked villagers. It became a serious threat to the people and was responsible for several deaths. The events related to the tiger later became part of a major conflict involving royal figures of Moirang.

== Victims of the tiger ==
One notable victim was Kumja Lembi, also known as Kumcha Lempi. She was a poor girl who lived with her stepmother and father. Her father was often away from home because of work. Her stepmother sent her to the forest to collect herbs. During this task, she was killed by the tiger.

Another victim was Angom Nongban Kongyamba, who was seriously injured by the tiger during the later events. He later died from these injuries.

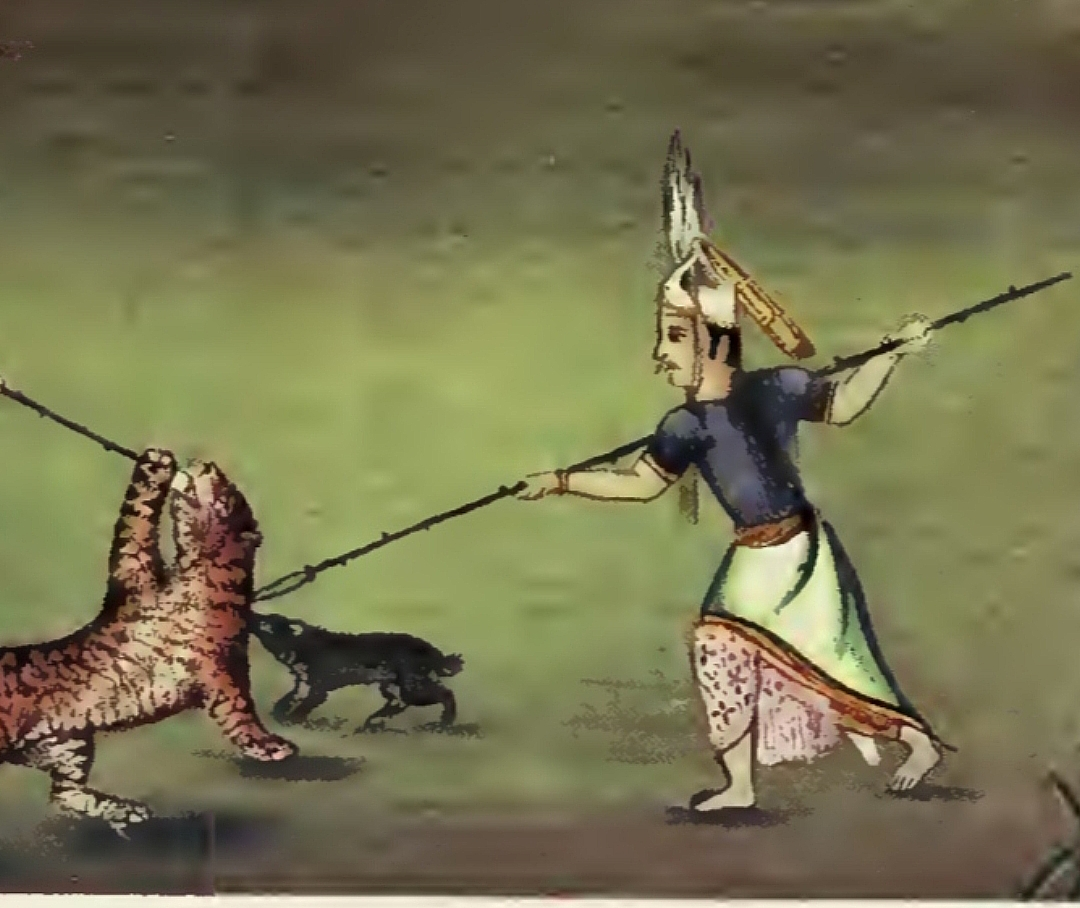
Angom Nongban Kongyamba using a spear, trying to kill a tiger before his death

== Cause of the hunt ==
Princess Thoibi of Moirang was returning from Kabo (Kabow) to Moirang and encountered her suitor, Angom Nongban Kongyamba on her way back. Thoibi did not like him. She rode Kongyamba’s horse, while Kongyamba sat in Thoibi’s palanquin. Thoibi tricked him and rode the horse quickly to the house of her true lover, Khuman Khamba, who had been in long exile.

Khamba welcomed Thoibi, and they wept together after their reunion. Kongyamba became angry after being tricked. He sought help from the king’s ministers to interfere in the matter. Ministers Thonglen and Chaoba Nongtholba sent men to protect Khamba and Thoibi.

The issue was brought before King Chingkhu Telheiba in the royal court. The king first planned to settle the matter through a trial of the spear.

== Tiger as the final test ==
During the court discussion, an old man from the Phubala region informed the king about the dangerous tiger threatening the people of Khoirentak. After hearing this, the king changed his decision. He declared that killing the tiger would decide the matter. He announced that whoever killed the tiger would marry Princess Thoibi.

== Hunt and death of the tiger ==
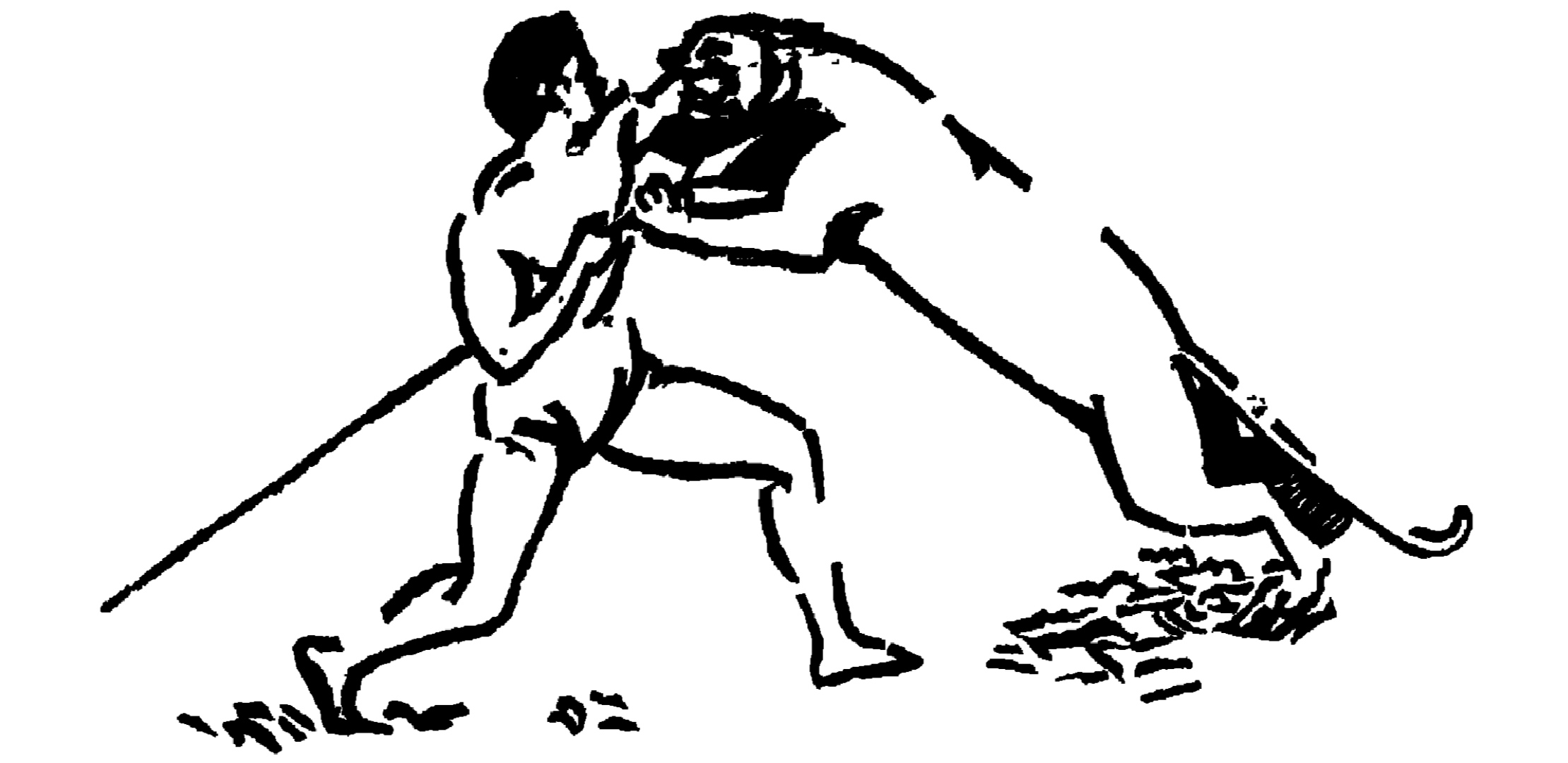
Khamba capturing the tiger

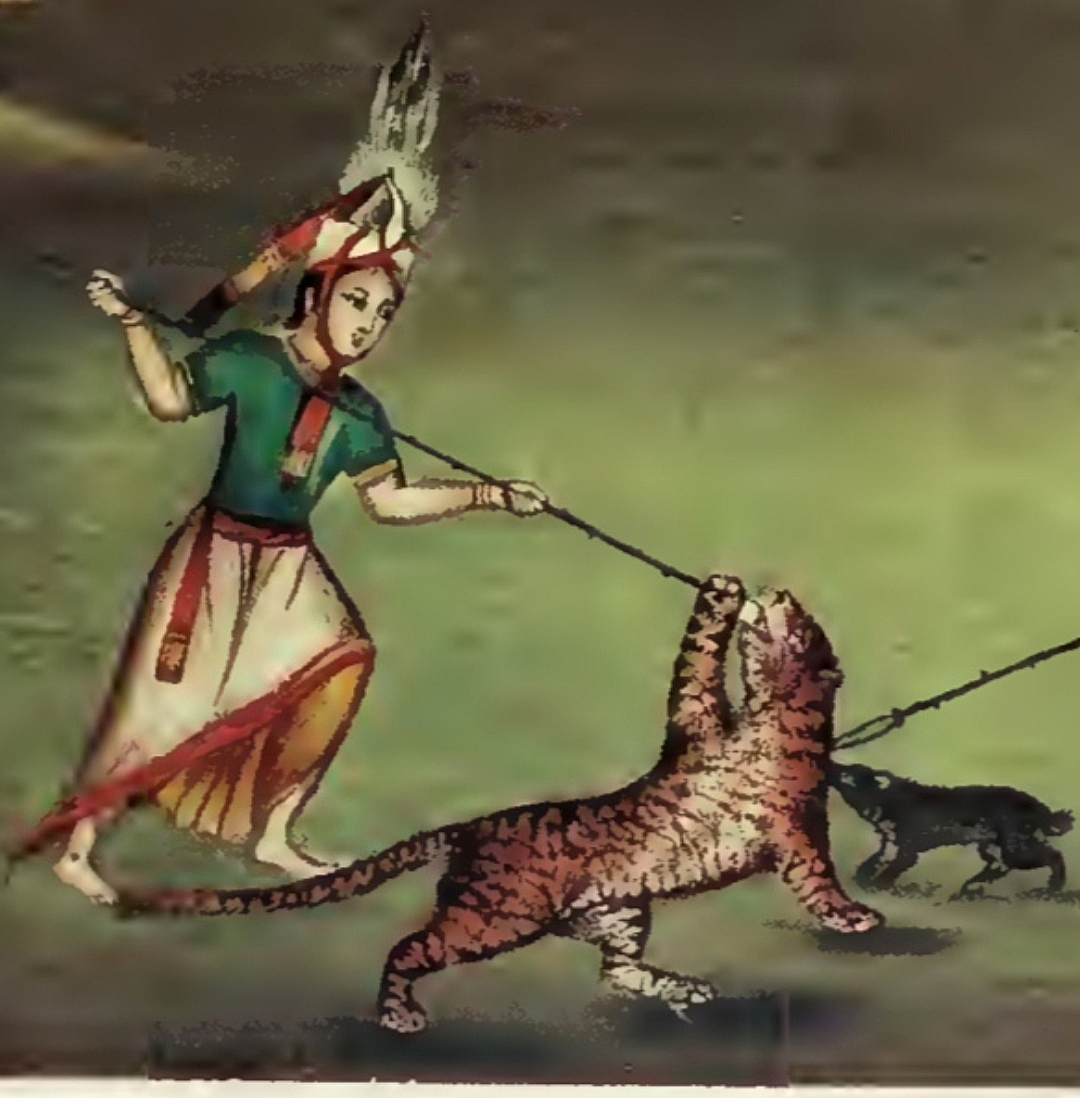
Khuman Khamba using a spear in a mission to kill a tiger

Trackers and scouts surrounded the forest. On the chosen day, the king and his ministers gathered in a stadium near the forest. A large crowd was present. Khamba and Kongyamba showed respect to the king and entered the forest.

They found the tiger’s tracks and later saw the body of a recently killed girl. When they found the tiger, both threw their spears, but the tiger avoided them. The tiger then attacked Kongyamba and bit him, causing his death.

Khamba fought the tiger and drove it away. He carried Kongyamba’s body back to the stadium. Minister Thonglen encouraged Khamba to return to the forest and kill the tiger.

Khamba went back. The tiger was hiding in the bushes but was visible from the king’s stadium. The tiger jumped at Khamba. Khamba struck the tiger in its jaws with his spear and finally killed it.

== Consequences of the hunt ==
After the tiger was killed, the king rewarded Khamba with rich gifts. He granted him large lands, fishing rights, clothes of honor, high titles, and control of a salt well.

Khamba and Princess Thoibi were then married with great ceremony by the King of Moirang.

After their marriage, Khamnu, Khamba’s elder sister, married Feiroijamba, the son of Minister Chaoba Nongthonba. This fulfilled an earlier marriage agreement made between Chaoba Nongthonba and Khamnu’s father, Purenba.
