= Haosi Namoinu =

Character in Meitei mythology and folklore

- Other names: Hausi Namoinu
- Affiliation: Meitei mythology, Meitei folklore
- Animals: cicada or cricket
- Texts: Khongjomnubi Nonggarol and Hāosi Nāmoinu
- Gender: Female
- Region: Ancient Moirang, Kangleipak
- Ethnic group: Meitei people
- Parents: Pokmabi Laoshigam Chanu (mother) and Senbi Loikenba (father)

Haosi Namoinu is a character in Meitei mythology and folklore of Kangleipak in India. After being mistreated by her stepmother, she transforms into a cicada (or cricket, depending on the version) and flies away from the human world.

== Story ==
She was the only daughter of Lady Pokmabi Laoshigam Chanu and Lord Senbi Loikenba. Her father was a minister of Ancient Moirang, in charge of collecting tributes from the land of Kabo (present day Western Myanmar).

After Haosi Namoinu's mother's untimely death, her father remarried to Nganurol Laoshigam Chanu (Loisingam Chanu), her mother's sister. Spending a few days happily, Senbi Loikenba left for Kabo on the King's errand and during his absence, Haosi Namoinu was harshly treated by her stepmother. She was not allowed to go outside and play with her friends. She had to work as hard as she could to satisfy her stepmother. She was forced to husk rice, cook food, and serve it. Despite this, she uttered no lamentation. Haosi Namoinu's stepmother told her that if she wanted to join the feast (spring festival), she had to go to the maternal grandparents' house and bring a load of paddy rice (un-husked rice). She did so, but her stepmother was still not satisfied, and struck her head with a cookery utensil. Having been deprived of all youthful delights, the girl transformed herself into a Harinongnang (Meitei for 'cicada'), or cricket in some versions, with her clothes as wings and feathers, and flew away with ravishing tears.

== In ancient texts ==
=== Khongjomnubi Nonggarol ===
The story of lady Haosi Namoinu is mentioned in the Khongjomnubi Nongarol as one of its two content stories. The following is a passage from the text:

One day Hāosināmoinu tenderly told her step-mother Lousikām Chanu that that day she and her companions of equal age and similar haircut had decided to have among themselves a match of kang. So she requested to allow her fetch the basketful load of paddy from the distant barn the next morning when the sun just shoots up with his brilliant rays, which the ill-natured and acid-tongued step-mother did not take kindly, and fiercely insisted on carrying out the task as enjoined. There was no means of escape for the poor girl, but on her return hardly had she stepped into the house and unloaded the heavy weight, when the termagant woman, always disquieting like boiling water, again bade her to perform household chores like husking the paddy with the pestle on the mortar and toil for fine grained rice. Unable to bear any further, the hapless girl made a retort against her saucy step-mother who, instantly flying into a rage, hit her head with a laddle. Then blood profusely rushed out of it.

— Khongjomnubi Nonggarol

=== Hāosi Nāmoinu ===
Other than the Khongjomnubi Nongarol, another ancient treatise named "Hāosi Nāmoinu", tells the story of lady Haosi Namoinu. The following is a quote from the text, describing the ethos of the people:

Like brothers and sisters born of the same parents, they then share to partake of what each possesses. "We will not depart together when the end of the journey comes. The end must definitely come for each one of us, but nobody knows when it may. We only know that all of us are waiting for that day. Good and delicious food nourishes the Jody and fine clothes make one handsome. There is an old saying that 'Pleasure makes one the king's companion and despondency only a grass-cutter.' Therefore, let us be mirthful and celebrate the new season. Let us, both young and old, play kangjei and play with fire burning the dry bushes. All men and women should make sumptuous feasts to dine together. You womenfolk should enter into competition for preparing new beautiful dresses and you menfolk for rounding up deer and other animals. After such a joyous feasting, let both men and women indulge in the play of kang by erecting a huge hall."

— Hāosi Nāmoinu

== See also ==
- Cicadas in mythology
- List of Meitei folktales

- Khongjomnubi Nongarol
- Sandrembi Chaisra
- Uchek Langmeidong
