= Pativrata =

Concept of husband fidelity in Hinduism

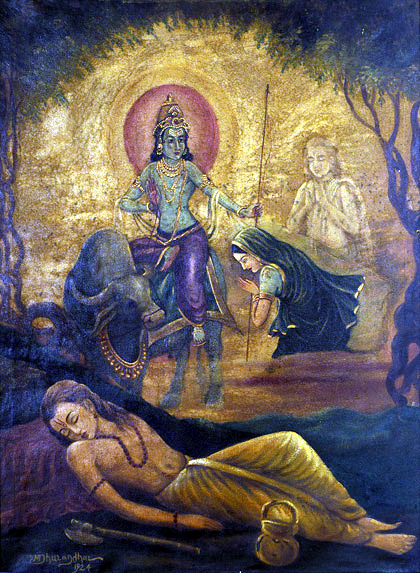
Savitri is described as an ideal pativrata, depicted here rescuing her husband Satyavan's life from the god of death, Yama.

Pativrata (Sanskrit: पतिव्रता, romanized: Pativratā, lit. 'husband vow') is a term used in Hinduism to refer to the conjugal fidelity of a woman towards her husband. It also refers to the term used to refer to a married woman who is faithful and dutiful to her husband.

Hindus generally believe that when a wife is devoted to her husband and serves his needs, she brings prosperity and well-being to her family.

== Etymology ==
Pativrata literally means a virtuous wife who has made a vow (vrata) to her husband (pati) of her devotion and protection.

== Beliefs ==
A pativrata is described to listen to her husband and act accordingly to his needs. A pativrata is regarded to protect her husband in two ways. Firstly, she attends to his personal needs and encourages him to do his duty (dharma). Secondly, she undertakes various rituals and fasts to please the deities, hoping that they would protect her husband from harm and grant him a long life.

Sati is often used as a synonym for a pativrata - one who preserves her purity (sattva) - physically, mentally, and emotionally. It is also used to denote a woman who immolates herself on the funeral pyre of her dead husband.

== Literature ==
The pativrata of a wife towards her husband is a recurring theme in Hindu literature, and occurs in various legends of Hindu mythology. It is a concept that is usually portrayed to be a powerful factor that protects a woman's husband from curses, death, and any ill-omens that threaten his well-being.

The Ramayana features Sita, whose pativrata to her husband, Rama, is described throughout the epic. Sita does not hesitate to spend fourteen years of exile that Rama is ordered to undertake in the forest, giving up all of her earthly comforts to fulfil her duty to him. She does not experience any fear when she is abducted by Ravana, and remains faithful to her husband throughout her captivity. In the Uttara Kanda, she does not question the agnipariksha when she is asked to prove her chastity to Rama due to the demands of the common people to do so.

The legend of Savitri and Satyavan of the Mahabharata is often stated to exemplify the concept of a pativrata, where the devotion of a princess named Savitri towards her husband, Satyavan, saves him from his predestined early demise from the god of death himself.

According to the Brahmanda Purana, while Sage Mandavya was punished by impalement due to being mistaken for an accomplice in a theft, Ugrashravas, the husband of a devoted wife named Shilavati, wished to visit the house of his favourite prostitute. Shilavati agreed to carry him to her house. When the couple came across Mandavya, the latter understood the man's intentions, and cursed him to die before the next sunrise. Horrified, Shilavati, with her piety, ensured that Surya, the sun god, would not rise the next dawn. Since this led to universal chaos, the devas approached Anasuya, who convinced Shilavati to have the sun rise again.

== Religious practices ==
The Varalakshmi Vratam refers to a Hindu observance in which married Hindu women in South India offer their prayers to the goddess Lakshmi for a prosperous marriage and the continued health of their husbands. The Karva Chauth is a similar observance held in North India when women pray for the longevity of their husbands. The Savitri Vrata is a fast undertaken by women to pray for the long lives of their husbands in certain regions.

== See also ==
- Karva Chauth
- Pati (title)
- Sunulembi
- Varalakshmi Vratam
- Ekapatnivrata
- Pati Parmeshwar and Majazi Khuda
