= Atingkok =

- Supreme Creator God; King of the Heaven and God of the Sky
- Member of Primordial deities
- "Atingkok" is represented by the Meitei numerical letter "꯱" ("Ama", meaning "One").
- Other names: Names of the Supreme God in Meitei religion
- Meitei: ꯑꯇꯤꯡꯀꯣꯛ
- Affiliation: Meitei religion (Sanamahism)
- Abode: Everywhere
- Weapons: Thunderbolt, spear, polo stick
- Texts: Wakoklon Heelel Thilel Salai Amailon Pukok Puya, Khongjomnubi Nongarol, Konthoujam Nongarol, Leisemlon, Leithak Leikharol, Sakok Lamlen, Tutenglon
- Gender: Male
- Region: Ancient Manipur
- Ethnic group: Meitei ethnicity
- Festivals: Lai Haraoba

Genealogy
- Consorts: Leimarel Sidabi, Konthoujam Tampha Lairembi
- Children: Emoinu (in spiritual sense), Ereima, Hellois (7 in number), Khoriphaba, Ngaleima, Nongshaba (Kanglasha), Nongthang Leima, Pakhangba, Panthoipi (in spiritual sense), Phouleima, Sanamahi, Thumleima

Equivalents
- Greek: Zeus
- Hindu: Vishnu, Indra
- Roman: Jupiter

Atingkok (Meitei: ꯑꯇꯤꯡꯀꯣꯛ) (literally, "father void") is the Supreme Creator God of the universe in Meitei mythology and religion. He is regarded as the legendary male ancestor of the living beings on the earth.

== Names ==

In Sanamahism (Meitei religion), Atingkok, the Supreme God is known with 1000 names as mentioned in multiple Meitei scriptures. In Sanamahism, the Supreme God, himself, is the Creator of the Universe as well as the King of the Heaven. He is also the God of the Sky. He is the one who controls weather, rain, thunder and lightning.

English Translations	Classical Meitei	Transliteration (including different spellings)
"The Round Hemisphere" or "The Endless Sky" or "The Eternal one"	ꯀꯨꯂꯨ (ꯀꯨꯔꯨ)	Kulu (Kuru)
"The Supreme Breeder"	ꯁꯂꯥꯢꯂꯦꯟ/ꯁꯂꯥꯏꯂꯦꯟ (ꯁꯂꯥꯢꯂꯦꯜ/ꯁꯂꯥꯏꯂꯦꯜ, ꯁꯂꯥꯢꯔꯦꯟ/ꯁꯂꯥꯏꯔꯦꯟ, ꯁꯂꯥꯢꯔꯦꯜ/ꯁꯂꯥꯏꯔꯦꯜ)	Salailen (Salailel, Salairen or Salairel)
"Immortal Master" or "Eternal God" or "Immortal God"	ꯁꯤꯇꯄ ꯃꯄꯨ (ꯁꯤꯗꯕ ꯃꯄꯨ)	Sitapa Mapu (Sidaba Mapu)
"King of the Gods"	ꯁꯣꯔꯥꯔꯦꯟ/ꯁꯣꯔꯥꯔꯦꯜ	Soraren/Sorarel
"King of the Gods"	ꯂꯥꯢ ꯅꯤꯡꯊꯧ (ꯂꯥꯏ ꯅꯤꯡꯊꯧ)	Lai Ningthou
"High God"	ꯂꯥꯢ ꯑꯋꯥꯡꯄ/ꯂꯥꯏ ꯑꯋꯥꯡꯕ	Lai Awangpa/Lai Awangba
"King of the Sky" or "King of the Rains"	ꯅꯣꯡ ꯅꯤꯡꯊꯧ	Nong Ningthou
"King of the Gods"	ꯆꯤꯉꯨ ꯅꯤꯡꯊꯧ	Chingu Ningthou/Chi-ngoo Ningthou
"Divine King with flawless aim"	ꯆꯤꯉꯨ ꯅꯤꯡꯊꯧ ꯄꯥꯟꯆꯨꯝꯄ (ꯆꯤꯉꯨ ꯅꯤꯡꯊꯧ ꯄꯥꯟꯖꯨꯝꯕ)	Chingu Ningthou/Chi-ngoo Ningthou Paanchumpa (Paanjumba)
"Master of the Universe"	ꯇꯥꯏꯄꯪ ꯃꯄꯨ/ꯇꯥꯢꯄꯪ ꯃꯄꯨ (ꯇꯥꯏꯕꯪ ꯃꯄꯨ/ꯇꯥꯢꯕꯪ ꯃꯄꯨ)	Taipang Mapu (Taibang Mapu)
"Master of the Universe"	ꯇꯦꯡꯄꯥꯟꯄ ꯃꯄꯨ (ꯇꯦꯡꯕꯥꯟꯕ ꯃꯄꯨ)	Tengpanpa Mapu (Tengbanba Mapu)
"King of Thunder and Lightning"	ꯈꯥꯛꯄ ꯅꯤꯡꯊꯧ	Khaakpa Ningthou/Khakpa Ningthou
"King of the Gods"	ꯈꯣꯌꯨꯝ ꯅꯤꯡꯊꯧ	Khoyum Ningthou
"The Supreme Soul"	ꯌꯥꯢꯄꯤꯂꯦꯜ/ꯌꯥꯏꯄꯤꯂꯦꯜ (ꯌꯥꯢꯄꯤꯂꯦꯟ/ꯌꯥꯏꯄꯤꯂꯦꯟ, ꯌꯥꯢꯄꯤꯔꯦꯜ/ꯌꯥꯏꯄꯤꯔꯦꯜ, ꯌꯥꯢꯄꯤꯔꯦꯟ/ꯌꯥꯏꯄꯤꯔꯦꯟ)	Yaipilel (Yaipilen, Yaipirel, Yaipiren)
"The Supreme Soul"	ꯌꯥꯢꯕꯤꯂꯦꯜ/ꯌꯥꯏꯕꯤꯂꯦꯜ (ꯌꯥꯢꯕꯤꯂꯦꯟ/ꯌꯥꯏꯕꯤꯂꯦꯟ, ꯌꯥꯢꯕꯤꯔꯦꯜ/ꯌꯥꯏꯕꯤꯔꯦꯜ, ꯌꯥꯢꯕꯤꯔꯦꯟ/ꯌꯥꯏꯕꯤꯔꯦꯟ)	Yaibilel (Yaibilen, Yaibirel, Yaibiren)
"Supreme Grandfather"	ꯏꯄꯨꯂꯣꯢ/ꯏꯄꯨꯂꯣꯏ (ꯏꯄꯨꯔꯣꯢ/ꯏꯄꯨꯔꯣꯏ)	Eepuloi (Eepuroi)
	ꯑꯆꯤꯄ/ꯑꯆꯤꯕ	Achipa/Achiba
	ꯑꯇꯤꯛꯉꯥ	Atik-ngaa
"The Void" or "An empty space"	ꯑꯇꯤꯡꯀꯣꯛ	Atingkok
"The Sky"	ꯑꯇꯤꯌꯥ	Atiya
"High"	ꯑꯋꯥꯡꯄ/ꯑꯋꯥꯡꯕ	Awangpa/Awangba
"Eastern Handsome Man" or "Highland Handsome Man"	ꯑꯋꯥꯡ ꯄꯥꯈꯪ ꯌꯣꯏꯂꯦꯜꯄ (ꯌꯣꯏꯔꯦꯜꯄ)	Awang Pakhang Yoilelpa (Yoirelpa)

== See also ==
- List of figures in Meitei mythology
