= Sunulembi =

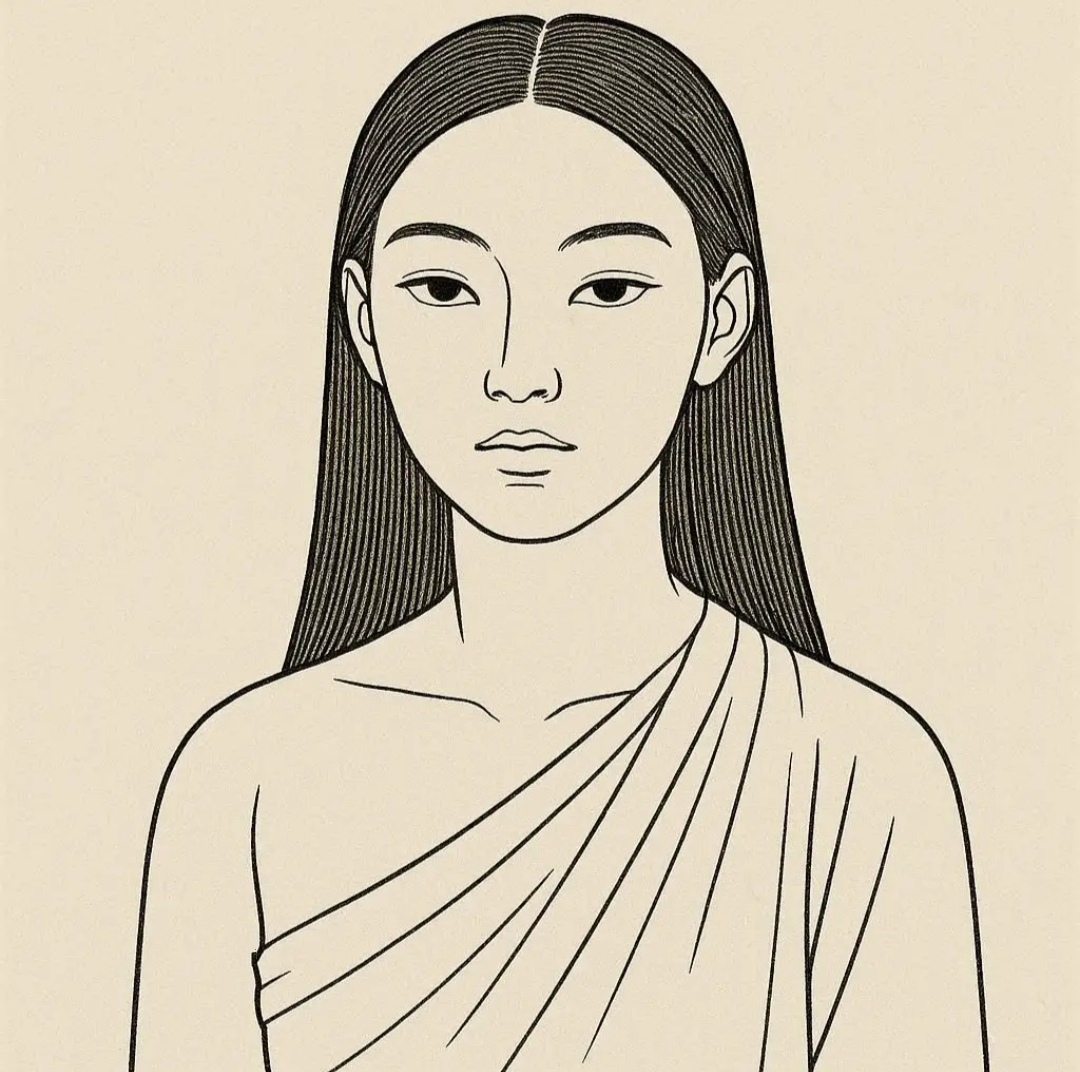
Lady Leima Sunulembi

Sunulembi (ꯁꯨꯅꯨꯂꯦꯝꯕꯤ), also known as Leima Sunulembi (transl. Queen Sunulembi), is a central figure in the 18th-century Meitei literary work Chothe Thangwai Pakhangba. She is depicted as the devoted wife of Chothe Thangwai Pakhangba and is celebrated for her courage, steadfastness, and profound love.

== Background ==
Chothe Thangwai Pakhangba is an anonymous work from the 18th century. The story is set in the region of Moirang and centers on the love between Chothe Thangwai Pakhangba and Sunulembi. Though the work is named after Chothe Thangwai Pakhangba, much of the narrative highlights Sunulembi’s role and character.

== Early life ==
Sunulembi was the daughter of Thongnang Loikemba, who was of Cachari origin. Her early life is not described in detail, but she is introduced as a young woman of notable beauty and character.

== Marriage ==
Chothe Thangwai Pakhangba, the son of King Thangwai Koting Ahanba and Queen Leima Thammoilengpi, fell in love with Sunulembi at first sight. They were formally engaged and married in a grand ceremony. The union is depicted as one of true love and devotion, but it was also challenged by divine will.

== Challenges ==
According to the story, Chothe Thangwai Pakhangba was destined by Soraren, the god of heaven, to have a short life and to be nourished only with divine food. When the young couple ascended toward heaven together, they faced several obstacles:

- They first reached a realm under deep flood waters, where Sunulembi insisted on accompanying her husband.
- They encountered a swarm of snakes that threatened their progress, which they overcame through courage and Chothe Thangwai Pakhangba’s intervention.
- When they reached the abode of Soraren, they were initially forbidden to enter because a worldly couple could not live in heaven.

Sunulembi demonstrated extraordinary devotion and courage, resisting all threats posed by the god, including a wild boar, a tiger, floods, fire, and even a hill-kite. Her determination and unwavering love ultimately persuaded Soraren to restore her husband to her and grant him the kingdom of Moirang.

== Character ==
Sunulembi is portrayed as calm, composed, and steadfast in love. She is described as a symbol of devoted and fearless love, often compared favorably with legendary figures such as Savitri and Orpheus. Her courage and devotion are central to the narrative, and the story highlights her as a heroic figure who overcomes divine obstacles to remain with her husband.

== Cultural significance ==
The story of Sunulembi shows elements of the society of ancient Moirang. It shows social customs, such as marriage arrangements and parental involvement, as well as personal qualities like loyalty, courage, and devotion. Sunulembi’s character has been recognized as a literary example of heroic and devoted love in Meitei culture.

== See also ==
- Women in Meitei civilisation
- Nungpan Ponpi Luwaopa
- Henjunaha
- Savitri and Satyavan
- Pativrata
- Orpheus and Eurydice
- Izanami and Izanagi
