= Khamnung Kikoi Louonbi =

Meitei Goddess who takes souls to the underworld

Khamnung Kikoi Lou Onbi
- Enchantress goddess of death who carries off the souls of people to the underworld
- Member of Lairembis
- Other names: Nura Naothem Heibi
- Abode: Underworld (Meitei: Khamnung)
- Texts: Puyas
- Gender: Female
- Region: Manipur
- Ethnic group: Meitei
- Consort: Thongalen

Khamnung Kikoi Louonbi (Meitei: ꯈꯝꯅꯨꯡ ꯀꯤꯀꯣꯢ ꯂꯧꯑꯣꯟꯕꯤ) is a goddess in Sanamahism, the indigenous religion of Manipur. She is a divine feminine personification of death who carries off the souls of the dead to the underworld (Meitei: khamnung). If any soul will not go willingly, she either feeds it a magical fruit that makes it compliant or takes on the appearance of one of the soul's loved ones, especially that of its mother, and persuades it to accompany her. By one means or another, she takes every soul to the netherworld. She is the consort of Thongalel, the God of the death and the ruler of the underworld. She is said to have been created from the very body of Atingkok, the Supreme Being.

== See also ==
- Laikhurembi
