= Laikhurembi =

Goddess in Meitei mythology

- Queen of the Underworld, Goddess of argument, justice, good counsel, divine law, order, retribution and secrecy
- Member of Lairembis and Umang Lais
- Venerated in: Courts
- Affiliation: Sanamahism
- Major cult center: Uripok
- Texts: Poireiton Khunthok
- Gender: Female
- Region: Manipur
- Ethnic group: Meitei
- Festivals: Lai Haraoba

Genealogy
- Parents: Lai-ren Humchouba (father)
- Consort: Thongalen

Equivalents
- Greek: Themis, Dike
- Roman: Justitia

Laikhurembi is a goddess in Sanamahism, the indigenous religion of Manipur. She is the goddess of justice, good counsel, divine law, order and secrecy. She is the chief Queen of God Thongaren (Old Manipuri: Thongalen). She is the daughter of Lairen Humchouba. She is one of the divine incarnations of Leimarel Sidabi. She is one of the most important Umang Lais. Her pantheon is maintained particularly by the Taibungjam clan of Meitei ethnicity.

== History and Origin ==
According to the Poireiton Khunthok, Laikhurembi (Old Manipuri: Laikhulempi) was the chief queen of Thongaren (Old Manipuri: Thongalen). This book talks about her body in ways that show her personality. They say she had a wide mouth, which means she was loud or boastful. They say she had small breasts, which meant she used her heart less than she used her head; she was a thinking person and not a feeling person. They say she had sideways eyes, meaning she did not look at people straight on.

Laikhurembi is the daughter of Lai-ren (Chief of Lai) Humchouba.

Queen Laikhurembi was the first wife of King Thongaren. Then king asked her to marry his younger brother, Poireiton, instead, because Poireiton's wife had died. Poireiton was beginning a journey to Tai Pang Pan (an old name for Manipur) and King Thongalel thought it would not be good for Poireiton to go without a wife. However, Laikhurembi did not want to go. Trees had already been planted to honor her as the King's wife. Instead of Laikhurembi, Thongalel sent his second wife Leinaotabi.

== Description ==
The Goddess Laikhurembi had special powers. She was yungyatnaba (lit. erect and sharp) which meant she could see objects accurately no matter how far away they were. She could look at a person and see who he or she truly was inside. When she made a judgement, she would announce her verdict wisely, and give people their just rewards.

No one could find the Goddess Laikhurembi unless she wanted them to find her. No matter how hard a person would look, she could hide and stay hidden.

== Cult ==
There is a temple dedicated to Goddess Laikhurembi in Uripok town in Imphal West district. During the Lai Haraoba festival of Uripok, a carnival-like atmosphere accompanies the traditional, sacred rituals. During the noisy, festive occasion, maibis dance to the gentle music of the pena. The maibis became possessed by the spirits when the music stops andact as oracles.

== See also ==
- Yumjao Leima
