= List of Khuman and Luwang common ancestral monarchs =

Genealogy of ancient monarchs

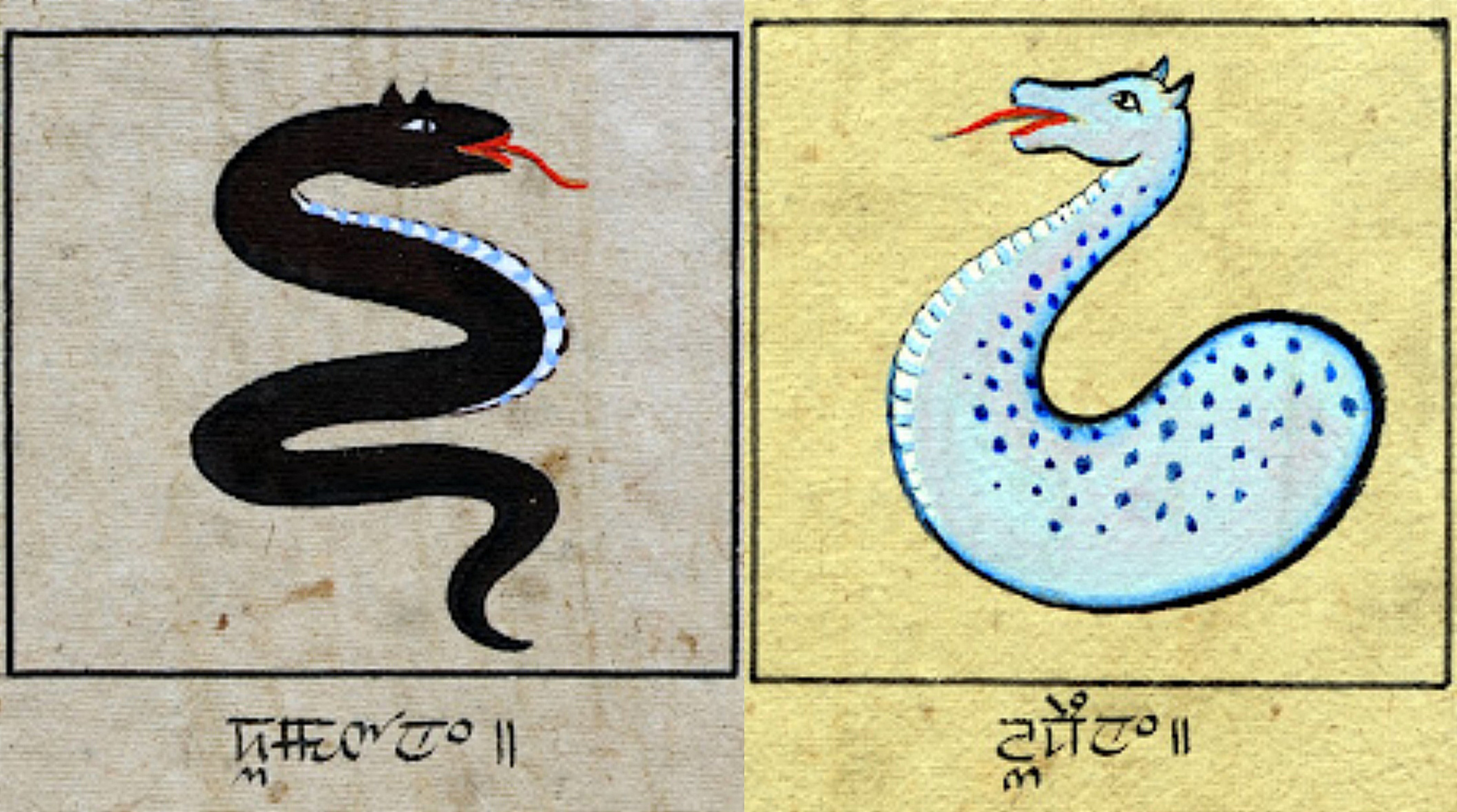
Holy and sacred totems of the Khuman & Luwang groups of the Meitei ethnicity of Ancient Kangleipak civilisation

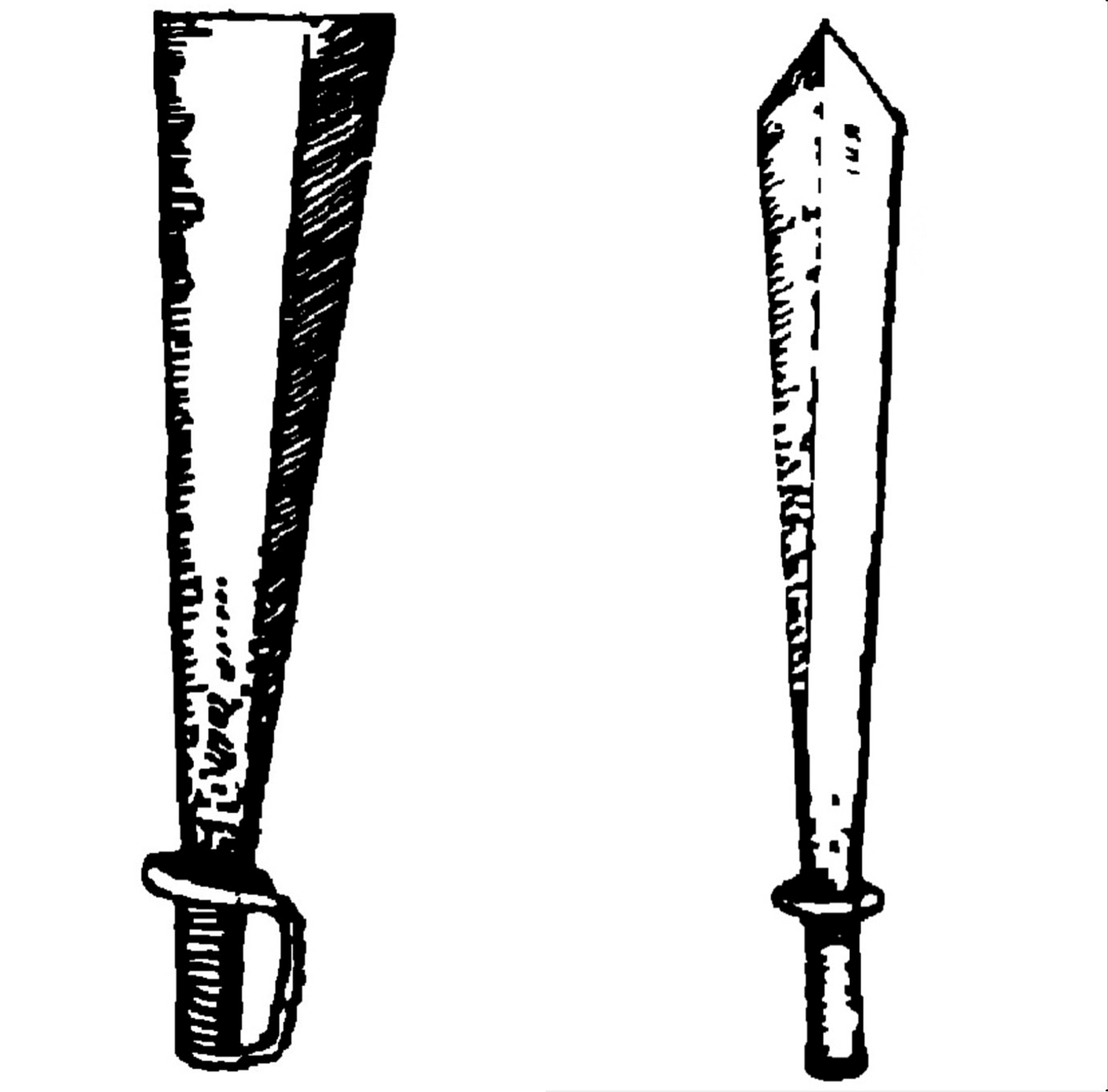
Dynastic swords of the Khumans (left) & the Luwangs (right) of Ancient Kangleipak civilisation

According to the Khuman Kangleirol, (Note: written in native Meitei script as ꯈꯨꯃꯟ ꯀꯪꯂꯩꯔꯣꯜ; also spelled as the Khuman Kangleiron (ꯈꯨꯃꯟ ꯀꯪꯂꯩꯔꯣꯟ)) the ruling lineages of the Khuman and Luwang dynasties are recorded as having a common origin. This shared ancestry may not necessarily extend to the broader populations associated with these dynasties. King Singtangpung Tapung Singminnapa, the ninth and final ruler of the common ancestral Khuman-Luwang royal lineage, had two successor sons, King Aalong, (Note: also known as Aarong (ꯑꯥꯔꯣꯡ)) who founded the independent Khuman dynasty, and King Pamingnapa, (Note: also known as Pamingnaba (ꯄꯥꯃꯤꯡꯅꯕ / ꯄꯥꯃꯤꯡꯅꯕꯥ)) who established the independent Luwang dynasty.

== Background ==
The Khuman (ꯈꯨꯃꯟ) and Luwang (ꯂꯨꯋꯥꯡ) communities are two of the seven sub-ethnic groups traditionally recognized within the Meitei ethnicity (also known as the Manipuris). Collectively, these groups are referred to as the "seven clans" or 7 Yek Salai.

In Meitei mythology, religion, and traditions, all seven clans are said to originate from a common divine ancestor named Pakhangba. From a historical perspective, the seven clans appear to have existed as distinct ethnic groups, each with separate origins. Despite their differences, they shared a common linguistic base (with regional dialectal variations) and practiced a shared religion (with sectarian differences). These similarities are likely due to prolonged cohabitation in the same geographical region—historically referred to as Kangleipak. Each group had its own rulers and independent polities. Over time, these groups were politically unified under the Ningthouja dynasty, forming what is now recognized as the Meitei ethnicity.

As with most ethnographic histories, the origins of populations are complex and multifaceted. It cannot be assumed that all individuals within a particular group share a single origin. Similarly, the ancestry of ruling elites may not align with that of the general population. This applies to both the Khuman and Luwang groups.

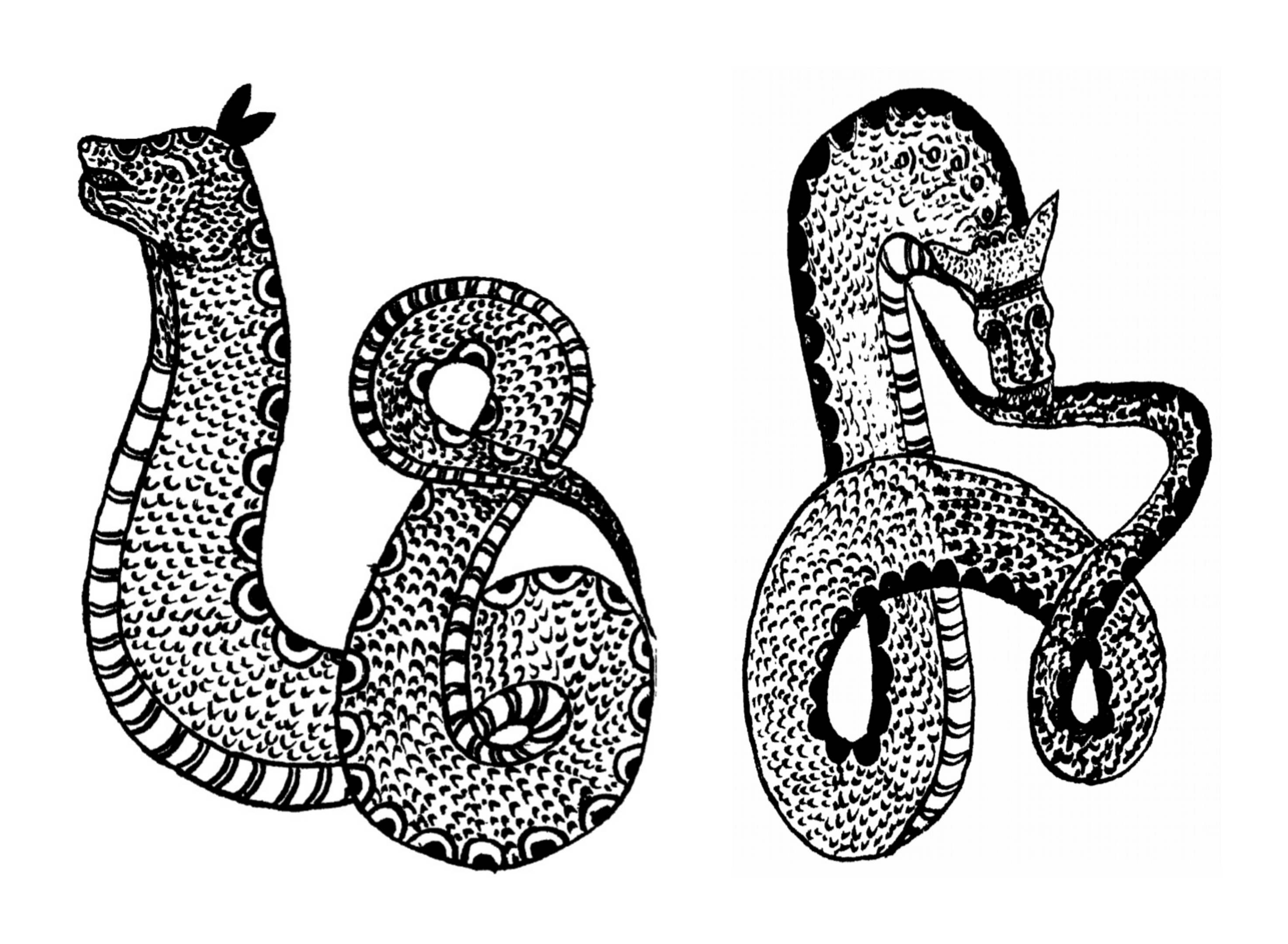
Holy & sacred totemic Meitei dragons of the Khumans (left) & the Luwangs (right) of Ancient Kangleipak civilization

== List of kings ==
The following provides a list of the kings from the period before the division of the Khuman and Luwang dynasties into distinct royal lineages.

Ancient Meitei name(s)	Latin transliteration	Alternative spelling(s) (if any)	Latin transliteration	Modernized Meitei name(s)	Latin transliteration	Alternative spelling(s) (if any)	Latin transliteration	Note(s)
ꯅꯣꯡꯇꯝꯂꯦꯟ ꯑꯈꯨꯄ / ꯅꯣꯪꯇꯝꯂꯦꯟ ꯑꯈꯨꯄꯥ	Nongtamlen Akhupa / Nongtamlen Akhoopa	ꯅꯣꯡꯇꯝꯂꯦꯜ ꯑꯈꯨꯄ / ꯅꯣꯪꯇꯝꯂꯦꯜ ꯑꯈꯨꯄꯥ	Nongtamlel Akhupa / Nongtamlel Akhoopa	ꯅꯣꯡꯗꯝꯂꯦꯟ ꯑꯈꯨꯕ / ꯅꯣꯪꯗꯝꯂꯦꯟ ꯑꯈꯨꯕꯥ	Nongdamlen Akhuba / Nongdamlen Akhooba	ꯅꯣꯡꯗꯝꯂꯦꯜ ꯑꯈꯨꯕ / ꯅꯣꯪꯗꯝꯂꯦꯜ ꯑꯈꯨꯕꯥ	Nongdamlel Akhuba / Nongdamlel Akhooba	First ruler of the Khuman-Luwang common royal lineage
ꯅꯣꯡꯇꯝꯂꯦꯟ ꯑꯍꯟꯄ / ꯅꯣꯪꯇꯝꯂꯦꯟ ꯑꯍꯟꯄꯥ	Nongtamlen Ahanpa	ꯅꯣꯡꯇꯝꯂꯦꯜ ꯑꯍꯟꯄ / ꯅꯣꯪꯇꯝꯂꯦꯜ ꯑꯍꯟꯄꯥ	Nongtamlel Ahanpa	ꯅꯣꯡꯗꯝꯂꯦꯟ ꯑꯍꯟꯕ / ꯅꯣꯪꯗꯝꯂꯦꯟ ꯑꯍꯟꯕꯥ	Nongdamlen Ahanba	ꯅꯣꯡꯗꯝꯂꯦꯜ ꯑꯍꯟꯕ / ꯅꯣꯪꯗꯝꯂꯦꯜ ꯑꯍꯟꯕꯥ	Nongdamlel Ahanba	Second ruler of the Khuman-Luwang common royal lineage
ꯀꯨꯂꯨꯝꯂꯦꯟ ꯃꯩꯅꯥꯏꯇꯄ / ꯀꯨꯂꯨꯝꯂꯦꯟ ꯃꯩꯅꯥꯏꯇꯄꯥ	Kulumlen Meinaitapa	ꯀꯨꯂꯨꯝꯂꯦꯜ ꯃꯩꯅꯥꯏꯇꯄ / ꯀꯨꯂꯨꯝꯂꯦꯜ ꯃꯩꯅꯥꯏꯇꯄꯥ	Kulumlel Meinaitapa	ꯀꯨꯔꯨꯝꯂꯦꯟ ꯃꯩꯅꯥꯏꯗꯕ / ꯀꯨꯔꯨꯝꯂꯦꯟ ꯃꯩꯅꯥꯏꯗꯕꯥ	Kurumlen Meinaidaba	ꯀꯨꯔꯨꯝꯂꯦꯜ ꯃꯩꯅꯥꯏꯗꯕ / ꯀꯨꯔꯨꯝꯂꯦꯜ ꯃꯩꯅꯥꯏꯗꯕꯥ	Kurumlel Meinaidaba	Third ruler of the Khuman-Luwang common royal lineage
ꯀꯨꯂꯨꯝꯂꯦꯟ ꯃꯩꯅꯥꯏꯄ / ꯀꯨꯂꯨꯝꯂꯦꯟ ꯃꯩꯅꯥꯏꯄꯥ	Kulumlen Meinaipa	ꯀꯨꯂꯨꯝꯂꯦꯜ ꯃꯩꯅꯥꯏꯄ / ꯀꯨꯂꯨꯝꯂꯦꯜ ꯃꯩꯅꯥꯏꯄꯥ	Kulumlel Meinaipa	ꯀꯨꯔꯨꯝꯂꯦꯟ ꯃꯩꯅꯥꯏꯕ / ꯀꯨꯔꯨꯝꯂꯦꯟ ꯃꯩꯅꯥꯏꯕꯥ	Kurumlen Meinaiba	ꯀꯨꯔꯨꯝꯂꯦꯜ ꯃꯩꯅꯥꯏꯕ / ꯀꯨꯔꯨꯝꯂꯦꯜ ꯃꯩꯅꯥꯏꯕꯥ	Kurumlel Meinaiba	Fourth ruler of the Khuman-Luwang common royal lineage
ꯄꯣꯊꯥꯡ ꯄꯣꯡꯍꯟ / ꯄꯣꯊꯥꯪ ꯄꯣꯪꯍꯟ	Pothang Ponghan	ꯄꯣꯊꯥꯡ ꯄꯣꯡꯍꯜ / ꯄꯣꯊꯥꯪ ꯄꯣꯪꯍꯜ	Pothang Ponghal					Fifth ruler of the Khuman-Luwang common royal lineage
ꯍꯩꯂꯣꯡꯂꯦꯟ ꯂꯣꯡꯆꯨꯝꯄ / ꯍꯩꯂꯣꯡꯂꯦꯟ ꯂꯣꯡꯆꯨꯝꯄꯥ	Heilonglen Longchumpa	ꯍꯩꯂꯣꯡꯂꯦꯜ ꯂꯣꯡꯆꯨꯝꯄ / ꯍꯩꯂꯣꯡꯂꯦꯜ ꯂꯣꯡꯆꯨꯝꯄꯥ	Heilonglel Longchumpa	ꯍꯩꯔꯣꯡꯂꯦꯟ ꯂꯣꯡꯖꯨꯝꯕ / ꯍꯩꯔꯣꯡꯂꯦꯟ ꯂꯣꯡꯖꯨꯝꯕꯥ	Heironglen Longjumba	ꯍꯩꯔꯣꯡꯂꯦꯜ ꯂꯣꯡꯖꯨꯝꯕ / ꯍꯩꯔꯣꯡꯂꯦꯜ ꯂꯣꯡꯖꯨꯝꯕꯥ	Heironglel Longjumba	Sixth ruler of the Khuman-Luwang common royal lineage
ꯍꯩꯂꯣꯡꯉꯥꯡ ꯊꯥꯉꯥꯡꯂꯦꯟ	Heilong-ngang Thanganglen / Heilongngang Thanganglen / Heilongang Thanganglen	ꯍꯩꯂꯣꯡꯉꯥꯡ ꯊꯥꯉꯥꯡꯂꯦꯜ	Heilong-ngang Thanganglel / Heilongngang Thanganglel / Heilongang Thanganglel	ꯍꯩꯔꯣꯡꯉꯥꯡ ꯊꯥꯉꯥꯡꯂꯦꯟ	Heirong-ngang Thanganglen / Heirongngang Thanganglen / Heirongang Thanganglen	ꯍꯩꯔꯣꯡꯉꯥꯡ ꯊꯥꯉꯥꯡꯂꯦꯜ	Heirong-ngang Thanganglel / Heirongngang Thanganglel / Heirongang Thanganglel	Seventh ruler of the Khuman-Luwang common royal lineage
ꯄꯣꯏꯂꯩꯇꯣꯟ	Poileiton	ꯄꯣꯏꯂꯩꯇꯣꯜ	Poileitol	ꯄꯣꯏꯔꯩꯇꯣꯟ	Poireiton	ꯄꯣꯏꯔꯩꯇꯣꯜ	Poireitol	Eighth ruler of the Khuman-Luwang common royal lineage
ꯁꯤꯡꯇꯥꯡꯄꯨꯡ ꯇꯥꯄꯨꯡ ꯁꯤꯡꯃꯤꯟꯅꯄ / ꯁꯤꯡꯇꯥꯪꯄꯨꯪ ꯇꯥꯄꯨꯪ ꯁꯤꯡꯃꯤꯟꯅꯄꯥ	Singtangpung Tapung Singminnapa / Shingtangpung Tapung Shingminnapa	ꯁꯤꯡꯇꯥꯡꯄꯨꯡ ꯇꯥꯄꯨꯡ ꯁꯤꯡꯃꯤꯅꯄ / ꯁꯤꯡꯇꯥꯪꯄꯨꯪ ꯇꯥꯄꯨꯪ ꯁꯤꯡꯃꯤꯅꯄꯥ	Singtangpung Tapung Singminapa / Shingtangpung Tapung Shingminapa	ꯁꯤꯡꯗꯥꯡꯄꯨꯡ ꯇꯥꯕꯨꯡ ꯁꯤꯡꯃꯤꯟꯅꯕ / ꯁꯤꯡꯗꯥꯪꯄꯨꯪ ꯇꯥꯕꯨꯪ ꯁꯤꯡꯃꯤꯟꯅꯕꯥ	Singdangpung Tabung Singminnaba / Shingdangpung Tabung Shingminnaba	ꯁꯤꯡꯗꯥꯡꯄꯨꯡ ꯇꯥꯕꯨꯡ ꯁꯤꯡꯃꯤꯅꯕ / ꯁꯤꯡꯗꯥꯪꯄꯨꯪ ꯇꯥꯕꯨꯪ ꯁꯤꯡꯃꯤꯅꯕꯥ	Singdangpung Tabung Singminaba / Shingdangpung Tabung Shingminaba	Ninth and the last ruler of the Khuman-Luwang common royal lineage; had two sons: Aalong (ꯑꯥꯂꯣꯡ), also called Aarong (ꯑꯥꯔꯣꯡ), and Pamingnapa (ꯄꯥꯃꯤꯡꯅꯄ / ꯄꯥꯃꯤꯡꯅꯄꯥ), also called Pamingnaba (ꯄꯥꯃꯤꯡꯅꯕ / ꯄꯥꯃꯤꯡꯅꯕꯥ). Both became kings. King Aalong started the Khuman dynasty. King Pamingnapa started the Luwang dynasty.

== List of queens ==
The following provides a list of the queens from the period before the division of the Khuman and Luwang dynasties into distinct royal lineages.

- Queen Mother Chinphuron Leichik Nganbi - Queen Mother of Nongdamlen Akhuba, the first king of the Khuman-Luwang common royal lineage
- Queen Leithamlen Chanu (ꯂꯩꯊꯝꯂꯦꯟ ꯆꯅꯨ) - consort of King Nongdamlen Akhuba, the first ruler of the Khuman-Luwang common royal lineage, and queen mother of King Nongdamlen Ahanba
- Queen Chitnu Leima (ꯆꯤꯠꯅꯨ ꯂꯩꯃꯥ) - consort of King Nongdamlen Ahanba, the second ruler of the Khuman-Luwang common royal lineage, and queen mother of King Kurumlen Meinaidaba
- Queen Hainu Leima (ꯍꯥꯏꯅꯨ ꯂꯩꯃ) - consort of King Kurumlen Meinaidaba, the third ruler of the Khuman-Luwang common royal lineage, and queen mother of King Kurumlen Meinaiba
- Queen Leiphulen Chanu (ꯂꯩꯐꯨꯂꯦꯟ ꯆꯅꯨ), also known as Leiphuren Chanu (ꯂꯩꯐꯨꯔꯦꯟ ꯆꯅꯨ) - consort of King Kurumlen Meinaiba, the fourth ruler of the Khuman-Luwang common royal lineage, and queen mother of King Pothang Ponghan
- Queen Pisinnu, also known as Pishinnu (ꯄꯤꯁꯤꯟꯅꯨ) - consort of King Pothang Ponghan, the fifth ruler of the Khuman-Luwang common royal lineage, and queen mother of King Heironglen Longjumba
- Queen Pisinnukhompi, also known as Pishinnukhompi (ꯄꯤꯁꯤꯟꯅꯨꯈꯣꯝꯄꯤ), or Pisinnukhombi or Pishinnukhombi (ꯄꯤꯁꯤꯟꯅꯨꯈꯣꯝꯕꯤ) - consort of King Heironglen Longjumba, the sixth ruler of the Khuman-Luwang common royal lineage, and queen mother of King Heirong-ngang Thanganglen
- Queen Piyainu (ꯄꯤꯌꯥꯏꯅꯨ) - consort of King Heirong-ngang Thanganglen, the seventh ruler of the Khuman-Luwang common royal lineage, and queen mother of two sons, King Thawalen (ꯊꯋꯥꯂꯦꯟ), also known as Thawaren (ꯊꯋꯥꯔꯦꯟ), who ruled the ancestral kingdom, and King Poireiton (ꯄꯣꯏꯔꯩꯇꯣꯟ), who established his own kingdom in Kangleipak.
- Queen Leima Leinaotabi (ꯂꯩꯅꯥꯑꯣꯇꯥꯕꯤ), also known as Leinautabi (ꯂꯩꯅꯥꯎꯇꯥꯕꯤ) - consort of King Poireiton, the eighth ruler of the Khuman-Luwang common royal lineage, and queen mother of King Singtangpung Tapung Singminnapa
- Queen Santhong Punempa Chanu (ꯁꯟꯊꯣꯡ ꯄꯨꯅꯦꯝꯄ ꯆꯅꯨ), also known as Shanthong Punemba Chanu (ꯁꯟꯊꯣꯡ ꯄꯨꯅꯦꯝꯕ ꯆꯅꯨ) - consort of King Singtangpung Tapung Singminnapa, the ninth ruler of the Khuman-Luwang common royal lineage, and queen mother of two sons, King Aalong (ꯑꯥꯂꯣꯡ), also known as Aarong (ꯑꯥꯔꯣꯡ), who founded the independent Khuman dynasty, and King Pamingnapa (ꯄꯥꯃꯤꯡꯅꯄ / ꯄꯥꯃꯤꯡꯅꯄꯥ), also known as Pamingnaba (ꯄꯥꯃꯤꯡꯅꯕ / ꯄꯥꯃꯤꯡꯅꯕꯥ), who founded the independent Luwang dynasty.

== See also ==
- Poireiton Khunthok
- Nongda Lairen Pakhangba
- Meitei deities
- Mangang Luwang Khuman
- Lai Haraoba

== Bibliography ==
- Yek Taretkee Ningthourol, by Sudhir, Angom
- Khuman Sheirol
- খুমন্ নিংথৌরোন লম্বুবা, by Brahmacharimayum Kulachandra Sharma
