= Khongjomnubi Nonggarol =

Ancient Meitei literary narrative work

- Language: Meitei language
- Genre: Meitei literature, Meitei mythology and Meitei religion
- Publication place: Ancient Kangleipak

The Khongjomnubi Nonggarol (Ancient Meitei: Khongchomnupi Nongkalol) is an ancient Meitei language literary narrative text (puya) containing two major stories, first about a group of six Luwang girls turning into the pleiades in the sky, one of them giving birth to a harinongnang (Meitei for 'cicada') and the second about a lady named Haosi Namoinu turning a harinongnang, unable to suffer the extreme cruelty of her stepmother, during her father's absence.

== Etymology ==
"Khongjomnubi" or "Khongchomnupi" means the Pleiades and "Nongarol" or "Nongkalol" means the ascend to the Heaven.

== Stories ==
=== 1st story ===
Once six Luwang ladies went to buy fish attempting to have a good bargain at a fishing weir maintained by six tribal men. They got familiar to one another soon after they saw one another. As there was no enough catch on that particular evening, the youths requested to the Luwang girls to spend the night in the open shed together with them so that they might take away the fish the next day. The girls, at first, were reluctant to accept the proposal due to their fear of their parents and brothers. However, on the persist request of the men, they agreed. Thus they stayed together in the dark with the men, elated with the passion of life, soon gave themselves to one another up to fulfill the desires of flesh. On the next day, the ladies felt shy to go home and to meet their families. So, the men proposed that if their parents were harsh on them, they would ascend heaven together. In that case, they planned to meet one another after five days at a place called Tentongyan where once Luwang Ningthou Punshiba, king of the Luwang dynasty, hung his royal bow and arrows, on the crooked tree branch.

Everything happened just like expected. The ladies were badly treated by their mothers at home, scolding and beating them for committing the sins of physical relationship before marriage and that too with men of community that was socially inferior to theirs. Getting embarrassed, the ladies left their homes before the stipulated number of days planned. They actually ran out and traced their way towards the abode of Salailen Sidaba, god of heaven. A strange thing happened on the way as one of the girls went into labour and gave birth to a harinongnang (Meitei for 'cicada') instead of a human child. She left the creature on earth, behind their way, with assuring the baby that she would visit it once a year. Then, the birth giving lady followed her group of companions, who rested at every point of ridges, waiting for her. When they reached the abode of Salailen, they admitted and fell before Him honestly with their distress for searching an accommodation. Salailen felt pity for them and soon they were joined by the tribal men, their lovers, in the spot. Salailen warned them that in heaven, no mortal could enjoy earthly love or have menage a trois. He granted them a chance to go to earth once a year, lead conjugal life and take care of their child (the cicada). Hence, the six young couples lived an eternal life of happiness.

=== 2nd story ===
The text has its another story, which is about how lady Haosi Namoinu turned into a harinongnang (Meitei for 'cicada').

The following is a passage from the text describing the pitiable extreme troubles of lady Haosi Namoinu suffering the cruelty of her selfish stepmother:

“One day Hāosināmoinu tenderly told her step-mother Lousikām Chanu that that day she and her companions of equal age and similar haircut had decided to have among themselves a match of kang. So she requested to allow her fetch the basketful load of paddy from the distant barn the next morning when the sun just shoots up with his brilliant rays, which the ill-natured and acid-tongued step-mother did not take kindly, and fiercely insisted on carrying out the task as enjoined. There was no means of escape for the poor girl, but on her return hardly had she stepped into the house and unloaded the heavy weight, when the termagant woman, always disquieting like boiling water, again bade her to perform household chores like husking the paddy with the pestle on the mortar and toil for fine grained rice. Unable to bear any further, the hapless girl made a retort against her saucy step-mother who, instantly flying into a rage, hit her head with a laddle. Then blood profusely rushed out of it.”

— Khongjomnubi Nonggarol

== See also ==
- Animals in Meitei culture
- Birds in Meitei culture
- Hills and mountains in Meitei culture
- List of Meitei folktales
- Plants in Meitei culture
