= Chothe Thangwai Pakhangba =

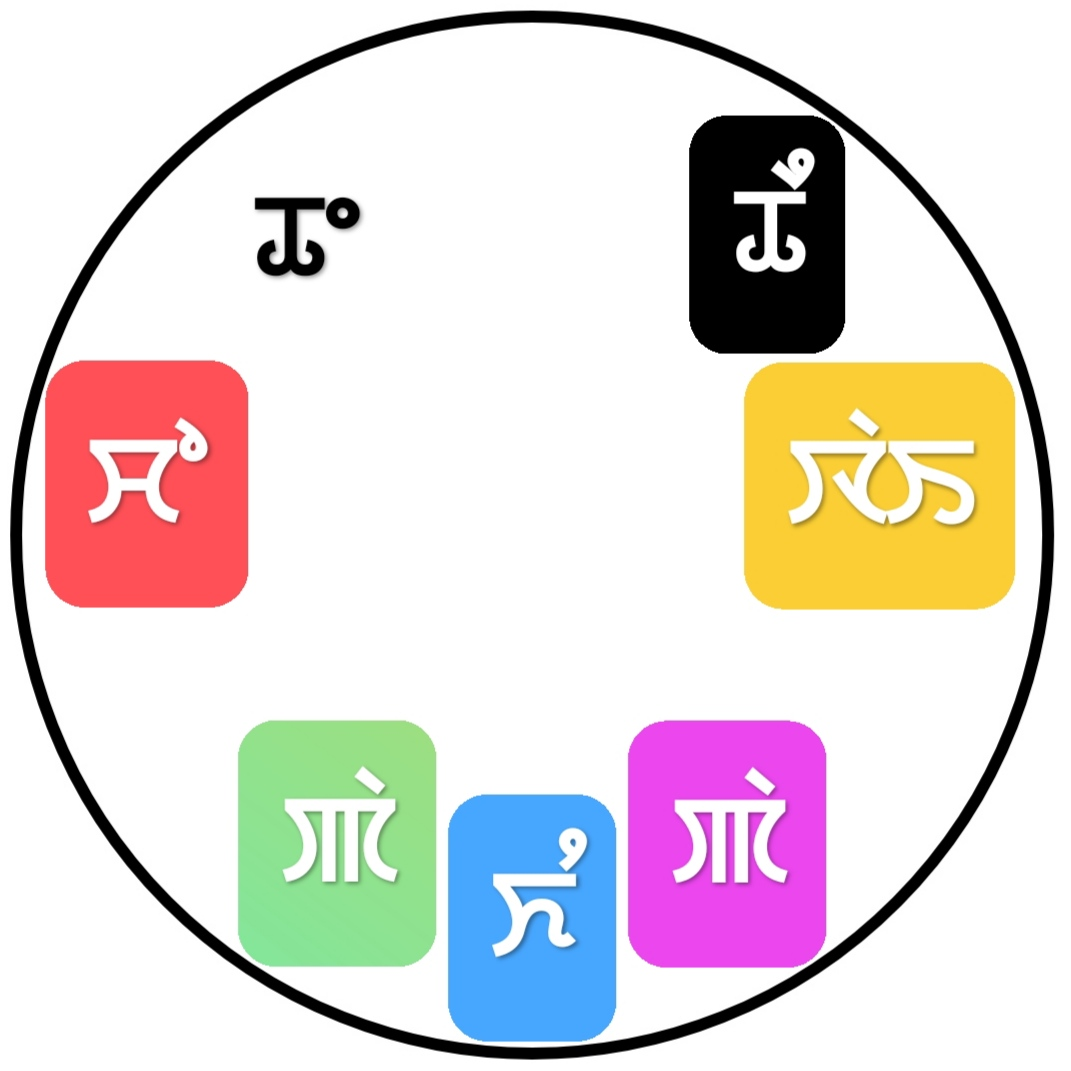

The Chothe Thangwai Pakhangba (ꯆꯣꯊꯦ ꯊꯪꯋꯥꯏ ꯄꯥꯈꯪꯕ) is an 18th-century classical Meitei language literary work. The author addresses Vaisnava Thongnang Maya, who is identified as Meitei King Garibniwaj. The story is a rare example of conjugal love in the ancient Moirang region and can be seen as the reverse of Nungpan Ponpi Luwaopa.

== Birth and divine instruction ==
Thangwai Koting Ahanba was the king of Moirang, and Leima Thammoilengpi was his queen. She became happy when she was pregnant, but the child was lost through a natural abortion. Soraren, the god of heaven, restored the child to her womb with instructions that he should be born as her son but should not live long enough to reach any rite of passage.

Five months later, Soraren appeared in her dream, telling her that the child she carried was His own. He instructed that the child should not be given any ordinary food or drink. After the child was born, the god appeared again, revealed His connection to the child, and named him Chothe Thangwai Pakhangba.

== Early life and marriage ==
Chothe Thangwai Pakhangba grew into a strong and graceful youth. His parents had forgotten the divine instructions. One day, he saw Sunulembi, daughter of Thongnang Loikemba of Cachari origin, and immediately fell in love with her. They were formally engaged and married in a grand ceremony.

== Divine intervention ==
Soraren reminded Chothe Thangwai Pakhangba in a dream of the instructions given to his parents. When Sunulembi saw him in tears, he explained that he had to leave within five days. The next morning, this was told to his parents, friends, and relatives. On the appointed day, Chothe Thangwai Pakhangba, dressed in his best clothes with Sunulembi's help, prepared for the heavenly journey. Sunulembi insisted on accompanying him. They ascended towards the sky, observed by people below.

== Trials on the journey ==
The couple faced several obstacles on their way to the abode of Soraren:

1. Flooded Sphere: The heavenly gate initially allowed only the husband to enter, but Sunulembi was later permitted.

2. Swarm of Snakes: Sunulembi was allowed to proceed after her husband pleaded with the snakes.

3. Access to Heaven: Soraren forbade the couple from staying together in heaven. He told Sunulembi to return to earth and feed her husband with heavenly food.

Sunulembi refused, threatening to die from thirst and starvation if separated. Soraren sent dangers including a wild boar, a tiger, a flood, fire, and a hill-kite, but she remained unafraid.

== Reunion and return ==
Moved by Sunulembi's devotion, Soraren allowed her to keep her husband. He also gave Chothe Thangwai Pakhangba the sceptre of Moirang and blessed him with a long and prosperous reign. The couple returned to earth alive and joyful, and the people of Moirang welcomed them, immediately making Chothe Thangwai Pakhangba king.

== Themes and significance ==
The story combines fantasy with elements of realism, reflecting Moirang society of the time. Chothe Thangwai Pakhangba’s approach to love involved persuasion through friends and family rather than direct courtship. Sunulembi is portrayed as beautiful, calm, composed, and steadfast in love. Her courage and devotion are central to the story, and she is depicted as a figure comparable to legendary characters such as Savitri and Orpheus.

== See also ==
- Nungpan Ponpi Luwaopa
- Henjunaha
- Savitri and Satyavan
- Pativrata
- Orpheus and Eurydice
- Izanami and Izanagi
