= Nungpan Ponpi Luwaopa =

Ancient Meitei language text

Nūngpān Ponpī Lūwāopa
- Language: Meitei language
- Subject: Meitei literature
- Genre: Meitei folklore, Meitei mythology, Meitei religion
- Publication place: Ancient Kangleipak (early Manipur)
- Media type: book
- The major characters in the story are: Prince Nungpan Ponpi Luwaopa of Luwang dynasty; Princess Koubaron Namoinu; King Koupalu (Koubru); King Thongalen; Thongalen's first brother; Thongalen's second brother

The Nūngpān Ponpī Lūwāopa (Meitei: ꯅꯨꯡꯄꯥꯟ ꯄꯣꯟꯄꯤ ꯂꯨꯋꯥꯎꯄ) is an ancient Meitei language narrative text (puya), about the legendary story of the eponymous prince of the Luwang, who got back successfully the life of his wife Koubaron Namoinu, from the hands of her former consort Thongalen, the God of death and the ruler of the underworld. It is an old story of near tragic end. In the legend, there are fights between a mortal and the gods. It mentions about the dowry system (Meitei: Awonpot) of the then ancient times. It is, in a sense, the reverse of the Chothe Thangwai Pakhangba.

== Introduction ==
The introduction deals with the mythology of creation to relate the Luwang dynasty prince and the Koubru princess to divine origins. The weird events of the death and then the revival of princess Namoinu are magical. The appearance of divine personalities in human forms shows the imaginative for any serious estimation of the story by the author.

== Story ==
It is a story of love fulfilled after a near tragic event and is, perhaps, unique of its kind. Nungpan Ponpi Luwaopa (Meitei: ꯅꯨꯡꯄꯥꯟ ꯄꯣꯟꯄꯤ ꯂꯨꯋꯥꯎꯄ, romanized: Nūng-pān Pon-pī Lū-wāo-pa), also known as Nungban Pombi Luwaoba (Meitei: ꯅꯨꯡꯕꯥꯟ ꯄꯣꯝꯕꯤ ꯂꯨꯋꯥꯎꯕ, romanized: Nung-bān Pom-bī Lū-wāo-ba) (the word Nongban denotes the Angom Clan of Meitei, while Nungban denotes the Luwang Clan of Meitei), the leading character of the same name was a Prince of the Luwang dynasty born of King Nungpan Pamingnapa and Queen Santhong Huimuleima. He soon grew into manhood and felt lovesick. He set out alone to cover the wide world in search of a love to quench the thirst of his heart and was welcomed by the King Koubru when he approached him for a rest. There he met the princess, Koubaron Namoinu (Lainaotabi) and was instantly smitten with her beauty and had his heart lost to her. The princess, formerly the youngest wife of Thongalel, the God of death, who while accompanying her younger brother in law on a sojourn to earth got separated from him and was later adopted by the king as his daughter. Returning home hastily, the prince requested his parents to get the princess engaged to him. And this was carried out without delay with the offer of choice and the delicious fruit in prickles to the king and the queen. The couple accepted the proposal with a good grace and regarded it as an occasion ordained by Providence. The marriage having been performed with due solemnity, the young couple began to lead a happy and contented life. But this was destined not to last long, for the God did not take kindly to his own wife spending her days as an ordinary mortal in the company of another man. So, her fatal thread was cut short and her soul recalled. However, the distraught Prince did not take his tragic fate lying down and taking the help of Nongta Chinkhanyang, a pheasant, sent a request to the Lord of the netherworld to give back the soul of his wife or take the challenge of a single combat.

Thus, he kept guarding the mortal remains of Koubaron Namoinu without the obsequies being performed. Thongalel first sent his younger brother armed with deadly weapons for the fight in which the prince settled his opponent's hash and kept him bound under the heavy weight of a slab. The Lord's second brother too met the same humiliation and at last, Thongalel himself appeared in all splendor in the field of honour. But the prince was prudent enough to realise that he was no match for powerful God, he fell prostrate before him and begged mercy and kindness to restore Koubaron Namoinu to him so that the Luwang dynasty might have further progeny. Thongalel, being visibly moved, readily granted the prayer and left for the dark abode. Thus, the couple were united to live for another hundred years with conjugal bliss and Luwang Ningthou Punshiba, a son was born to them.

== Epic battle between gods and a mortal ==
The text quotes the fighting words exchanged between Luwang prince Luwaopa and the divine brothers of Lord Thongalen in a dramatic manner. A few notable lines about the climax of the event are quoted as follows:

Luwaopa: “Who are you waging battle against the formidable Nungpan Ponpi Luwaopa?”

Thongngak Lakapa: “You, abductor of other man's wife, I am the younger brother of Thongaren, king of the dead. How dare you keep my brother in captivity? Set him free at once. This very day, my elder brother the Lord has commanded me to seize and bring you before him dragged by the hair.”

Luwaopa: “Your brother is now my captive. If the soul of my beloved is not given back, he shall be buried alive as a part of her funeral rites. Today I am determined on making another of you for the same purpose. If I fail, there shall be Providential judgement.”

=== First fight : First younger brother of Thongalen vs Luwaopa ===
The first younger brother of Thongalen was equipped with extraordinary weapons. The arms are a broad fieldstone is the shield, the lightning that flashes in the sky and which is the inseparable protective dart of the mother earth (here, she is Leimarel Sidabi) is his spear, the sword to be tucked in at the loin cloth is the one that shines like a burning flame.

Luwaopa outwitted the divine brother by proposing him to wrestle with bare hands. The reason and the logic was that he was fully aware of the invincibility of the elemental weapons held by the divine opponent.

=== Second fight : Second younger brother of Thongalen vs Luwaopa ===
Again, for the second brother of Thongalen, he was equipped with the dark cloud comes in for his shield, the sharp rain of a cloudburst for his spear and the sword is the one held by the Lord himself.

Luwaopa defeated the second brother too by outwitting him in the same manner like before.

== Analysis ==
The Luwang dynasty prince was yearning for love when he was growing into manhood. It remotely resembles Romeo's earlier romantic fancy for Rosaline in the play Romeo and Juliet of Shakespearean tragedy in English literature. The Koubru king's love for his daughter shows resemblance to that of Kanva for Shakuntala of Hindu mythology. The in-laws give indulgence to Koubru's only daughter's gentle hands in marriage. She was like a household craft as she was a pampered child in her family. Thongalen, the god of the dead too suddenly comes down to the mortal level when jealousy stirred His heart. He made the medicine-man to take out the soul of lady Namoinu. It was a difficult, unpleasant, and embarrassing situation for Thongalen as he was cleft-stick bound to agree the challenge of Luwaopa, the mortal prince of the Luwang dynasty. Thongalen was in a malleable condition when his opponent Luwang prince vowed down before him with faithful love, respect and helplessness.

== See also ==
- Tharon
- Panthoibi Khonggul
- Khongjomnubi Nonggarol
- Henjunaha and Lairoulembi
- Orpheus and Eurydice
- Izanagi and Izanami
