= Poireiton Khunthok =

Ancient Meitei literary narrative work

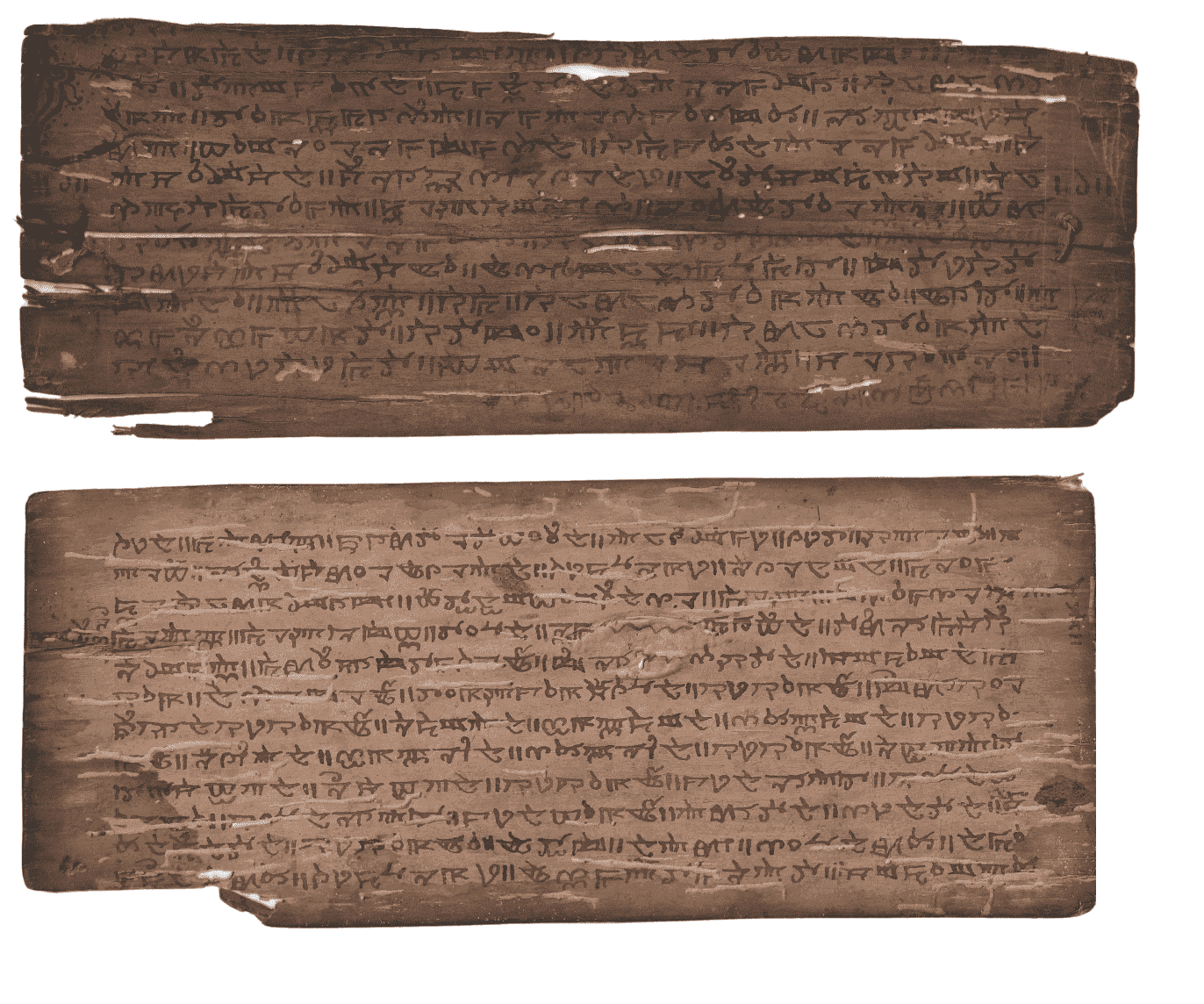
A 1777 CE manuscript textual copy of the Poireiton Khunthok, an Ancient Meitei language classical epic, in traditional Meetei Mayek script

Poireiton Khunthok (Meitei: ꯄꯣꯢꯔꯩꯇꯣꯟ ꯈꯨꯟꯊꯣꯛ, lit. 'The Immigration of Poireiton') is an ancient Meitei puya, or narrative work describing about the immigration of a band of colonists, led by a man, Poireiton, a prince and younger brother of Thongalen, the god of the underworld, in the plains of the Kangleipak (present day Manipur).

It is partially an allegorical work, which includes mythical elements as the integral parts of the saga. Part of the lore is that the knowledge of how to use fire was introduced to the people of Kangleipak by Poireiton.

== See also ==
- Leithak Leikharol
