= Thongalen =

Ancient Meitei god of death

- King of the Underworld and God of the Dead
- Member of Lainingthous
- Abode: the Underworld
- Texts: Poireiton Khunthok, Nongban Pombi Luwaoba
- Gender: Male
- Region: Manipur
- Ethnic group: Meitei ethnicity
- Festivals: Lai Haraoba

Genealogy
- Siblings: Poireiton
- Consorts: Laikhurembi; Lainaotabi; Thongak Lairembi; Khamnung Kikoi Louonbi

Equivalents
- Greek: Hades
- Hindu: Yama
- Roman: Pluto

Thongalen (Meitei: ꯊꯣꯉꯥꯂꯦꯟ) (also, Thongalel, Thongaren or Thongarel) is the god of the dead and the king of the underworld (Meitei: ꯈꯝꯅꯨꯡ, romanized: Khamnung) in Meitei mythology and Sanamahism, the indigenous religion of Manipur. He is the Guardian God of the nadir.

He is the ancestor-god of the Khuman clan. Laikhurembi and Lainaotabi are his wives.

== Mythology ==
=== In the Poireiton Khunthok ===
King Thongaren (Old Manipuri: Thongalen) asked his highest-ranked Queen Laikhurembi (Old Manipuri: Laikhulempi) to go with his brother Chingkhong Poireiton on a long trip. Poireiton was a widower; his wife had died, and he had six children to raise and also had to go to the Tai Pang Pan. King Thongalel thought his brother needed a wife to go with him on their trip. However, Queen Laikhurembi did not want to go. She said she was already the king's wife. Trees had already been planted in her honor because she and the king had lived together for a very long time. So, instead of Queen Laikhurembi, King Thongalel sent his second wife, Leinaotabi, to go with Poireiton and be his wife.

=== In the Pombi Luwaoba ===
Nongban Pombi Luwaoba was a prince in the Luwang dynasty. Prince Nongban Pombi Luwaoba and his wife, Namoinu, were happy. Then she died suddenly. She died because of the God Thongalel. Prince Pombi Luwaoba refused to perform the funeral for her dead body. He hoped the God Thongalel would send her soul back into her body so she would be alive again. God Thongalel received a message from the prince through a pheasant bird. The message said that Prince Nongban Pombi Luwaoba was ready to fight God Thongalel if he did not send Namoinu's soul back. This made the God Thongalel angry. He sent two of his brothers, but Prince Nongban Pombi Luwaoba beat them both. He took them prisoner. Prince Nongban Pombi Luwaoba sent the pheasant bird with another message to God Thongalel. The message said that if the God wanted to get his brothers back alive, then he had to send back the soul of Namoinu to her body.

Finally, God Thongalel came to meet Prince Pombi Luwaoba himself. But instead of fighting, the prince prayed to the god himself. God Thongalel was happy that Prince Nongban Pombi Luwaoba showed him respect. Thongalel brought Namoinu back to life. He also gave her a gift: She would live for 100 years and have 100 sons.

== Hymns ==
The Meitei people in ancient times, worshipped the deity along with a hymn, which reads as follows:-

O Immortal Lord Thongalen!
Thou dispenser of the destiny of the dead and the living!
Skillful thou art in administration,
Favouring many a living being
Sealing the fate of many a dead man
Presidest thou over funeral affairs;
Chief of gods!
Shut the door of death
And open the door of the living!

— Ashee Thong Thingpa

== Texts ==
- According to ancient Meitei chronicle "Poireiton Khunthok", a band of colonists led by Poireiton came from the land of death, whose king was Lord Thongaren.
- According to ancient Meitei chronicle "Nongban Pombi Luwaoba", there was a conflict between Nongban Pombi Luwaoba and a messenger of Thongaren and subsequent reconciliation with Lord Thongaren himself.

== Association with other deities ==
God Thongalen is sometimes identified as God Wangpurel (Old Manipuri: Wangpulel). Thongalen is the King of underworld. Wangpurel reigns over the direction south. Some Meiteis believe that the direction south is the land of death. So, when the Meiteis got converted into Hinduism, both Thongalen and Wangpulel became counterparts of Hindu God Yama.

== See also ==
- Nongpok Ningthou
- Lainingthou Sanamahi
