= Poireiton =

Meitei folk hero

- Cultural hero of adventure, journey and fire
- Other names: Chingkhong Poireitol
- Meitei: (Meitei: ꯄꯣꯢꯔꯩꯇꯣꯟ)
- Affiliation: Sanamahism
- Abodes: Earth and Underworld
- World: Underworld
- Texts: Poireiton Khunthok
- Gender: Male
- Ethnic group: Meitei ethnicity

Genealogy
- Born: Underworld
- Siblings: Thongalel
- Consort: Lainaotabi

Equivalents
- Greek: Prometheus

Chingkhong Poireiton (Meitei: ꯆꯤꯡꯈꯣꯡ ꯄꯣꯢꯔꯩꯇꯣꯟ) is a prince of the Khamnung (underworld kingdom) and a younger brother of Thongaren, the god of death in Meitei mythology and Sanamahism, the indigenous religion of Manipur. He is best known as a cultural hero, for leading a colonial immigration to the human world. He is mentioned in the Poireiton Khunthok, an ancient book about his immigration to the human kingdom of Kangleipak.

== Bibliography ==
- Poireiton Khunthok : Chandra Singh, Moirangthem : Free Download, Borrow, and Streaming : Internet Archive
- Poiraiton khunthok (Book, 1979) WorldCat.org
