= Henjunaha and Lairoulembi =

Romantic tragedy of Meitei folklore from Manipur

Story of Henjunaha and Lairoulembi
- A book art depicting Henjunaha fighting the evil spirits, holding a polostick, and Lairoulembi, committing suicide by thrusting a knife into herself, in the second epic cycles of incarnations of the two divine lovers in Moirang, Ancient Kangleipak (early Manipur)

Folk tale
- Name: Story of Henjunaha and Lairoulembi
- Also known as: Henjunaha Lairoulembi (Old Manipuri: Hensunaha Lailoulempi)
- Aarne–Thompson grouping: no
- Mythology: Meitei mythology (Manipuri mythology)
- Country: Ancient Kangleipak (historical); India (present)
- Region: Moirang, Manipur
- Related: Meitei folklore (Manipuri folklore), Meitei literature (Manipuri literature)

The Henjunaha Lairoulembi (Old Manipuri: Hensunaha Lailoulempi), also known as the Henjunaha Lairuklembi (Old Manipuri: Hensunaha Lailuklempi), shortly known as the Henjunaha (Old Manipuri: Hensunaha), is a legendary epic love story of Henjunaha Yangleingamba (Old Manipuri: Hensunaha Yangleingampa) and Thongnang Lairoulembi (Old Manipuri: Thongnang Lailoulempi). It is one of the epic cycles of incarnations of Meitei mythology and folklore, that is originated from Moirang province of Ancient Kangleipak (early Manipur).

The legend accounts for the unconditional love affairs between Henjunaha, a fatherless lad brought up by a poor widowed mother, and Lairoulembi, a lady, brought up by a rich father, who were separated by their fates with the murder of Henjunaha by the evil spirits. However, defying all the odds, Lairoulembi followed her lover by committing suicide and succeeded in pleasing Thongalen (Thongaren), the God of death to send both of them back to the human world once again.

== Story ==
God Thangching (Thangjing) created two persons and made them the extreme lovers. Henjunaha Yangleingamba is the hero and Lairoulembi (alias Thongnang Lairuklembi) is the heroine. Henjunaha's father died at an early age and so, Henjunaha was brought up by his widowed mother Khoiju Hongbi. On the other hand, Lairoulembi grew up under the parentage of her father Thongnang Ningthouba. As the two grew up, they became devoted lovers.

One day, lady Khoiju Hongbi had an ominous dream. In her dream, she saw the incidents of her pasts during the untimely death of her husband. In her dream, she fetched water using a pitcher from a stream, during which her headgear cloth fell into the water stream getting drifted away by the current before she could picked it up. In the same dream, she followed the trails and found some people getting it and giving it back to her. With that unusual dream, lady Khoiju Hongbi was anxious. So, she warned her son Henjunaha not to go out of the house.

One day before Khoiju Hongbi's warning to Henjunaha, a person died and the dead body was buried at a place called "Khundinbi" which was near the settlement of Henjunaha. When it was nighttime, lady Khoiju Hongbi had a dinner with her son and went to bed earlier than usual. Though his mother was fast asleep, Henjunaha could not sleep because he had a desire to meet his lover Lairoulembi. Taking advantage of the situation as his mother had slept, he sneaked out of the house and went to the house of Lairoulembi. He hold a polo-stick in his hand during his journey to meet his lover.

When he reached almost half of his way, he heard the sound of muffled drone near the "Khundinbi". At first, he thought that some villagers were talking there and the night was not late yet. However, in reality, it was actually a coven of evil spirits meeting to banquet on the corpse's fleshes. Hensunaha was panicked to find out the truth. However, he did not lose his senses yet. He thought that if he ran away, the spirits would surely discover him and capture him. So, he decided to join them with his head covered, disguising himself as a member of the coven. It was not long that the spirits smelt the strong smells of a living human flesh. So, they head-count their members and found out one number additional. However, Hensunaha tricked them by taking upon himself the task of recounting and declaring the number to be correct, thus making them confused. When they were again about to continue the feast on the flesh before the arrival of dawn, Henjunaha slipped out and ran as fast as he could towards his lover's house. Realising the real living human now, the spirits chased him. They caught hold of him just on the point Hensunaha was about to set one of his foot on the verandah of his lover's house. Lairoulembi was fast asleep and could not hear the panic stricken calls of her lover Hensunaha. When she woke up and came out in the dead of night, she was horrified to find her lover in a pool of blood. On the very place, she committed suicide by thrusting a sharp knife into her own body.

The parents of Hensunaha and Lairoulembi were traumatized to see the conditions of their beloved children. Later, the dead bodies of the two lovers were buried together.

Hensunaha's soul was taken away into the underworld. However, Lairoulembi's soul was denied the entry into the land of the death because she committed suicide, which means she made her own destiny, instead of obeying gods' destiny laid on her. Lairoulembi's soul was prevented from crossing the Styx (Meitei: Ashi Turel) in the netherworld. The river of the land of the death could be crossed through a tiny thread and a bar serving as the bridge. Getting disappointed, she kept weeping on the dry sands of the river bank of the other side. Meanwhile, the youngest wife of God Thongalen (Thongaren) came out to fetch water from river and saw Lairoulembi's soul. The goddess felt pity of her and so, she pleaded her beloved husband God Thongalen to provide a place for the poor Lairoulembi's soul. At first, Thongalen denied the request but later changed his mind and allowed both the souls of Hensunaha and Lairoulembi to return to the human world to enjoy the pleasures of life for one hundred years.

Meanwhile, on the human world, the smart dog of Lairoulembi's parents sensed some sounds from beneath the burial ground of the two lovers. The dog immediately brought its masters to the place. The ground was dug out and to everyone's surprise, Hensunaha and Lairoulembi got up again alive. Then, the two devoted lovers lived happily ever after.

== In popular culture ==
- In 2015, four books based on folktales from Manipur, including one of Henjunaha, were published in Imphal.
- In 2017, at Lamboikhongnangkhong, Imphal, a show Henjunaha was shown, which drew great public responses.
- The book Henjunaha Lairoulembi, was published in Hindi Sahitya Parishad, Imphal.

== See also ==
- Lai Khutshangbi
