= Meitei culture =

Meitei cultural heritage

The culture of Meitei civilization evolved over thousands of years in what is now northeastern India and surrounding regions, beginning in Ancient Kangleipak, continuing most notably into Medieval Kangleipak, while influencing the neighboring states and kingdoms, till present times.

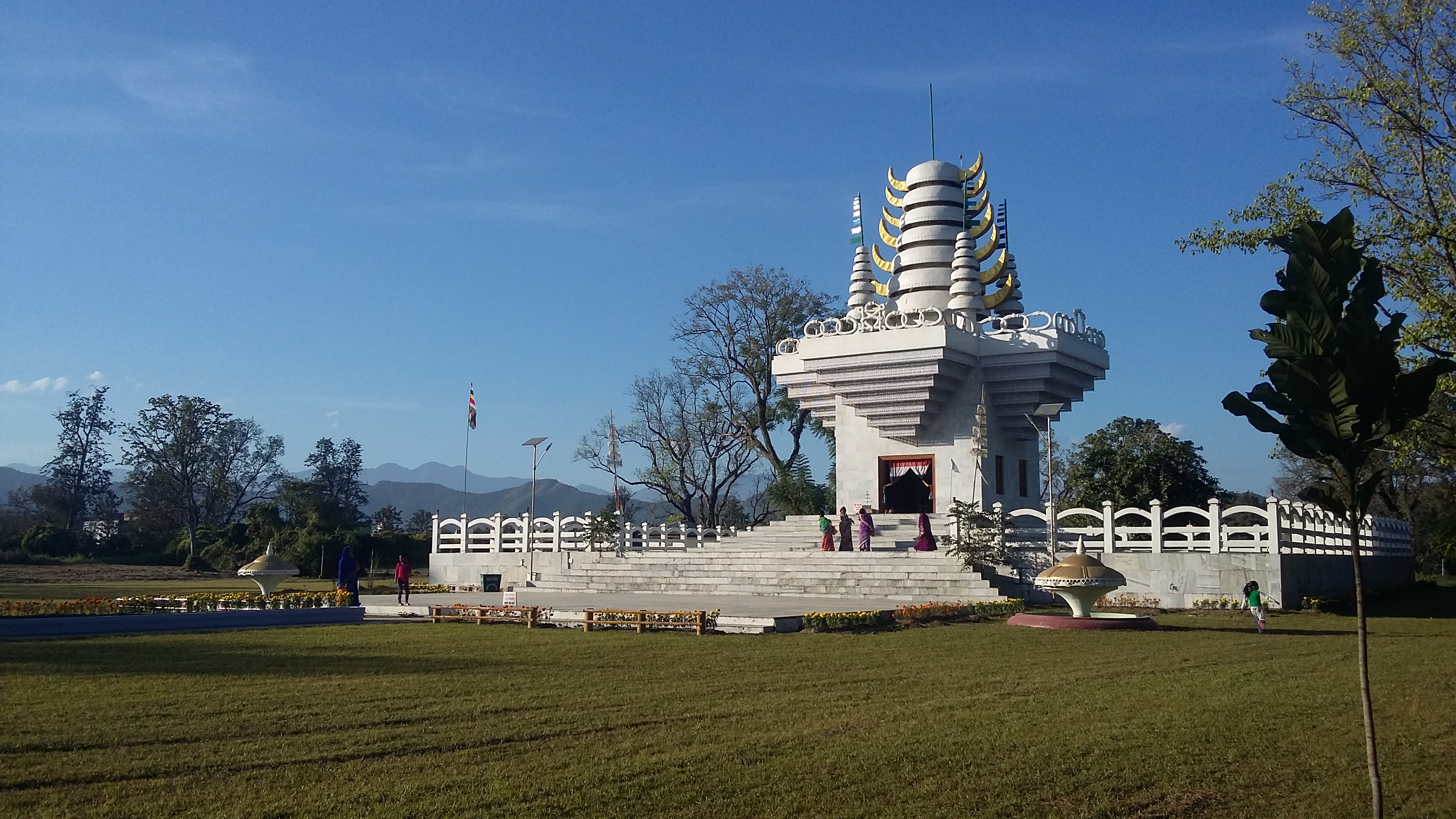
Pakhangba Temple, Kangla, in the classical Meitei architecture, affiliated to the traditional Meitei religion (Sanamahism)

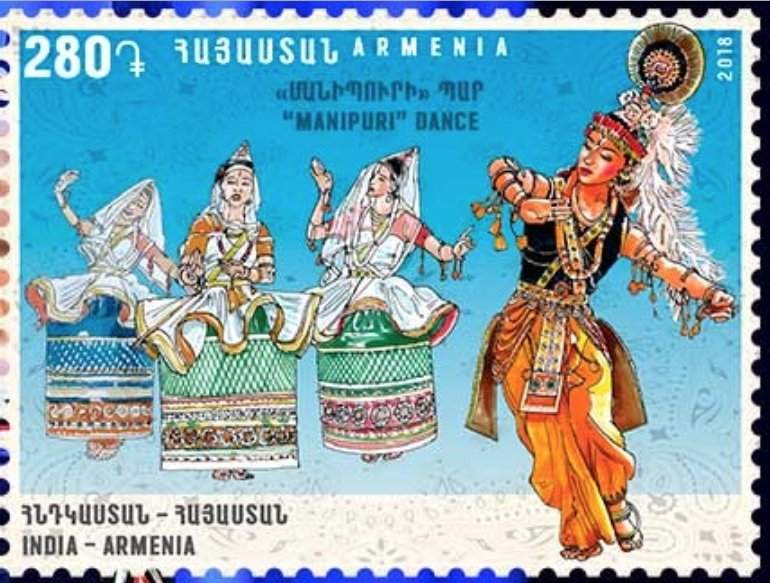
Armenian stamp illustrating Manipuri classical dance, the "national dance" of India, (Note: Manipuri dance form, along with the Armenian Hov Arek, are referred to as the "National Dances" (of India and Armenia respectively) during the Armenia-India joint issue of postage stamps.) the highest spiritual expression of the worship of Hindu deity Krishna, as well as an intangible cultural heritage of Meitei civilization

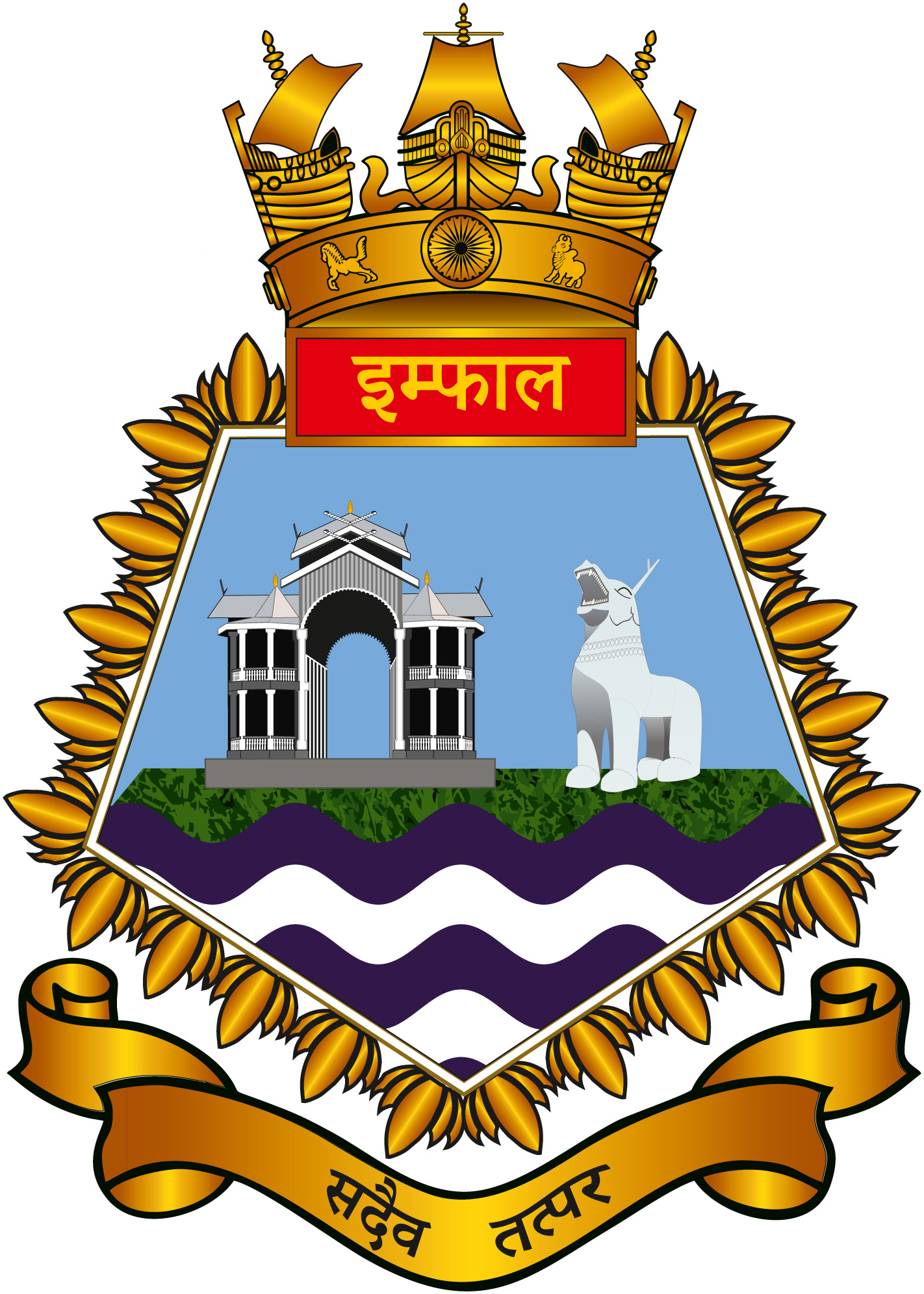
The crest of Indian missile destroyer, INS Imphal, illustrating the Kangla Sanathong (Meitei for 'Kangla Golden Gate') and the Kanglasha dragon lion, two of the most remarkable cultural heritages of the Meitei civilization

== Animals and birds ==
Dogs are mentioned as friends or companions of human beings, in many ancient Meitei tales and texts. In many cases, when dogs died, they were given respect by performing elaborate death ceremonies, equal to that of human beings.

Being wise is appreciated in Meitei society, but cunning is treated with suspicion. If a person is very cunning, they may be pejoratively be called foxy. Foxes appear in a number of Meitei folktales, including The Clever Fox (ꯂꯝꯍꯨꯢ ꯂꯧꯁꯤꯡ, Lamhui Loushing), The Fox and the Jackal (ꯂꯝꯍꯨꯢ ꯑꯃꯁꯨꯡ ꯀꯩꯁꯥꯜ, Lamhui amashung Keishal), and The Fox's Trick (ꯂꯝꯍꯨꯢ ꯒꯤ ꯇꯥꯠ, Lamhui gi Tat).

=== Goddess of doves and pigeons ===
In Meitei mythology and religion, Khunu Leima (Meitei: ꯈꯨꯅꯨ ꯂꯩꯃ, romanized: /khoo-noo lei-ma/), also known as Khunureima (Meitei: ꯈꯨꯅꯨꯔꯩꯃ, romanized: /khoo-noo-rei-ma/), is a goddess associated with pigeons and doves. She is one of the three dearest daughters of the sky god. Along with her two sisters, Nganu Leima and Shapi Leima, she got married the same person, who is a mortal.

=== Pigeon in the story of Sandrembi and Chaisra ===
In the Meitei folktale of Sandrembi and Chaisra, Lady Sandrembi, after being killed by her stepsister and stepmother, transformed herself into a pigeon and flew into the Royal Garden of the king, her husband. She perched on a tree branch and told the Royal Gardener, about the forgetfulness of the King about his wife Queen Sandrembi, the animal epidemic happened in the kingdom, the grievances of the Prince (Sandrembi's son) and the loss of the gardener's own sickle in a recent past. Sandrembi told him to report these words to the King. The king, on hearing the news, came by himself, to the pigeon in the garden. Holding some grains of paddy in his hands, the King brought and kept the supernatural bird (Sandrembi's bird form) in his custody. Even as a pigeon, she took care of the Prince. During the King's absence, Chaisra (the imposter and Sandrembi's stepsister) slaughtered the pigeon and cooked a nice meal from the meat. Upon knowing that the food was made of the very pigeon, the king refused to dine it and buried the pigeon's remains in the ground behind the Royal Kitchen.

=== Hornbills ===
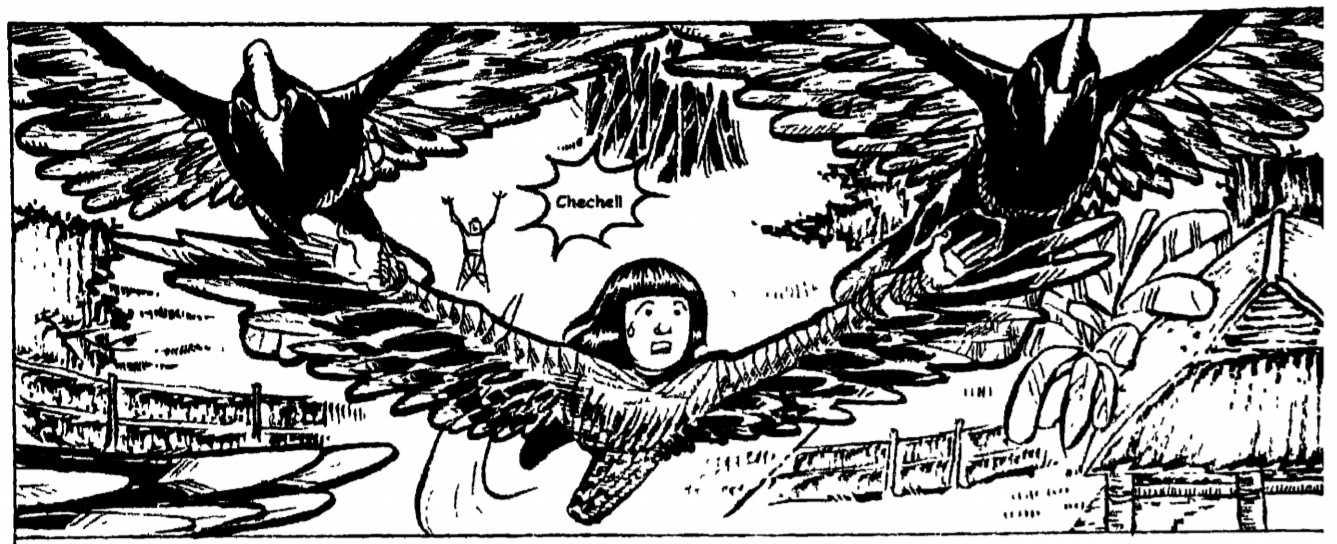
"Hayainu" as the "Uchek Langmeitong" flying high up the sky

The Meitei folktale of Uchek Langmeitong (Uchek Langmeidong), also known as Chekla Langmeitong (Chekla Langmeidong), of Ancient Kangleipak (early Manipur), narrates the tragic story of a mortal girl named "Hayainu" (alias Nongdam Atombi), who turned herself into a Langmeitong (Meitei for 'hornbill bird') as she was unable to suffer the ill treatments of her cruel and selfish stepmother, in her father's absence.

=== Sanagi Tenawa : Golden parrot ===
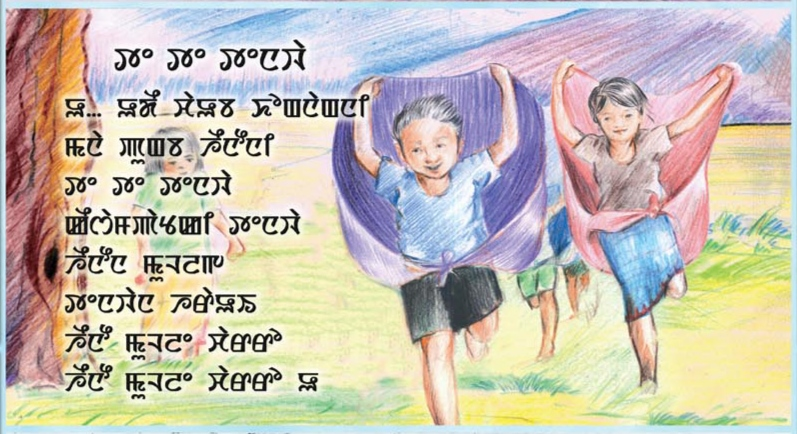
"Te Te Tenawaa" (lit. "Te Te Parrot") - a traditional Meitei children's song of Kangleipak

In a Meitei folktale of a Sanagi Tenawa (Meitei for 'golden parrot'), a divine golden parrot used to live in a land of rocks. It possessed magical spells, due to which it made all the trees of the land able to talk and move like animals. The parrot was famous far and wide. In a far away kingdom, a courageous and clever prince got the news of the parrot, which he wanted to be brought to his kingdom. Henceforth, in the dead of the night, the prince and his friend, who was a minister's son, proceeded to find the parrot, without informing his father, the king. For three full moons of phase, they travelled until they finally reached the land of rocks. Surprised to see the rocks and the talking trees, and wandering around, they found out a door way to go inside a cave. When the prince was about to go inside the cave, he heard a loud sound. The voice from unknown source asked him to stop going inside the cave for the parrot. Upon investigated, they found the voice was from a tree monster at the door.

The monster warned them of asking them three questions before they enter. If answered incorrectly, they would turn into stones. The first question was 'Who is the happiest man alive?' The prince's answer was 'One who owes no debt to anyone and who is healthy and free from any illness.' The second question was 'What are the main qualities of a king?' The prince's answer was 'A king should conduct according to the wishes of the people, should take care of the poor and destitute, and should treat everyone equally.' The final question was 'Name the gods one can see one's own eyes?' The final answer was 'One's birth parents are one's gods that they can see with their eyes.'

The tree monster was satisfied with all the correct answers and it praised the prince for his wisdom and intelligence. It allowed the prince for entry and was vanished from the spot as it was waiting for someone who could answer all the questions correctly before he leave. Inside the cave, the golden parrot was found sitting on a golden plate, as was once being under captivity of the tree monster. The prince was told by the parrot about the way to change the stones into princes. He had to sprinkle water of the golden pond on them. The prince did and undo the spells/curses of the stones, bringing them back to life. The princes thanked the prince and went back to their respective kingdoms. Finally, the parrot was brought by the prince and his friend to their kingdom.

=== Waterfowl ===
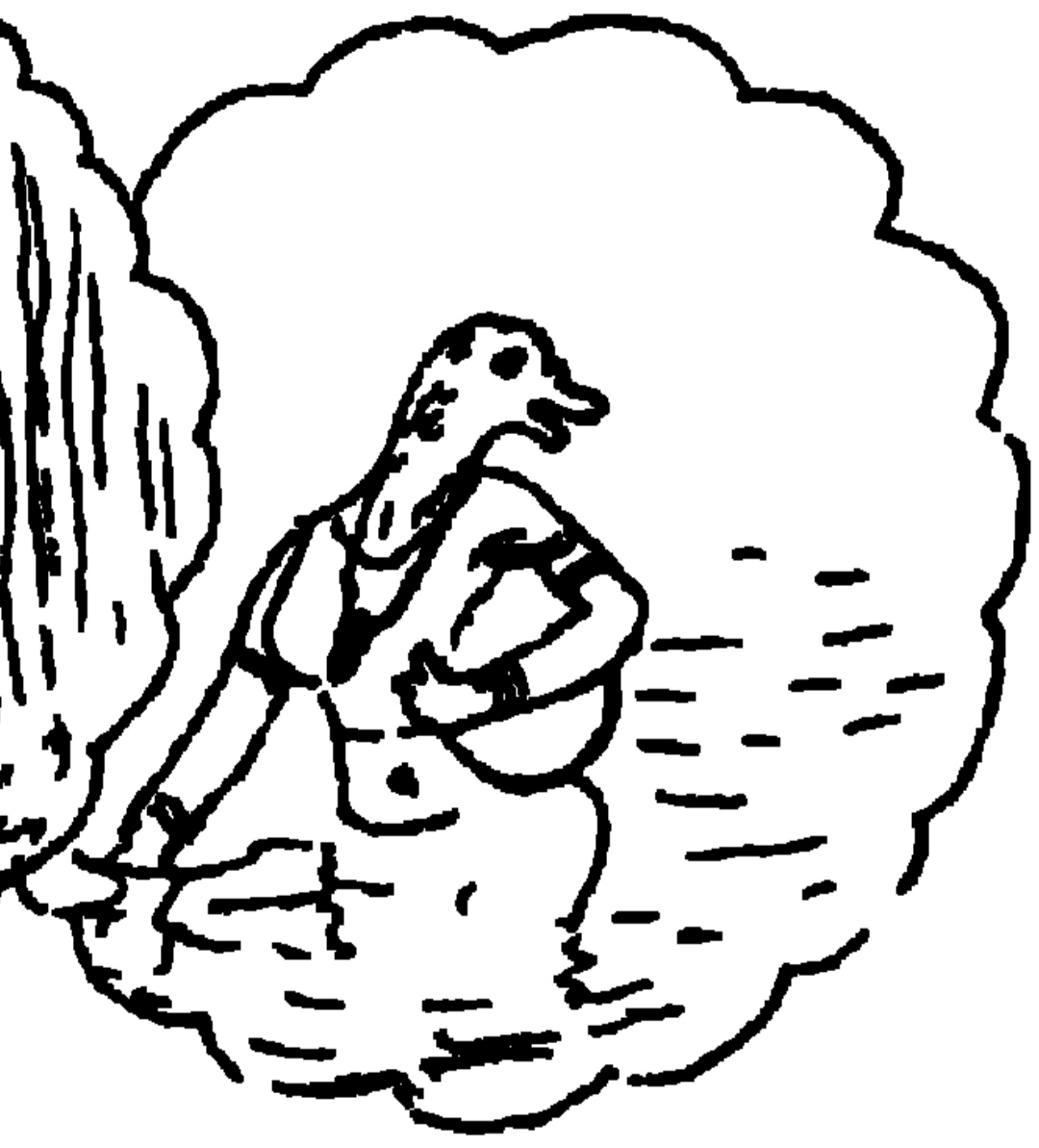
Nganu Leima, the Meitei goddess of waterfowls

In Meitei mythology and religion, Nganu Leima (Meitei: ꯉꯥꯅꯨ ꯂꯩꯃ, romanized: /ngaa-noo lei-ma/), also known as Nganureima (Meitei: ꯉꯥꯅꯨꯔꯩꯃ, romanized: /ngaa-noo-rei-ma/), is a goddess associated with ducks and other water birds . She is one of the three dearest daughters of the sky god. Along with her two sisters, Khunu Leima and Shapi Leima, she married the same person.

== Arts ==
Classicism in Meitei culture (Classicalism in Meitei culture)
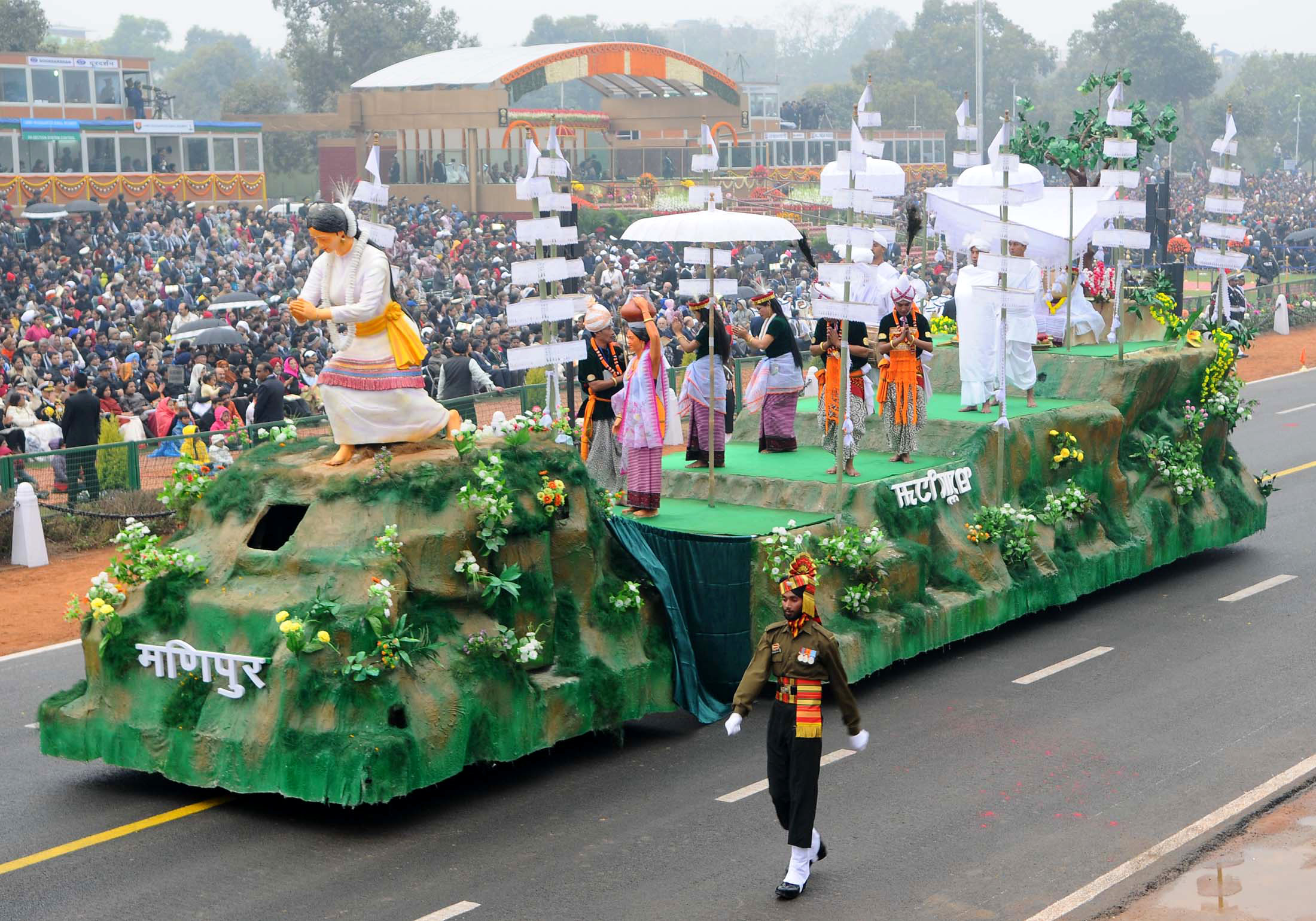
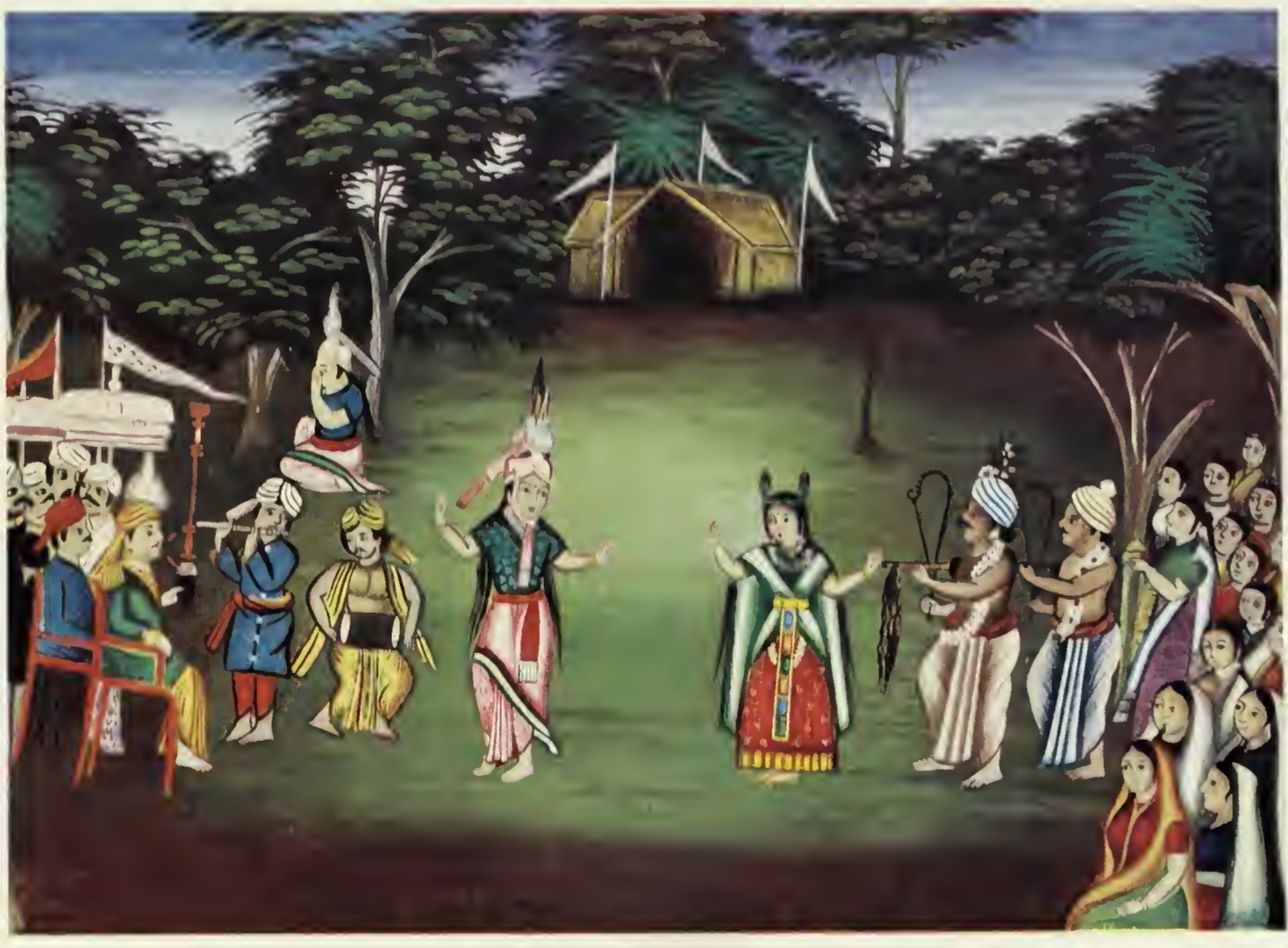
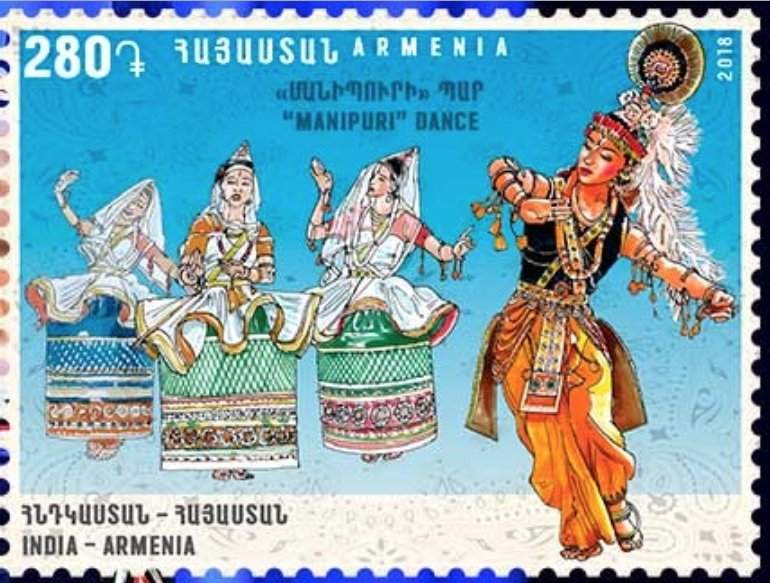
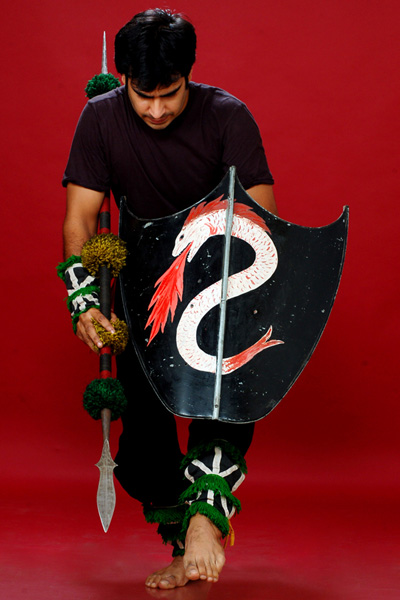
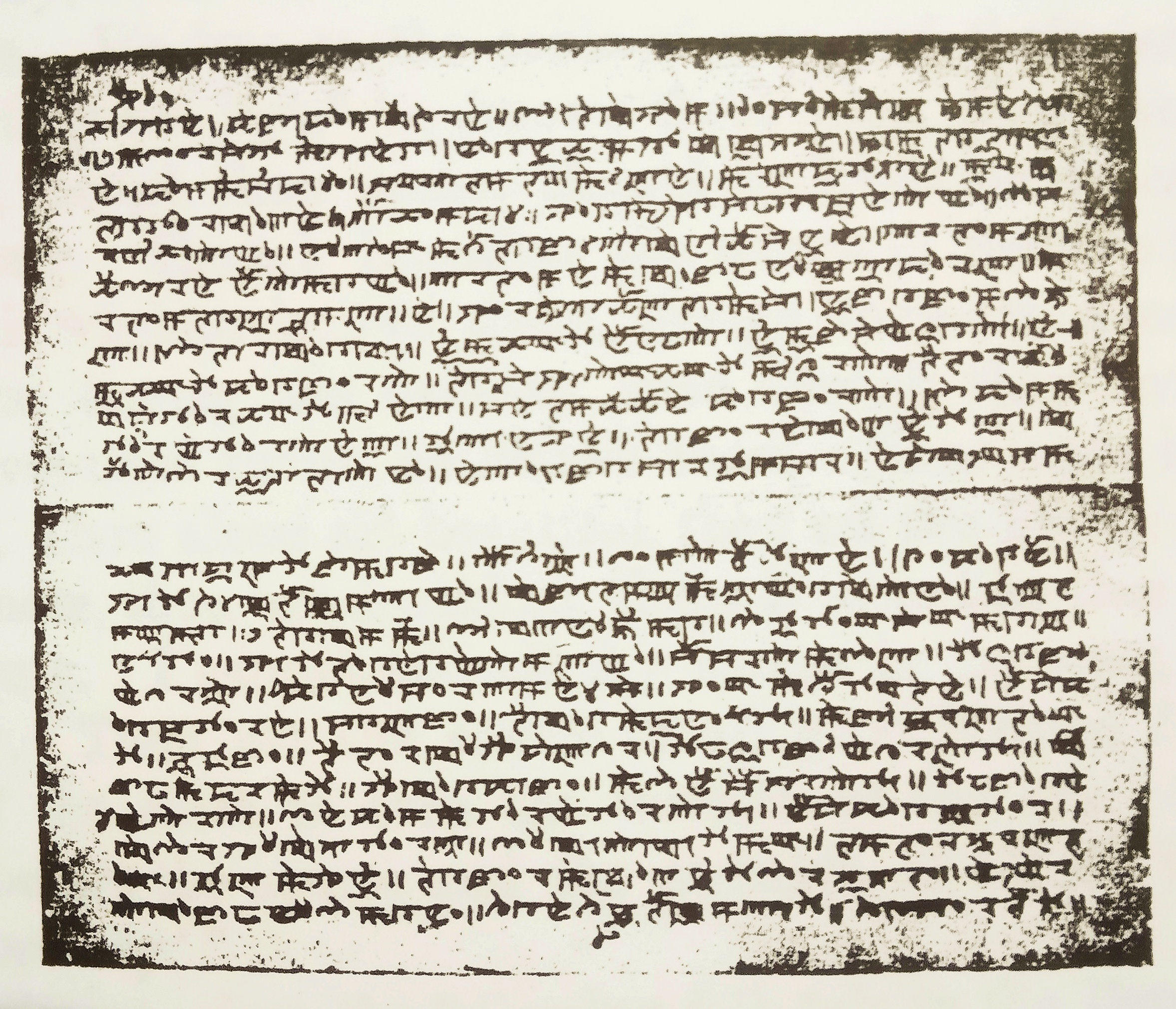
- Clockwise from top: the depiction of Lai Haraoba classical performance (Note: The ritualistic and theatrical dances of the Lai Haraoba, in general and one of its primary forms, the Khamba Thoibi Jagoi (Meitei for 'Khamba Thoibi dance') in particular, are also considered to be classical dances.) on the Republic Day of India, the Khamba Thoibi classical dance, (Note: Besides the Khamba Thoibi classical dance form, the love story of Khamba and Thoibi itself is also considered to be classical in its own heights.) the Thang-Ta classical martial art, (Note: The traditional Meitei dance-cum-martial art form of Thang-Ta gives the basic foundation of the classical choreographic steps of Lai Haraoba, Manipuri Raas Leela, Meitei Sankirtana and Pung Cholom.) the ancient Meitei language text Numit Kappa, Armenian stamp illustrating Manipuri classical dance as the "national dance" of India, (Note: Manipuri dance form, along with the Armenian Hov Arek, are referred to as the "National Dances" (of India and Armenia respectively) during the Armenia-India joint issue of postage stamps.) (Note: It is the highest spiritual expression of the worship of Hindu deity Krishna, as well as an intangible cultural heritage of Meitei civilization.)
- Cultural origins: Meitei culture

Related topics
- Intangible cultural heritage of Meitei civilization

=== Architecture ===
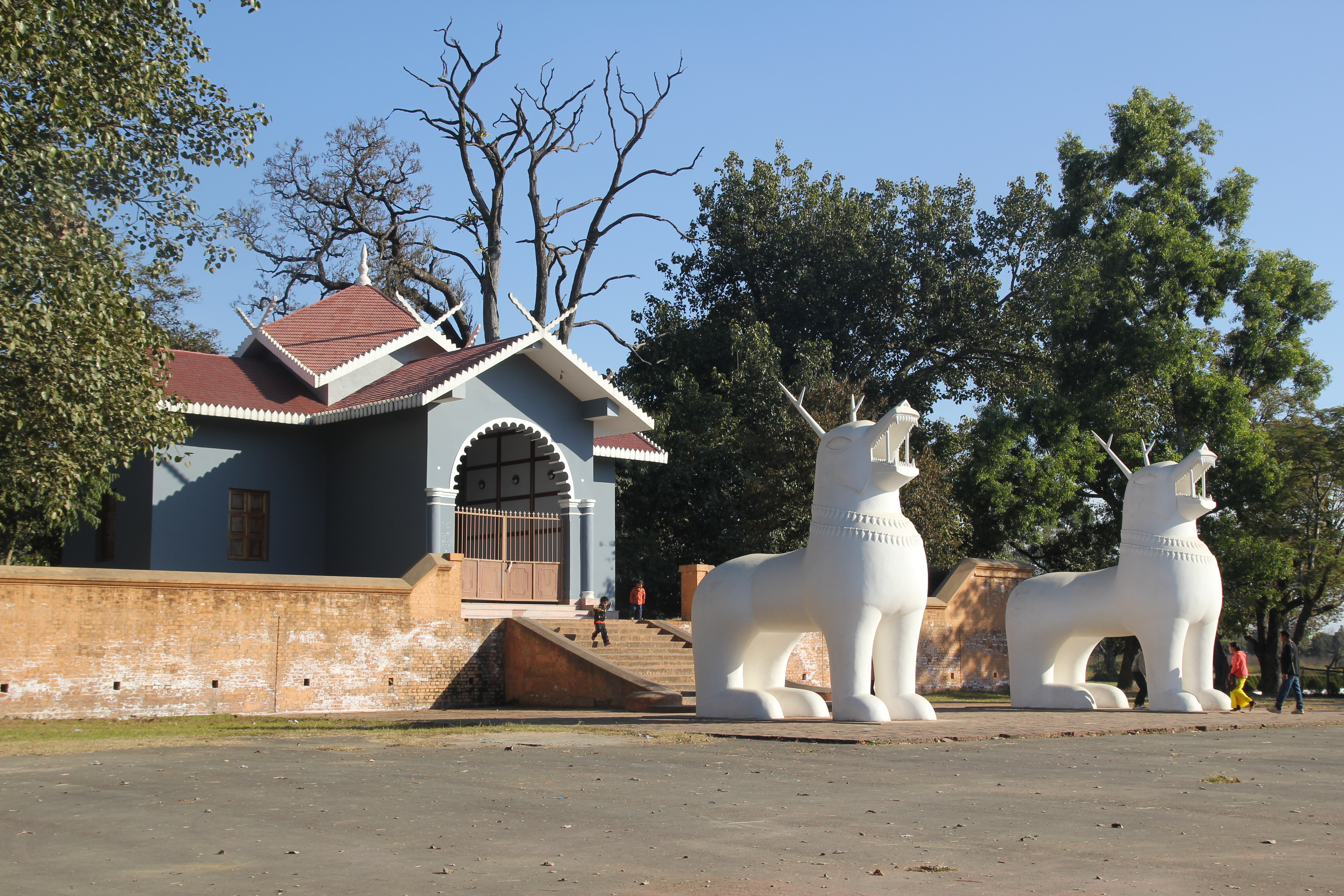
The architecture of the Inner Entrance Gate, along with the statues of a pair of Kanglashas, the dragon lions, inside the Kangla, the old metropolis of Ancient Kangleipak

The architectural works of the Meitei ethnicity is best known through its Meitei temples as well as ancient buildings including palaces, court halls, offices, entrance gates and so on.

=== Cinema ===
Ishanou (Meitei for 'The Chosen One'), a 1990 Indian Meitei language film, was screened in the Un Certain Regard section in the 1991 Cannes Film Festival, and again after a gap of 33 years, it was recognized as a "World Classic" in the 2023 Cannes Film Festival. Notably, it was the only film selected from India for the event in that year.

=== Dance ===
The steps, gaits and poses of using thang (Meitei for 'sword') and ta (Meitei for 'spear') in the traditional Meitei dance-cum-martial art form of Thang-Ta form the basic foundation of the classical choreographic steps of Lai Haraoba, Manipuri Raas Leela, Meitei Sankirtana and Pung Cholom.

The Manipuri classical dance, also known as the Manipuri Raas Leela (Meitei: ꯖꯒꯣꯏ ꯔꯥꯁ/ꯔꯥꯁ ꯖꯒꯣꯏ, romanized: Jagoi Raas/Raas Jagoi), is a jagoi and is one of the major Indian classical dance drama forms, originating from Kangleipak (Meitei for 'Manipur'). Formally developed by Meitei Hindu King Ching Thang Khomba (Meitei for 'Rajarshi Bhagyachandra') of Manipur Kingdom in the 18th century CE, the Manipuri classical dance form, which is considered to be the highest spiritual expression of the worship of Hindu deity Krishna, spreads across the Indian subcontinent in subsequent centuries. Owing to its huge influences on the diverse cultural heritages across India, it is recognised by the Sangeet Natak Akademi of the Ministry of Culture of the Government of India as one of the few primary classical dance forms of the Republic of India, and is honoured with the Sangeet Natak Akademi Award for Manipuri every year.

Pung Cholom and Meitei Nata Sankirtana are the other classical dance forms, which are also related to the Manipuri Raas Leela.

The ritualistic and theatrical dances of the Lai Haraoba, in general and one of its primary forms, the Khamba Thoibi Jagoi (Meitei for 'Khamba Thoibi dance') in particular, are also considered to be classical dances. Notably, Lai Haraoba's Khamba Thoibi Jagoi (Meitei for 'Khamba Thoibi dance') is one of the cultural elements, giving inspirations to the development of the Manipuri Raas Leela classical dance drama form.

=== Dance and Music ===
“Dance and music play a vital role in the life span of Manipuri people. The most flourishing branch of Manipuri culture is dance. The Manipuri synonym of dance is jagoi and in this dance, body movements create either circle or ellipse. Rasa dance is the finest product of Manipuri culture. Maharaj Bhagyachandra innovated it and it was first performed in Manipur in 1779 in the fullmoon of Kartik.”

— Banglapedia

=== Music ===
Nat (a shortened form of Meitei Nat Sankirtan) is a classical form of music of Manipur. It is a product of the Sanskritisation of traditional Meitei culture with Hindu culture by the Brahmanas, having 6 ragas and 36 raginis.

Contrasting to the other forms of Indian classical music, which are performed by sitting, in the Meitei Nata-Sankirtana, artists perform musical instruments as well as sing songs, simultaneously performing the delicate movements of the body and hands, based on the form of Khuthek Anoi (Meitei for 'language of hand movements'), aligning to different footsteps, based on the Khongthang Anoi (Meitei for 'language of footsteps').

=== Theatre ===
==== Meitei adaptations of classical Greco-Roman plays ====
Numerous theatrical plays based on Antigone, a princess from ancient Greek mythology, was and is frequently produced in Meitei language in its own adaptation, in Imphal. Malemnganbi is a Meitei adaptation of Sophocles' ancient Greek tragedy play named Antigone, rescripted by Makhonmani Mongsaba and directed by Chanam Nillabira Meitei. In 1985–86, Lengshonnei, a play based on Antigone, adapted into Meitei language, by Ratan Thiyam, was performed in Imphal. Some sources say that he adapted from Antigone (Sophocles play) while some others assert that it was from Antigone (Brecht play).

Hojang Taret is a classical Meitei language play based on Euripides's ancient Greek tragedy named "The Phoenician Women". Directed by Oasis Sougaijam and produced by The Umbilical Theatre in Imphal, the play shows the moral uncertainty of the royal sibling rivalry that led to the destruction of the ancient city of Thebes, Greece.

Bacchae (Thiyam play) is a classical Meitei language play, based on the eponymous ancient Greek tragedy, authored by Euripides (480-406 BCE), one of the 3 tragedians of classical Athens. Directed by Thawai Thiyam, the Meitei play shows the story of king Pentheus of Thebes and Olympian god Dionysus.

==== Meitei adaptations of classical Sanskrit plays ====
Classical Sanskrit plays such as Urubhangam (originally authored by Bhasa in 2nd-3rd century CE) was reproduced into its Meitei version by Ratan Thiyam, shown in Imphal, Panaji, Edinburgh, as well as in Athens. Its another Meitei version was directed by Uttamkumar Naorem, shown in Kakching.

Others include Shakuntala (based on Kalidas' Abhigyanam Shakuntalam), directed by Kshetri Jugindro, shown in the Jawaharlal Nehru Dance Academy in Imphal. Bhagwatajjukiyam (based on Bodhayana's Bhagavadajjukam) was produced in a Meitei version, directed by Kshetri Jugindro, under the "Manipuri Ensemble", notably staged in the 2023 Bharat Rang Mahotsav.

== Hills and mountains ==
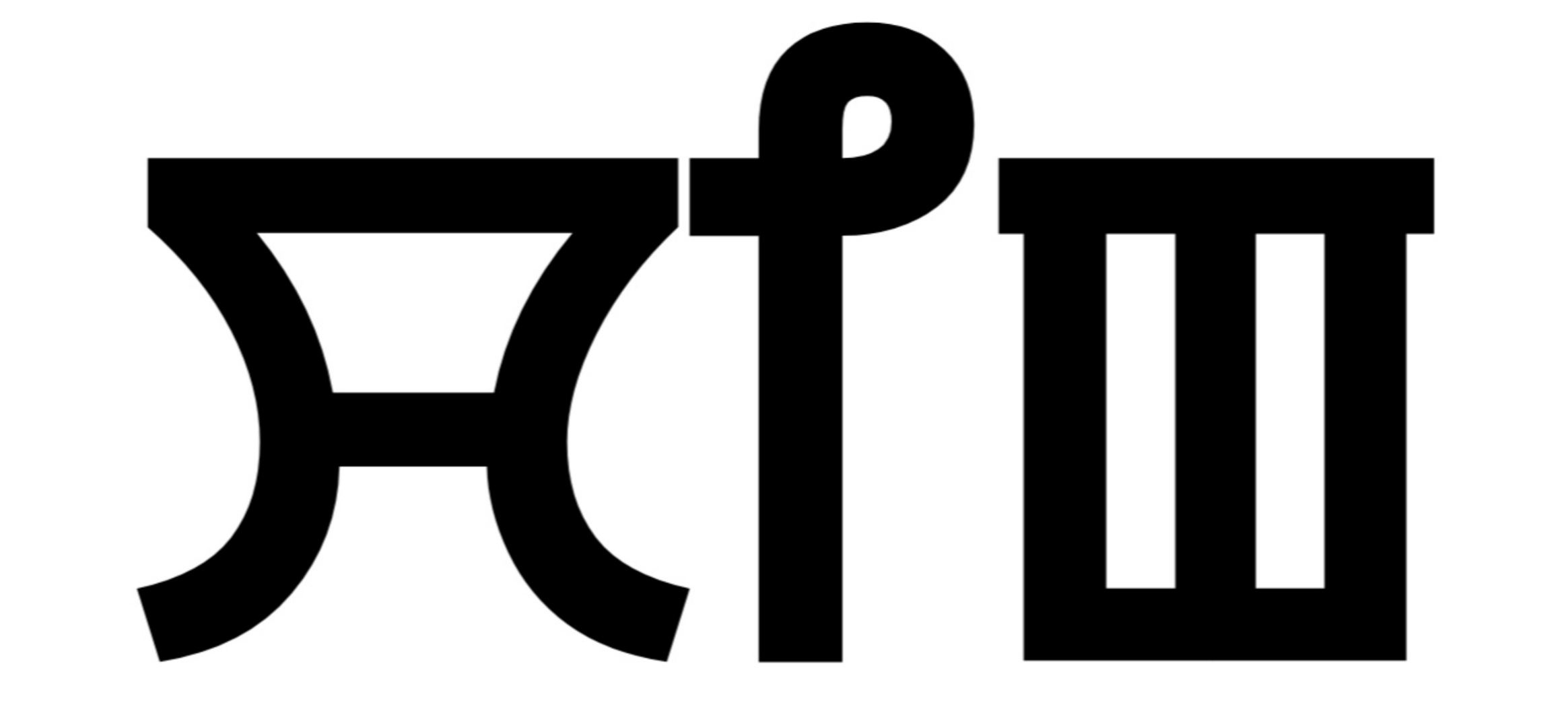
"Ching", a Meitei language root word for "hill" or "mountain"

Many Chings (Meitei for 'hills and mountains') play significant role in different elements of Meitei culture, including but not limited to Meitei folklore, Meitei folktales, Meitei literature, Meitei mythology and Meitei religion (Sanamahism) of Kangleipak (Meitei for 'Manipur').

Terms in Meitei language (officially called 'Manipuri')	Translation(s)	Notes/References
"Ching" (Meitei: ꯆꯤꯡ)	either a hill or a mountain	
"Cingjāo" (Meitei: ꯆꯤꯡꯖꯥꯎ, lit. 'hill/mountain‑to be large')	a high mountain	
"Cingdum" (Meitei: ꯆꯤꯡꯗꯨꯝ, lit. 'hill‑sth rounded')	a hillock; mound	
"Cingsāng" (Meitei: ꯆꯤꯡꯁꯥꯡ, lit. 'hill/mountain‑to be long')	the range of a hill or mountain	

=== Heingang Ching ===
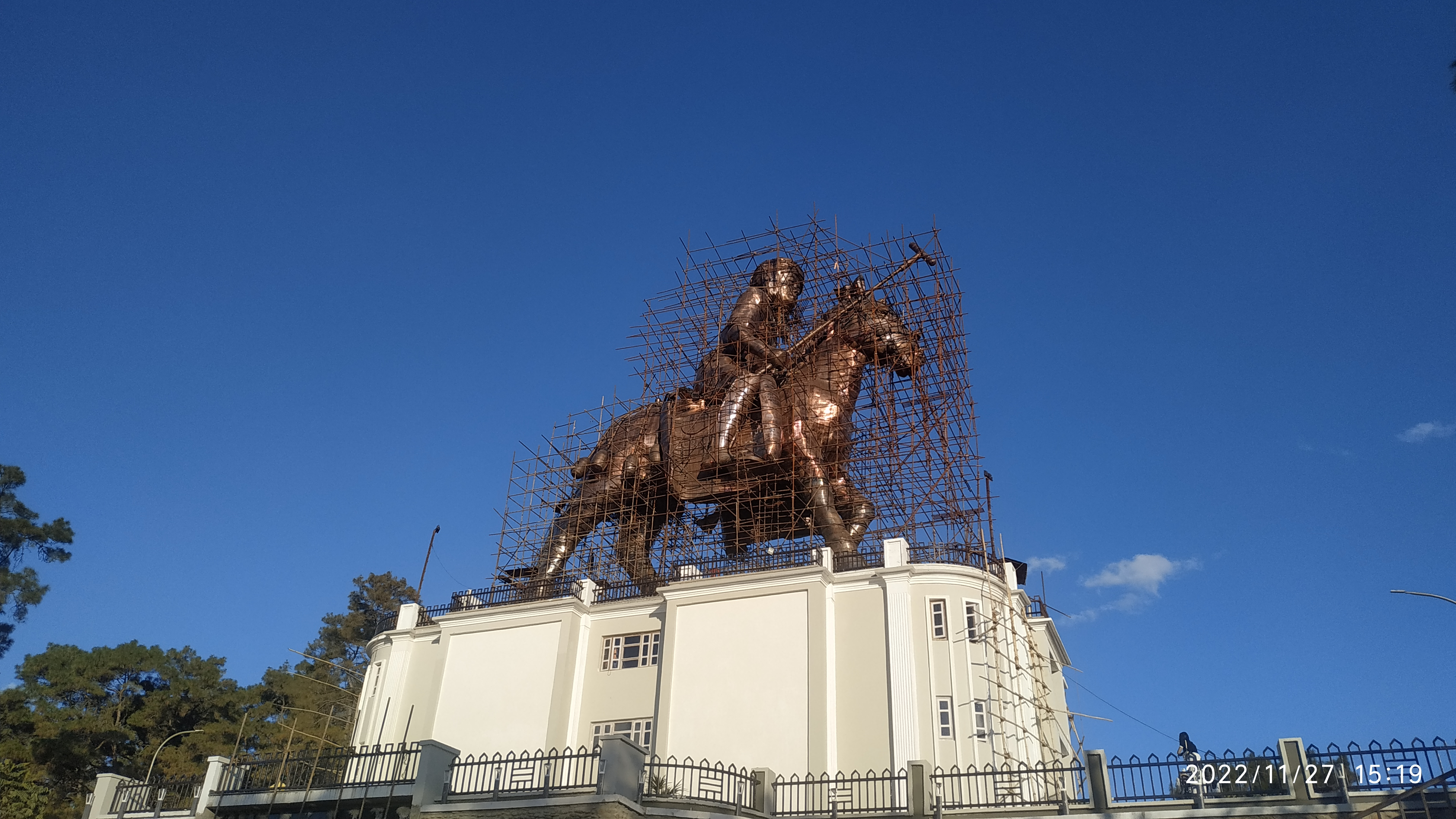
The Marjing Polo Statue inside the Marjing Polo Complex in November, 2022

In Meitei mythology and religion (Sanamahism), the Heingang Ching (Meitei: ꯍꯩꯉꯥꯡ ꯆꯤꯡ) is a sacred mountain and the home of God Marjing, the ancient Meitei deity of Sagol Kangjei (Meitei for 'polo'), Khong Kangjei (Meitei for 'hockey') and Meitei horse (Manipuri pony).

The Government of Manipur developed Marjing Polo Statue, the world's tallest equestrian statue of a player of Sagol Kangjei (Meitei for 'polo game'), riding a Meitei horse (Manipuri pony), standing inside the Marjing Polo Complex, the sacred sports site dedicated to God Marjing, which is on the hilltop of the Heingang Ching, being historically, mythologically and religiously associated with the game of polo (Meitei: Sagol Kangjei). It is built to commemorate the game of "modern polo" being originated from Kangleipak (Meitei for 'Manipur').

=== Koupalu Ching ===
The Koupalu Ching (Meitei: ꯀꯧꯄꯂꯨ ꯆꯤꯡ), also known as the Koubaru Ching (Meitei: ꯀꯧꯕꯔꯨ ꯆꯤꯡ) or the Koubru Ching (Meitei: ꯀꯧꯕ꯭ꯔꯨ ꯆꯤꯡ), in the Northwest of Kangleipak, is a sacred mountain and a divine abode of Koupalu (Koubru), the ancient Meitei deity, who protects the Northwest direction. Innumerable shrines and holy sites dedicated to Him are located in its mountainous realms, where Meitei people regularly visit and worship Him. Many ancient Meitei language texts including but not limited to the Chinglon Laihui, the Chinggoirol, the Chingsatlon, the Nunglon mentioned about the Koupalu Ching (Koubru Ching).

=== Kounu Ching ===
The "Kounu Ching" (Meitei: ꯀꯧꯅꯨ ꯆꯤꯡ, lit. 'Mount Kounu'), located in the Senapati district of Manipur, is a sacred mountain as well as a divine abode of ancient Meitei goddess Kounu, the consort of God Koupalu (Koubru). Numerous shrines and sacred sites dedicated to her are found scattered across the mountain. Meitei people regularly visit and worship her in her holy sanctuaries.

=== Langkol Ching ===
The Langgol Chinggoiba is an ancient Meitei language text which is a description for the Langkol Ching (Meitei: ꯂꯥꯡꯀꯣꯜ ꯆꯤꯡ), also called the Langgol Ching (Meitei: ꯂꯥꯡꯒꯣꯜ ꯆꯤꯡ), a hill situated in the north of Imphal. According to the text, the Langkol Ching is the first perfect creation of seven goddesses and eighteen gods.

When Panthoibi, the Meitei princess, was sporting with her paramour Nongpok Ningthou, she reminded him of the crack of dawn and of the fear of them being seen by her mother-in-law Manu Tekngā. Henceforth the slope has been known as Chingnung Shoy.

— Langkol Chingkoipa (Langgol Chinggoiba) (Note: These are the descriptions of the different places in the Langkol Ching.)

And this is the place where Nungpan Choupri maintained his kiddle for which he laid a wooden beam across the stream and erected strong reeds densely beneath it to block the passage of fishes. He handed over regularly to his wife those caught in daytime. But for some successive nights no fish could be found in the trap for which his wife developed suspicion of his having illicit relation with another woman. He sincerely pleaded that some evil spirits might have gobbled them up during the night. The fisherman invoked the god of the sky to save him from this predicament. Blessed as he was, he kept a night-long vigil on the top of a tree and could dispel with his sharp sword a rabble of goblins who clambered up to devour him. Therefore the place took the name of Laihat Shoy and also Aham Shoy as the fisherman returned home with an empty creel.

— Langkol Chingkoipa (Langgol Chinggoiba)

=== Nongmaiching Ching ===
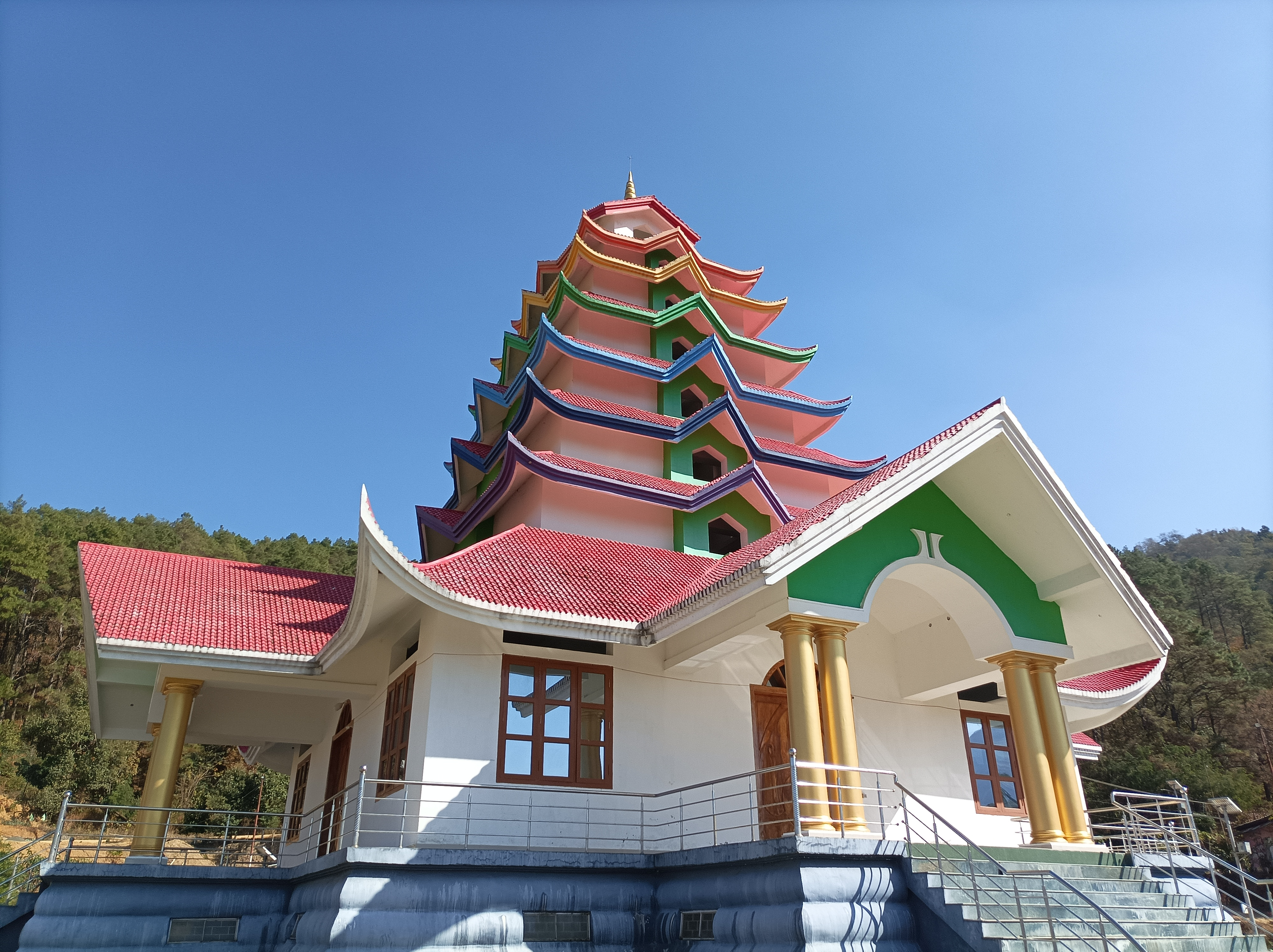
The Lainingthou Sanamahi Kiyong shrine is the central body of the University of Sanamahi Culture, in the hilltop of the Nongmaiching Ching.

=== Nongmaiching Chingkoipa ===
The Nongmaijing Chinggoiba (also called, "Nongmaijing Chinggoiba") is an ancient Meitei language text. It describes the sprawling branches of the Nongmaiching mountain (Meitei: ꯅꯣꯡꯃꯥꯏꯆꯤꯡ ꯆꯤꯡ), which extends from the North to the South of the Imphal Valley of Kangleipak. The opening lines of the text describes the Nongmaiching to a king as follows:

O King, the mountain situated in the east and beyond the river is the abode of Kainou Chingsomba, lord of the Langmais. They attain majestic heights, are washed by seven streams, project into nine ranges and abound with deep gorges and sun-drenched ridges... They catch first the sight of every onlooker and stand steadfast unshaken by great earthquakes as if held by strong iron pegs and with their peaks kissed by white flakes of cloud. Their slopes are smoothly carpeted green with pennyworts under the shadow of tall and robust plants of cane and they are also dotted with dense growth of tall reeds. And the gorges reverberate against the strong current of wind. Of these mountain ranges the bard would like to sing.

— Nongmaiching Chingkoipa (Nongmaijing Chinggoiba)

Following these lines, the author describes on many cliffs, slopes and its peripheral areas of the Nongmaiching mountain.

==== Panthoibi Naheirol ====
The "Panthoibi Naheirol" (Meitei: ꯄꯥꯟꯊꯣꯏꯕꯤ ꯅꯥꯍꯩꯔꯣꯜ, romanized: pānthoibī nāheirōl) is an ancient Meitei language text. According to it, ancient Meitei goddess Panthoibi pretended to be unwell in front of her mother, just to make her mother call physician Nongpok Ningthou (her secret paramour) for the treatment of her fake illness. While telling her mother about Nongpok Ningthou, princess Panthoibi mentioned the Nongmaiching (aka Langmai Ching) as follows:

As I told you there is one who is reigning supreme in the Langmai Hills on whose slope the sun shines first.

— Panthoibi to her mother in the "Panthoibi Naheirol"

== Language ==
Meitei language (Meitei: ꯃꯩꯇꯩꯂꯣꯟ/মৈতৈলোন, romanized: Meiteilon), also known as Manipuri language (Meitei: ꯃꯅꯤꯄꯨꯔꯤ/মণিপুরী), is a classical language of Tibeto-Burman branch of the Sino-Tibetan linguistic family, having a literary tradition of not less than 2000 years. Some of the early literary works include the Ougri (c. 1st century CE musical composition), the Numit Kappa (c. 1st century CE narrative work), the Poireiton Khunthok (c. 3rd century CE narrative work), the Khencho (pre-7th century CE musical composition), 6th-7th century CE copper plate inscriptions of king Khongtekcha, the Panthoibi Khonggul (c. 8th century CE narrative work), the Loiyumpa Silyel (c. 11th-12th century CE written Constitution, drafted in 429 CE), etc. Besides, Meitei language is best known for its classical association with the Manipuri classical dance and other intangible cultural heritages of Meitei civilization.

== Literature ==
"The beginning of this old Manipuri literature (as in the case of Newari) may go back to 1500 years, or even 2000 years, from now."

— Suniti Kumar Chatterji, Padma Vibhushan awardee Indian scholar

Meitei literature dates back right from the 15th century BC, during the era of Tangcha Lee La Pakhangpa (Tangja Leela Pakhangba) (1445 BC-1405 BC) in Ancient Manipur. The Puya (Meitei texts) account for most of the accounts for the literary works till Medieval Manipur.

Khamba Thoibi Sheireng (Meitei for 'Epic of Khamba and Thoibi'), the third longest Indian epic poem, next to the Mahabharata and the Ramayana, is a classical Meitei epic poem, having 39,000 lines, and is regarded as the national epic of the Manipuris. The Meitei classic tale of Khamba and Thoibi became an Assamese classic as well, after being translated into Assamese language as "Khamba Thoibir Sadhukatha", by Assamese author and anthropologist Rajanikanta Bordoloi (1869-1939).

Besides the Khamba Thoibi, other notable ancient Meitei narrative literary works which are considered to be classics, include the Nungpan Ponpi Luwaopa, the Chainarol and the story of Petanga.

The tales of Meitei folklore, which are considered to be classical in heights, include the stories of Sandrembi and Cheisra, Emoinu (Imoinu), Hanuba Hanubi Paan Thaaba, Pebet and Hoidong Lamboiba, Thabaton and Keibu Keioiba, Lai Khutshangbi, Uchek Langmeidong, Eeta Thangmei and Tapta.

Since ancient times, it was continuously used to be the sole "court language" of the Durbar (court) as well as all the other courts in the Kingdom of Manipur, later even officially declared as such in the Manipur State Constitution Act 1947, before Manipur became a territory of the Republic of India.

Owing to its huge literary heritage of ancient and medieval eras written in traditional Meitei script, it was recognised by the Sahitya Akademi of the Ministry of Culture of the Government of India as one of the major advanced languages of India in 1972, and since then, it was honoured annually with the Sahitya Akademi Award for Meitei, the Sahitya Akademi Translation Prize for Meitei, the Yuva Puraskar for Meitei and the Bal Sahitya Puraskar Award for Meitei. Later, it was again recognised by the Government of India as an official scheduled language, enlisted in the Eighth Schedule to the Constitution of India in 1992. Since 2013, Meitei classical language movement for the official recognition of Meitei as a "classical language" is carried out widespreadly, in Manipur, Assam and Tripura, endorsed by the Government of Manipur, several civil society organizations and various language experts.

Some of the most prominent Puyas, written in Meitei language (Manipuri language), are given below in alphabetical order:

- Chada Laihui
- Chainarol
- Chothe Thangwai Pakhangba
- Hijan Hirao (Hichan Hilao)
- Khongjomnubi Nongarol
- Khuman Kangleirol
- Khumanlon
- Konthoujam Nongarol
- Leishemlon
- Leithak Leikharol
- Moirang Ningthourol Lambuba
- Ningthourol Lambuba
- Nongban Pombi Luwaoba
- Numit Kappa
- Panthoibi Khongul
- Phouoibi Waron
- Poireiton Khunthok
- Sakok Lamlen
- Sanamahi Laihui
- Tharon (Thalon)
- Toreirol Lambuba
- Tutenglon
- Wakoklon Heelel Thilen Salai Amailon Pukok Puya

== Public holidays and festivals ==
Important days fall in different times of a year according to Meitei calendar. Some are as follows in alphabetical order:

- Cheiraoba (ꯆꯩꯔꯥꯎꯕ)- 1st of Sajibu month
- Emoinu Eratpa (ꯏꯃꯣꯢꯅꯨ ꯏꯔꯥꯠꯄ)- 12th of Wakching month
- Heikru Hidongba (ꯍꯩꯀ꯭ꯔꯨ ꯍꯤꯗꯣꯡꯕ)- 11th of Langban month
- Kwaak Taanba (ꯀ꯭ꯋꯥꯛ ꯇꯥꯟꯕ)- 10th of Mera month
- Mera Chaorel Houba (ꯃꯦꯔꯥ ꯆꯥꯎꯔꯦꯜ ꯍꯧꯕ)- 1st of Mera month
- Mera Hou Chongba (ꯃꯦꯔꯥ ꯍꯧ ꯆꯣꯡꯕ)- 15th of Mera month
- Ningol Chakouba (ꯅꯤꯉꯣꯜ ꯆꯥꯛꯀꯧꯕ)- 2nd of Hiyangei month
- Panthoibi Iratpa (ꯄꯥꯟꯊꯣꯢꯕꯤ ꯏꯔꯥꯠꯄ)
- Sanamahi Ahong Khong Chingba (ꯁꯅꯥꯃꯍꯤ ꯑꯍꯣꯡ ꯈꯣꯡ ꯆꯤꯡꯕ)-
- Yaoshang (ꯌꯥꯎꯁꯪ) -15th of Lamtaa month, Full moon

== Religion ==
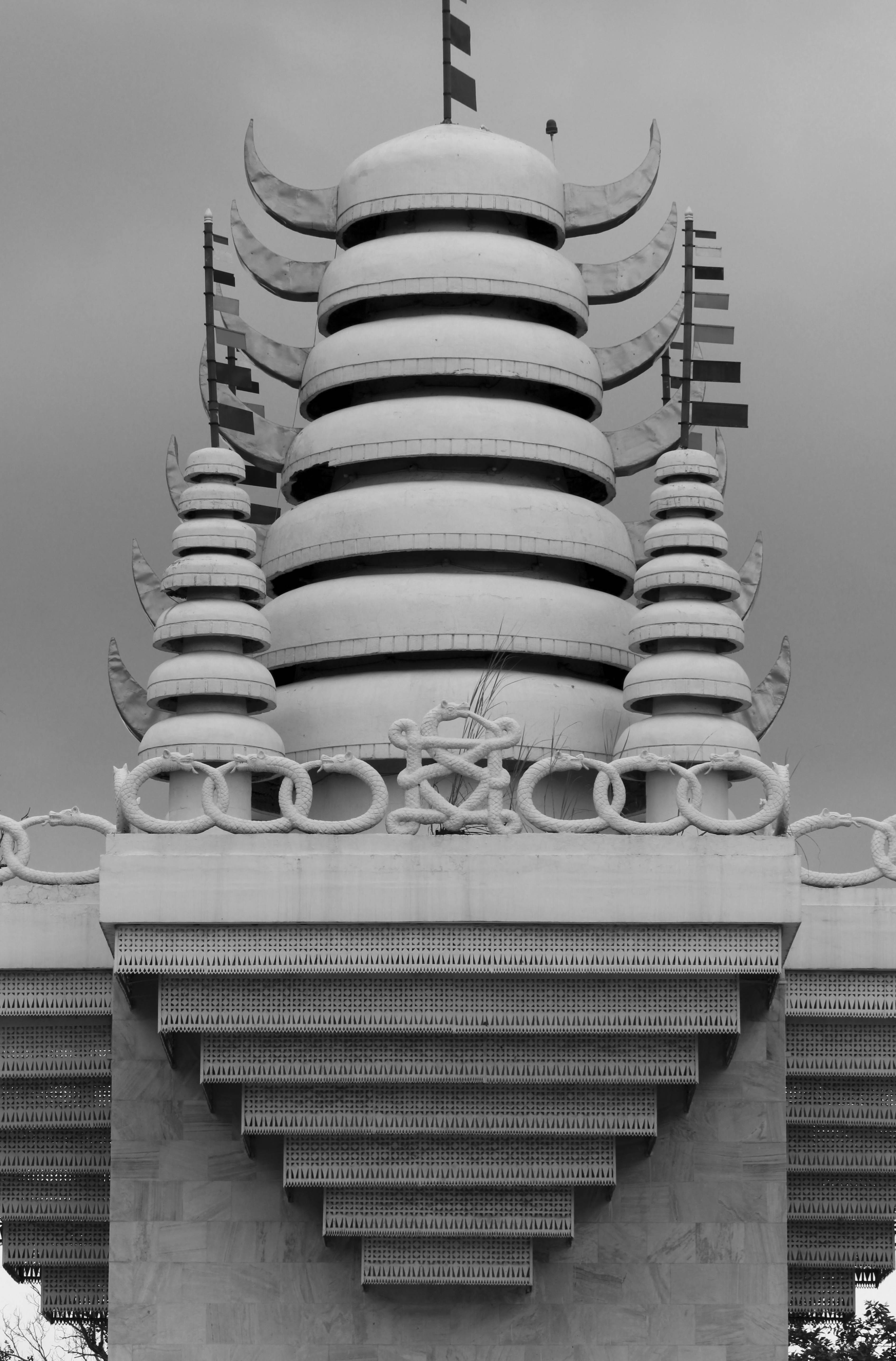
The Iputhou Pakhangba Laishang, an ancient temple, inside the Kangla.

Sanamahism, the Meitei religion, has thousands of Meitei deities.The List of figures in Meitei mythology accounts for the characters in Meitei mythology, the receptacle of the Meitei religion.

=== Lai Haraoba ===
The "Lai Haraoba" festival is an ancient ritualistic music and dance festival, often performed in order to please the Umang Lais and the Lam Lais, whose pantheons are found scattered in the plains of Manipur still today.

Jagoi, originally spelled as Chatkoi, is the traditional form of dancing, performed by the devotees to please the deities. Here is a list of the "Chatkoi"s ("Jagoi"s) :

C

- Chukpharon Jagoi

K

- Khamba Thoibi Jagoi

L

- Laiching Jagoi
- Laihou Jagoi
- Leima Jagoi
- Leisem Jagoi

M

- Maibi Jagoi

P

- Panthoibi Jagoi

T

- Thougal Jagoi

=== Death ceremony ===
The Meitei people perform four types of death ceremony since time immemorial. These are:

1. Air ceremony (Disposal to the space)
2. Earth ceremony (Burial)
3. Fire ceremony (Burning)
4. Water ceremony (Disposal to the water bodies)

=== Relationship with nature ===
In Meitei mythology and Meitei folklore of Manipur, deforestation is mentioned as one of the reasons to make mother nature (most probably goddess Leimarel Sidabi) weep and mourn for the death of her precious children. In an ancient Meitei language narrative poem named the "Hijan Hirao" (Old Manipuri: "Hichan Hilao"), it is mentioned that King Hongnem Luwang Ningthou Punsiba of Luwang dynasty once ordered his men for the cutting down of woods in the forest for crafting out a beautiful royal Hiyang Hiren. His servants spotted on a gigantic tree growing on the slope of a mountain and by the side of a river. They performed traditional customary rites and rituals before chopping off the woods on the next day. In the middle of the night, Mother nature started weeping in the fear of losing her child, the tree. Her agony is described as follows:

At dead of night

The mother who begot the tree
And the mother of all giant trees,
The queen of the hill-range
And the mistress of the gorges
Took the tall and graceful tree
To her bosom and wailed:
"O my son, tall and big,
While yet an infant, a sapling
Didn't I tell you
To be an ordinary tree?

The king's men have found you out
And bought your life with gold and silver.
* * At daybreak, hacked at the trunk
You will be found lying prostrate.
No longer will you respond To your mother's call
Nor a likeness of you
Shall be found, when I survey
The whole hillside.

Who shall now relieve my grief?"

— Hijan Hirao

== See also ==
- Meitei intangible cultural heritage
