= Meitei classical dance =

Manipuri classical dance

Meitei classical dance (also known as Manipuri classical dance) may refer to:

- any long-established ancient dance form of Meitei culture (also called Manipuri culture)
  - Jagoi
- Manipuri Raas Leela dance, officially known as Manipuri dance, one of the 8 major Indian classical dance forms, recognised by the Sangeet Natak Akademi
- Dance forms of the Lai Haraoba holy and sacred devotional, ritualistic & theatrical performances.
- Khamba Thoibi Jagoi, an old dance form, believed to be first performed by Khamba & Thoibi, devoted to God Thangjing
- Pung Cholom dance
