= Meitei intangible cultural heritage =

Intangible cultural heritage of Meitei civilization

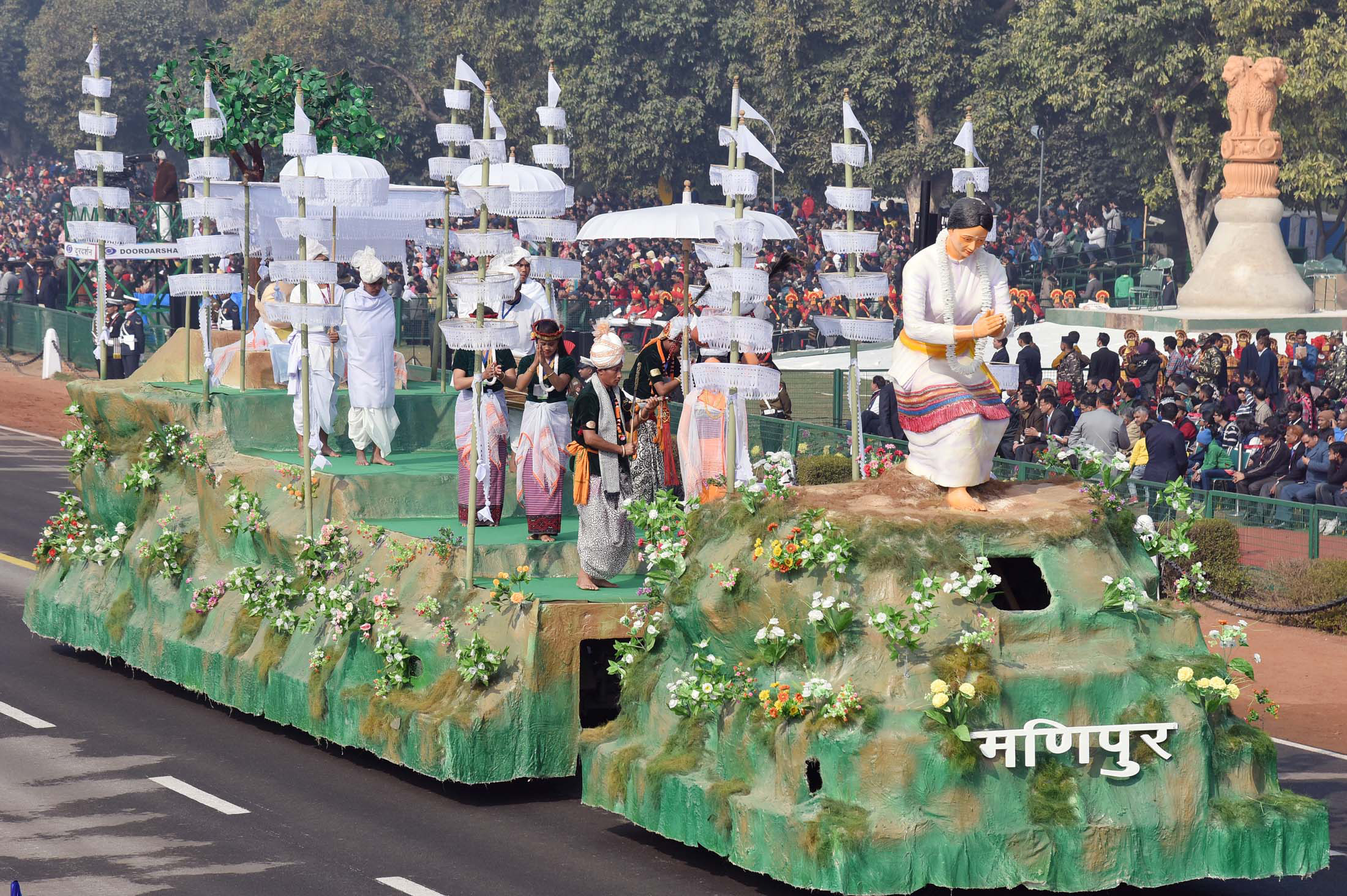
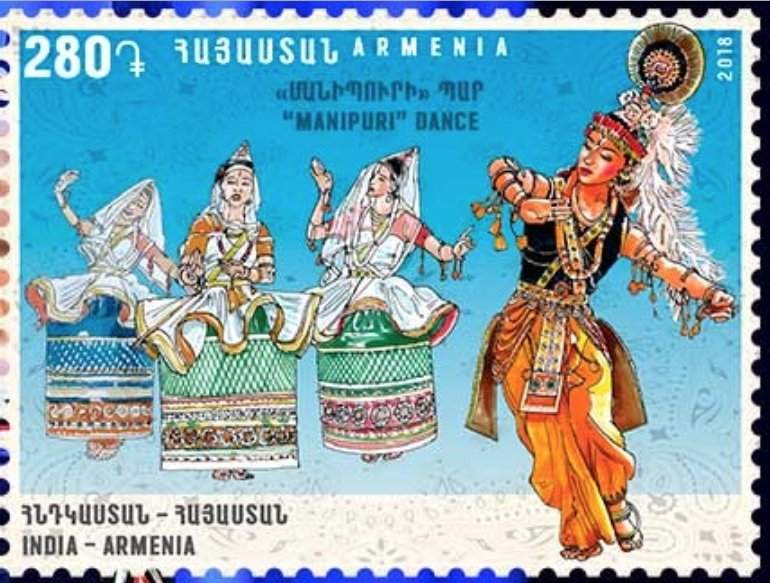
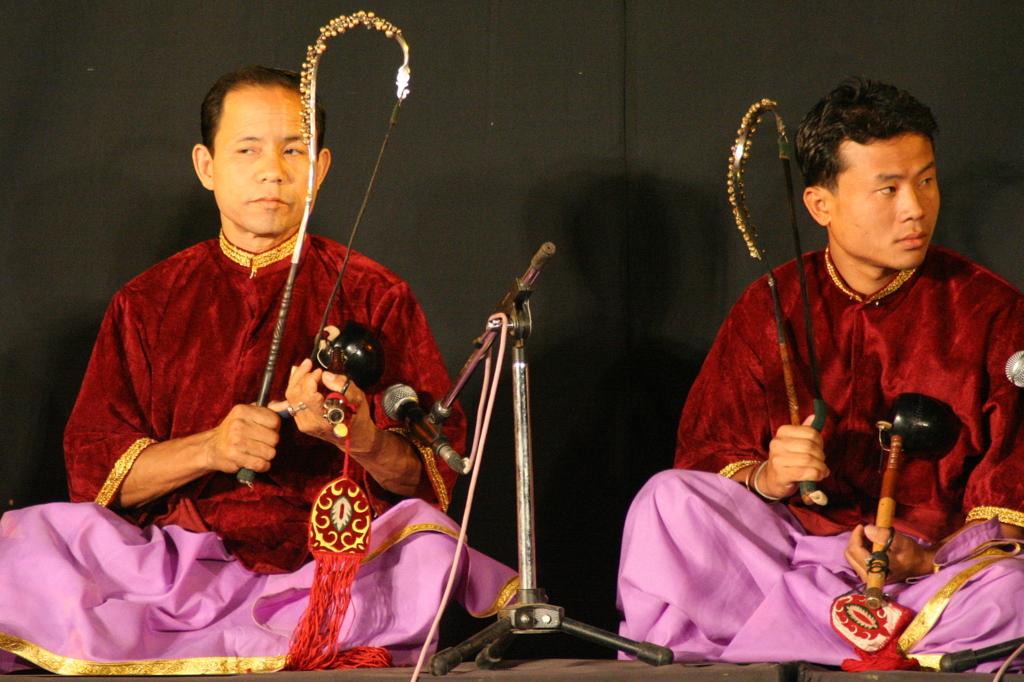
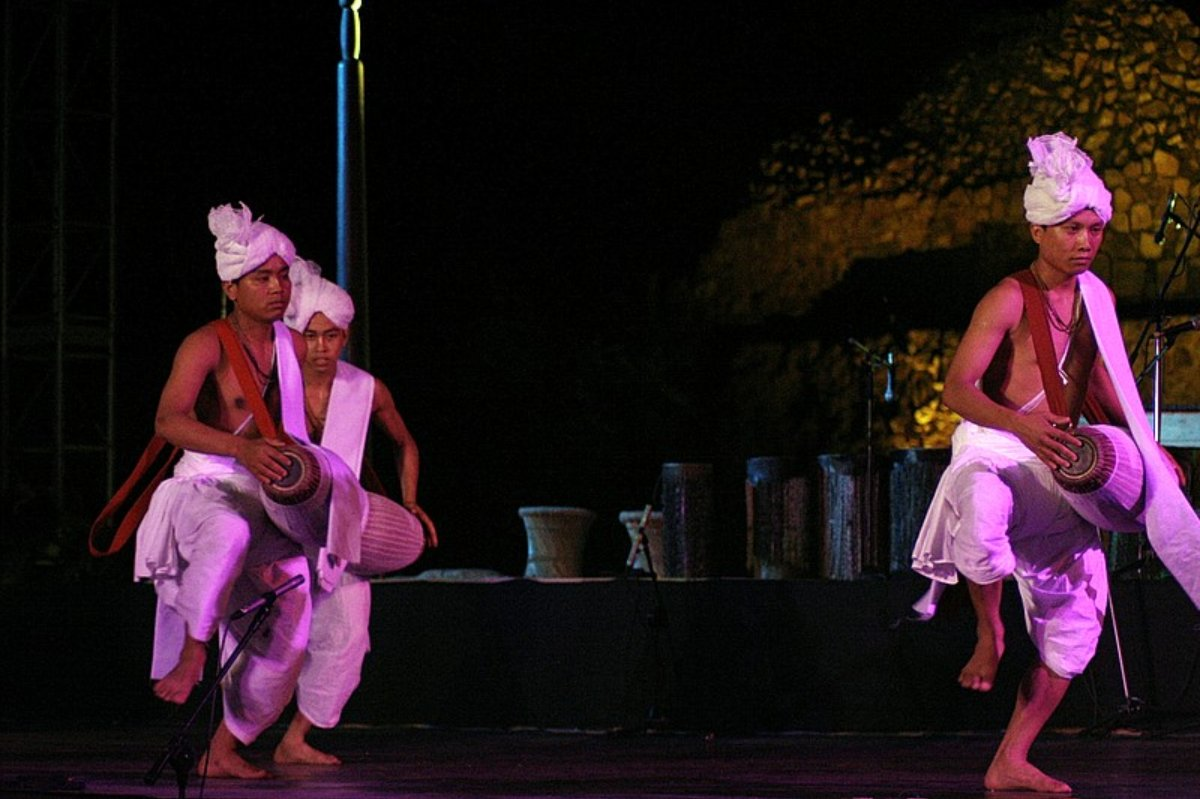
- Clockwise from top: the depictions of events from the classical epic of Khamba Thoibi (Note: The romantic epic of Khamba and Thoibi is a classic in Meitei literature.) and Khamba Thoibi classical dance (Note: The ritualistic and theatrical dances of the Lai Haraoba, in general and one of its primary forms, the Khamba Thoibi Jagoi (Meitei for 'Khamba Thoibi dance') in particular, are also considered to be classical dances.) in the Delhi Republic Day parade, the depiction of Lai Haraoba in the Delhi Republic Day parade, the music of Pena (musical instrument), Pung Cholom (Meitei for 'classical drumming performance') of the Meitei Sankirtana, Armenian stamp illustrating Manipuri classical dance as the "national dance" of India (Note: Manipuri dance form, along with the Armenian Hov Arek, are referred to as the "National Dances" (of India and Armenia respectively) during the Armenia-India joint issue of postage stamps.) (Note: It is the highest spiritual expression of the worship of Hindu deity Krishna, as well as a cultural heritage of the Meitei civilization.)
- Cultural origins: Meitei culture
- Publishers: UNESCO; Union Government of India; Government of Armenia; Government of Manipur; Government of Assam

The intangible cultural heritage (ICH) of Meitei civilization is recognised, honoured, preserved as well as promoted by the UNESCO, the Ministry of Culture of the Union Government of India, the Government of Armenia, the State Government of Manipur, the State Government of Assam, the State Government of Tripura, among many other notable institutions.

== UNESCO's intangible cultural heritage ==
=== Sankirtana, ritual singing, drumming and dancing of Manipur ===
Meitei Sankirtana (under the name of "Sankirtana, ritual singing, drumming and dancing of Manipur"), one of the most remarkable cultural heritage of the Meitei civilization, was formally recognized as a UNESCO's intangible cultural heritage, declared in the eighth session of the UNESCO Intergovernmental Committee in Baku, Azerbaijan, in December 2013.

== National List for Intangible Cultural Heritage (ICH) ==
=== Traditional Craftsmanship ===
==== Music of Pena ====
Pena (musical instrument) is single stringed. It has two parts. One part is a bamboo pole attached to a coconut shell. The other part is the pena cheijing (Meitei for 'chorr'). It acts as a bow used to give friction on the string. A Pena Asheiba/Pena Khongba (Meitei for 'pena player') sings songs while playing the musical instrument. Pena is an inseparable part of Meitei civilization. It is used in ritualistic functions like Lai Haraoba, Lai Ikouba, etc.

==== Applique art ====
In Meitei culture, through the art of applique, decorative effects are achieved by superposing patches of coloured fabrics on a basic fabric, with the stitching of the edges of the patches. This unique art from is distinctively different from the modern day patchwork, in which small pieces of cut clothes are connected side by side, so as to make a bigger form of cloth, or for renovating a ragged cloth. In fact, it is the application of smaller ornaments or devices into bigger articles. It can be particularly seen in costumes of Meitei classical dance forms such as Khamba Thoibi classical dance, Maibi Jagoi (Meitei for 'Priestesses' dance'), etc.

=== Performing arts ===
==== Thok Leela ====
Thok Leela is a traditional Meitei satire, wit and comedy theatre of Manipur. It mocks the social conditions, the royal courtiers and the rulers. The talented actors with their repartee produce mocking, humorous, ironical, exaggerated, comic and rollicking effects. It has no written theatrical texts. It depends on the self generated exercise of the artist's skills, humour and intellect, focusing on the theme for the storyline. The Meitei language word "thok" means 'at random'. Thus, "Thok Leela" means a randomly performed satirical comedy play, with no written scripts and no directors. The only support of the actors is the advice of the elders and the teachers. It is a union of "the critical and the humourist". It produces a big humorous temperament. Its common character includes pastiche. It aims whatever is ridiculous or unseemly.

=== Social practices, rituals and festive events ===
==== Sankirtan ====
Meitei Sankirtana (alias Manipuri Sankirtana) is the artistic manifestation of the worshipping culture of the Meitei people (Manipuri people). It is regarded as the visible form of God, in Meitei culture. Regarding the art form, the Ministry of Culture (India) states the following:

“... Woven within the framework of sacrosanct rituals and ceremonies the art consists of narrative singing and dancing. Always performed in a Mandala (circular area) inside a Mandapa (hall) attached to a temple or erected in a courtyard. The rituals and formalities are strict and even the audience are seated according to set rules. It employs musical instruments like drums and cymbals. The artistes play these instruments and dance at the same time. An artiste spends a life-time specializing only in one aspect.”

— Ministry of Culture (India)

==== Death rites of Phayeng ====
The Chapka Phayeng people of Manipur are a part of the Meitei people itself. But they have a unique culture of burying the death. Shikaplon is a tradition of “requiem and a funeral march”, along with Khousaba (Meitei for 'martial movement'). According to their beliefs, in the afterlife, people go to the Khamnung Sawa (Meitei for 'netherworld') to unite with their ancestors. Among the mourning people during the time of burial, one of them should sing the Shikaplon, which gives instructions to the journey of the dead person to the underworld. The pena (musical instrument) should be played by the singer while singing the Shikaplon.

Another funeral tradition is the accompanying of a very rare martial art form known as Yenpha Khousa. Yenpha Khousa is a form of Ta Khousaba. It is performed by young, close relative of the departed. It is performed with spear and shield.

== National Inventory of ICH ==
The National Inventory of the intangible cultural heritage of India includes some Meitei intangible cultural heritage too, which are Lai Haraoba, folklore of Moirang, Meitei Sankirtana, Shikalpan and Khousaba (ritual ceremony of the dead people of Phayeng caste), and the making of Pena (musical instrument).

== See also ==
- Animals in Meitei civilization
- Birds in Meitei civilization
- Constitutionalism in Meitei civilization
- Hills and mountains in Meitei civilization
- Plants in Meitei civilization
- Women in Meitei civilization
