= Meitei Sankirtana =

Meitei Sankirtan
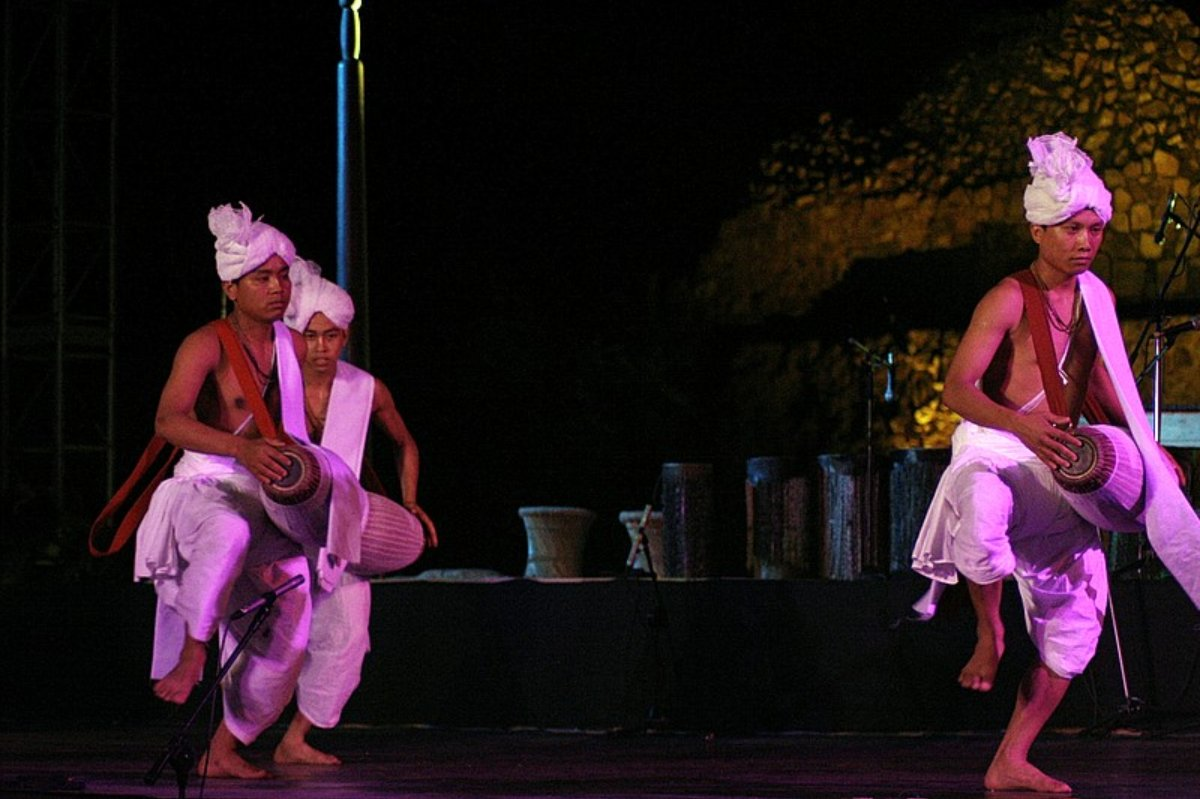
- Medium: Ritual singing, drumming and dancing
- Originating culture: Meitei
- Originating era: 18th century AD – present

Sankirtana, ritual singing, drumming and dancing of Manipur
- UNESCO Intangible Cultural Heritage
- Country: India
- Reference: 00843
- Region: Asia and the Pacific

Inscription history
- Inscription: 2013 (8th session)
- List: Representative

Meitei Sankirtan (Meitei: Meitei Nat Sankirtan), also known as Meitei Sankirtana (Meitei: Meitei Nat Sankirtana) or Manipuri Sankirtan (Meitei: Nat Sonkirton) or Manipuri Sankirtana (Meitei: Nat Sonkirton), is a Meitei intangible cultural heritage, and a performing art form, involving ritual singing, drumming and dancing performed in the temples and domestic spaces in Manipur in India. Through the performances which exhibit unparalleled religious devotion and energy, the performers narrate the many stories of Krishna often moving the spectators to tears. It is practiced primarily by the Meitei Hindus (primarily Vaishnavas) in Manipur and by the Vaishnava Manipuri population settled in the neighbouring States of Tripura and Assam. In December 2013, UNESCO inscribed "Sankirtana: Ritual singing, drumming and dancing of Manipur" in the Representative List of the Intangible Cultural Heritage of Humanity.

Meitei Nat Sankirtana, along with the fusion of three other performing art forms, Huiyen Lallong, Lai Haraoba and Raaslila, gave rise to the Sangeet Natak Akademi-recognised Indian classical dance form, popularly known as the "Manipuri dance".

== An outline of the performance ==
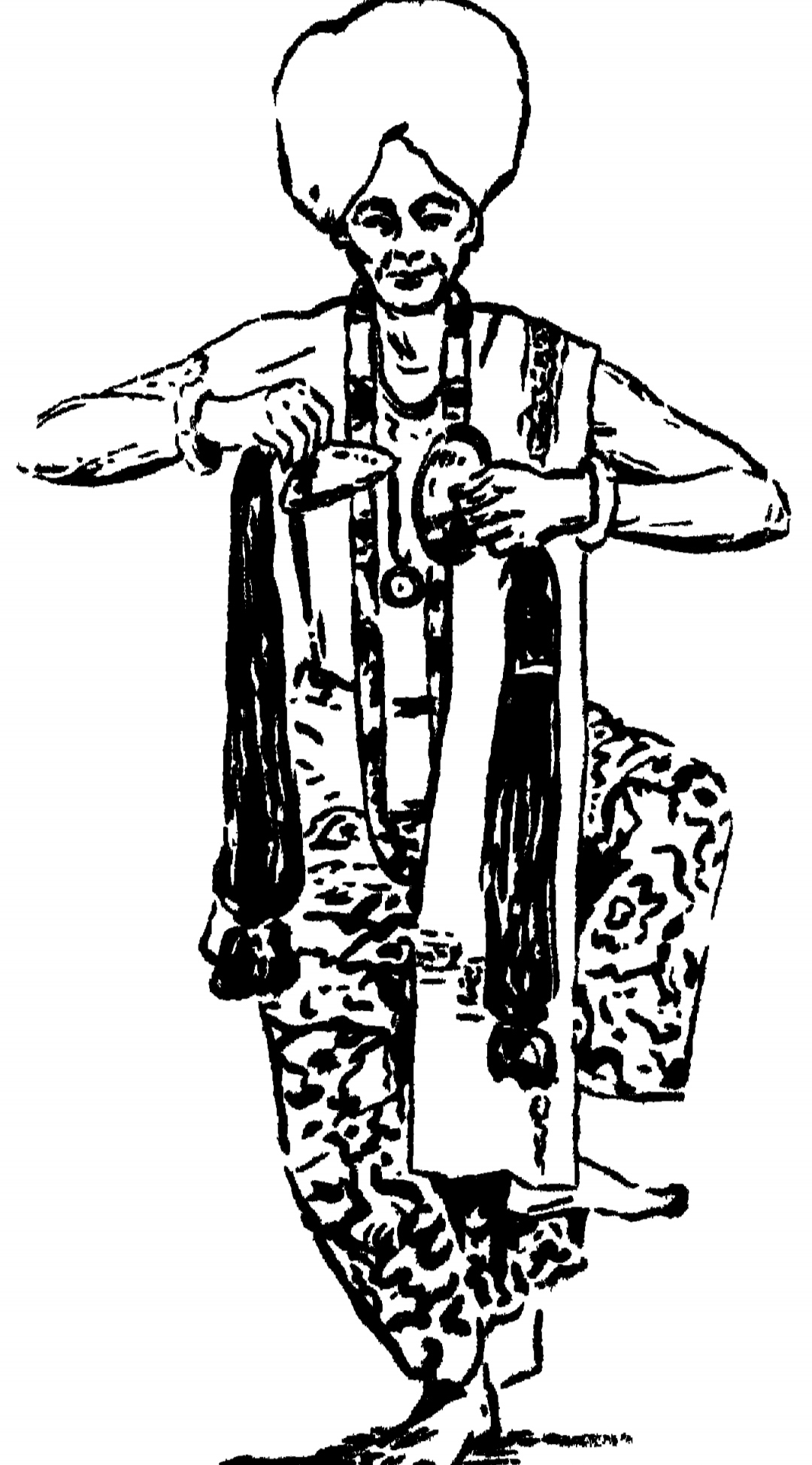
A depiction of Meitei Sankirtan

The Nomination file for Inscription on the Representative List of the Intangible Cultural Heritage of Humanity prepared by Sangeet Natak Akademi describes this performing art thus:

"Starting with ritual observances which involve singing and dancing in the temples of Manipur, Sankirtana encompasses an array of arts performed also in the home and the street to mark occasions of religious import and stages in the life of the Vaishnava people inhabiting the Manipur plains. The theology and lore of Krishna is central to these performances, but they assimilate in their rendering formal features carried over from music and dance in Manipur’s pre-Vaishnavite past. The core of Sankirtana practice is to be found in the temple, where it narrates through song and dance the lives and deeds of the Lord. These are typically presented in the round, in a hall (Mandapa) attached to the temple before devotees. The main repertoire consists of Nata Pala, which is performed all over the Manipur valley. The Ariba Pala and Manohar Sai Pala, less often in evidence today, are also temple-centred. Outside the temple, Sankirtana assumes forms such as the Holi Pala celebrating the festival of colours in springtime or Shayan performed in the winter months. Khubak Eshei is celebrated within the temple during the rains, marking the chariot festival of the Lord. In the setting of the home, Sankirtana is offered as prayer at all life-cycle ceremonies, such as the ear-piercing ritual (for both males and females in childhood), the donning of the sacred thread (for adolescent males), marriage, and the rites of passage at death. Thus pervading the life of the Manipuri Vaishnava, Sankirtana is regarded as the visible manifestation of God."

== See also ==
- Jagoi, the arts of dance in Meitei culture
