= Tharon =

Ancient Meitei treatise

- Original title: Thalon Puya
- Language: Meitei language (Manipuri language)
- Genre: Meitei literature
- Publication place: Kangleipak
- The Tharon is based on the ancient lore of the twelve lunar months of the year.

Thāron (Meitei: Thaaron, lit. 'Knowledge of the Months') is an ancient Meitei language text, about the lore of the twelve lunar months of a year. It is the foundation for the Meitei calendar. It describes the changing pattern of nature in the following months. It is one of the masterpieces of the writers of the ancient times.

== Etymology ==
In Meitei language, "Tha" means month or moon and "ron", derived from "lon" means knowledge, lore or tradition.

== Introduction ==
The text contains an introductory prayer addressed to the presiding ancient Meitei deities. The text is written in an intensely ancient Meitei diction. It is free from the admixture of any foreign languages' words. The author of the book shows deep reverence to the moon. The reason for it is that the moon very much rules the course of every month of the year.

== Origin of the lunar months ==
=== Lamtā ===
In this month, when early flowers bloom, men greet the season by putting on the best of their robes as if to compete with one another. Simultaneously, the ladies too do at their best, beautifully bedecked with the most beautiful hairstyles. And both are irresistibly going towards the open places. They were mad as a March hare for satisfying themselves by performing in dances and music.

In accordance to the text, during this month, the grasses are becoming more and more greenish with their blades becoming thicker and thicker, entwined with one another. New sprouts have come up on last year's dry branches of trees. Different birds nesting by the human settlements flew in search of new fruits, with which many a tree now abound.

It is in this month that once the Meitei prince Ngangoi Yoimongpa entrapped his quarry, a big deer and also Sarathemba, the young Mayang could round up enough number of games for a ritual festival.

=== Poinu ===
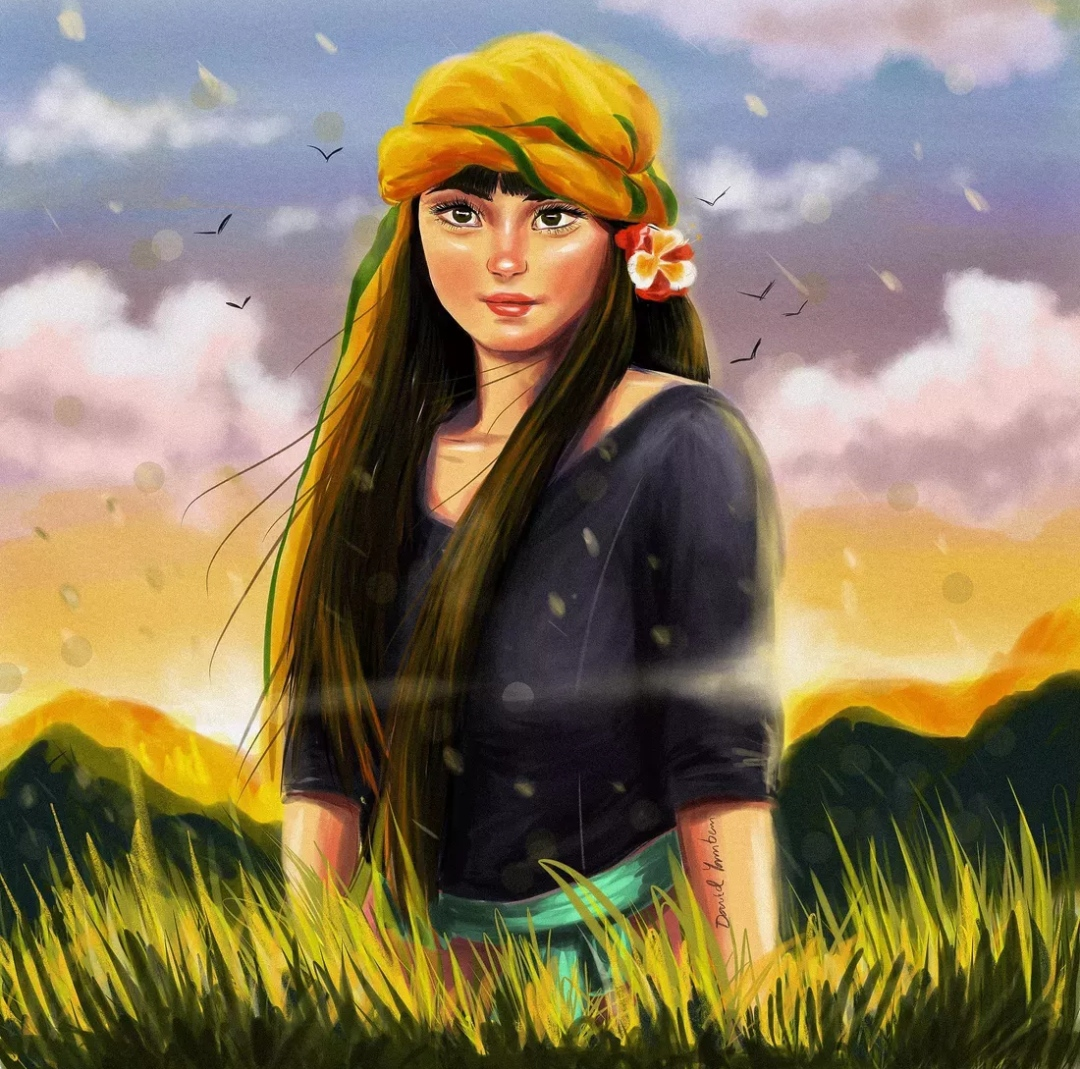
Meitei woman in the paddy field as described in the text

The text describes how the name of the month Poinu was called so. When the Almighty God had intended to test the intelligence of His divine sons. As a part of the test, disguised as a dead ox, He floated down the stream of the Kurum Ching rising from Kangla, the ancient capital. Seeing this, the youngest son could identify his father because he was more devoted to his Sire, in comparison to other siblings. So, it is called the cold month of Poinu during which the golden hued ears of the paddy crop, the very form of a goddess as it sustains the species, droop soon to be reaped in handfuls by the bent sickle with seven hundred and sixty-one notches. During this month, the cut paddies are kept in small heaps on bamboo mats by the womenfolk. During the activities, the ladies are described as their loins girded with bands of cloth. The paddies are said to be thrashed and winnowed by strong young men after the piled-up rice being constantly turned over with a wooden shovel. Later, the grains are described as collected in big baskets with attached handles and carried to the royal granary.

After the harvest, Kings used to perform religious rites and rituals dedicated to Phouoibi, the ancient Meitei goddess of agriculture, crops, fertility, grains, harvesting, paddy, rice and wealth, showing her reverence as well as gratitude for providing the mankind their foods.

== Twelve months ==
The names of the twelve lunar months were given in Ancient Meitei language in the manuscript. However, the following illustrates both the Ancient Meitei as well as Modern Meitei names, with their Gregorian equivalents:

Ancient Meitei	Latin-Roman transliteration	Modern Meitei	Latin-Roman transliteration	Gregorian equivalents
ꯁꯆꯤꯐꯣꯢ (ꯆꯤꯟꯄꯤ)	Sachiphoy (Chinpi)	ꯁꯖꯤꯕꯨ	Sajibu	Apr-May
ꯀꯥꯟꯄꯤ	Kaanpee	ꯀꯥꯂꯦꯟ	Kalen	May-Jun
ꯑꯁꯥꯎ	Asaau	ꯏꯉꯥ	Ee-ngaa	Jun-Jul
ꯍꯥꯂꯦꯡ	Haaleng	ꯏꯉꯦꯟ	Ee-ngen	Jul-Aug
ꯋꯥꯟꯇꯠ	Waantat	ꯊꯧꯋꯥꯟ	Thouwaan	Aug-Sept
ꯑꯆꯤꯠ (ꯂꯥꯡꯄꯟ)	Achit (Laangpan)	ꯂꯥꯡꯕꯟ	Laangban	Sept-Oct
ꯑꯥꯂꯦ (ꯃꯦꯂꯥ)	Aale (Melaa)	ꯃꯦꯔꯥ	Meraa	Oct-Nov
ꯆꯤꯛꯊꯝ (ꯍꯤꯌꯥꯡꯀꯩ)	Chiktham (Hiyaangkei)	ꯍꯤꯌꯥꯡꯒꯩ	Heeyaangei	Nov-Dec
ꯎꯟꯊꯝ	Untham	ꯄꯣꯢꯅꯨ	Poinu	Dec-Jan
ꯏꯟꯊꯝ	Eentham	ꯋꯥꯛꯆꯤꯡ	Waakching	Jan-Feb
ꯑꯁꯤꯠ (ꯐꯥꯢꯂꯦꯜ)	Ashit (Phailel)	ꯐꯥꯢꯔꯦꯜ	Fairel	Feb-Mar
ꯊꯥꯄꯤ	Thaapee	ꯂꯝꯇꯥ	Lamta	Mar-Apr
