= Khamba Thoibi Jagoi =

Traditional Meitei classical dance

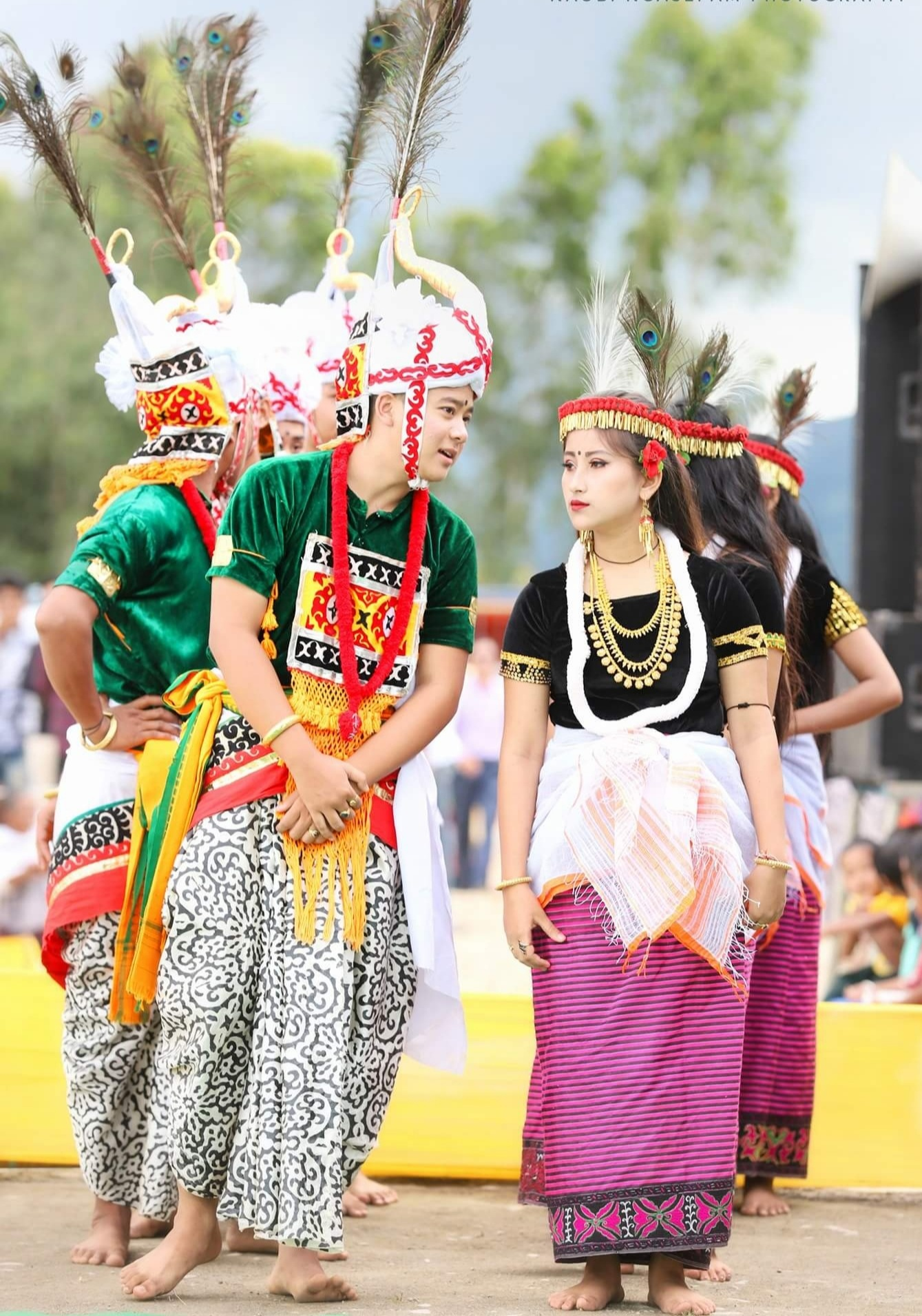
- Male and female dancers, re-enacting the story of Khuman Khamba and Moirang Thoibi
- Native name: Meitei: ꯈꯝꯕ ꯊꯣꯢꯕꯤ ꯖꯒꯣꯢ
- Genre: jagoi, classical dance, theatre dance
- Origin: Kingdom of Moirang

Khamba Thoibi dance (Meitei: ꯈꯝꯕ ꯊꯣꯢꯕꯤ ꯖꯒꯣꯢ, romanized: Khamba Thoibi jagoi), also known as Khamba Thoibi classical dance or Khamba Thoibi ballet, is a traditional Meitei dance performance that tells the tale of princess Thoibi and her lover Khamba, and is dedicated to the god Thangching, the national deity of the medieval kingdom Keke Moirang. It is one of the elements that inspired the development of the Manipuri Raas Leela, a later form of Indian classical dance drama.

The dance is popularly believed to be first performed by Khuman Khamba and Moirang Thoibi, in the presence of Thangjing.

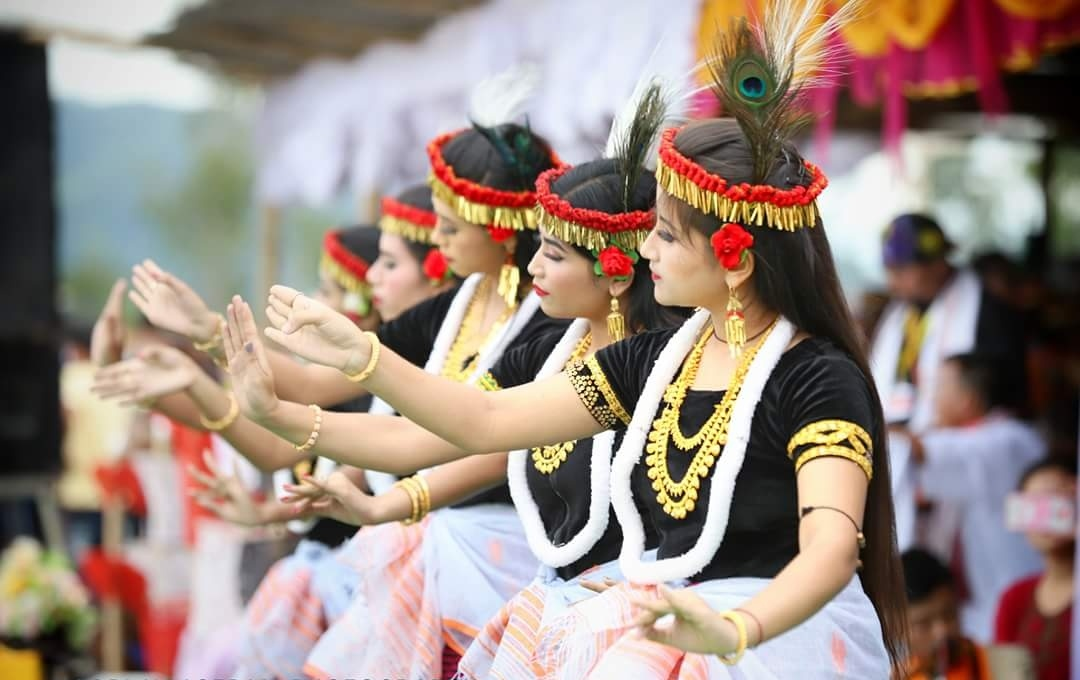
Women performing the Khamba Thoibi jagoi

== Origin ==
In the Kingdom of Moirang, King Koyamba asked Khuman Khamba and his rival Nongban to bring rare orchids the mountains for the Lai Haraoba festival, in honour of the god Thangching. Overcoming great difficulty and with great care, Khamba brought the finest flowers from the wilds; Nongban, encountering no difficulty at all, but brought flowers that were damaged due to his carelessness. Nongba offered the flowers first to the King and then to others; Khamba, being a humble man, took the advice of a priestess, and set flowers first before Thangching, and then offered them to the King, the Queen, and the high officers of kingdom. Pleased with Khamba's courtesy and decorum, the royals and nobles presented him with rare gifts, many times more than the customary presents which Kongyamba received.

After Nongban and his wives had danced, Khamba and his lover Thoibi danced and sang before Thangching, and the people gathered round and shouted with joy as they danced, whirling together till at last they knelt in salutation before the God.

== Modern dance drama ==
In the 1960s, Mrs. Vimala Raina composed a new dance drama, based on the traditional story of Khamba and Thoibi. It was performed for the first time on 1 January 1960.

== See also ==
- Festival of Moirang Shai
- Leima Jagoi
- Moirang Sai
