= Leima Jagoi =

Dance form of the Meitei people

Leima Jagoi (Meitei: ꯂꯩꯃ ꯖꯒꯣꯢ) (literally, "Queen's dance" or "Dance of the Lairembi") is a dance form of the Meitei people of Manipur. It is adored with slow and gentle motions of the dancer. It is performed mainly in the religious festival of Lai Haraoba. The dance form is traditionally performed in presence of royalty by noblewomen. It is also presented by a group of village leishabis (maidens) after the Hoi Lauba ceremony.

The Leima Jagoi dance form is developed by the maibas (priests) and the maibis (priestesses) with the high level of artistic performance. Thus, it can hardly be classified as a folk dance form.

== Related pages ==
- Maibi Jagoi

== Other websites ==
- http://www.manipur.org/news/tag/leima-jagoi/
- http://www.e-pao.net/epGallery.asp?id=1&src=Arts_Dances/Manipuri_Dance_Gallery/JNMDA201804_1
- http://www.e-pao.net/epGallery.asp?id=1&src=Arts_Dances/LaiHaraoba/KhunthokLeima20160515
- http://www.e-pao.net/epGallery.asp?id=4&src=Festival/SangaiFestival/Day4Leima20171125
- http://www.e-pao.net/epGallery.asp?id=22&src=News_Related/Archived_News_Photo/NewsPhotoArchive_2015_6
- https://narthaki.com/info/rev07/rev470.html
