= Maibi Jagoi =

Ritual dance by Maibis

Maibi Jagoi or Maibi Dance is a shamanic ritual dance performed by Maibis mostly during Lai Haraoba ceremony for the forest deities of Manipur. Maibism or Maibi culture is a dominant feature of Sanamahism.They are considered as medium between human and spirits. A woman may become a maibi at any age at any time. Being a maibi depend on being chosen by the Lai. The maibis get trained in dance, music chanting, and complex ritual procedures. The spiritual partners of maibis are male maibas who were also trained in ancient lore, spirit, incarnation and psycho analytic methods.

== Gallery ==
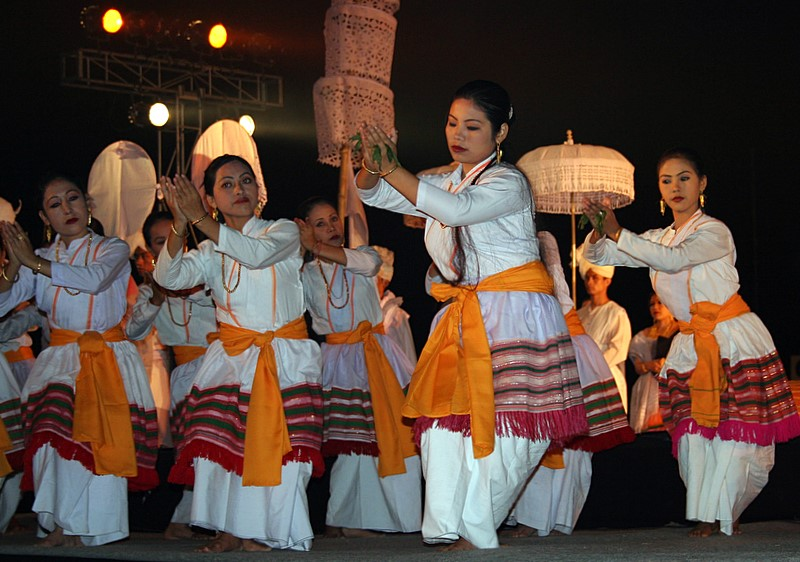

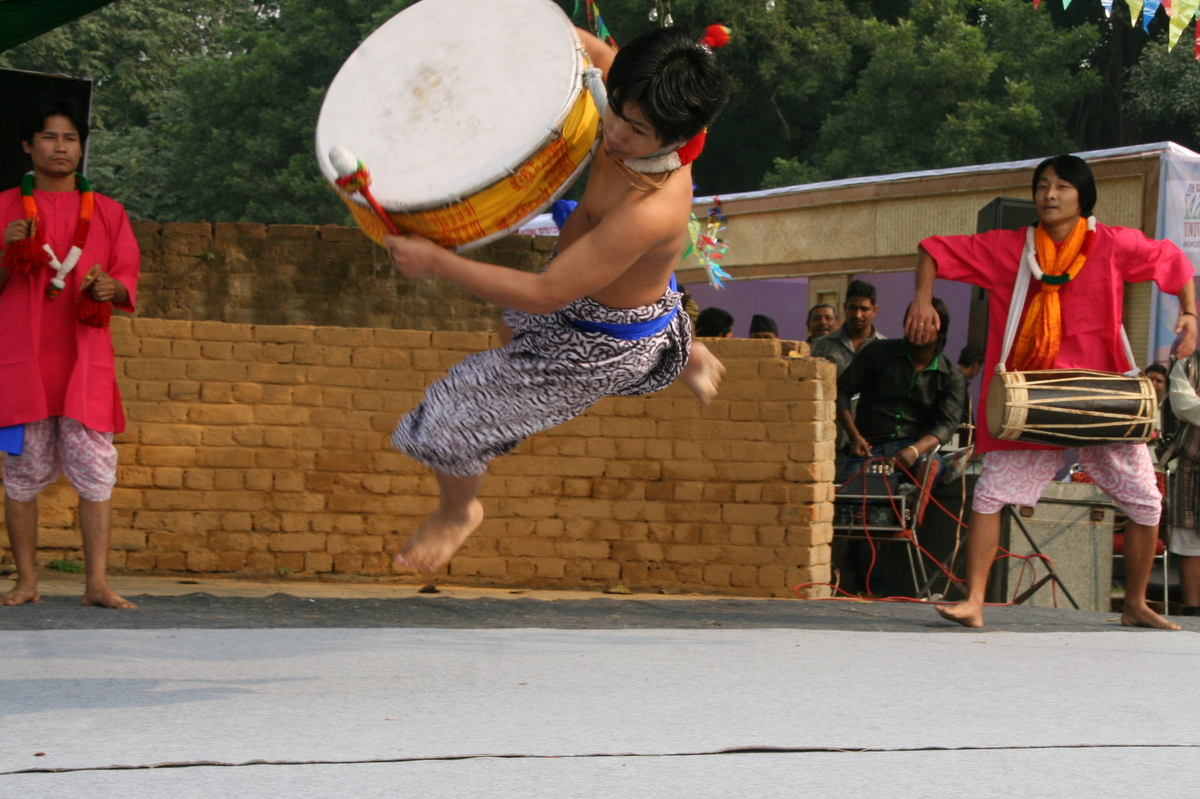
