= Jagoi =

Meitei language word for traditional Meitei dance forms

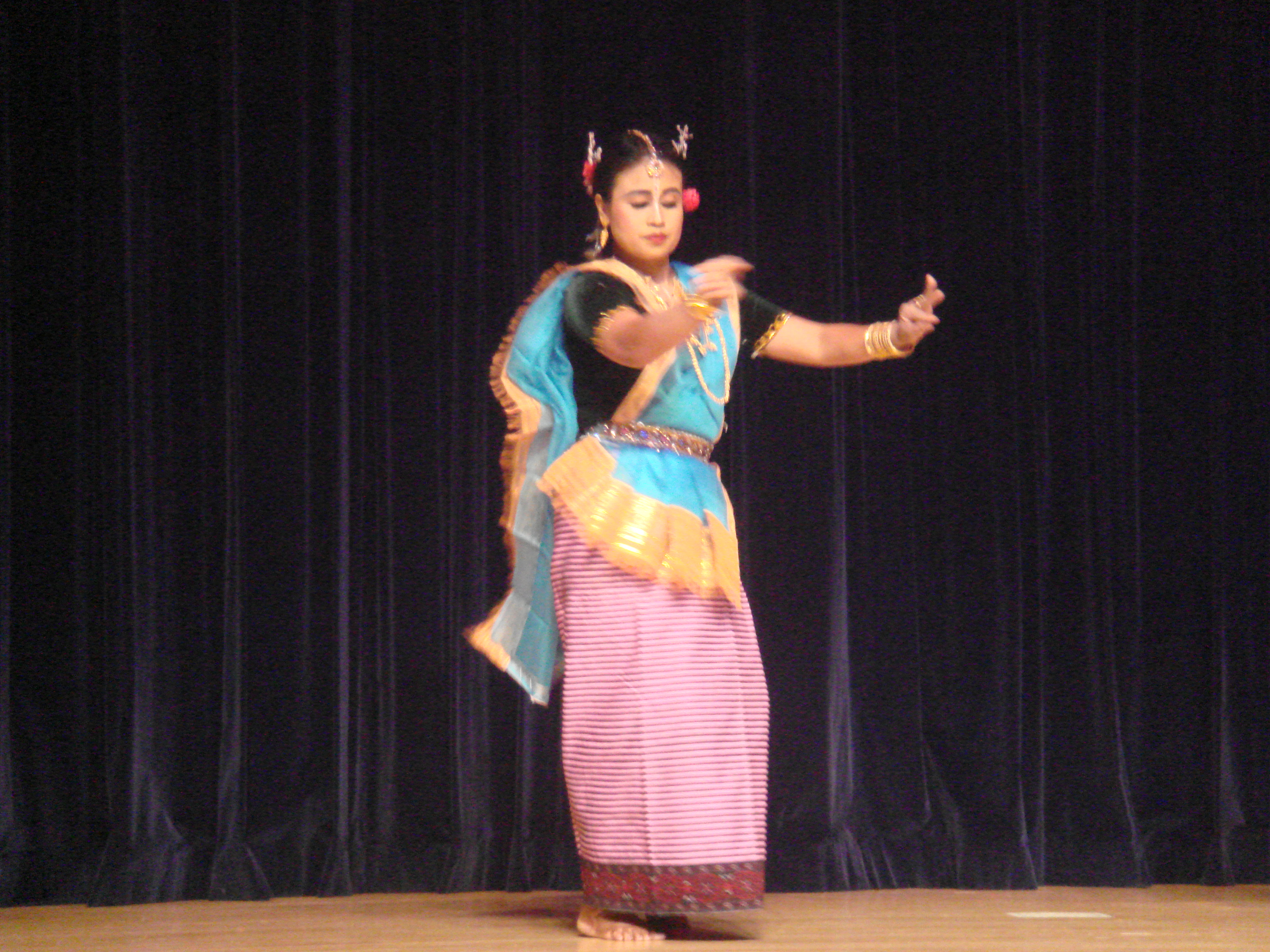
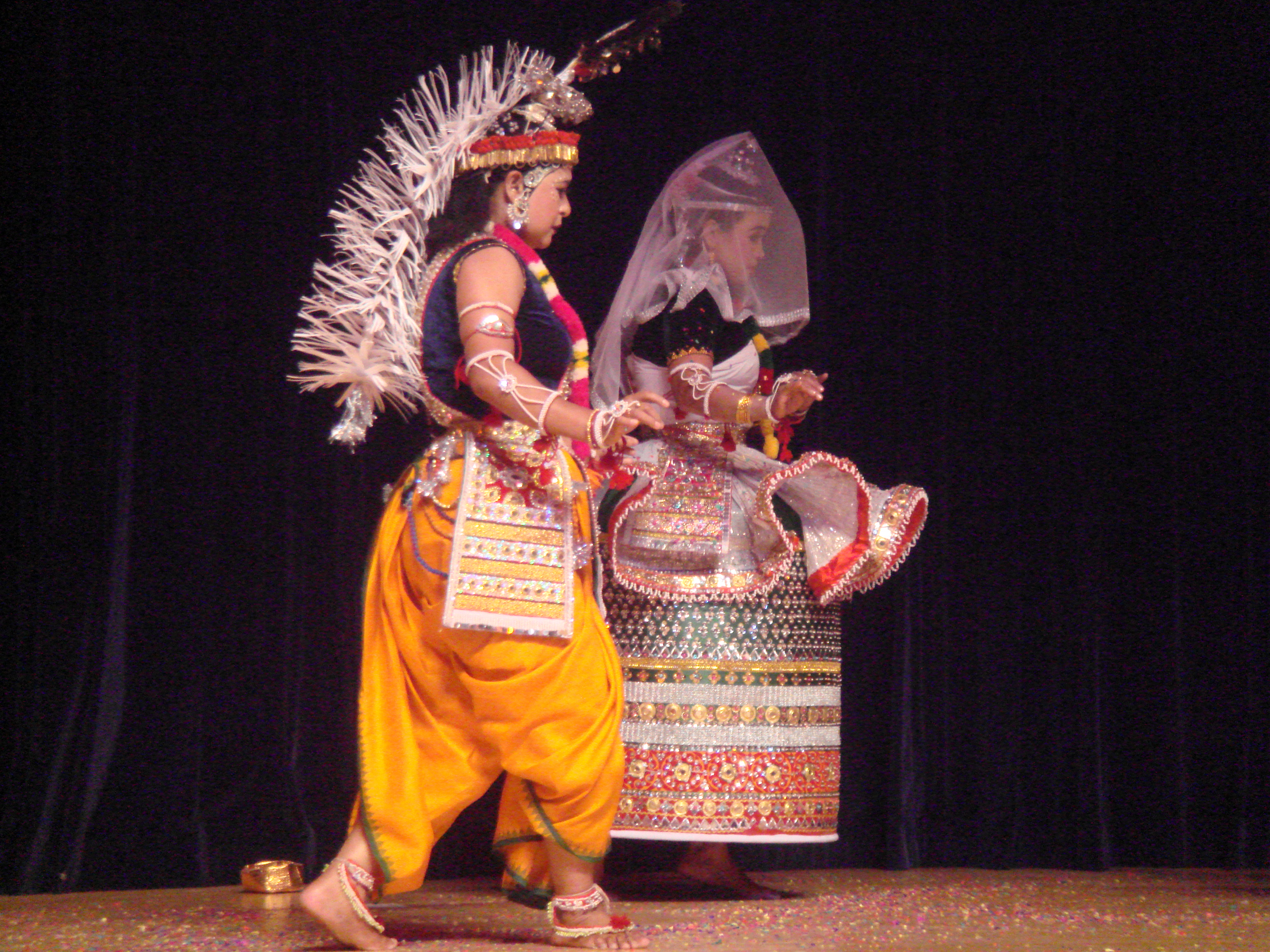
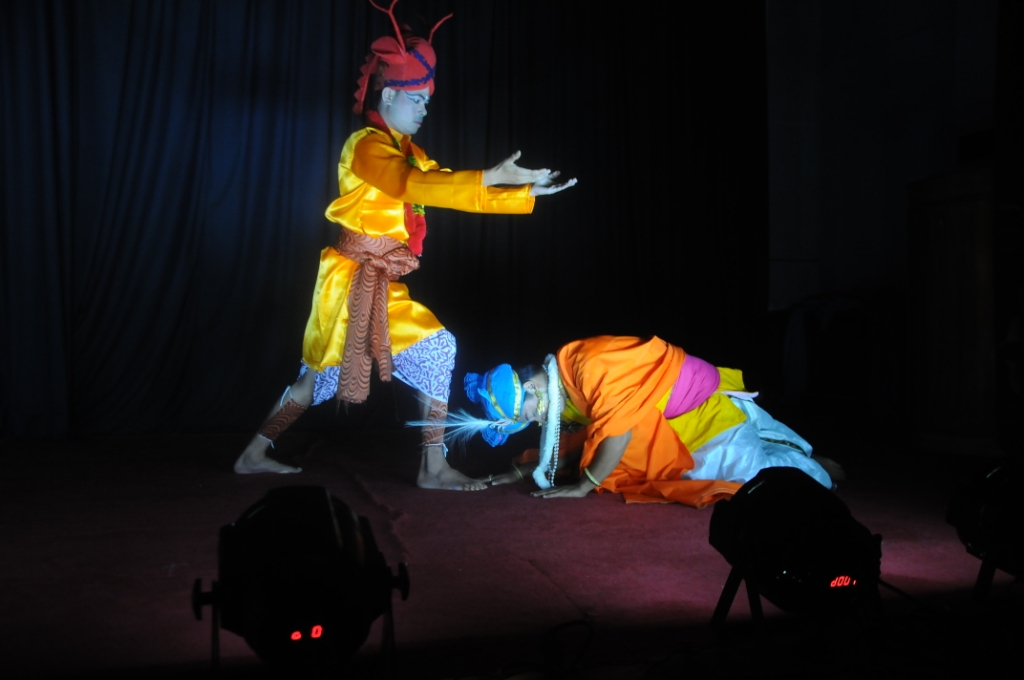
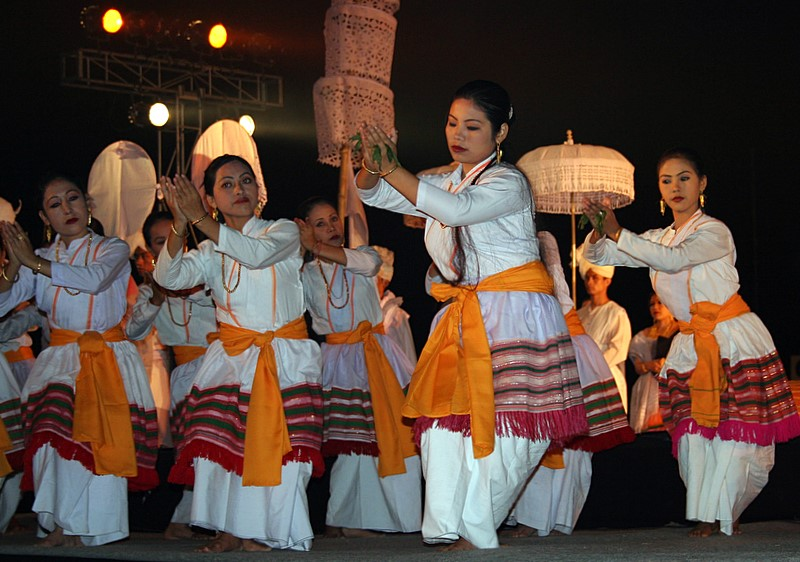
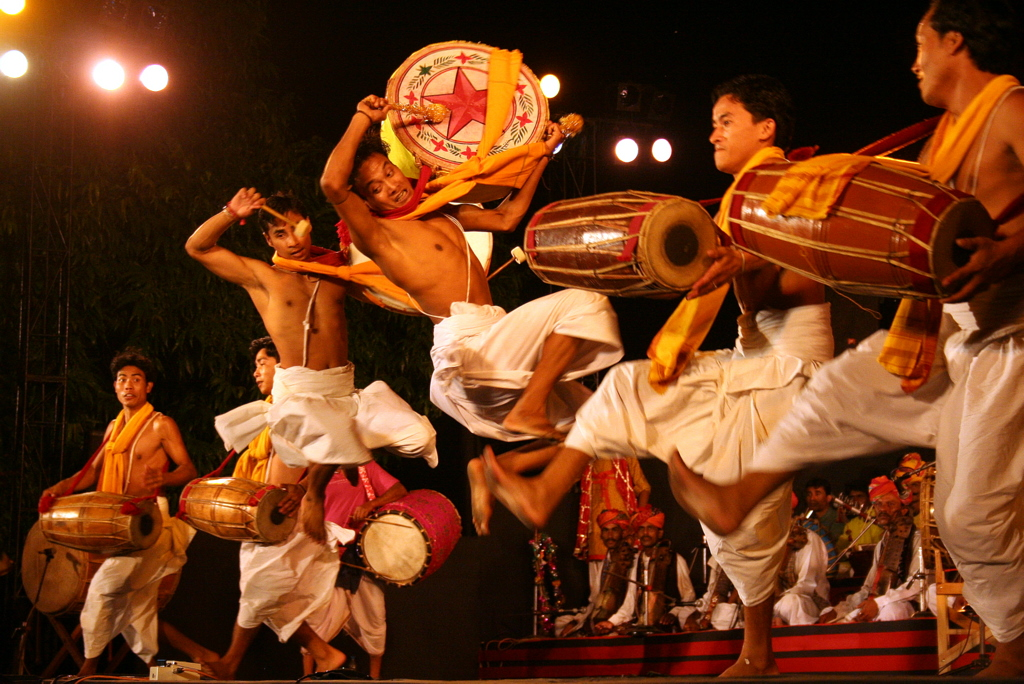
- Different jagois (Meitei dances) of various genres of both Meitei Hindus as well as traditional Meitei religion followers (Sanamahists)
- Native name: ꯖꯒꯣꯏ (Meitei); Chatkoi (Old Manipuri)
- Instrument: Pena
- Origin: Kangleipak (Meitei for 'Manipur')

Jagoi (Meitei: ꯖꯒꯣꯏ; Old Manipuri: ꯆꯠꯀꯣꯏ, romanized: Chatkoi) refers to the arts of dance in Meitei culture.

== General rules and guidelines ==
=== Eye contact ===
In the performances of traditional Meitei dances, dancers are strictly forbidden not to have any forms of eye contact with the audiences. If it is not followed properly, then it is considered as a sacrilege.

== Chukpharon Jagoi ==
"Chukpharon Jagoi" is a Sanamahist ritual dance form performed by the maibis (priestesses) to please the lords of the four directions, Thangjing, Marjing, Wangbren, and Koubru, in the religious festival of Lai Haraoba. During the performance, the maibi takes the two ekouphus (pots) from the laipubas, holding the Lainingthou ekouphu in the right hand and the Lairembi ekouphu in the left hand. The dance performance portrays the dance of goddess Nongthang Leima, who saves the universe from destruction.

== Laiching Jagoi ==
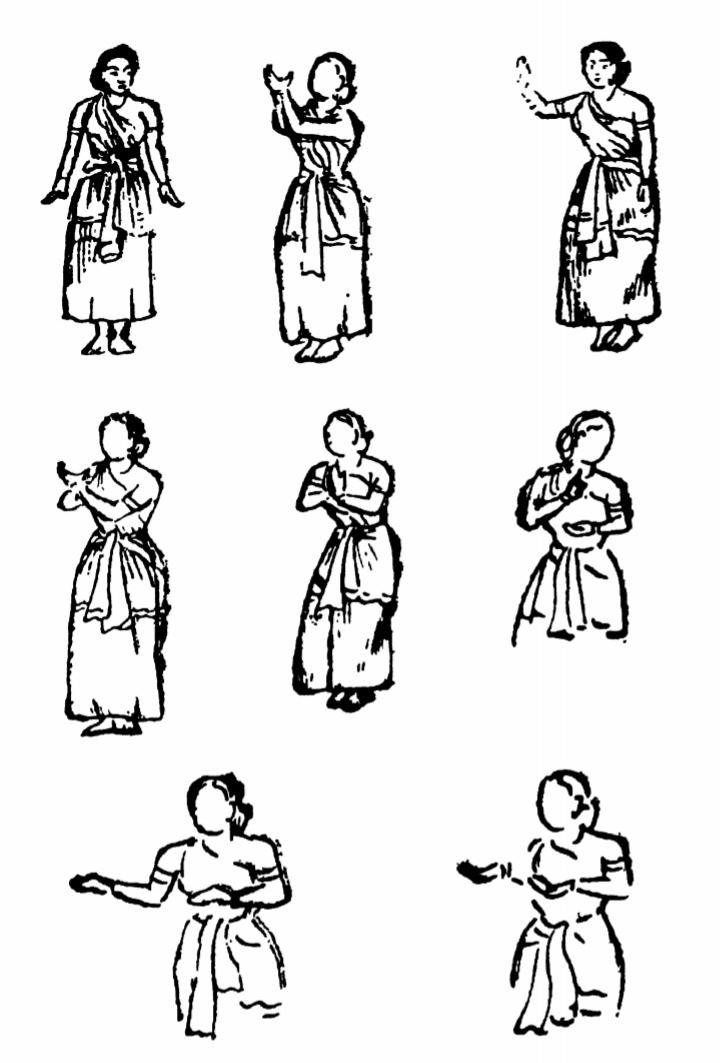
Illustration of the dance

Laiching Jagoi (Meitei: ꯂꯥꯢꯆꯤꯡ ꯖꯒꯣꯢ) (literally, 'Dance of summoning the deity') is a dance form performed by the maibis (priestesses) with the langthrei (a special leaf of Blumea balsamifera) held between their fingers. This sequence involves a variety of expressive movements where the spirit of the deity is invited to enter each maibi's body. It is an invocatory dance where the maibis stand with their hands in a pose symbolizing women's union. In this dance form, the maibis, after invoking the deities from water, perform leitai nongdai jagoi. This dance form is performed in front of the shrine of the deities.

== Laihou Jagoi ==
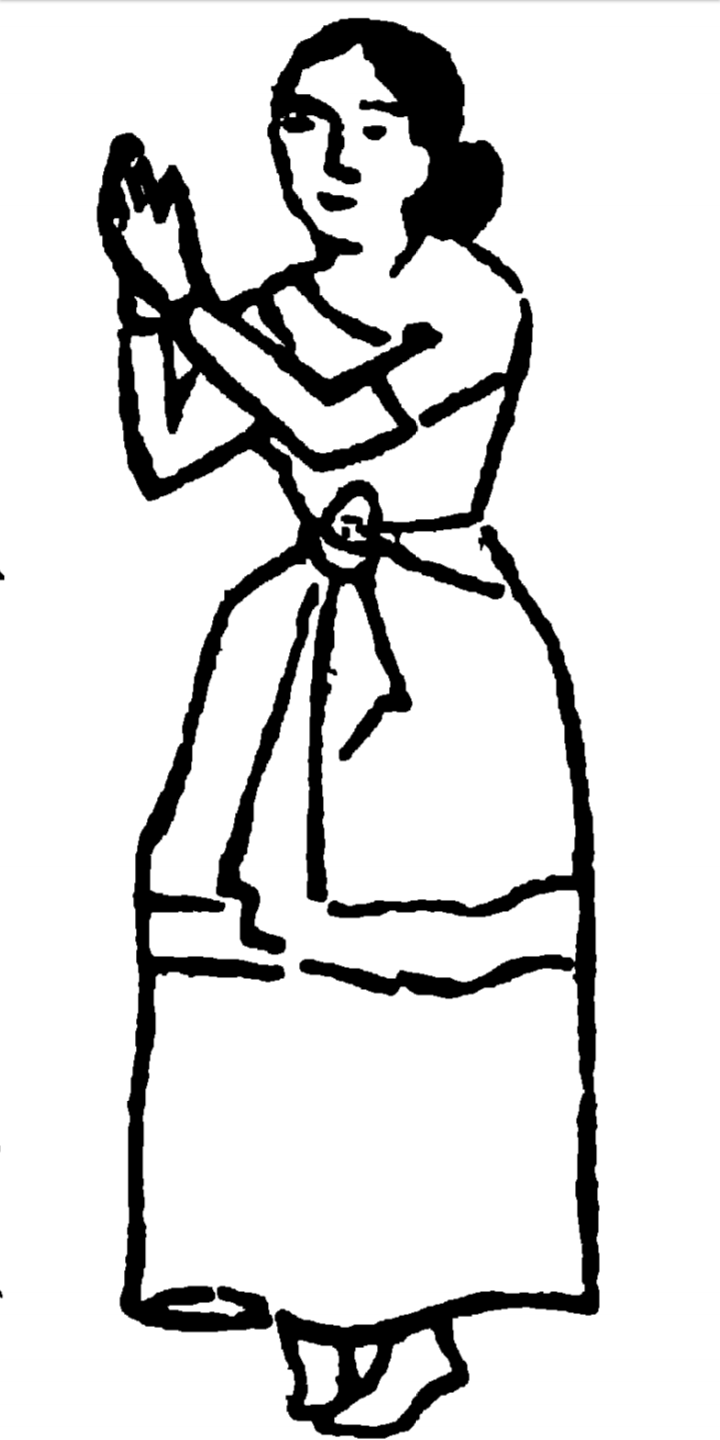
Illustration of the dance

Laihou Jagoi (Meitei: ꯂꯥꯢꯍꯧ ꯖꯒꯣꯢ) (literally,'dance of invitation' or "opening dance") is a dance form performed by the maibis (priestesses) to lead a way to a pond or river, in the religious festival of Lai Haraoba.

During the performance of the dance, the tune of the pena, a traditional musical instrument, is also shrimmed up.

With the maibis, the sword bearing youths in two rows, the maidens with the brass vessels, the Lai bearers, the isaiphu bearers, the chong (umbrella) bearers accompany the pibas (men) holding the two pots.

== Leisem Jagoi ==
Leisem Jagoi (Meitei: ꯂꯩꯁꯦꯝ ꯖꯒꯣꯢ) (literally, 'Dance of creation of the earth') is a dance form enacted by imitating the movements of nine gods and seven goddesses creating the earth, followed by Laibou Jagoi, depicting the creation of human body and various activities of man, like weaving of clothes. The sequence of the dance is performed by the Ningol Macha (girls). The six original forms of the dance are leishem, leitai, nongdai, leipekpa, leihouba and leipiba. It is one of the early dance forms of Ancient Manipur contributing to the rich Manipur's classical wealth of culture.

== Panthoibi Jagoi ==
Panthoibi Jagoi (Meitei: ꯄꯥꯟꯊꯣꯢꯕꯤ ꯖꯒꯣꯢ) (literally, 'Panthoibi's dance' or 'Dance dedicated to the Divine Mother') is a duet dance form, portraying the romantic love affairs between Nongpok Ningthou and Panthoibi. There are 14 hand gestures with bodily movements. It is performed in the religious festival of Lai Haraoba, depicting the weaving process. In the dance form, Marjing has been conflated with Nongpok Ningthou. Nowadays, the dance form is replaced by the Khamba Thoibi Jagoi.

== Raas Jagoi ==
The Manipuri classical dance, also known to as the Manipuri Raas Leela dance (Meitei: Jagoi Raas/Raas Jagoi), is one of the eight major Indian classical dance forms, originating from the state of Manipur.

== Thougal Jagoi ==
Thougal Jagoi (Meitei: ꯊꯧꯒꯜ ꯖꯒꯣꯢ) (literally, 'Dance of dedication') or "Jagoi Ashangbi" (Meitei: ꯖꯒꯣꯢ ꯑꯁꯥꯡꯕꯤ) is a Meitei traditional dance form, performed by men and women, along with maibis (priestesses) to invoke the deities. It is performed in the religious festival of Lai Haraoba. The performance lasts for half an hour, after which the "Hoi Lauba" ceremony is enacted.

== In popular culture ==
- Raj Nartaki - 1941 Indian Hindi language film
- Yelhou Jagoi - 1995 non-feature Indian Meitei language documentary film

== See also ==
- Lai Haraoba and Umang Lai
- Moirang Sai
- Indian classical dance
- Nritya
- Dances of Manipur

== Bibliography ==
- Williams, Drid (2004). "In the Shadow of Hollywood Orientalism: Authentic East Indian Dancing" (PDF). Visual Anthropology. 17 (1). Routledge: 69–98. doi:10.1080/08949460490274013. S2CID 29065670. Archived from the original (PDF) on 2016-03-04.
