= Namungbi =

Namungbi (ꯅꯃꯨꯡꯕꯤ / ꯅꯥꯃꯨꯡꯕꯤ), also written as Namungpi (ꯅꯃꯨꯡꯄꯤ / ꯅꯥꯃꯨꯡꯄꯤ)(transl. supreme), is the mother of the deified princess Panthoibi. She is an important character in the classical Meitei language literary work Panthoibi Naheron (Panthoibi Naheirol). In the story, Namungbi plays an important role during the time Panthoibi pretends to be sick in order to leave her married home. She is a caring and attentive mother. Her character shows the strong connection between Panthoibi and her family. Although she does not realize her daughter's plan at first, she still plays a key part in helping Panthoibi reunite with her true love.

Since Panthoibi is mentioned as a Meitei princess (tampha wangamlon) and a daughter of a ruler of the Ningthouja dynasty in the Panthoibi Khonggul manuscript text, her mother is assumed to be a queen or a queen consort of the Ningthouja royal family.

== Role ==
Namungbi appears when her daughter, Panthoibi, returns to her parental home after leaving the house of Taram Khoinucha, her husband from the Khaba clan. Panthoibi pretends to be seriously ill and asks her mother for help, claiming to be under the spell of an evil spirit. She describes strong pain in her body and confusion in her mind. Namungbi responds with concern and suggests several powerful gods who might be able to heal her daughter.

== Suggestions of healers ==
Namungbi first suggests Wangbaren Khana Chaoba (Wangpulen), the water god of the southern valley. When Panthoibi's condition worsens, she suggests another god from the south-west direction. Finally, she suggests Koubru (Koupalu), the lord of the north-west hill ranges.

Each time Namungbi mentions a new healer, Panthoibi claims her illness is becoming worse. Final healer mentioned was Nongpok Ningthou. At last, Namungbi names Nongpok Ningthou, the Lord of the Langmai Hills. She says that he is a powerful ruler who once defeated Kyang of Burma and is known to be a healer for all people. Panthoibi immediately agrees and insists that he is the only one who can cure her. She describes his power and speed, saying he can walk on clouds and circle the world seven times a day.

Namungbi then calls Nongpok Ningthou. He appears instantly, treats Panthoibi, and helps her recover. After this, Panthoibi leaves with him to live together in love.

== See also ==
- Khaba Sokchrongba
- Panthoibi Iratpa
- Chada Laihui
- List of Khuman queens
- Meitei queens of Tripura
- Meitei goddesses
