= Panthoibi Naheron =

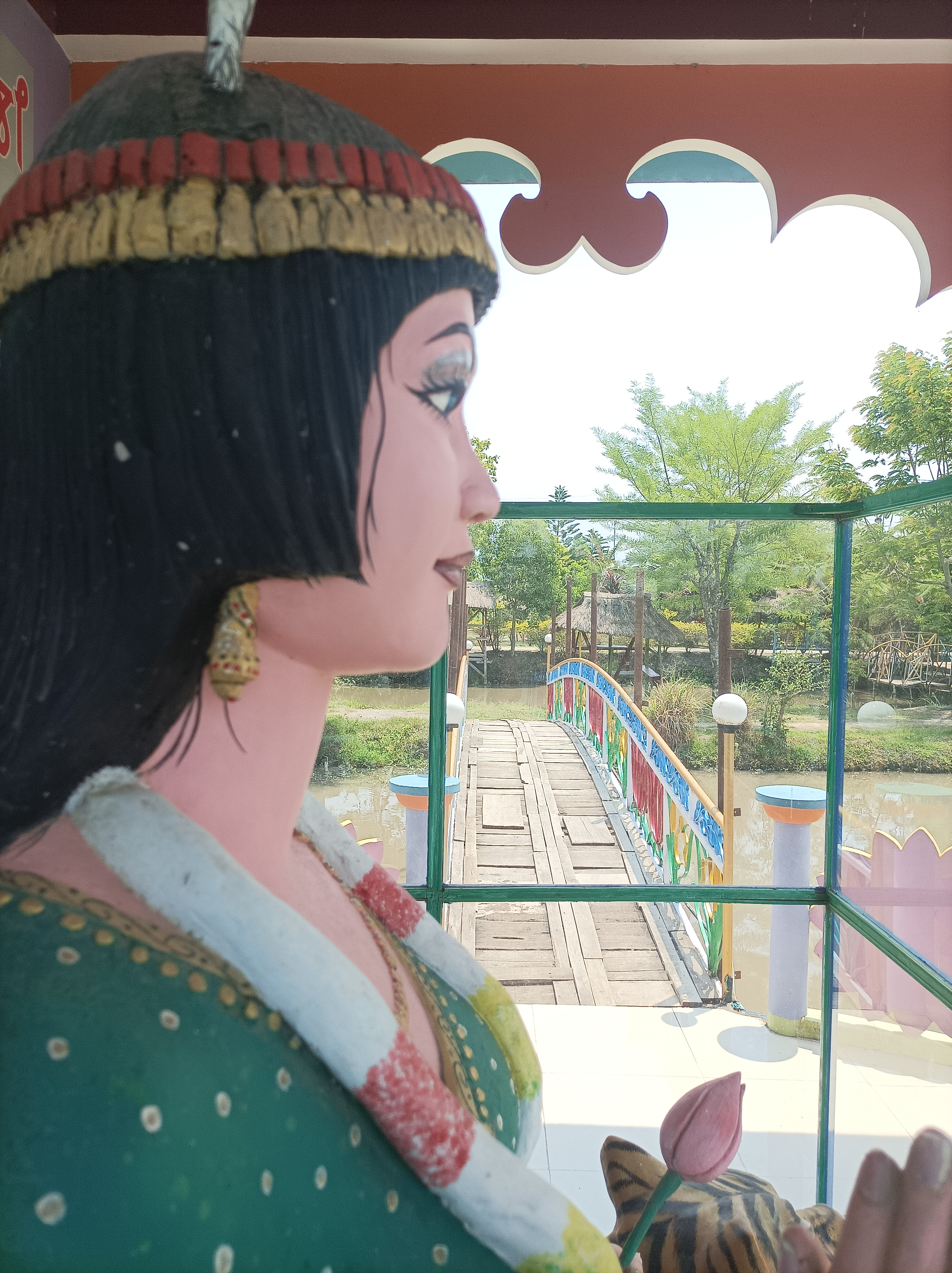
Deified Princess Panthoibi of the Ningthouja royal family

The Panthoibi Naheron (ꯄꯥꯟꯊꯣꯏꯕꯤ ꯅꯥꯍꯦꯔꯣꯟ), also known as the Panthoibi Naheiron (ꯄꯥꯟꯊꯣꯏꯕꯤ ꯅꯥꯍꯩꯔꯣꯟ), or the Panthoibi Naherol (ꯄꯥꯟꯊꯣꯏꯕꯤ ꯅꯥꯍꯦꯔꯣꯜ), or the Panthoibi Naheirol (ꯄꯥꯟꯊꯣꯏꯕꯤ ꯅꯥꯍꯩꯔꯣꯜ) (transl. Panthoibi's incantations), is a classical Meitei language short literary work that tells the story of Panthoibi, a goddess in love. The story shows her emotions in a realistic and sometimes humorous way. It is not a retelling of an earlier work named the Panthoibi Khonggul but an original work of its own. It focuses only on one part of Panthoibi’s love story and uses simple language.

A manuscript textual version of the Panthoibi Naheron in the Meitei language, written on handmade paper material consists of 44 rolls, 264 folios, and 14 records, and is preserved in the Pt. N. Khelchandra Singh Collection, Imphal.

Another manuscript of the Panthoibi Naheiron, in the Meitei language and written in Meitei Mayek script, written on handmade paper and consisting of 34 pages in scroll form, with roll number 9 and record number 130, is preserved in the Dian Chandra Singh Collection.

== Story overview ==
In the tale, Panthoibi leaves the house of her husband Taram Khoinucha, who belongs to the Khaba-Nganba clan. She does this by using a frightening trick. After leaving, she returns to stay with her parents. From there, she later goes to the Langmai Hills (modern day Nongmaiching Ching) to be with her lover, Nongpok Ningthou.

== Meeting Nongpok Ningthou ==
At the beginning of the story, the writer briefly refers to Panthoibi's powerful nature and changing character. This reflects the problems between her and the Khaba royal family, leading to the end of her married life. During this time, she meets Kainou Chingsomba, also known as Nongpok Ningthou, the Lord of the Langmai Hills. He comes down in disguise while hunting.

They fall in love at first sight. Nongpok Ningthou asks Panthoibi why she married the Khaba prince and urges her to come with him. Following his advice, she returns to her parents' house and pretends to be ill.

== Illness and its healers ==
Panthoibi tells her mother, Namungbi, that she is suffering from a mysterious illness:

"O mother, how have I fallen under the spell of an evil spirit? My body aches all over. I feel as if I climbed a steep hill and fell into a deep gorge... Is there any healer who can cure me?"

Namungbi suggests the name of Wangbaren Khana Chaoba (Wangpulen), the water god of the southern valley. But Panthoibi’s condition worsens after hearing his name. Then Namungbi mentions another god from the south-west. Again, Panthoibi's condition gets worse.

Finally, her mother suggests Koubru (Koupalu), the god of the north-west hills. This too makes Panthoibi feel even more unwell.

=== Naming Nongpok Ningthou ===
At last, Namungbi names Nongpok Ningthou:

"O daughter, in the eastern region there is one who defeated Kyang of Burma. His power reaches far to the north. He is also known as a great healer for everyone. Let me call him."

Panthoibi responds:

"Because of the harsh words of the Khabas, I am near death. I have a headache, pain in my back, and I feel like I did at the creation of the earth. O mother, have you forgotten how I helped you form the world from the void? It is time you repay me. Please bring me the best healer you know."

She adds:

"There is one who rules the Langmai Hills where the sun first shines. He is so strong he walks on clouds and circles the world seven times a day without tiring. He is my healer."

== Love fulfilled ==
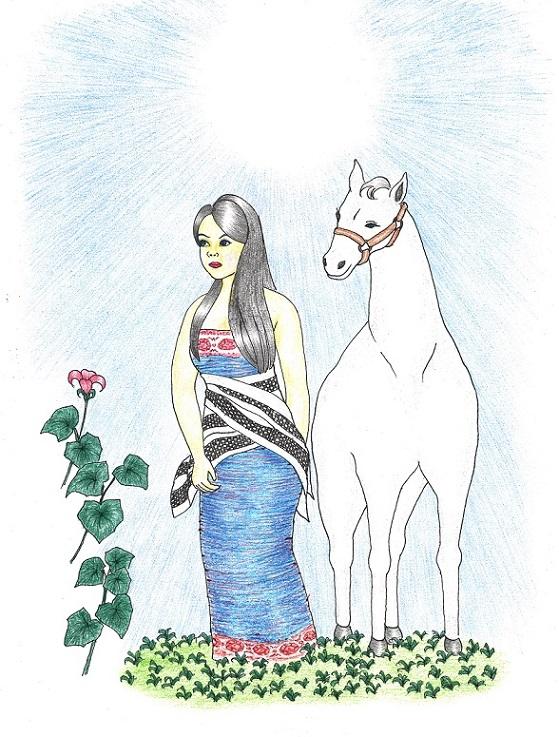
Panthoibi and her white horse, a symbol of swiftness and agility

Nongpok Ningthou arrives immediately. He sits beside Panthoibi and begins to treat her. She soon tells her mother that she feels better and praises the healer's skill. Happy and recovered, she follows Nongpok Ningthou. Their love is fulfilled, and they live happily ever after.

== Style and language ==
The language of Panthoibi Naheirol is simpler than that of Panthoibi Khongkul (Panthoibi Khonggul), but it has its own charm. The parts that describe the lovers’ meeting and the writer’s final remarks are especially touching and well-written.

== See also ==
- Panthoibi Iratpa
- Panthoibi Jagoi
- Khaba Sokchrongba
- Taram Khoinucha
- Khamba Thoibi
- Moirang Kangleirol
- Khuman Kangleirol
