= Taram Khoinucha =

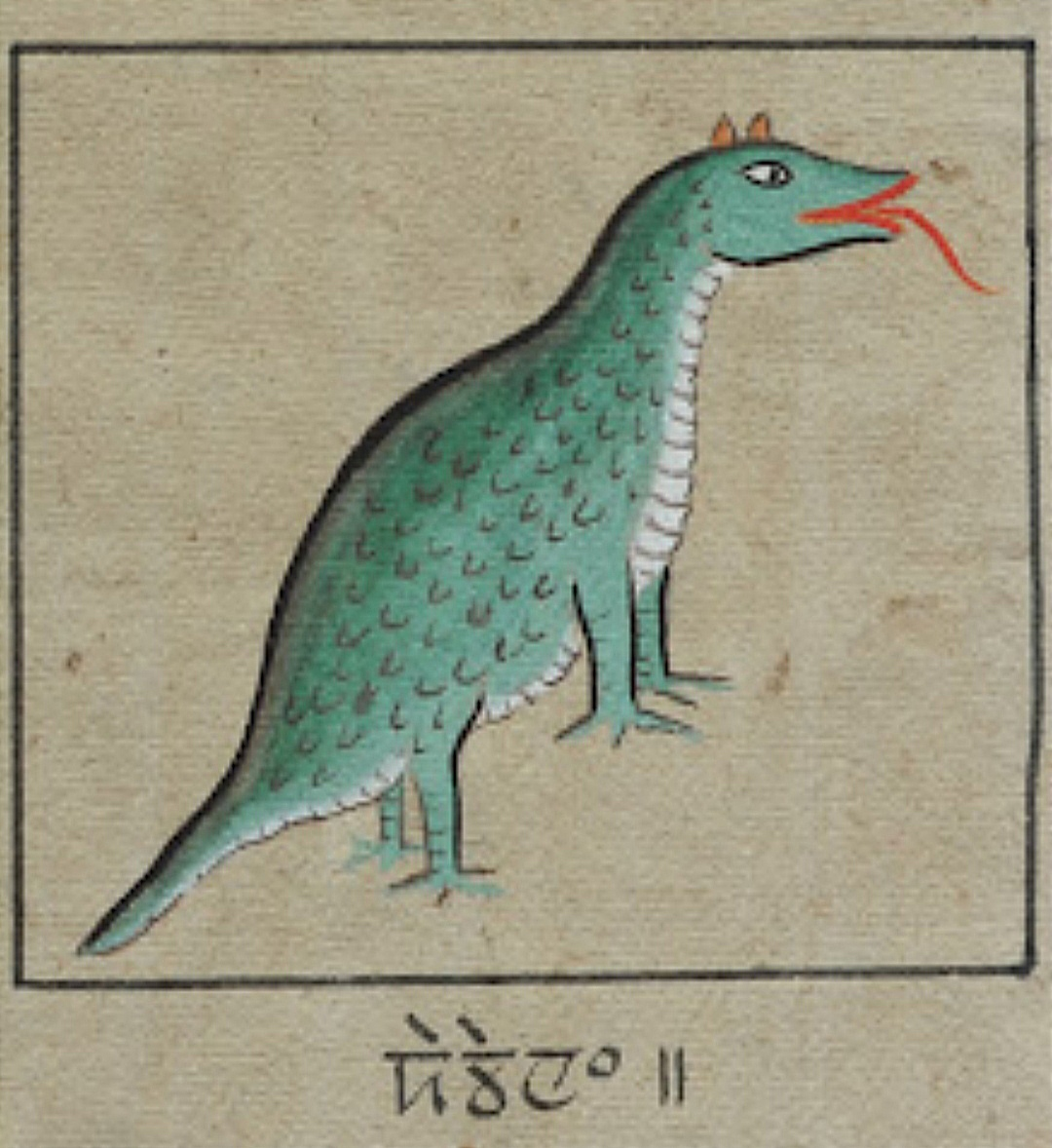
A royal totem (emblematic Meitei dragon) of the Khaba traditions, in accordance to the Pakhangba Lambuba, an ancient Meitei language manuscript text

Taram Khoinucha (ꯇꯔꯝ ꯈꯣꯏꯅꯨꯆꯥ), also known as Tarang Khoinucha (ꯇꯔꯪ ꯈꯣꯏꯅꯨꯆꯥ), was a prince of the Khaba dynasty (Kha-Nganpa group) in ancient Kangleipak (early Manipur). He was mentioned in the traditional Meitei story Panthoipi Khongkul (Panthoibi Khonggul). He was the husband of deified Lady Panthoipi, a Meitei princess known for her beauty and independence. He was deceived by his wife, who conducted a clandestine extramarital relationship with another man and ultimately left the marital household to elope with her lover, thereby bringing the marriage to an end.

== Family background ==
Taram Khoinucha was the son of Khabā Sokchrongba, the king of the Khabā dynasty, and his queen Manu Teknga.

== Marriage to Panthoipi ==
Prince Taram Khoinucha married Princess Panthoipi, daughter of a Meitei king of the Ningthouja royal family, who was known for her beauty and high standards. Many suitors had already tried to win her hand, whom she denied every time. For her marriage to Taram Khoinucha, special and luxurious preparations were made. A symbolic bridge was built using iron poles for support, silver plates as planks, and gold rods as rails. The wedding was celebrated with great honor and ceremony.

=== Marital challenges ===
After the marriage, Taram Khoinucha was disappointed as Panthoipi did not behave like a traditional wife. She spent time outdoors in the meadows and rivers. Soon, his wife met Angoupa Kainou Chingsompa (better known as Nongpok Ningthou), the chief of the Langmai Hills (present day Nongmaiching Ching). His wife fell in love with her secret lover, and although she did not run away immediately, they began to meet in secret.

As his wife continued to act against the expectations of her role, Prince Taram Khoinucha's family became suspicious. His father, Khaba Sokchrongba, pretended to be dead in order to make daughter in law, Panthoipi feel guilty and responsible. However, this plan failed.

=== Separation and aftermath ===
Using the situation as an excuse, his wife Panthoipi left his home and ran away with the man she truly loved. Taram Khoinucha's family, led by his father, tried to pursue them, but they were unsuccessful. Panthoipi and Angoupa Kainou Chingsompa (better known as Nongpok Ningthou) were eventually united and celebrated on the Langmai Hills.

== Legacy ==
Taram Khoinucha's marriage to Panthoipi is remembered for its grand beginnings and sudden failure. His role shows the traditional structure of royal marriages and the expectations placed on both men and women in society. His wife's deification later becomes a part of the early origins of the Lai Haraoba festival, where Panthoipi and her lover Nongpok Ningthou are worshipped by the Khaba-led Meitei people through holy and sacred ritualistic music and dance.

== Related pages ==
- Cuckold
- Panthoibi Naheron
- Meitei marriage
- Women in Meitei civilisation
- List of Meitei princesses
- Nongmaiching Ching
- Khuman dynasty
- Moirang dynasty
- Luwang dynasty
- Chenglei dynasty
