= Khaba Sokchrongba =

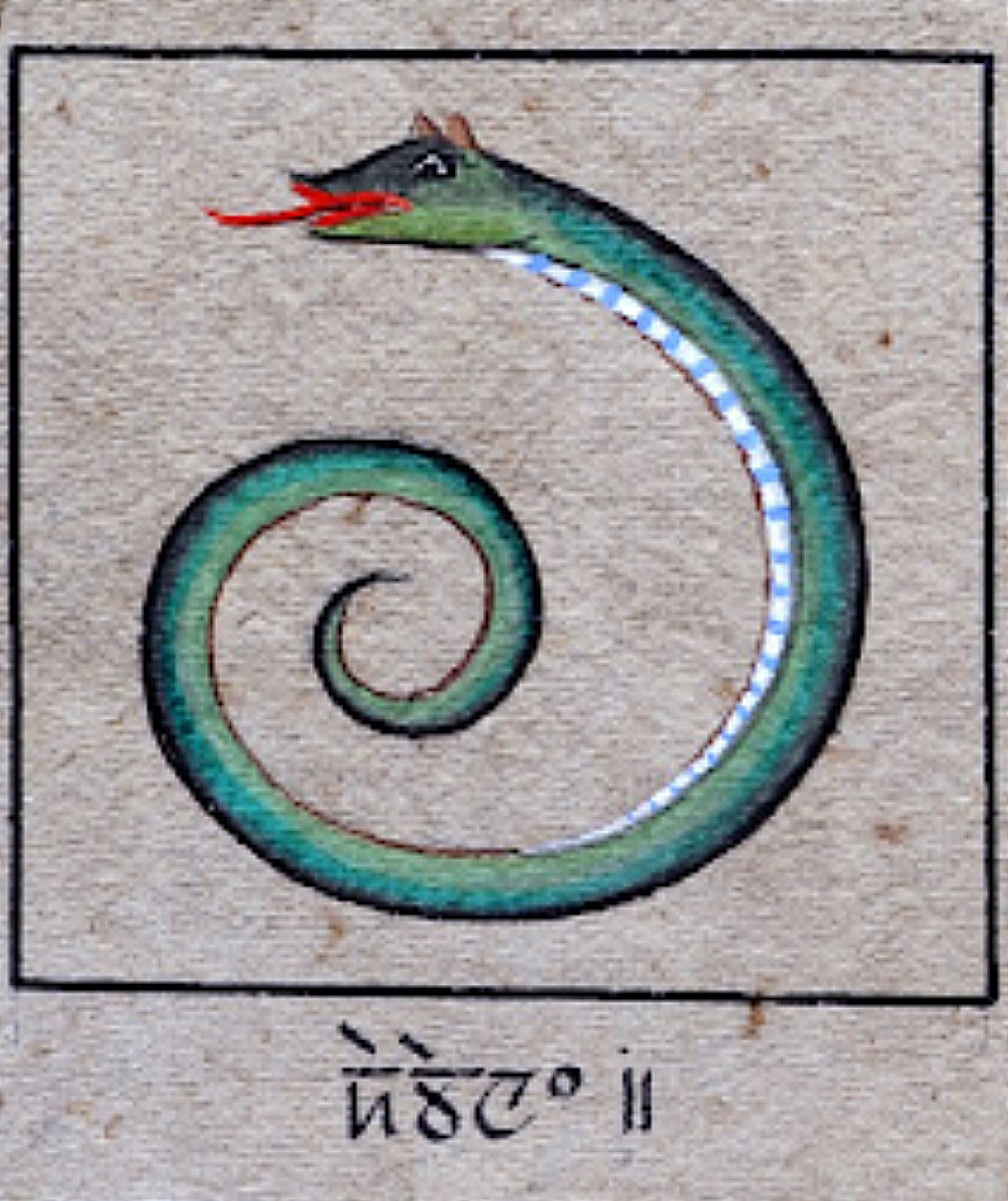
A royal totem of the Khaba traditions, in accordance to the Pakhangba Lambuba, an ancient Meitei language manuscript text

Khaba Sokchrongba (ꯈꯥꯕ ꯁꯣꯛꯆꯔꯣꯡꯕ), also known as Khaba Shokchrongba, was a king from the Khaba dynasty (Kha-Nganpa group) in ancient Kangleipak (early Manipur). He is best known in traditional Meitei stories as the father-in-law of deified Lady Panthoipi, a Meitei princess of the Ningthouja royal family. He played an important role in the story Panthoipi Khongkul (Panthoibi Khonggul).

== Family ==
Khaba Sokchrongba was married to Queen Manu Teknga. Their son was Taram Khoinucha (also known as Tarang Khoinucha), who later married Panthoipi (or Panthoibi), a Ningthouja princess known for her beauty and strong will.

== Role in Panthoipi's marriage ==
When Ningthouja Princess Panthoipi was married to Khaba Prince Taram Khoinucha, grand preparations were made to welcome her. A special bridge was built using iron poles, silver plates, and gold rods. The marriage took place with great ceremony, and Panthoipi was brought to her husband's home. Khaba Sokchrongba, as head of the royal family, and the father in law, was involved in these arrangements.

== Reaction to Panthoipi's behavior ==
After the marriage, Panthoipi did not act like a traditional married woman. She spent her time outdoors, in the meadows and rivers, and soon fell in love with another man, Angoupa Kainou Chingsompa (better known as Nongpok Ningthou). She began meeting him in secret.

Khaba Sokchrongba, as her father in law, and his family members noticed her unusual behavior. To bring her back to family duties, he devised many plans meant to make her feel sad and guilty, and to remind her of her responsibilities. However, the plans failed.

=== Attempt to stop her escape ===
Daughter in law Panthoipi used the situation as an excuse to leave her husband's home. She ran away with the man she loved. Khaba Sokchrongba led a group from the Khaba family to chase after his daughter in law. But they were not able to stop her, and the lovers escaped successfully.

== Legacy ==
Khaba Sokchrongba's actions in the story show the traditional views on marriage, duty, and honor in Meitei society. His failure to stop his daughter in law, Panthoipi's escape shows the strength of her independent spirit. The story ends with the lovers being celebrated by divine beings, and later being worshipped by the Khaba royal family themselves through music and dance, which later became the basis for the Lai Haraoba festival.

== See also ==
- Panthoibi Naheron
- Meitei marriage
- Women in Meitei civilisation
- List of Meitei princesses
- Nongmaiching Ching
- Khuman dynasty
- Moirang dynasty
- Luwang dynasty
- Chenglei dynasty
