= Panthoibi (disambiguation) =

Panthoibi is the goddess of civilization, courage, fertility, handicraft, love, victory, warfare and wisdom in Sanamahism.

Panthoibi may also refer to:

- Panthoibi Iratpa, a traditional Meitei religious festival dedicated to goddess Panthoibi
- Panthoibi Jagoi, a traditional Meitei dance form dedicated to goddess Panthoibi
- Panthoibi Khongul, an ancient Meitei language religious text dedicated to goddess Panthoibi
- Panthoibi Naheron, another ancient Meitei language religious text dedicated to goddess Panthoibi
