= Shangnu =

Ancient Meitei goddess

- Consort of the water deity Queen of the underwater world
- Member of Meitei deities
- Holy and sacred symbol of traditional Meitei religion
- Other names: Shangnu Shanghra, Shangkhurembi or Shangno
- Meitei: ꯁꯪꯅꯨ
- Affiliation: Sanamahism (Meitei mythology)
- Major cult centre: Anal Khullen and Sugnu
- Abode: underwater environment
- Artifacts: holy and sacred stones
- Symbol: Nungsham algae
- Adherents: Sanamahists
- Enemy: Thumkhel
- Gender: female
- Region: Kangleipak
- Ethnic group: Meitei & Anal
- Temples: Sugnu
- Festivals: Lai Haraoba
- Associated deities: Wangpulen

Genealogy
- Born: Anal Khullen
- Parents: Mongyam Ngamba
- Consort: Wangpulen (Note: different sources give different spellings like Wangbrel, Wangbren, Wangbarel, Wangbaren, Wangpulel, Wangpulen, Wangpurel, Wangpuren, etc.)
- Children: Khana Chaoba Lok Ningthou (Note: The divine epithet "Khana Chaoba" is shared as a common title by father, Wangpulen/Wangbren and son, Lok Ningthou.)

Equivalents
- Greek: Amphitrite
- Roman: Salacia

Shangnu, also known as Shangnu Shanghra (or Shangkhurembi or Shangno), is a goddess in the mythology and folklore of the Meitei and Anal cultures of ancient Kangleipak (early Manipur). She is remembered as the mortal woman who became the wife of Wangpulen (Wangbrel), the supreme deity of water, who came to the human world in mortal form. According to tradition, she was the only daughter of Anal Chief Mongyam Ngamba of Anal Khullen village. Known for her exceptional beauty, grace, and gentle character, she gained Wangbren's attention and affection during his visit to the human world. Their union forms one of the central episodes in Meitei and Anal mythology, linking the human world with the divine realm. Some traditions believe that she is the mother of Khana Chaoba (Lok Ningthou).

== Local beliefs ==
Totally opposite of the general beliefs, certain groups of Anal Khullen village think that Shangnu is not a daughter of the chief's family, but of a widow. Again, unlike the general story of Shangnu being the only daughter of her parents, some believe that she might be the eighth among many siblings.

== Background ==
Shangnu (ꯁꯪꯅꯨ/ꯁꯡꯅꯨ) was born into the Anal chief's household in Anal Khullen village. She grew up during a time when villages frequently fought one another, and survival depended upon the strength of great warriors. She was admired for her beauty, modesty, and kindness, qualities that would later attract the attention of Wangbren (ꯋꯥꯡꯄꯨꯂꯦꯟ/ꯋꯥꯡꯕꯔꯦꯟ) himself.

== Love affair ==
According to the legend, Wangpulen (Wangbrel), the supreme god of water, once assumed the form of a handsome young man and entered the Anal village to observe humanity. During his stay he met Shangnu, and the two soon fell in love. Being an incarnation of divine destiny, Shangnu was naturally drawn to Wangbrel's noble appearance and gentle character.

The villagers, however, strongly opposed their relationship. Since Wangbrel appeared to be an unknown stranger from another community, they regarded the marriage as dishonourable and challenged him to prove his worth.

=== Contest to win Shangnu ===
To win Shangnu hand in marriage, Wangbren was to accept certain challenges from the Anal community. The villagers believed that no man alive could equal their village's mightiest warrior, named Thumkhel (ꯊꯨꯝꯈꯦꯜ), whose extraordinary strength had made the Anal village the most feared among neighbouring communities. Confident of victory, they demanded that Wangbrel compete against him in three contests, running, stone throwing, and archery. Shangnu watched as the contests unfolded.

In the race, Wangbrel consistently stayed ahead of Thumkhel, increasing his speed whenever the warrior approached. The defeat astonished the spectators, for Thumkhel had never before lost a contest of strength or endurance. The second contest involved throwing massive stones. Although both competitors threw their stones equally far, Wangbrel's stone was twice as large as Thumkhel's, demonstrating greater power. In the final contest of archery, Wangbrel again emerged victorious with flawless accuracy. The villagers realised that no ordinary human being could defeat Thumkhel in every contest.

== Marriage ==
Shangnu united with her lover, Wangbrel as he had won all the competition rounds. Finally, she departed with him. Suspicious of the true identity of Wangbren, the villagers secretly tied a long thread to Shangnu's clothing so they could trace the couple's destination. The thread led them to a great opening in the earth. There Wangbrel revealed his true form as the supreme deity. The villagers understood that only a god possessed the power to surpass their greatest warrior, Thumkhel.

== Worship ==
In shrines dedicated to Wangbren, the water deity, two symbolic stones are traditionally erected, the larger stone represents Wangbren, while the smaller stone represents Shangnu, showing her association with water-related spiritual traditions.

== Legacy ==
Shangnu is associated with the sacred edible freshwater algae, known as Nungsham, literally meaning "stone hair" (botanically identified as Lemanea fluviatilis), which is found in the Chakpi River around Sugnu, in Manipur. The Nungsham algae is believed by the tradition to represent the hair of the goddess Shangnu. It is regarded as a divine gift bestowed by Shangnu upon the Anal and Meetei communities and holds cultural and spiritual significance in their traditional belief systems.

== See also ==
- Panthoibi and Nongpok Ningthou
- Nungthel Leima and Loyalakpa
- Kounu and Koupalu (Koubru)
- Koiren Leima and Thangching (Thangjing)
- Meitei martial arts
- Meitei traditional weapons
- Meitei traditional games
- Meitei marriage
