= Lok Ningthou =

Meitei God of streams and gorges

- God of streams, Guardian of the Southern direction
- Member of Lainingthous and Maikei Ngaakpa Lais
- Affiliation: Sanamahism
- Gender: Male
- Region: Ancient Kangleipak (Antique Manipur)
- Ethnic group: Meitei ethnicity
- Festivals: Lai Haraoba

Genealogy
- Parents: Wangpulen (Wangbren) (father)

Lok Ningthou (Meitei: ꯂꯣꯛ ꯅꯤꯪꯊꯧ), also known as Khana Chaoba, is the God associated with streams and gorges in Meitei mythology and religion of Ancient Kangleipak. He is the Guardian God of the Southern direction. He is a son of Wangpulen, the God of water. Some traditions believe that his mother is Shangnu, a woman from the Anal community.

== Description ==
God Lok Ningthou is also given the title Khana Chaoba like his father Wangpulen. He is also known as Noushuba Mihingchi (Old Manipuri: Noushupa Mihingchi). He is known for having seven children.

Lok Ningthou is one of the Lainingthous. He is also one of the ten Maikei Ngaakpa Lais.

== See also ==
- Irai Leima
- Ngaleima
