= Kajenglei =

Traditional Dress of Manipur

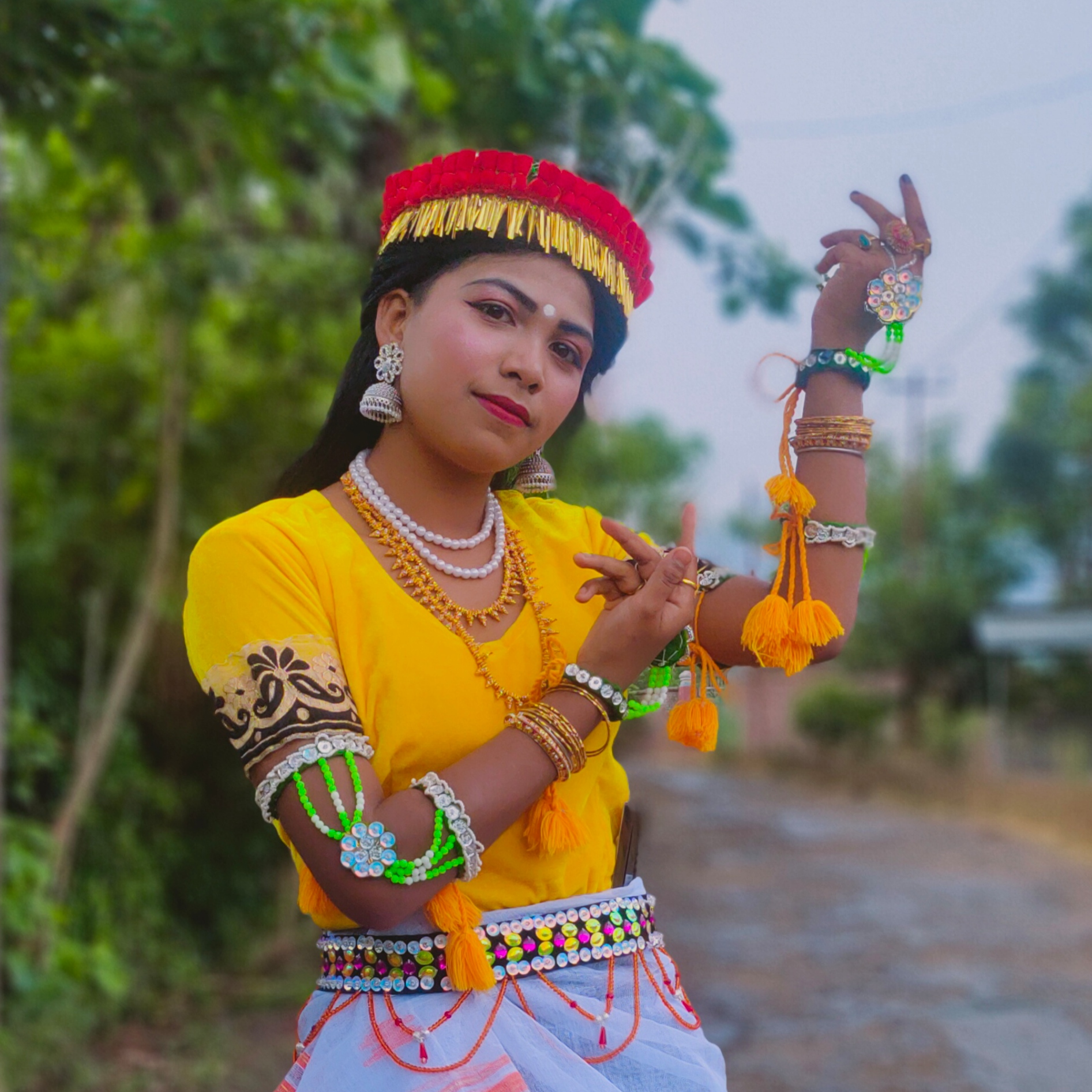
A girl wearing the Kajenglei ornamental head-dress

Kajenglei (Ancient Meitei: Kachenglei), also known as Leitreng, is a Meitei cultural ladies' headdress, consisting of eighty to hundred brass strips, worn especially by Meitei goddesses, Meitei female royalties, female dancers of traditional Meitei dance forms and brides of traditional Meitei wedding. It is made from the plant Khekwai which grows abundantly in hilly and mountainous areas of Manipur. It is presently available in most of the markets including Khwairamband Bazar in Manipur.
