= Meitei marriage =

Marriage in Meitei civilization

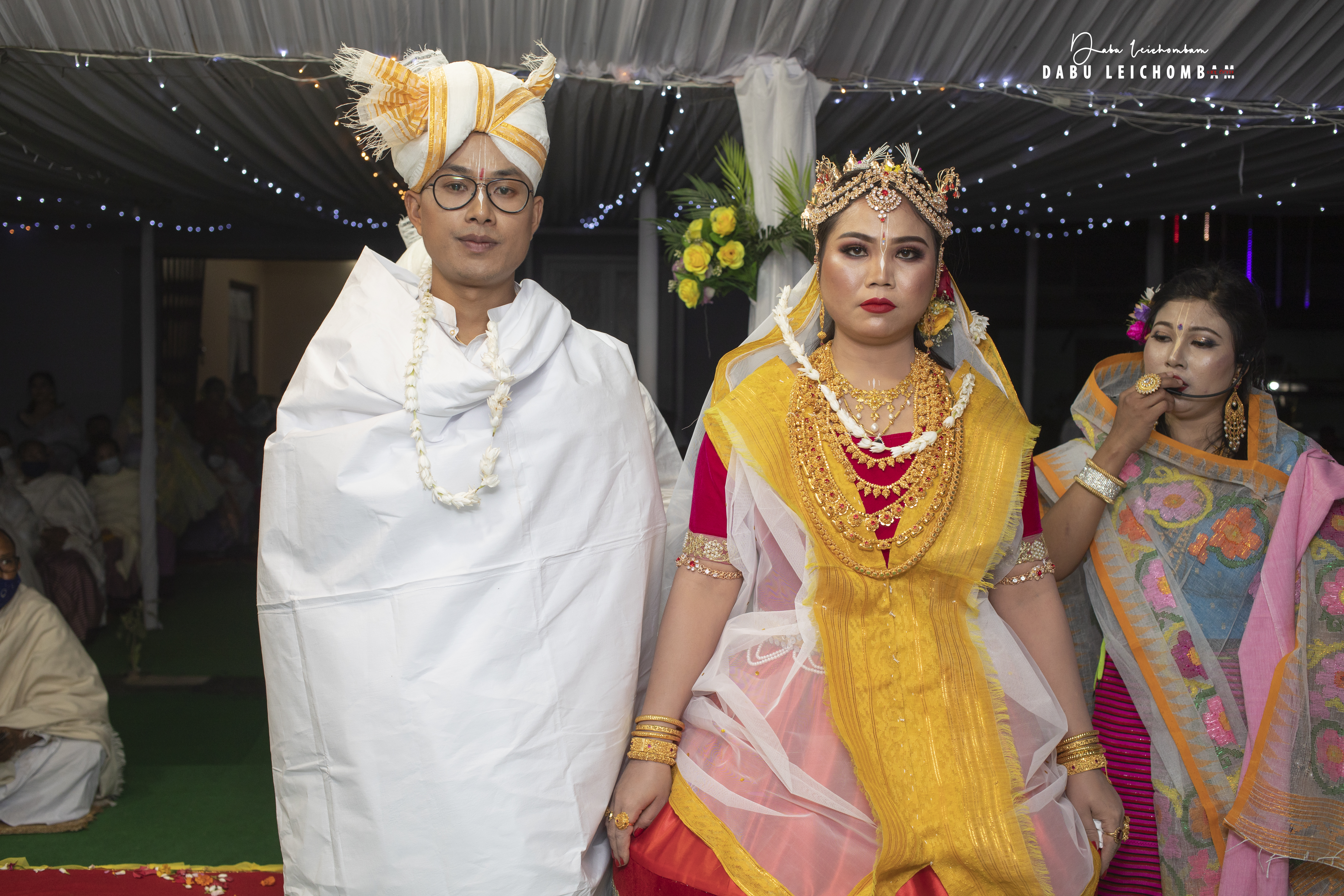
A groom and a bride in Meitei tradition

In Meitei culture, marriage is a sacred and special union between a man and a woman, done with religious ceremonies. The word for marriage in Meitei language is Luhongba (Meitei: ꯂꯨꯍꯣꯡꯕ), which means the joining of the man and woman's hearts and souls, not just their bodies. Meitei people (also known as Manipuris) believe that women are called Oi-gi-lamdang (left way) and men are called Yet-ki-lamdang (right way). This shows that marriage is a lifelong partnership, both physically and spiritually. It is a Meitei intangible cultural heritage.

== Exogamy and endogamy ==
In the past, marriage within one's own clan (endogamy) was common. For example, Khaba Shokchrongba, the father-in-law of Panthoibi, married a woman from his own clan. For Modern Meitei, endogamy is no longer permissible and exogamy is the norm. Exogamy has helped strengthen relationships between clans.

Polygamy, or having more than one wife, was also once common. After a battle, the winner would often take the wife of the defeated enemy. Weaker rulers sometimes gave their daughters to powerful kings. As a result, kings had many wives, and this practice spread to noble families and later to common people.

== Courtship ==
In a traditional courtship (koiba), a young man, with one or two friends, would visit a girl’s house just after sunset. When they sat down, if the girl liked him, she would give him a long tobacco pipe made from banana leaves. If she didn’t like him, she would give him a short one. Koiba could lead to an engagement or, if family discussions didn’t work out, an elopement. This style of courtship has been replaced by modern methods.

== Arranged marriage ==
This is the most respected and common type of marriage in Meitei culture.

=== Preliminary steps ===
Generally, there are four steps to be followed before a marriage takes place.

1. Hainaba or Haina Singnaba (go between) a young man's family approaches the family of a potential bride. His mother and two other women from his family take gifts of fruit and other food the young woman's house. If her family don’t approve, the process stops.
2. Yathang Thanaba (initial agreement) The boy’s father and other older male family members go to the potential bride's house. They show their agreement by bowing to each other.
3. Wairoipot Puba (confirming the decision) the prospective groom’s family and close friends visit the prospective bride’s house, bringing sweets, betel nuts, fruits, and other gifts to confirm the marriage.
4. Heijing Kharai Puba (announcement of the marriage) the groom’s family brings gifts, such as fruits, sweets, items for the gods, and clothes for the bride to her home. Two particular fruits, (heikru) and (heining), must be included. Offerings are made to the family gods, including the ancestors and Sanamahi. The gifts of food are shared and eaten. Unlike other steps, Heijing Kharai Puba has a special social and religious meaning; after this ceremony, the couple are understood to be married, even before the formal wedding ceremony, and that the bride has joined groom’s family.

The dowry is not fixed and depends on the family’s status.

=== Wedding ceremony ===
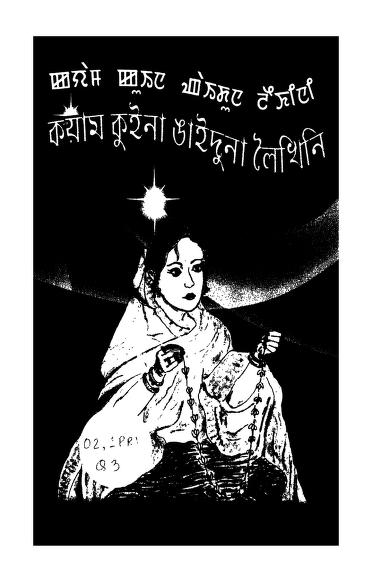
A traditional Meitei bride holding a garland

After all the preparations, the wedding date is set for a lucky day. The day before the wedding, the groom is invited by a younger brother or another male relative of the bride. He is given a garland and offered betel nut and leaf.

The bride walks around the groom seven times, throwing flowers over his head each time. On the seventh round, she places two flower garlands around his neck. The groom then takes one garland and puts it around the bride’s neck.

The main part of the ceremony is to make the marriage official with a ritual, either by lighting a fire or setting up a water pot. Kujaba Punba (tying the bride’s hand to the groom’s hand) is an important step before walking around the groom. During this, Omen is also done, which includes Chiruk Nungshang (a basket with rice, salt, coins, ginger, tobacco, and cotton) and Ngamu Thaba (releasing fish into the water).

The ceremony ends with both families exchanging betel nuts and bowing to each other. When the bride arrives at the groom’s house, she is greeted by her mother-in-law and another woman from the family. They lead her into the house, covering her back with their own shawls. This tradition has been followed by the Meitei people for a long time, as shown in old texts like Panthoibi Khongul.

On the fifth day of the marriage, the bride and groom visit the bride's parents, and in the morning and evening, a divination of the couple's future is performed by opening a basket of rice received by the bride during the engagement process. Phiruk Kaiba or Chiruk Nungshak Kaiba

The wedding concludes with a feast called Mapam Chakouba on the sixth day.

== Elopement ==
In the past, if a girl agreed to run away with a man, he would visit her house when her family was asleep, and she would sneak out to join him.

Afterward, if the bride's parents accepted the marriage, they would hold a keinya katpa ceremony in which the bride and groom exchange garlands, and a priest says some prayers, and the groom's family offers gifts to the Meitei deities Sanamahi, Leimarel Sidabi, Lam Lai, and other ancestors.

Sometimes, a couple becomes husband and wife without ceremony. If the girl’s parents want to officially recognize the marriage, they do so with a simple loukhatpa ceremony. Otherwise, the bride may be cut off from her parents and forbidden to enter their house, and some strict in-laws may not accept food made by her.

== Dresses ==
The bride's dress depends on her family's faith. If the bride is from a Hindu Meitei family, she wears a Potloi (a round embroidered skirt). If she is from a non-Hindu (traditional Meitei religion/Sanamahism practising) family, she wears a Phanek Mayek Naiba (a striped garment). The groom wears the same clothes: a white Pheijom (Meitei traditional loincloth/dhoti), kurta, and Kokyet (Meitei traditional headdress/turban).

== Gallery ==
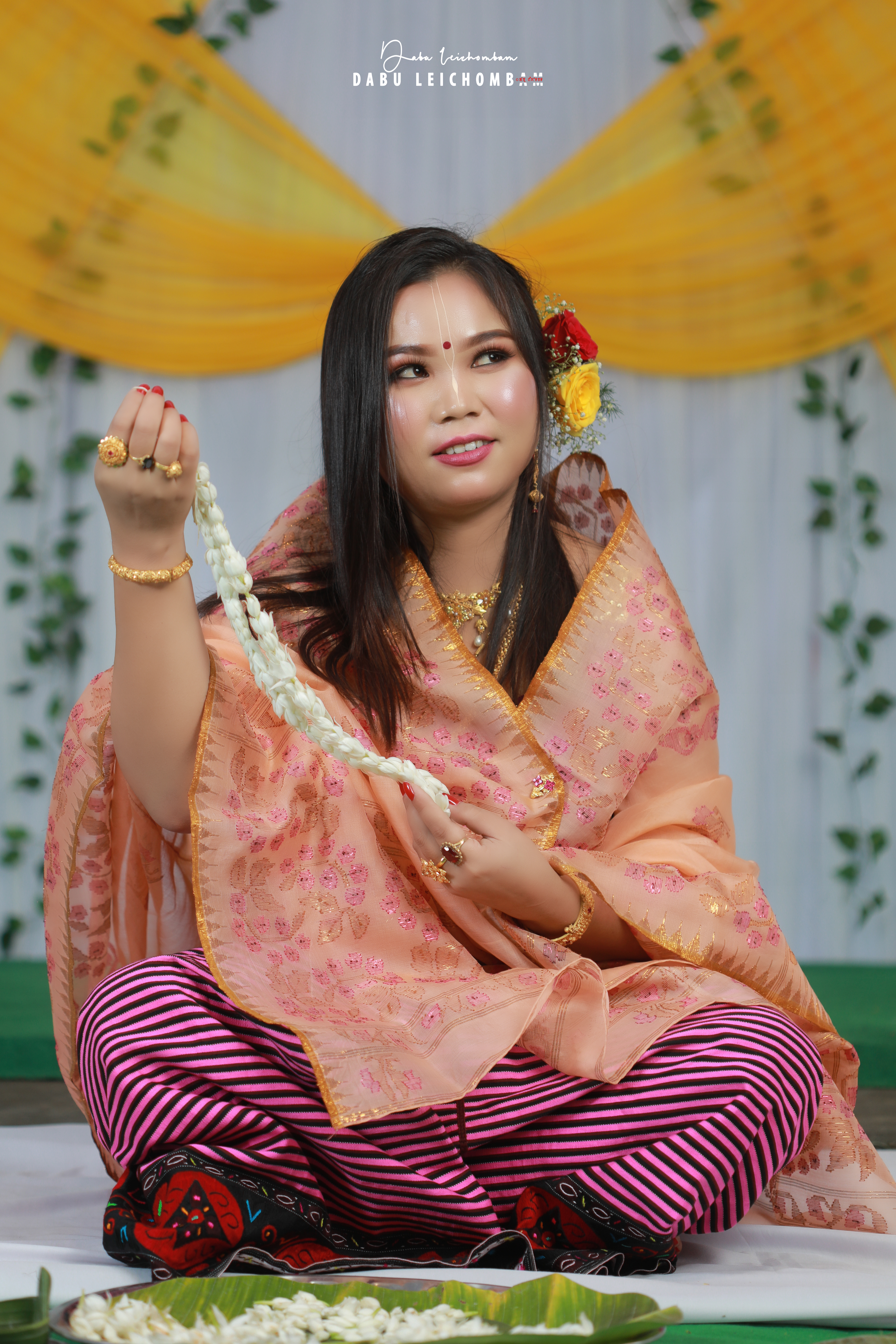

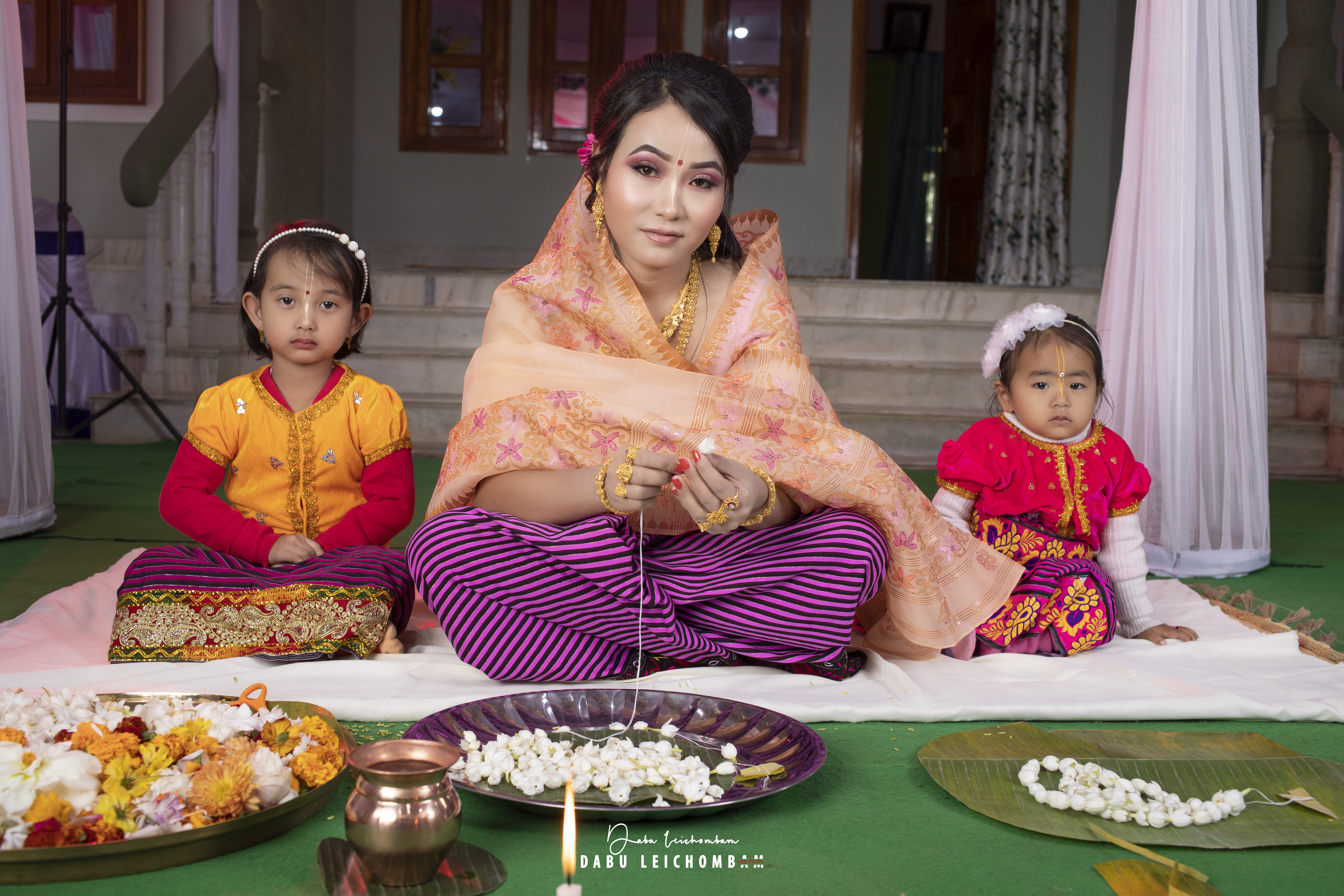

== See also ==
- Epic cycles of incarnations in Moirang
- Women in Meitei civilization
- Plants in Meitei culture
- Meitei festivals
- Meitei martial arts
- Meitei traditional weapons
- Meitei traditional toys
