= Pānthoibī Khōnggūl =

Meitei language text

Panthoibi Khonggul (Meitei: pān-thoi-bī khōng-gūl)
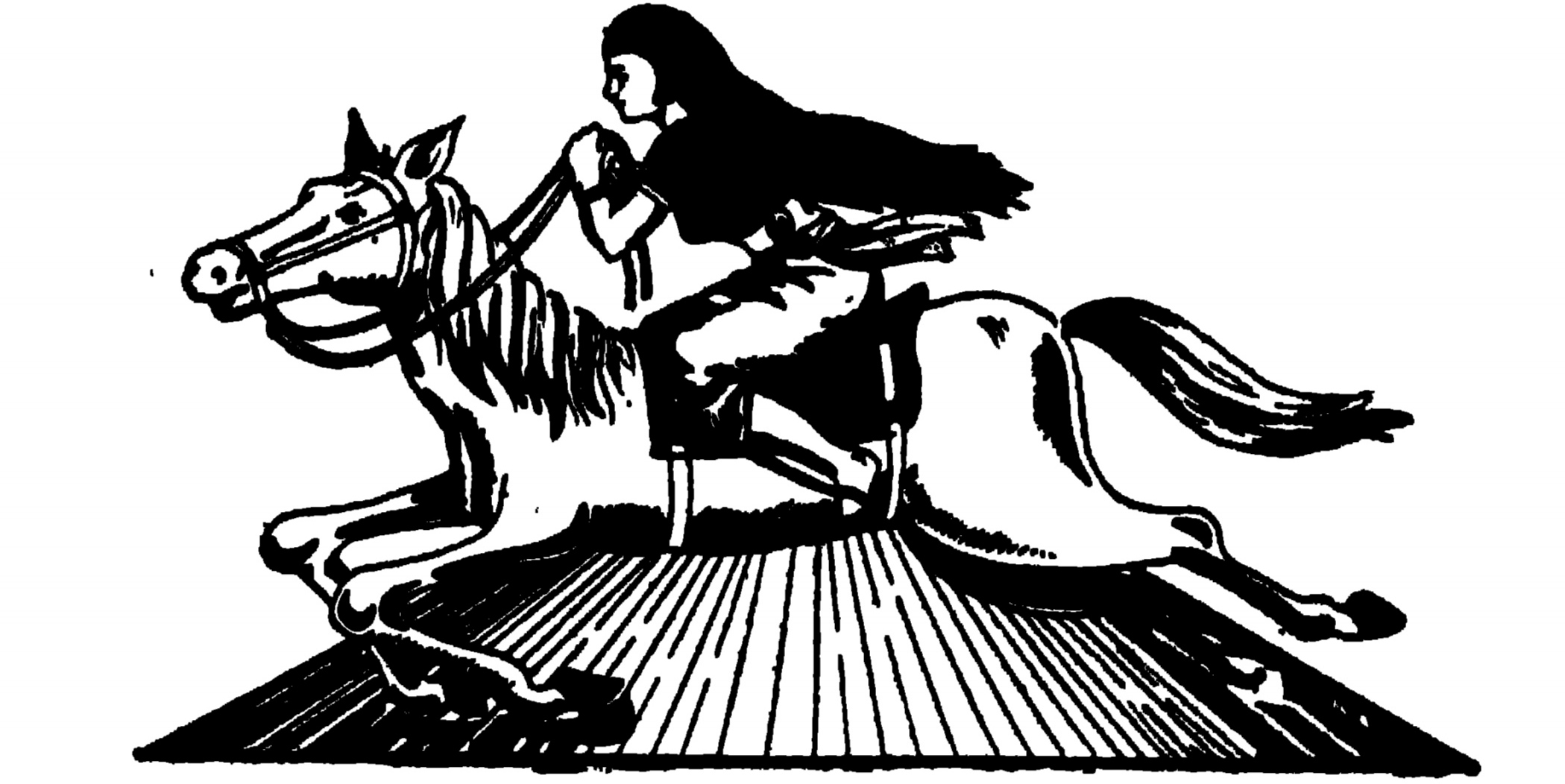
- Deified Meitei princess Panthoipi charging forward riding on her white horse as described in the "Panthoibi Khonggul" text

Information
- Religion: Traditional Meitei religion (Sanamahism)
- Author: Akoijam Tombi (also called Akoijam Tomboy)
- Language: Ancient Meitei: Panthoipi Khongkul, romanized: /pān-thoi-pī khōng-kūl/
- Period: 8th century AD

The Panthoibi Khonggul (Ancient Meitei: Panthoipi Khongkul, romanized: /pān-thoi-pī khōng-kūl/; Meitei: ꯄꯥꯟꯊꯣꯢꯕꯤ ꯈꯣꯡꯒꯨꯜ, romanized: pān-thoi-bī khōng-gūl, lit. 'in quest of Panthoibi or "Panthoibi's footprint"'), often misspelled as Panthoibi Khongul, is an ancient Meitei language text, narrating about the quest of deified Meitei princess Panthoibi. The text highlights the love story of Panthoibi and her ultimate lover Nongpok Ningthou, after leaving her former husband's house. It is traditionally attributed to be written by Akoijam Tombi (also called Akoijam Tomboy), during the reign of Meitei King Khongtekcha Yoiremba in c. 763 AD.

The text also talks about how the festival Lai Haraoba was begun after the union of the two lovers.

== Introduction ==
The author of the text first introduces Panthoipi as a noble lady of surpassing beauty, a princess born to a Meitei king. In the beginning, she was spending her lonely days in the ningol kaa (Meitei for 'unmarried daughter's chamber'). Many suitors sought her hand in marriage. King Sapaiba was the first suitor of Panthoibi. He had many great promises of making outstanding roadways, beautiful bridges, a grand palace, a big fish pond, everything just for the sake of her. However, princess Panthoibi rejected his offer claiming that all his preparations were not worthy enough to her level.

== Accounts for the first marriage ==
Meitei princess Panthoibi was married to crown prince Taram Khoinucha, son of King Khaba Sokchrongba and Queen Manu Teknga of the Khaba dynasty. At this grand marriage ceremony, outstandingly elaborate arrangements were made to receive the Meitei princess. The bridge was constructed with iron poles as its supports, silver plates were used as the planks and gold rods were used as the side rails. Despite the marriage was a grandeur, Panthoipi turned out to be contrasting. She didn't want to live in the way of life of a normal married women. Instead of it, she would always stay outdoors. She kept herself busy in wandering around the open meadows and bathing and sporting in the cool waters of the running river.

== Accounts for the extramarital affairs ==
During one of Panthoibi's escapades, she met Angoupa Kainou Chingsompa (Nongpok Ningthou), the ruler of the Langmai Hills (Nongmaiching Ching). The two fell in love with each other at the first sight. Nongpok Ningthou's handsome look and towering personality were the reasons why Panthoibi was attracted to him. Panthoibi and her paramour had several occasions to meet with each other secretly. Her activities cause her in laws suspicious of her behaviour. Her in laws tried at their best level to make Panthoibi change her behaviour. However, Panthoibi didn't give up.

== Accounts for the second marriage (elopement) and deification ==
=== Elopement ===
Panthoibi slipped out of her former husband's house (house of the Khaba dynasty) and eloped with the man after her own heart. Her in laws also didn't give up, like she didn't give up their persuasion to change her behaviour. The Khabas, under the leadership of her father in law, pursued her. The two met many difficulties in the way to escape from the Khabas. Finally, the two successfully managed to get the Khabas in vain.

=== Deification ===
The two lovers got united in the Nongmaiching Ching (Selloi Langmai Ching), with a celebration that gave rise to the festival of Lai Haraoba. It is said that the celebration was attended by many ancient Meitei gods and goddesses. Later on, Meitei princess Panthoibi and her new husband Nongpok Ningthou (ruler of Nongmaiching mountains) were deified by the Khabas. The Khabas started worshipping them by performing dance and music. It was said to be the seminal form of the Lai Haraoba performances.

== Praises to Panthoibi ==
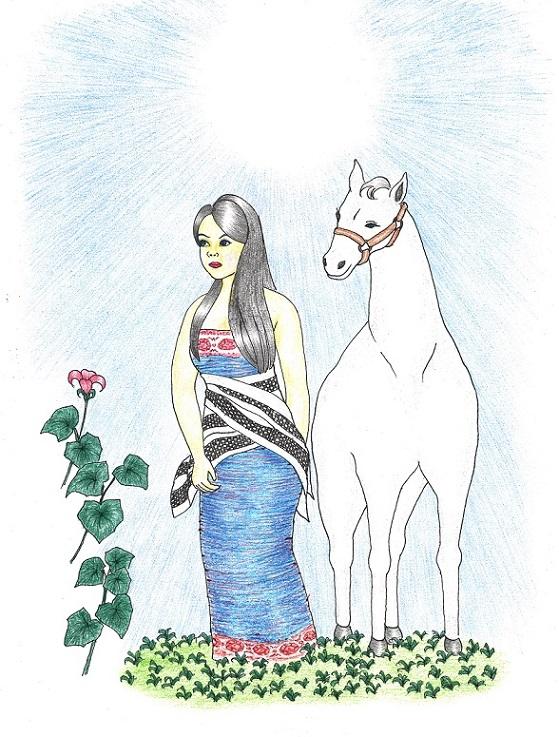
Panthoibi and her white horse, a symbol of swiftness and agility

Different aspects of the personalities of Goddess Panthoibi are described in the text. The following is a few of them:

O Tampha, your measure reaches the sky; an ever-shining radiance marks your presence; you are the source of all living beings... both birth and death are your handiwork, you are the repository of all wealth; you can unravel the mystery of human souls and keep both the earth and the heaven jointly linked; you give shelter to the souls of living beings, keep them as beads are strung together; you are the highest of all goddesses and the most munificent in bestowing blessings...both the striped tiger and the white horse are your chargers; you can gallop on tall grass tops without even leaving a trace... you are born of the noblest royal family, are unmindful of your brothers and parents, as disposed to doing only what pleases you... you are the very embodiment of beauty but still indulge in constant baths at every fount and embellish your tender body, use all the fruits of the Langmai Hills as unguents, always neatly comb your tresses of hair, skitter lightly with your drapery loosely hung on your full blossomed body; your teeth are like pearls, your lips are as red as the wild fruit tayal in the bamboo grove; your fingers are soft as those of a neonate; your name is Panthoipi as no parents or brothers can exercise control over you; you appropriated the name by yourself ere anyone confers it on you; you have an unfettered soul, nowhere can you keep yourself confined, you have as many appearances as you please to change your abode... you lord over the vast empty vault, took your birth with the flash of lightning... you are the receptacle of all knowledge... no opponent can confront you in the stricken field, you shine more than the glories of all divine beings put together... you emerged with the flash of summer lightning before dew-drops got condensed in the sky, before sound itself could be audible and before the azure welkin could yet cover its vast expanse... you are effulgent in the open sky like one thousand suns... all the divine beings emanate from you... the wide universe is your creation... you take fancy more to lively frolics than engaging your intelligence... you pervade all the directions....

== Editions ==
- In 1963, the scripture "Panthoibi Khongkul" was published by M. Chandra Singh.
- In 1968, the scripture was again published by N. Ibobi Singh.

== Bibliography ==
- Ariba Manipuri Sahityagee Saklon
