= Panthoibi Iratpa =

Religious Festival of Goddess Panthoibi

Statue of goddess Panthoibi in Khangabok, Manipur

Panthoibi Iratpa or Panthoibi Iraat Thouni or Panthoibi Eratpa is a religious festival of the Meitei people dedicated to Panthoibi, the ancient Meitei goddess of civilization, courage, fertility, handicraft, love, victory, warfare and wisdom of Sanamahism (traditional Meitei religion). It is celebrated on the first day of the Meitei lunar month of Mera, based on the traditional Meitei calendar. It usually, though not always, coincides with the day of the Hindu festival of Durga Puja, which is based on the Hindu calendar. So, both the festival are often celebrated together in Manipur, despite their religious differences. Goddess Panthoibi is syncretised with Hindu goddess Durga since 1714 AD during the reign of emperor Pamheiba (Garib Niwaj) when he made Hinduism as the official religion (state religion) of the Kingdom of Manipur.

The Hiyangthang Lairembi Temple (originally dedicated to goddess Hiyangthang Lairembi a.k.a. Irai Leima) in Imphal West district is the largest site for celebration of the Panthoibi Iratpa festival in Manipur.
