= Nongpok Ningthou =

Ancient Meitei God

- The Eastern Direction
- Member of Maikei Ngaakpa Lais and Umang Lais
- Other names: Kainou Chingsompa Angoupa Apanpa
- Major cult center: Nongmaiching Mountains
- Abode: Nongmaiching Mountains
- Weapon: spear
- Texts: Langkol Chingkoipa, Nongmaiching Chingkoipa, Panthoibi Khongul, Panthoibi Naheirol
- Gender: Male
- Region: Ancient Kangleipak (early Manipur)
- Ethnic group: Meitei ethnicity
- Festivals: Lai Haraoba
- Consort: Panthoibi

Equivalents
- Hindu: Shiva
- Chinese: King Father of the East

Nongpok Ningthou (Meitei: ꯅꯣꯡꯄꯣꯛ ꯅꯤꯡꯊꯧ), also known as the Sovereign of the East or King of the East, is a deity in Sanamahism, the indigenous religion of Manipur. He is the ruling guardian deity of the eastern direction. Legend says Nongpok Ningthou and his consort Panthoibi were united in the Nongmaiching Ching mountains. Later, they were worshipped as the civilization giving deities in Meitei religion.

Nongpok Ningthou is one of the principal Umang Lais. He was originally known as Langmai Ningthou (Lord of the Langmai people).

== History ==
The Nongmaiching Hill (also known as Selloi Langmai Hills) was the ancestral territory of the Selloi Langmai people. This zone has the strongest worship of God Langmai Ningthou (Nongpok Ningthou). According to the Nongmaiching Chingkoipa (AKA Nongmaijing Chingoiba) text, the mountain in the east and beyond the rivers (Imphal R., Iril R. and Kongba R.) is the abode of God Keinou Chingsompa (another name of Nongpok Ningthou).

According to the Thalon (Tharon) text, Selloi Langmai Hill had 5 divisions. Each division was occupied by different ethnic groups. Each groups had different ancestral deities. These were later described as the 5 pillars of the Selloi Langmai country.

| Territories | Latin transliteration (Romanization) | Deities | Latin transliteration (Romanization) |
|---|---|---|---|
| ꯑꯟꯗ꯭ꯔꯣ | Andro | ꯑꯟꯗ꯭ꯔꯣ ꯀꯣꯟꯕ, ꯄꯅꯝ ꯅꯤꯡꯊꯧ | Andro Konba, Panam Ningthou (lit.Chief of Panam) |
| ꯀꯩꯅꯧ | Keinou | ꯇꯥꯔꯤꯌꯥ, ꯀꯩꯅꯧ ꯂꯥꯛꯄ | Tariya, the Keinou Lakpa (lit. Chief of Keinou) |
| ꯋꯥꯈꯥ | Wakha | ꯄꯨꯂꯩꯂꯣꯝꯄ (ꯄꯨꯔꯩꯔꯣꯝꯕ), ꯋꯥꯈꯥ ꯂꯥꯛꯄ | Puleilompa (Pureiromba), the Wakha Lakpa (lit. Chief of Wakha) |
| ꯆꯤꯡꯌꯥꯢ | Chingyai | ꯆꯤꯡꯁꯣꯝꯄ (ꯆꯤꯡꯁꯣꯝꯕ), ꯆꯤꯡꯌꯥꯢ ꯂꯥꯛꯄ | Chingsomba, the Chingyai Lakpa (lit. Chief of Chingyai) |
| ꯆꯤꯡꯁꯥꯡ | Chingshang | ꯄꯥꯜꯂꯨꯡ ꯅꯤꯡꯊꯧ, ꯆꯤꯡꯁꯥꯡ ꯂꯥꯛꯄ | Pallung Ningthou, the Chingshang Lakpa (lit. Chief of Chingshang) |

Later, in the course of time, these 5 gods belonging to 5 different places of the Selloi Langmai Hill were integrated into a single God with the name "Langmai Ningthou". The personal names became the aliases or various forms of the God. With this, the tribal society of the Selloi Langmai people evolved into a chiefdom. This chiefdom later rose to the Angom dynasty.

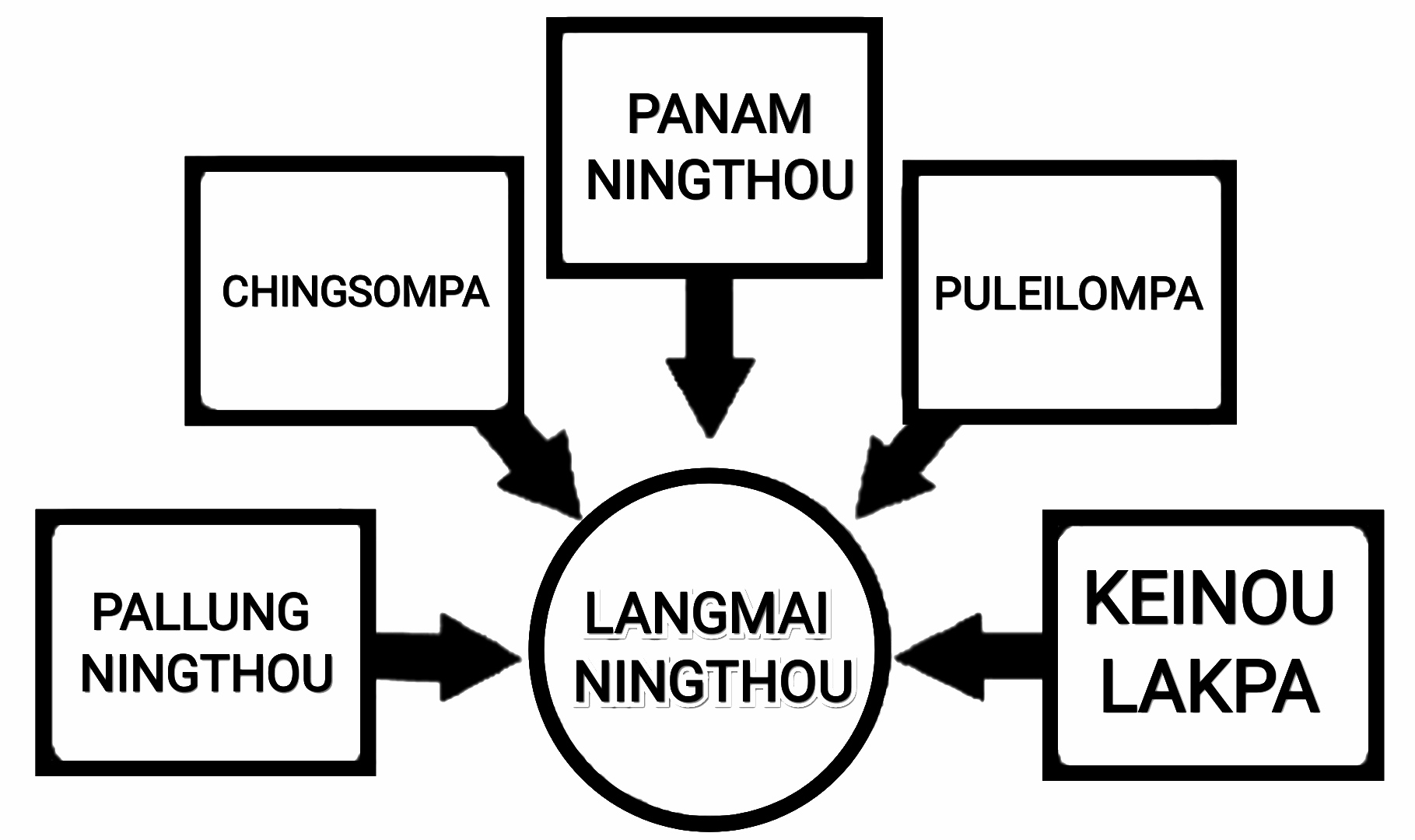
The five deities venerated in the five divisions of the Selloi Langmai hills gradually merged into one God with the name "Langmai Ningthou" (lit. King of the Langmais).

According to the Naothingkhong Phambal Kaba PuYa, the position of the Langmai Ningthou (lit. Langmai King) rose to the highest level of the Umang Lai God. He acquired a new title "Nongpok Ningthou". It took place after the uprooting of the Selloi Langmai people by the Meetei King Ura Konthouba in the 6-7th century AD. With the end of the ethnic conflict, the Selloi Langmai people merged into the Meitei ethnicity. Their deity "Langmai Ningthou" got renamed as "Nongpok Ningthou" (lit. Sovereign of the East). The name of the God was given by the Meiteis. The God originally belonged to the Selloi Langmai people. These group of people lived in the East of the Kangla, the capital of the Meitei kingdom.

The Cheitharol Kumbaba mentioned the God for the first time during the reign of King Khagemba (1597 AD-1652 AD).

== Mythology ==
God Nongpok Ningthou and Goddess Panthoibi are true lovers. They first met when the goddess was wandering in the open meadows, bathing and sporting in the cool waters of the running river. She was captivated by the handsome looks and towering personality of Nongpok Ningthou (alias Angoupa Kainou Chingsangsompa). They fell in love at first sight. He proposed her to elope with him. But the already married goddess didn't accept the instant proposal very soon because it was not even five days passed after her wedding. She insisted him to spend some time.

The two lovers met secretly but regularly many times. Panthoibi's behavior causes her in-laws to have suspicion over her. Her mortal husband tried to win her heart with many tricks. But these were useless to the goddess. Nongpok Ningthou eloped with Goddess Panthoibi, his true lover, wearing the attires of the Tangkhuls.

Nongpok Ningthou and Panthoibi, the two divine lovers, united on the Nongmaiching Hills. Their joyous union was celebrated with dances and music by the divine beings. These celebration gave birth to the Lai Haraoba festival.

In another version of the story, Nongpok Ningthou met goddess Panthoibi for the first time when she was helping her father at jhum cultivation (Slash-and-burn). They fell in love at first sight without no conversation. But Panthoibi was married to another man against her will. She left her husband's house to search for her true beloved. Nongpok Ningthou also left his home for the same purpose. The lovers met at the Kangla. Kangla became the place of their divine union. So, it is considered to be an auspicious place of coronation of the Meitei kings.

== In ancient texts ==
In ancient Meitei language texts like the Langkol Chingkoipa, the Nongmaiching Chingkoipa, the Panthoibi Khongul, the Panthoibi Naheirol, God Nongpok Ningthou is described as the ultimate lover of goddess Panthoibi (aka Nongpok Leima).

=== Langkol Chingkoipa ===
In the ancient Meitei language text "Langkol Chingkoipa" (aka. "Langgol Chinggoiba"), the affairs between Nongpok Ningthou and Panthoibi we're mentioned as follows:

When Panthoibi, the Meitei princess, was sporting with her paramour Nongpok Ningthou, she reminded him of the crack of dawn and of the fear of them being seen by her mother-in-law Manu Tekngā. Henceforth the slope has been known as Chingnung Shoy.

— "Langkol Chingkoipa" ("Langgol Chinggoiba")

=== Nongmaiching Chingkoipa ===
In the ancient Meitei language text "Nongmaiching Chingkoipa" (aka. "Nongmaijing Chinggoiba"), God Nongpok Ningthou (aka Kainou Chingsomba) is mentioned in relation to the Nongmaiching mountain as follows:

O King, the mountain situated in the east and beyond the river is the abode of Kainou Chingsomba, lord of the Langmais.

— "Nongmaiching Chingkoipa" (aka. "Nongmaijing Chinggoiba")

=== Panthoibi Naheirol ===
The ancient Meitei language text Panthoibi Naheirol (Meitei: ꯄꯥꯟꯊꯣꯏꯕꯤ ꯅꯥꯍꯩꯔꯣꯜ, romanized: pānthoibī nāheirōl) describes about the romantic affairs of God Nongpok Ningthou and his ladylove Panthoibi. It tells about how Nongpok Ningthou suggested a plan to Panthoibi, according to which Panthoibi left her former husband's house (house of the Khaba dynasty) by tricking her in laws, and then stayed at her parental house, and then finally united with her ultimate lover in the Langmai mountains by tricking her mother.

As per the plan, Panthoibi pretended to be unwell. Her mother mentioned the names of some gods, whom she (Panthoibi's mother) believed that they could cure her daughter's illness. She mentioned Wangpulen (Wangbren), Thangching (Thangjing) and Koupalu (Koubru). As none of them are Panthoibi's paramours, Panthoibi pretended that her health got worsened up at the mention of every single man. Finally, her mother mentioned Nongpok Ningthou Kainou Chingsomba as follows:

O daughter, in the eastern region there is one who has conquered Kyang of Burma and whose dominion extends far into the north. He is also regarded as an able physician for all, irrespective of one's standing in life. Let me send for him.

— Panthoibi's mother telling her daughter in the "Panthoibi Naheirol"

As a reply to her mother, Panthoibi praised her lover Nongpok Ningthou as follows:

As I told you there is one who is reigning supreme in the Langmai Hills on whose slope the sun shines first. He is so powerful that he can walk in the air stepping on the clouds and can circumambulate the world seven times a day without ever showing weariness. He is my physician.

— Panthoibi telling her mother in the "Panthoibi Naheirol"

Panthoibi insisted her mother to call him as soon as possible. Upon being called, Nongpok Ningthou arrived in a wink. Nongpok Ningthou pretended to examine and to cure her fake illness. After a short period of time, Panthoibi pretended to be completely recovered from her fake illness. Panthoibi told her mother about the greatness of Nongpok Ningthou as a physician as well as a saviour of her life from the brink of death.

Taking advantage of the situation, Nongpok Ningthou was followed by Panthoibi and thus, they finally got united.

== Cults and shrines ==
Most of the surviving cults and shrines dedicated to God Langmai Ningthou (Nongpok Ningthou) are located in the Nongmaiching Hill (Selloi Langmai Hill) and its nearby areas.

A few of the most prominent shrines include: (1) Nongpok at Yairipok, (2) Panam Ningthou at Andro, (3) Nongpok Ningthou at Khoirom, (4) Pureiromba at Lamlai, (5) Nongpok Ningthou at Engourok (Ingourok), (6) Pureiromba at Naharup, (7) Nongpok Ningthou at Takhel, (8) Pureiromba at Bamon Kampu, (9) Nongpok Ningthou at Charangpat Maning, (10) Waroi Ching Malang Lamhuiba at Waroi Ching, (11) Nongpok at Chandrakhong.

These shrines are under the institution of the Umang Laism. However, there are many shrines of God Langmai Ningthou independent from the Umang Laism. Examples include Chingyai, Kharong, Isingchaibi, Nungpak Khul, Chingoi, etc. Due to the independence from the Umang Laism, these shrines were absorbed into Hinduism during the post-Charairongba era in Manipur. One notable instance is the shrine of Chingyai. The shrine of Chingyai was converted into the cult of Hindu God Shiva Mahadeva during the reign of King Chandrakirti (1850 AD-1886 AD).

Khwairakpa Erel is the most famous sacred site dedicated to Nongpok Ningthou (alias Khwairakpa) in Assam. It is an island in the middle of the Barak River.

== In art ==
=== Dance ===
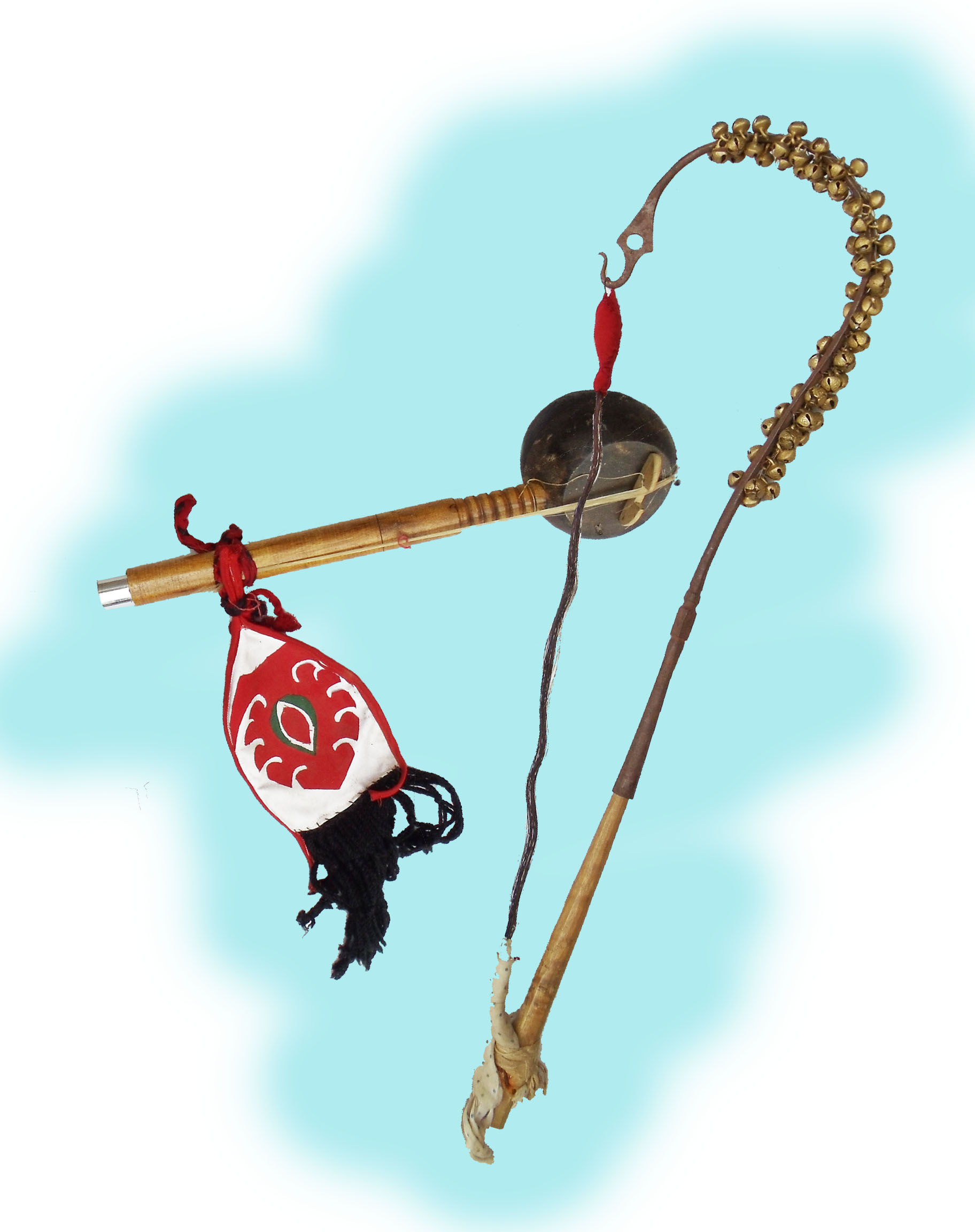
Pena (musical instrument) is an integral part of the music performance of the Panthoibi Jagoi.

Panthoibi Jagoi is a duet dance form that is accompanied by a romantic song sung by a maibi and a penakhongba (Pena (musical instrument) player). It has reference to the love of Nongpok Ningthou for his consort Panthoibi.

The Tangkhul Nurabi Loutaba is an enactment of the repartee between Tangkhul Pakhang (Nongpok Ningthou) and Nurabi (Panthoibi). The two players dress up in Tangkhul attires of farming in the field. This is performed on the last night of the Kanglei Haraoba (a form of Lai Haraoba).

== Festival ==
The Nongpok Ningthou Panthoibi Haraoba festival is celebrated for five consecutive days every year in Manipur. One of the grand celebrations is organized in Kwatha.

== Sacred sites ==
- The deity Nongpok Ningthou and his goddess Panthoibi have a pantheon Nongpok Ningthou Panthoibi Hill in Yairipok, Manipur.
- Every year, thousands of devotees throng to the sacred site of God Nongpok Ningthou to seek his blessings near the Jiri river in Assam.
- In a place Kwatha, there is a sacred place of God Nongpok Ningthou and his goddess Panthoibi, where devotees gather to worship them.
- There is a sacred site of God Nongpok Ningthou and his goddess Panthoibi at Yanglem Leikai.
- Nongpok Ningthou Laishang, a sacred site of the god is also situated in Bishnupur, Manipur, India.

== See also ==
- Royal stars
