= Wangpulen =

Meitei God of the underwater world

- water, rain, flood, disease
- Member of Lainingthous and Maikei Ngaakpa Lais
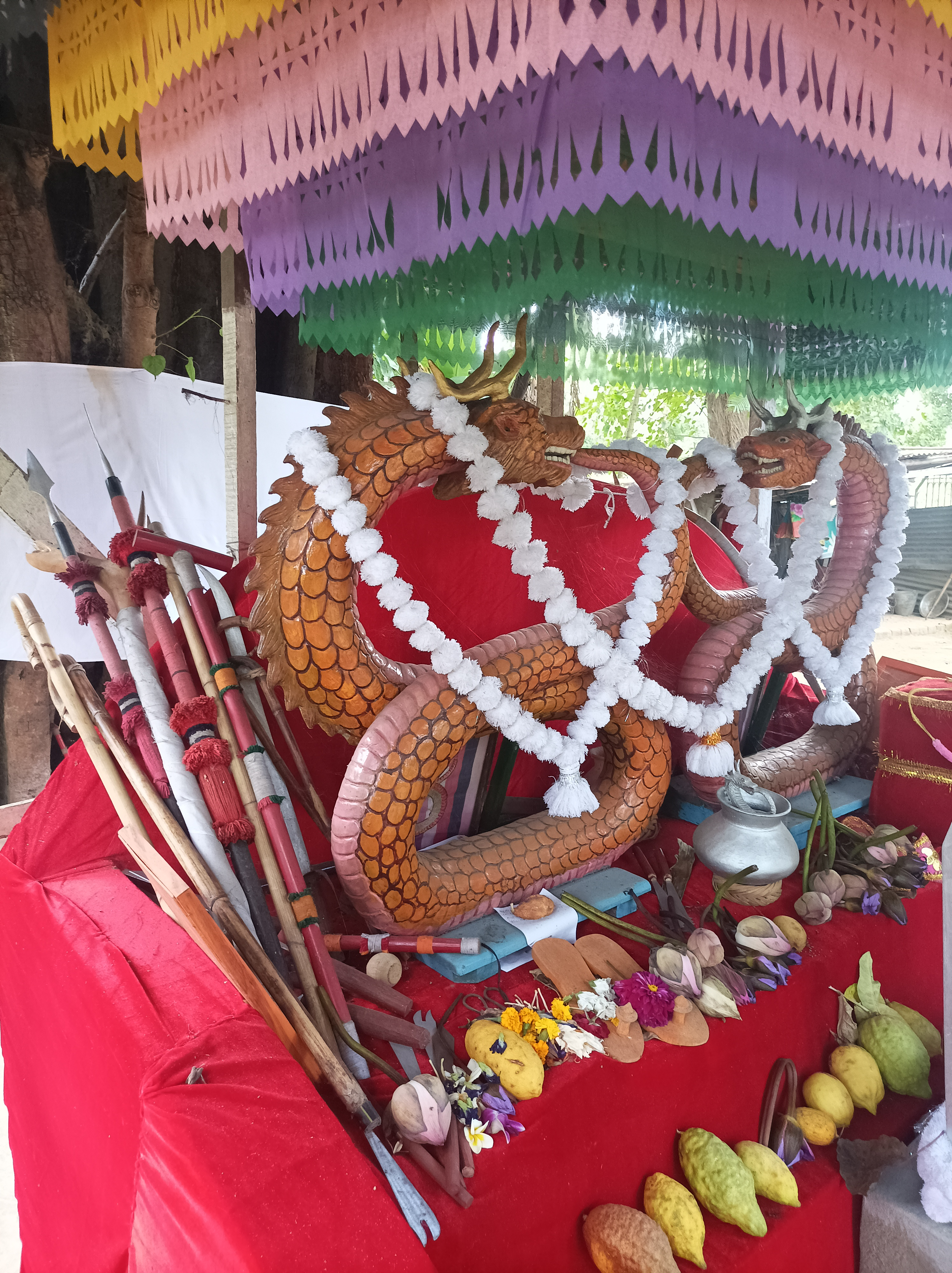
- Wangpulen and his divine consort, worshipped in the forms of Meitei dragons, inside the Kangla Fort in Imphal
- Other names: Khana Chaoba
- Affiliation: Meitei mythology and Sanamahism
- Major cult center: Sugnu
- Abode: underwater world
- Texts: Wakoklon Heelel Thilel Salai Amailon Pukok
- Gender: Male
- Region: Manipur
- Ethnic group: Meitei ethnicity
- Festivals: Lai Haraoba
- Consort: Shangnu
- Offspring: Lok Ningthou

Equivalents
- Greek: Poseidon, Oceanus

Wangpulen (Meitei: ꯋꯥꯡꯄꯨꯂꯦꯟ) is the god of water, rain, flood, disease and sickness in Meitei mythology and Sanamahism. He is the ruler of the underwater world. He is the Lord of the rivers. The guardianship of the south eastern direction is alluded to Wangbren and the other directions to Koupalu (north west), Marjing (north east) and Thangjing (south west). He is one of the Umang Lais.

He has a strong connection with the Anāl Naga people for marrying a lady from Khullen village. Among the cult centres dedicated to him, the one at Sugnu is the most significant in Meitei pantheon.

== Description ==
In the Wakoklon Heelel Thilel Salai Amailon Pukok Puya, Wangbren is called Khana Chaopa Wangpulen. According to the text, He is one of the seven Laipungthous and one of the manifestations of the Supreme God, Ipung Loinapa Apakpa.

== Mythology ==
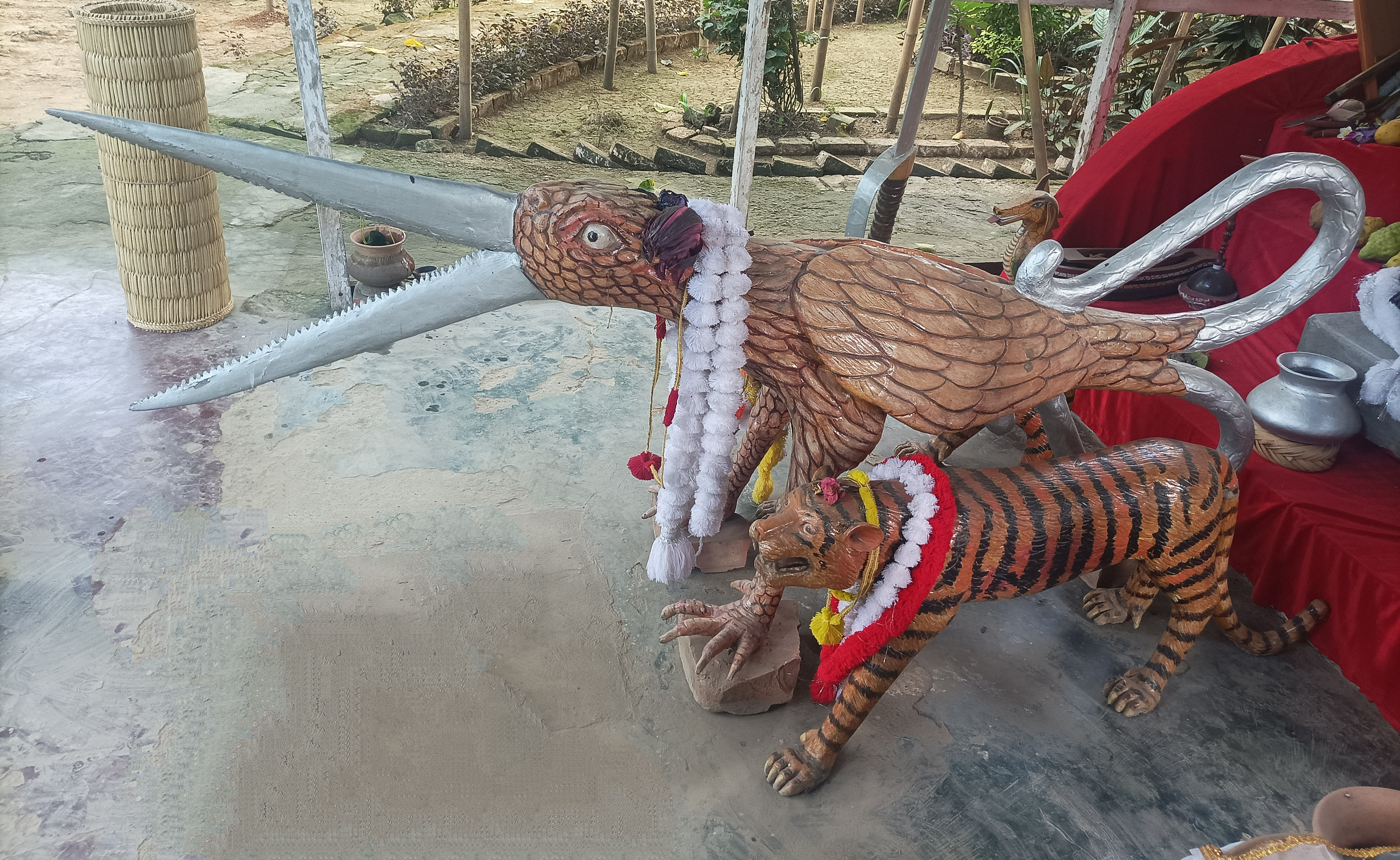
Statues of divine scissor bird (avian shear) and tigers in the sacred site of Lord Wangpulen (Wangbren) inside the Kangla Fort in Imphal

Once Wangpulen went to the village of the Anāl people, disguising Himself as a human. He fell in love with a beautiful girl, Shangnu. The maiden was also attracted to helps good looks. The girl's affair with a stranger angered the community. The young men of the village challenged Wangbren to fight. There were competitions in race, stone throwing, and archery. If he failed, he would be killed. But he won all the challenges, and he took Shangnu away to his divine abode.

== Worship ==
Whenever anyone is drowned, Wangpulen is worshipped according to the traditional rites and rituals. They did so in a belief that there will be no further deaths in water. Whenever unusual flood water currents are seen, especially in rivers, He is worshipped by people to save them from drowning and other mishaps.

If a drowned person's corpse is not recovered, then a portion of the trunk of palash tree is cremated. It is done in a belief that Wangpulen might have kept the corpse at a sacred place.

Wangpulen is worshipped by offering fruits, flowers and kabok. The rites and rituals are performed by the maibas. It is to ward off the diseases, illness or sickness caused by the water god. Examples include skin diseases, cold and cough, diarrhoea, etc.

== Cults and Shrines ==
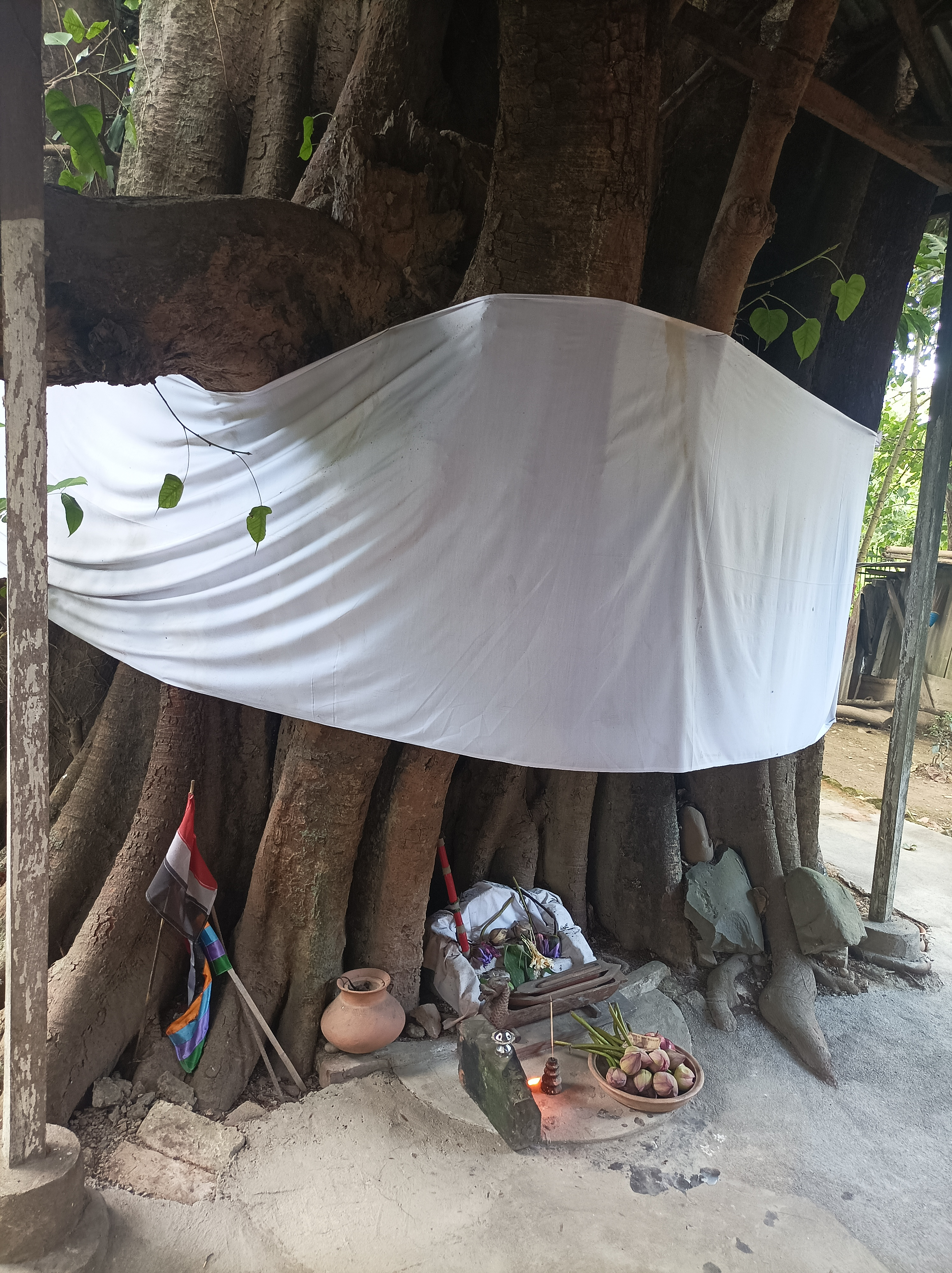
An old sacred banyan tree in the shrine of Lord Wangpulen (Wangbren) inside the Kangla Fort in Imphal

A sacred shrine dedicated to Wangpulen still exists today in the Sugnu village. Annually, the non-Christian Anal villagers give offerings to their priest. The priest took and offer the articles to the God in Sugnu.

Inside the Kangla, the State Government of Manipur is to renovate and reconstruct the holy altars dedicated to God Wangpulen and other deities.

In 2010, a temple dedicated to God Wangpulen was constructed at Wangoi, Manipur. The temple building construction costs ₹8 lakh (equivalent to ₹18 lakh or US$19,000 in 2023).

== See also ==
- Koupalu - north west protector
- Marjing - north east protector
- Lok Ningthou - south protector
- Thangching - south west protector
