= Panthoibi =

Ancient Meitei goddess

- Goddess of civilization, courage, fertility, handicraft, love, victory, warfare and wisdom Deified Meitei princess of Ningthouja dynasty Queen of the Nongmaiching Mountains
- Member of Lairembis and Umang Lais
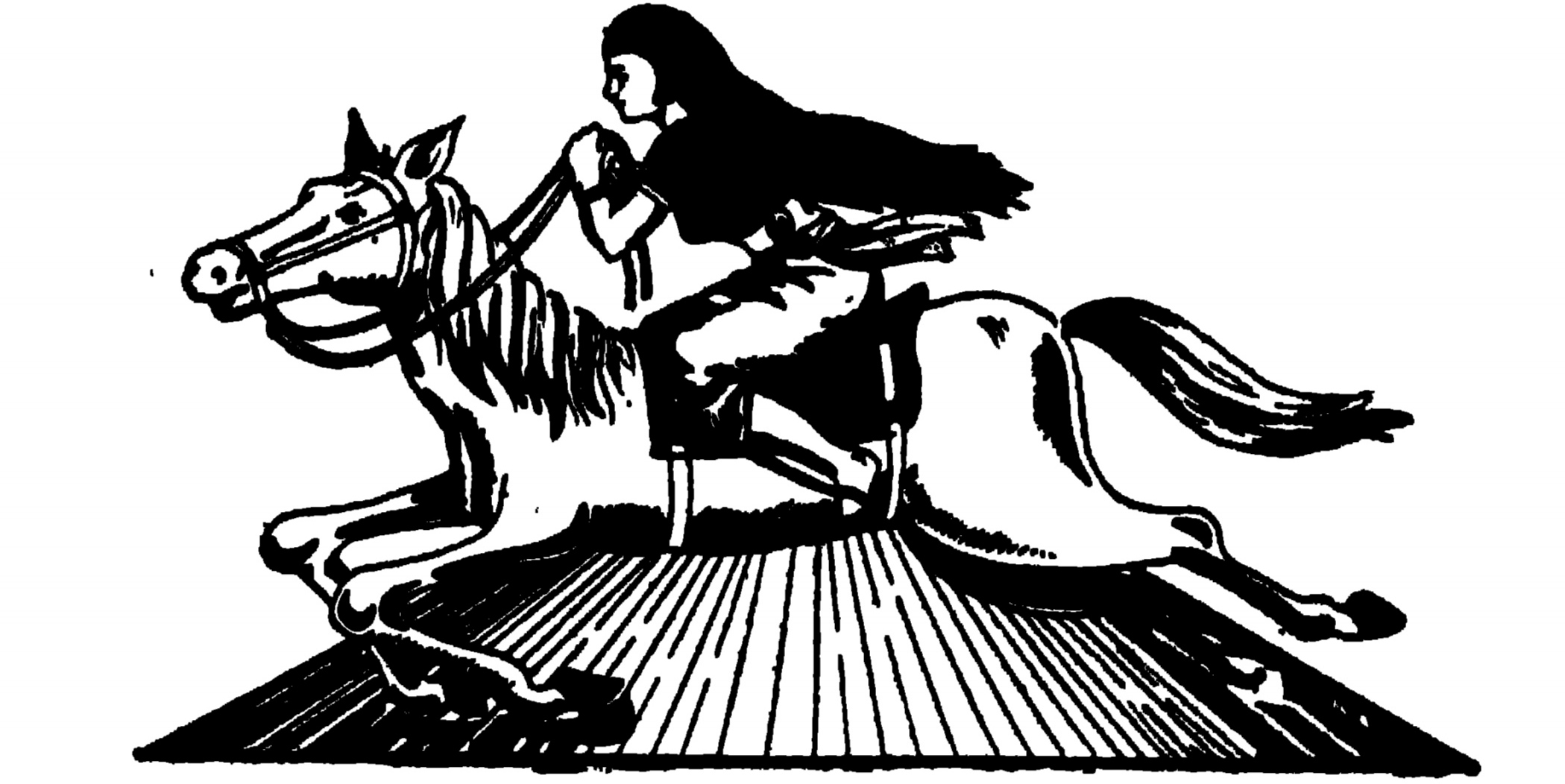
- Panthoibi riding her white horse, as described in the Panthoibi Khonggul.
- Other names: Ayang Leima; Koirel Leima (Old Manipuri: Koilel Leima); Koiren Leima (Old Manipuri: Koilen Leima); Nongpok Leima
- Affiliation: Meitei mythology (Manipuri mythology) and Meitei religion (Sanamahism)
- Major cult center: Nongmaiching Hill (alias Selloi Langmai Hill)
- Abode: Nongmaiching Hill (alias Selloi Langmai Hill)
- Weapons: Spear and Sword
- Artifacts: Kajenglei
- Animals: white horse or tiger
- Symbol: Kajenglei
- Mount: white horse or tiger
- Texts: Langkol Chingkoipa; Panthoibi Khongul; Panthoibi Naheirol; Numit Kappa
- Gender: female
- Region: Ancient Kangleipak (early Manipur)
- Ethnic group: Meitei ethnicity
- Festivals: Panthoibi Iratpa; Lai Haraoba
- Parents: Namungbi (mother)
- Consorts: Tarang Khoinucha and Nongpok Ningthou

Equivalents
- Etruscan: Menrva, Turan
- Greek: Athena, Aphrodite
- Hindu: Durga
- Roman: Minerva, Venus
- Egyptian: Neith, Hathor and Isis
- Chinese: Jiutian Xuannü

Panthoibi (Meitei: ꯄꯥꯟꯊꯣꯏꯕꯤ, romanized: Paanthoibee, Old Manipuri: ꯄꯥꯟꯊꯣꯢꯄꯤ, romanized: Panthoipi), also known as Nongpok Leima (Meitei for 'Queen of the East'), is a goddess associated with civilization, courage, fertility, handicraft, love, victory, warfare and wisdom in the mythology and religion of Ancient Kangleipak (early Manipur). She is a consort of the God Nongpok Ningthou. She is considered to be one of the divine incarnations of Leimarel Sidabi and is also identified as a form of Goddess Nongthang Leima. She is worshipped mainly by the Meitei people in Manipur, Assam, Tripura, Bangladesh and Myanmar.

The personality of Panthoibi and other Meitei goddesses like Emoinu and Phouoibi depict as well as influence the courage, independence, righteousness and social honour of Meitei women.

== History ==
According to the Panthoibi Khongul, the worship of goddess Panthoibi began in the era of the Khaba dynasty.

In 1100 AD, the Loyumba Shinyen mentions the Heishnam clan's service to goddess Panthoibi. The text addresses her as the most adored Meetei goddess.

In the 17th century, Panthoibi appeared as a war goddess riding on a tiger. The Cheitharol Kumbaba's first record of the building of a temple of Panthoibi was in the year 1686. The same text's first record of the making of her statue was in the year 1699.

In the 18th century, there was a decline in the worship of Panthoibi mirrored a rise of Vaishnavism in Manipur. Hindu King Garib Niwaj Pamheiba (1709-1748) pulled down her temples and broke her statues, and from the 18th century onwards, Panthoibi was treated as a manifestation of the Hindu goddess Durga or as her incarnation or as her manifestation. The identity of Panthoibi was changed to that of Hindu goddess Durga. She was worshipped for five days in September – October.

No more temples to Panthoibi were built from 1700 until the modern era came. Since 1960s, the worship of Panthoibi has increased, beginning to replace the worship of Durga.

== Attributes and epithets ==
Panthoibi is regarded as self-confident and self-conscious with feminine pride. Legend says she has many incarnations, such as Phouoibi, goddess of grain. Panthoibi is regarded the ruling deity of birth and death. She is described in several ancient texts, including Panthoibi Khongul and Panthoibi Mingkheilol.

The Panthoibi Khonggul, an ancient Meitei language religious text dedicated to goddess Panthoibi says:

[...] you are the source of all living beings… both birth and death are your handiwork, you are the repository of all wealth; you can unravel the mystery of human souls and keep both the earth and the heaven jointly linked; you give shelter to the souls of living beings, keep them as beads are strung together; you are the highest of all goddesses and the most munificent in bestowing blessings…

— Panthoibi Khonggul

Different personifications of Panthoibi are found in different texts. According to the poetic song Anoirol, Panthoibi appears as Khabi Lengnao Mombi, an ancient priestess. She is also regarded as an incarnation of goddess Nongthang Leima, another goddess amaibi.

Panthoibi is the goddess of kang, a popular Meitei indoor game. Kang players pray to her before and during the game, believing that one cannot do his or her best at the game without her blessings.

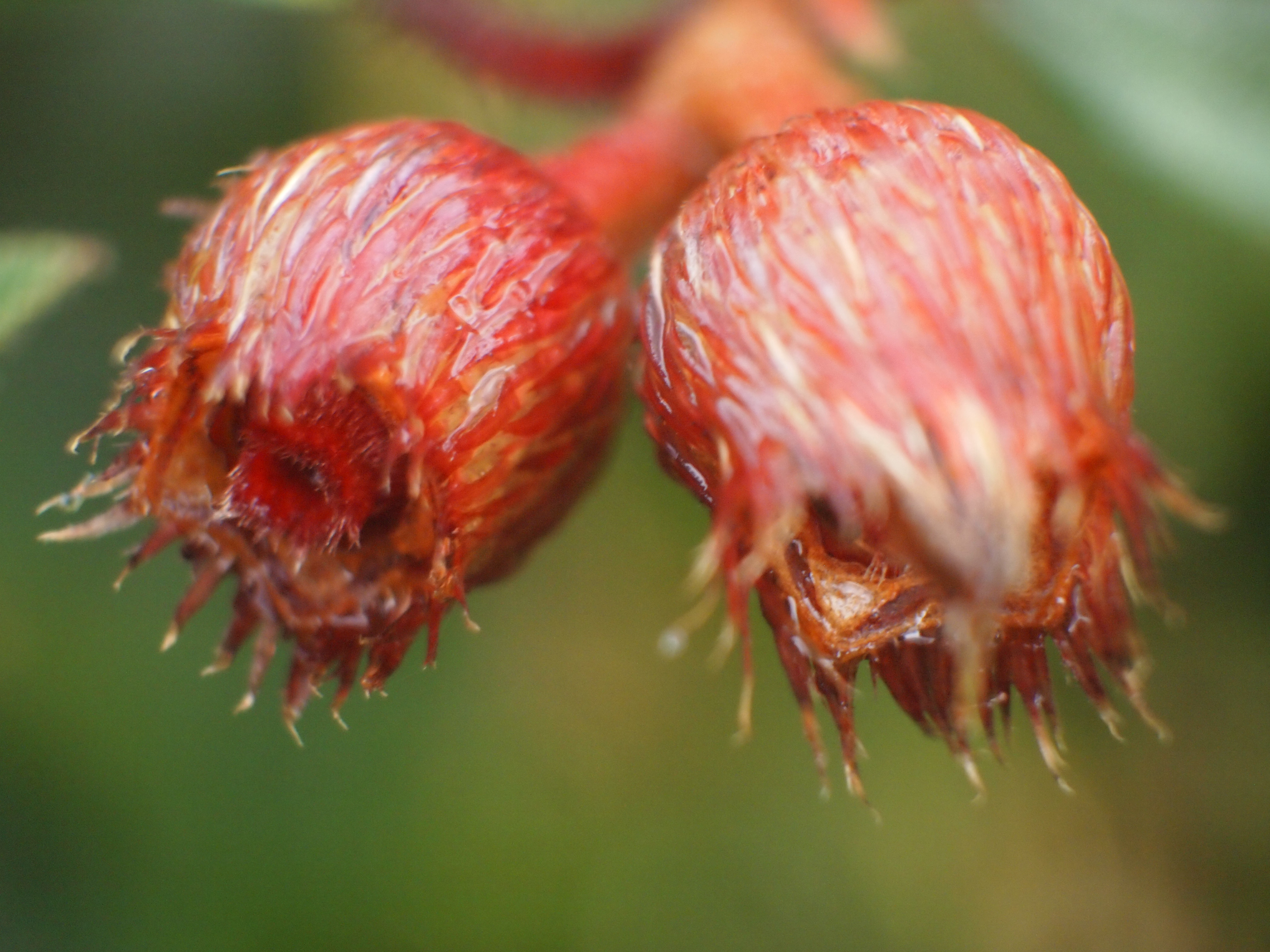
Melastoma malabathricum

Panthoibi is also the patron deity of potters and weavers. After the creation of the human beings, Panthoibi realised that they needed vessels to store food and water. Looking around, she saw a flower, nura khudonglei. She imitated the shape and the design of the flower to produce a pot and gave art of pottery to the women of Manipur. In another account, she was taught the art of pottery by goddess Leimarel Sidabi before her disappearance,

Panthoibi was inspired by a spider spinning its web to invent the arts of spinning and weaving. In another legendary account, Panthoibi was taught the art of weaving by Leishambi, the goddess of creation.

Haoreima, a woman from the hills whose lover was beheaded by her husband, is another incarnation of Panthoibi. She turned into tortured spirit and goddess of tragic love and separation and is also associated with death and fertility.

Panthoibi reacts badly to bad human conduct. A person who spits near her shrine may they cannot turn their neck and can only be cured by a ritual performed by a maiba, or priestess.

Panthoibi is also regarded as one of the divine incarnations of the goddess Leimarel Sidabi. and as an incarnation of the goddess Nongthang Leima.

== In Mythology and Literature ==
The ancient Meitei language text Langkol Chingkoipa describes the romantic affair between deified Meitei princess Panthoibi and her lover Nongpok Ningthou.

Panthoibi is a lady of surpassing beauty, a daughter of a Meitei king. Many kings and princes wanted to marry her, including King Shapaiba, from the western part of the valley of Kangleipak. He promised that if she married him, he would construct good roads, beautiful bridges, and a spacious house and fish ponds, but she did not accept his proposal. Finally, Panthoibi was married to Tarang Khoinucha, the son of King Khaba Sokchrongba and Queen Teknga of the Khaba dynasty.

Panthoibi met the god Nongpok Ningthou for the first time when she was walking in open meadows, bathing and playing in the cool waters of the running river. She was attracted to his handsome looks and towering personality. The two fell in love at first sight. Nongpok Ningthou asked Panthoibi to elope with him. Panthoibi and Nongpok Ningthou secretly met many times, and her in-laws became suspicious. Her mortal husband tried to win her heart many times, but failed. Panthoibi and Nongpok Ningthou finally eloped, escaping the palace disguised as Tangkhuls.

The two divine lovers were ultimately united on the sun-washed slopes of the Nongmaiching Hills. Their happy union was celebrated with dances and music by the gods. This celebration gave birth to the Lai Haraoba festival.

In another version of the story, Panthoibi first met Nongpok Ningthou when she was helping her father to slash-and-burn. The two fell in love at first sight, but Panthoibi was already married to another man against her will. She left her husband's house to search for her true love; Nongpok Ningthou also left his home for the same purpose. The two lovers met at the Kangla, which became the place of their divine union and it became the place of coronation of the Meitei kings.

=== Panthoibi and the Sun God ===
According to the Numit Kappa, a mythological epic written in the early 1st century CE, two suns shone in the ancient sky. One was wounded by an archer. The two brother suns fled from their positions in the sky and hid for ten long days, leaving the world in darkness. No-one could work. Crops perished and cattle died. So, the ten kingly gods approached many divinities, asking each to plead with the sun gods. Finally, the ten gods asked Princess Panthoibi to help. She knew many mysteries and secrets, and showed them magical ceremonies to lure the sun gods back. The unwounded sun god returned to his place, but the wounded one never returned.

== Ancient texts ==
=== Panthoibi Naheirol ===
The Panthoibi Naheirol (Meitei: ꯄꯥꯟꯊꯣꯏꯕꯤ ꯅꯥꯍꯩꯔꯣꯜ, romanized: pānthoibī nāheirōl) describes about the love of goddess Panthoibi for her lover Nongpok Ningthou. It tells about how she left her former husband's house (house of the Khaba dynasty) by tricking her in laws and stayed at her parental house and then finally united with her ultimate lover in the Langmai mountains by tricking her mother. Before coming back to her parental house, Panthoibi and Nongpok Ningthou were already in love with each other. So, every action of Panthoibi and Nongpok Ningthou were done according to the two's pre-plans. According to the text, by pretending to be unwell, Panthoibi told her mother as follows:

O mother how have I fallen under the spell of an evil spirit? My body aches in every part and all the time I am in a daze as if I clambered up a steep hill-top and rushed down into a deep gorge... Have you any medicine-man who can cure me?

— Panthoibi to her mother in the Panthoibi Naheirol

Her mother Namungbi told her about Wangpulen Khana Chaopa, the deity of water, who rules in the southern realms of Kangleipak. She assured her daughter that he could definitely cure her illness. But on hearing her mother's reply, which Panthoibi didn't want, Panthoibi pretended to be worse in her health than before. Then her mother told her about another deity, who was guarding the south-west direction (Thangching), which she (Panthoibi's mother) believed that he could certainly cure her daughter's illness. At this too, since Panthoibi was still unsatisfied, she pretended to be almost near her death. Then, her mother told her about God Koupalu (Koubru), the ruler of the northwestern realms of Kangleipak. Still unwanted and unsatisfied, Panthoibi pretended to be worsened up. To her mother's eyes, Panthoibi's illness was deteriorated.

Finally, her mother told her about Nongpok Ningthou as follows:

O daughter, in the eastern region there is one who has conquered Kyang of Burma and whose dominion extends far into the north. He is also regarded as an able physician for all, irrespective of one's standing in life. Let me send for him.

— Panthoibi's mother to her daughter in the Panthoibi Naheirol

Hearing her lover's name from her mother's words, Panthoibi insisted her to call him as soon as possible. Upon the calling, Nongpok Ningthou arrived immediately. Sitting by the side of the ailing princess Panthoibi, Nongpok Ningthou examined her illness. After a short period of time, Panthoibi told her mother of her complete recovery from her illness. In front of her mother, she praised for the great ability of Nongpok Ningthou as a physician and the saviour of her life from the brink of death. Taking advantage of the situation, Panthoibi followed her lover, and thus, she finally united with Nongpok Ningthou.

== Festivals ==
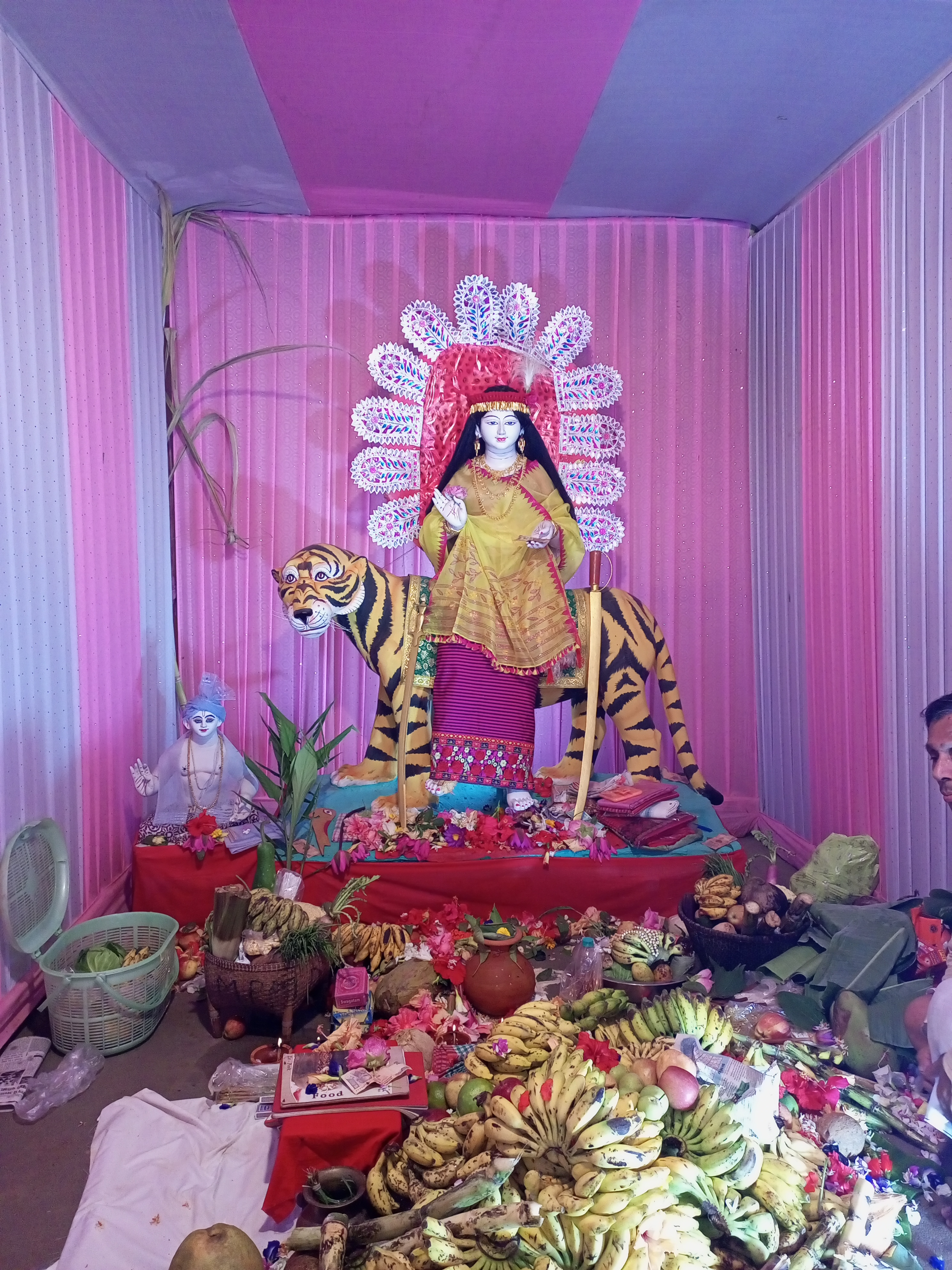
Statue of Panthoibi during Panthoibi Iratpa festival celebrated at Hojai Natun Bazar, Assam

=== Panthoibi Iratpa ===
Panthoibi Iratpa (Panthoibi Eratpa) is a religious festival dedicated to goddess Panthoipi. It is celebrated every year.

=== Lai Haraoba ===
Panthoibi and Nongpok Ningthou are at the core of Lai Haraoba festival. Their legend finds an important place in the lyrical literature of Ancient Manipur.

== In art forms ==
=== Panthoibi Jagoi ===
Panthoibi Jagoi is a duet dance form. It is accompanied by a song of love. It is sung by a maibi and a Pena Khongba (Pena player). It has reference to the love of Panthoibi and Nongpok Ningthou. It also depicts the process of weaving.

=== Panthoibi Sheishak ===
Panthoibi Sheishak is a song sung in the Lai Haraoba festival. It is performed by the Pena players. It retells the story of Panthoibi searching for her beloved Nongpok Ningthou.

It was the time of setting sun when the bright light on the face of the hills deceased, and the rising smoke in the hills gradually receded to meet the rising smoke from the plain. Panthoibi was unaware of the whereabouts of Nongpok Ningthou and in her helpless condition she beseeched the tall trees of the hills and the leafy ones of the plains to help her find her beloved.

It is one of the 9 singing styles (tunes) sung in the Lai Haraoba.

=== Tangkhul Nurabi Loutaba ===
Tangkhul Nurabi Loutaba is an enactment of the repartee between Tangkhul Pakhang (an incarnation of Nongpok Ningthou) and Tangkhul Nurabi (an incarnation of Panthoibi). The two repartee players dress up in Tangkhul Naga costumes of farming in the field. This is performed on the last night of the Kanglei Haraoba (one of the 4 forms of Lai Haraoba festival).

== Namesakes ==
- The Panthoibi Emporium is a trading center in New Delhi, India.
- The Panthoibi Housing Finance Company Limited is a housing financial company in Imphal.
- The Panthoibi Manipur Handicrafts Emporium is an emporium in Delhi, India. It mainly sells handmade silk products from Manipur.

== Bibliography ==
- Ariba Manipuri Sahityagee Saklon by Nabachandra, Polem
- Chinglon Laihui by Manglem Meitei, Lairenjam
- Erat Laisol by Singh, Khulem Chandrashekhar
- Khannashi Neinnashi Leishatpa Puya by Manglem Meitei,l
- Lairemjam Manglem Gi Lai Haraoba by Manglem Meitei, Lairenjam
- Langgol Chinggoirol by Singh, Kulchandra Ngariyambam
- Manipuree Funggawaree Part 1 by Singh, Kabrabam Neelakanta
- Manipuree Funggawaree Part 2 by Singh, Kabrabam Neelakanta
- Yek Taretki Meihourol by Manglem Meitei,l
- Yek Taret Ki Meihouron by Manglem Meitei,l
