= Nongmaiching Hill =

Hill in Imphal Valley, India

- Nongmaijing Hill
- Location within Manipur Location within India

Highest point
- Elevation: 5,133 ft (1,565 m)
- Prominence: 2,500 ft (760 m)
- Coordinates: 24.804°N 94.035°E

Naming
- Etymology: "Nongmaiching Mountain" or "Nongmaiching Hill" (see here)
- Native name: Nongmaijing Ching (Meitei)
- Pronunciation: /nong-māi-jīng chīng/
- Defining authority: Government of Manipur

Geography
- Location: Imphal Valley
- Country: India
- State: Manipur
- Region: Imphal Valley
- District: Imphal East district
- Biome: Nongmaiching Reserved Forest

Climbing
- First ascent: By religious pilgrims or priests in Antiquity
- Easiest route: hiking
- Normal route: Nongmaiching Chingka Lambi (Meitei for 'Nongmaiching mountain climbing route')

Nongmaiching Hill or Nongmaijing Hill, also known as the Selloi Langmai Ching, is a hill in the Imphal Valley in Manipur, India. It rises to the east of the Imphal City with a peak at an elevation of 5,133 feet (1,565 m) above sea level. It is a holy pilgrimage site for the Meitei people. In Meitei mythology and religion (Sanamahism), it is a sacred mountain and the abode of God Nongpok Ningthou and Goddess Panthoibi. In Meitei folklore, the Nongmaiching is described as the hill that produces "the seven days of a week".

== Etymology ==
According to many scholars including Thomas Callan Hodson of the Cambridge University, the Meitei language term "Nongmaiching" (Meitei: ꯅꯣꯡꯃꯥꯏꯆꯤꯡ) is derived from the terms, "nong" (Meitei: ꯅꯣꯡ), "mai" (Meitei: ꯃꯥꯏ) and "ching" (Meitei: ꯆꯤꯡ). Nong means sun or rain, mai means face or "in front of", and ching means hill or mountain. So, "Nongmaiching" means "the hill that fronts the rain or sun".

According to Tarak Chandra Das of the Calcutta University, the term "Nongmaiching" is translated as "the hill which rises to the east of Imphal and which is the scene of a rain-compelling ceremony."

The terms "Nongmaiching" and "Nongmaijing" are interchangeably used.

The term "Nongmaijing" may also mean Sunday in Meitei language (officially called Manipuri).

According to the "Guide to the gods" by Marjorie Leach, the term "Nongmaiching" is defined as "A hill god of the Meitheis, Manipur, Assam, India. (Hodson, 1908: 111)".

== Geography ==
The Nongmaiching lies to the eastern side of Imphal city. It separates Thoubal River valley from that of the Iril River and the Imphal River. The Nongmaiching is close to the Nongpok Sanjenbam, Imphal East.

== History ==
In the history of Ancient Kangleipak (early Manipur), the three out of the seven clans of Meitei ethnicity, namely the Mangang, the Luwang and the Angom are historically associated with the Nongmaiching.

Meitei King Konthouba defeated many tribal chiefs and controlled their villages of Shelloi (Selloi) and Longmai (Langmai), near the present day Nongmaiching.

== Religious associations ==
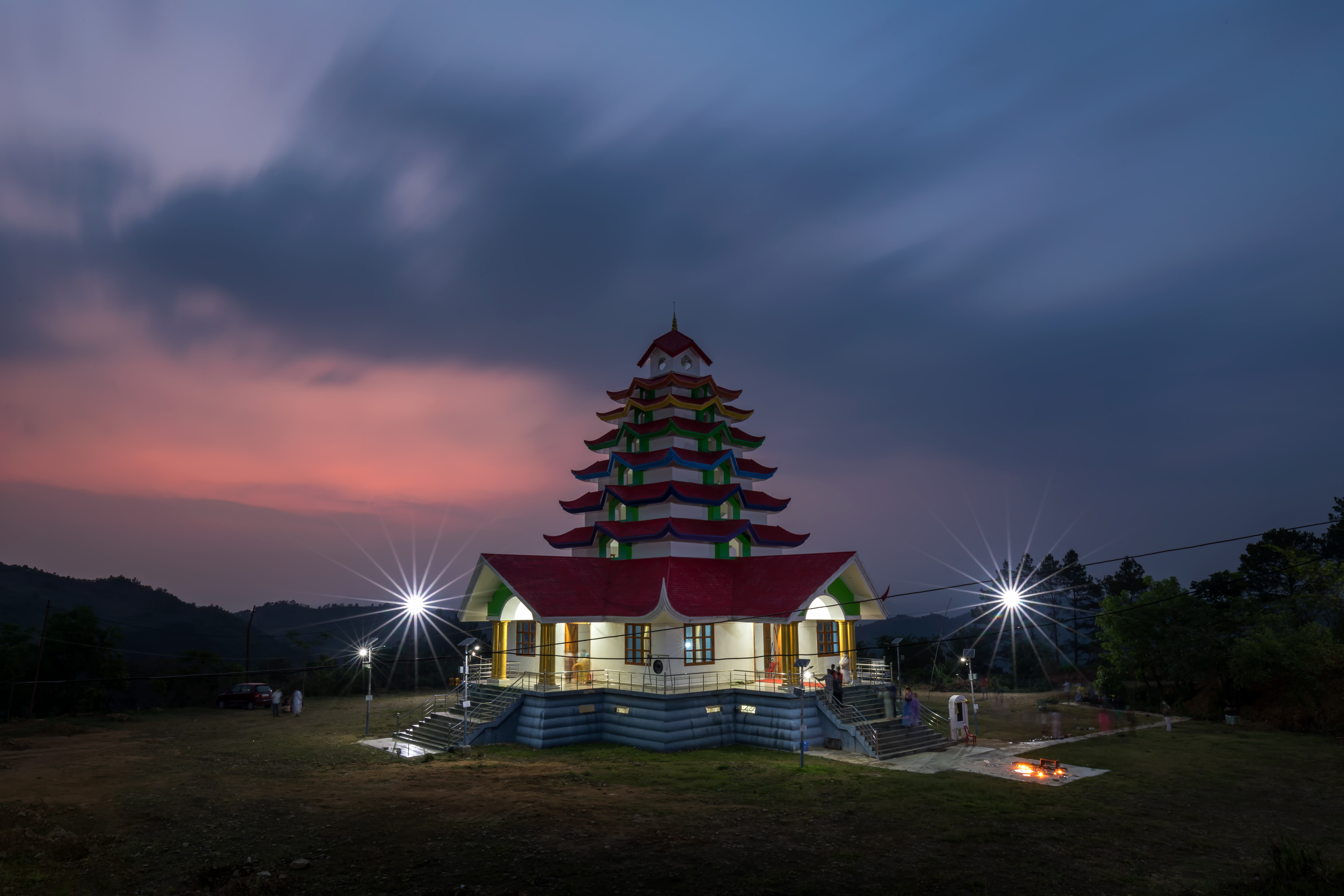
A temple dedicated to God Lainingthou Sanamahi, built in Meitei architecture, in the top of the Nongmaiching in Imphal East

The Nongmaiching is a holy pilgrimage site for the Meitei people. In Meitei religion (Sanamahism), the Nongmaiching is deeply associated with God Lainingthou Sanamahi and God Pakhangba. According to one legend, King Kangba kept an idol of God Sanamahi at a cave in the Nongmaiching.

The Nongmaiching is historically, mythologically and religiously associated with God Langmai Ningthou and Goddess Panthoibi. This is mentioned in the Panthoibi Khongul, an ancient Meitei text.

The Nongmaiching is the place where the Lai Haraoba was celebrated by the divine beings, after which it was imitated by the humans.

"Kanglei Haraoba" (Meitei: ꯀꯪꯂꯩ ꯍꯔꯥꯎꯕ), one of the major types of the Lai Haraoba ceremonial ritualistic festival, is associated with the Nongmaiching. As a part of the Lai Haraoba, the Kangleithokpa ritual was performed at the Nongmaiching. It represents the marriage of God Khoriphaba.

The Nongmaiching is the place where the final prayers for the worship ceremony associated with the three ancient Meitei deities, namely Pakhangba, Nongshaba and Yumjao Lairembi, are done.

The Loiyumba Shinyen Constitution mentions that the "Salam" family of Meitei ethnicity used to idolise the Langmai Ching (Nongmaiching mountain) and to act the role of God Nongpok Ningthou. The same text mentions that the "Nongmaithem" clan of Meitei ethnicity used to glorify the Langmai Ching (Nongmaiching).

== In literature ==
=== Nongmaiching Chingkoipa ===
The "Nongmaiching Chingkoipa" (also called, "Nongmaijing Chinggoiba") is an ancient Meitei language text which is an account on the Nongmaiching mountain. It describes the sprawling branches of the mountain extending from the North to the South of the Imphal Valley. The opening lines of the text describes the Nongmaiching to a king as follows:

“O King, the mountain situated in the east and beyond the river is the abode of Kainou Chingsomba, lord of the Langmais. They attain majestic heights, are washed by seven streams, project into nine ranges and abound with deep gorges and sun-drenched ridges... They catch first the sight of every onlooker and stand steadfast unshaken by great earthquakes as if held by strong iron pegs and with their peaks kissed by white flakes of cloud. Their slopes are smoothly carpeted green with pennyworts under the shadow of tall and robust plants of cane and they are also dotted with dense growth of tall reeds. And the gorges reverberate against the strong current of wind. Of these mountain ranges the bard would like to sing.”

— Nongmaiching Chingkoipa (Nongmaijing Chinggoiba)

Following these lines, the author describes on many cliffs, slopes and nearby areas of the Nongmaiching mountain.

=== Panthoibi Naheirol ===
In accordance to the ancient Meitei language text named "Panthoibi Naheirol" (Meitei: ꯄꯥꯟꯊꯣꯏꯕꯤ ꯅꯥꯍꯩꯔꯣꯜ, romanized: pānthoibī nāheirōl), Panthoibi pretended to be unwell in front of her mother, just to make her mother call physician Nongpok Ningthou for the treatment of her illness. While telling her mother about Nongpok Ningthou, princess Panthoibi mentioned the Nongmaiching (aka Langmai Ching) as follows:

“As I told you there is one who is reigning supreme in the Langmai Hills on whose slope the sun shines first.”

— Panthoibi to her mother in the "Panthoibi Naheirol"

== University of Sanamahi Culture ==
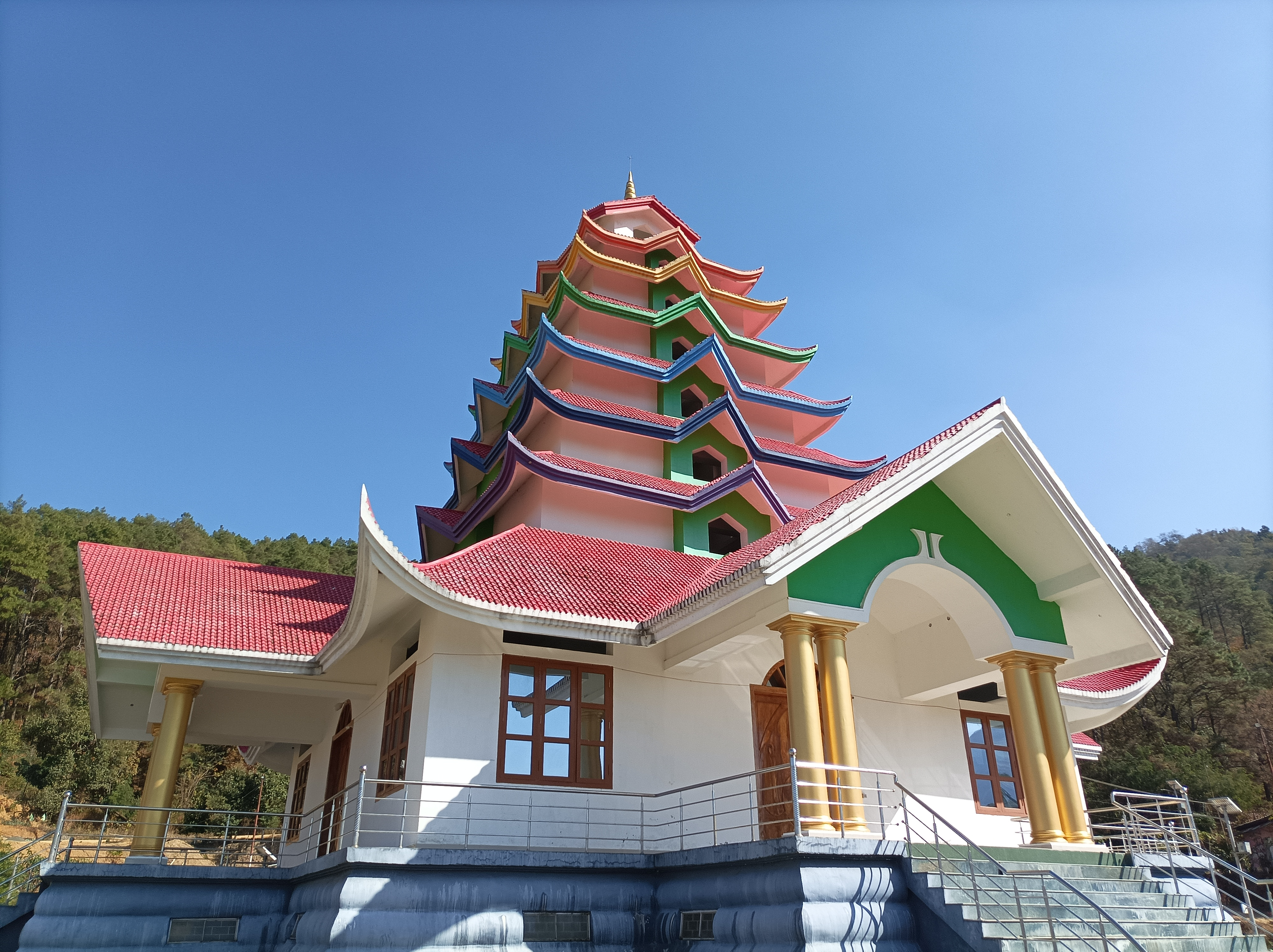
The Sanamahi Kiyong shrine is the central body of the University of Sanamahi Culture.

The University of Sanamahi Culture (Sanamahi Culture University) is a university under construction in the Nongmaiching Hills. It is deeply associated with the Sanamahi Kiyong shrine. The university aims to teach the future generations of people about the ancient Meitei culture of the Sanamahi religion. It will offer its students various subjects about indigenous art forms, dance forms, music, Thang-Ta and Sagol Kangjei (Meitei for 'polo') etc. Around ₹23,70,000 (equivalent to ₹6.0 million or US$62,000 in 2023) has been spent as of 2009 on the construction of the University and around ₹25 lakh (equivalent to ₹63 lakh or US$65,000 in 2023), including construction materials, were donated by volunteers. It is estimated that the total cost of the construction of the University will be around ₹7 crore (equivalent to ₹18 crore or US$1.8 million in 2023).

== World War II ==
During World War II, when there was an active combat between the troops of the United Kingdom and Japan in Manipur and other Northeast Indian states, the Nongmaiching serves as the most strategically important point in Imphal Valley.

== Ecotourism development ==
The Nongmaiching is one of the important hills and mountains in Manipur that have the strong potential for ecotourism development.

=== Reserve Forest ===
There is a reserved forest in the Nongmaiching.

=== Santhei Natural Park ===
The Santhei Natural Park located in the Santhei village of Andro, Imphal East, is at the foothills of the Nongmaiching. It is best known for its scenic natural beauty and serving as a picnic area.

=== Plant life ===
The Nongmaiching is the natural habitat for various plant species, including Cymbopogon flexuosus and Goniothalamus sesquipedalis.

== In popular culture ==
- Saktam Machet Machet Mang Macha Macha (Meitei: ꯁꯛꯇꯝ ꯃꯆꯦꯠ ꯃꯆꯦꯠ ꯃꯪ ꯃꯆꯥ ꯃꯆꯥ): A 1999 Meitei language prose book by Kamal, Toijamba
- Thaloi Nungkhailon (Meitei: ꯊꯥꯂꯣꯏ ꯅꯨꯡꯈꯥꯏꯂꯣꯟ): A Meitei language astronomy and astrology book by Bhudhachandra, Yumnamcha
- Tingkhanglakta Gulap (Meitei: ꯇꯤꯡꯈꯪꯂꯛꯇ ꯒꯨꯂꯥꯞ): A Meitei language poetry book by Kullachandra H

== See also ==
- Heingang Ching
  - Marjing Polo Complex
  - Marjing Polo Statue
- Kangla
  - Kangla Nongpok Thong
  - Kangla Nongpok Torban
- Mount Manipur
  - Mount Manipur Memorial

== Bibliography ==
- Dun, E. W. (1992) [1886], Gazetteer of Manipur, Manas Publications – via archive.org
- Hodson, T. C. (1908), The Meitheis, London: David Nutt – via archive.org
- Jhalajit Singh, R. K. (1992), A Short History of Manipur (Second ed.) – via archive.org
