= Kha-Nganpa =

Clan of the Indian ethnic group, Meetei

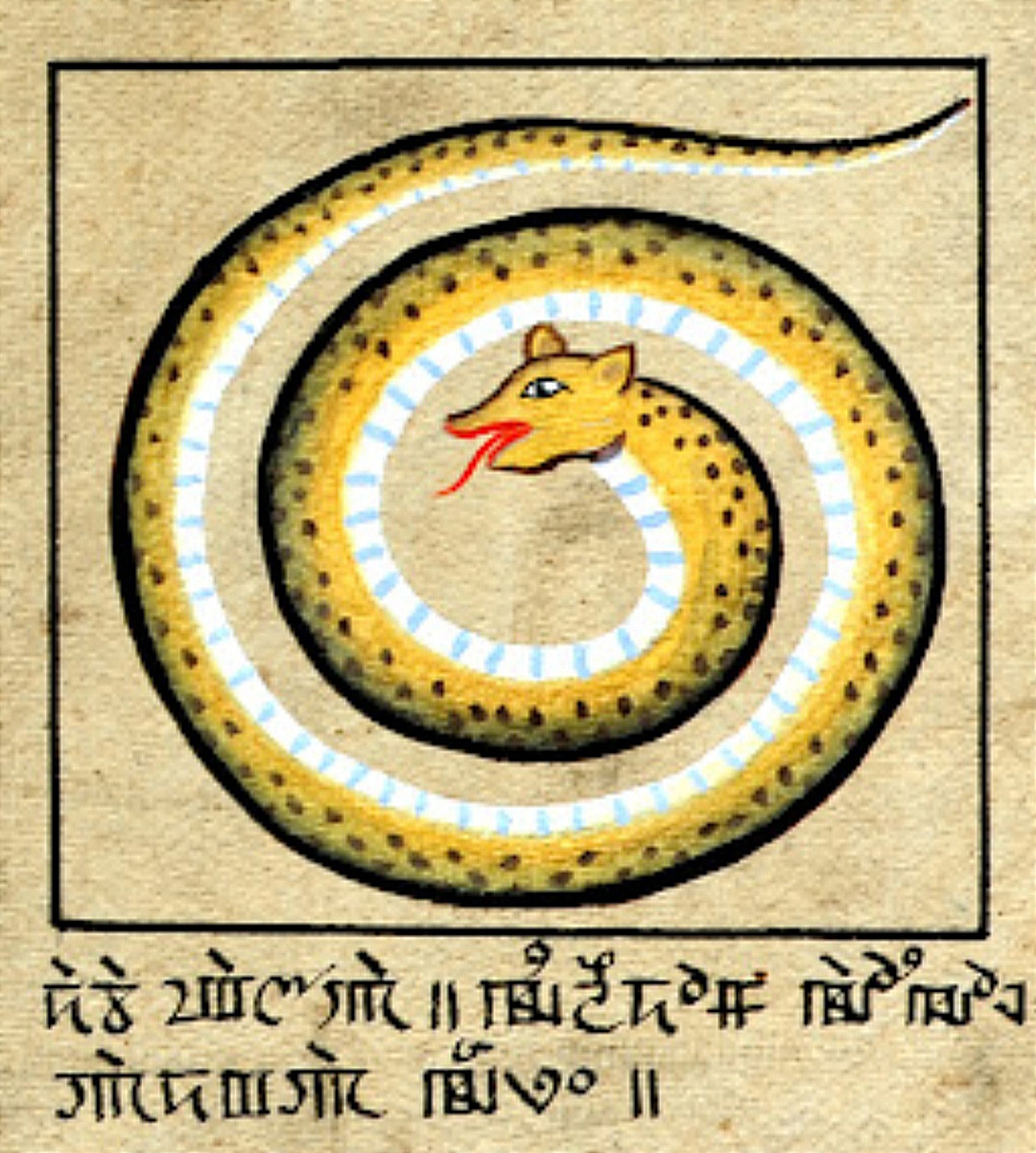
- A Classical Meitei illuminated manuscript painting, depicting a “Paphal” of the Kha-Nganpa totem of Pakhangba, a Meitei dragon, from the “Pakhangba Lambuba”, an Ancient Meitei language text, engraved in traditional Meetei Mayek script

Profile
- Country: India
- Region: Greater Imphal area including Kanglei Imphal Kangla as capital and lastly at Wangjing, Sangai Yumpham, Manipur
- District: Imphal East, Imphal West and Thoubal
- Ethnicity: Meitei people

Chief
- Kha-Nganba Iputhou
- Last Chief: Khaba Nongjenba, the last Meetei Imphal Kangla ruler of the Khaba dynasty
Clan branches
#Number of families
Allied clans
Chenglei (Sarang Leisangthem)
Titles
Khaba

Kha Nganpa (shortened from Khapa Nganpa) or Kha Nganba (shortened from Khaba Nganba) is a people group, which is recognized as one of the seven Yek Salai clans of the composite Meitei confederacy.

In the flag of Kangleipak, the bluish color represents the Kha-Nganpa group of Meitei people.

== Number of families ==
Meitei sub-groups	Romanisation	Number of families/surnames (according to N. Monihar)	Number of families/surnames (according to Khomdon Lisam)	Number of families/surnames (according to T.C. Hodson)	Number of families/surnames (according to Manipur Mirror)	Number of families/surnames (according to MASTEC)
ꯈꯥ ꯉꯥꯟꯄ	Kha Nganpa	42	37	17	43	21

== See also ==
- Mangang
- Luwang
- Khuman
- Angom
- Moilang
- Salai Leishangthem
- Khaba-Nganba
