= Numitsana Khomadon =

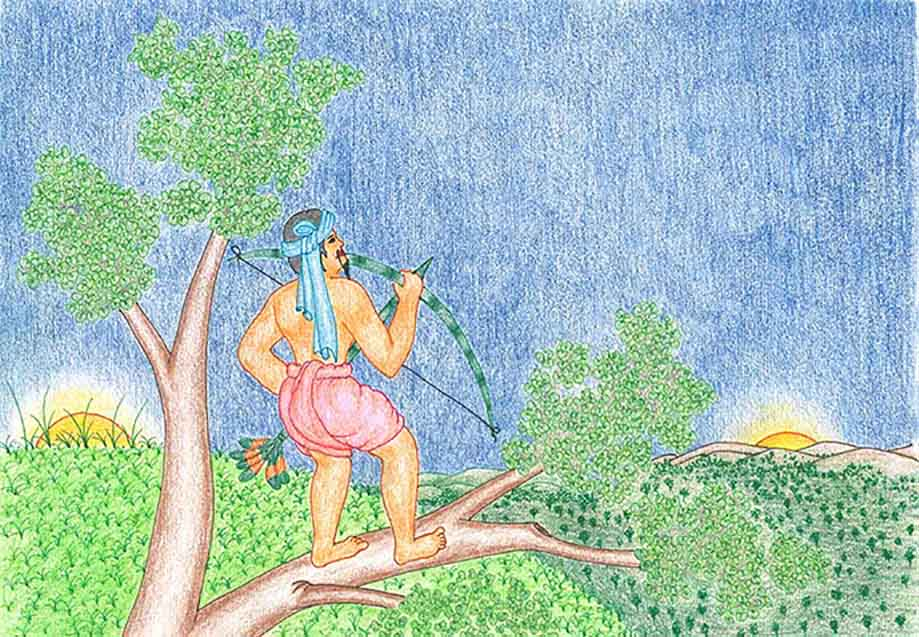
Numitsana Khomadon was one of the two solar brothers simultaneously shining in the sky.

Numitsana Khomadon (ꯅꯨꯃꯤꯠꯁꯅꯥ ꯈꯣꯃꯗꯣꯟ), (Note: with variations in Meitei language terminology as Numitsana Khommadon (ꯅꯨꯃꯤꯠꯁꯅꯥ ꯈꯣꯝꯃꯗꯣꯟ), or Numitsana Khomdon (ꯅꯨꯃꯤꯠꯁꯅꯥ ꯈꯣꯝꯗꯣꯟ).) also known poetically as Sana Khomadon (ꯁꯅꯥ ꯈꯣꯃꯗꯣꯟ) (Note: with variations in Meitei language as Sana Khomdon (ꯁꯅꯥ ꯈꯣꯝꯗꯣꯟ) or Sana Khommadon (ꯁꯅꯥ ꯈꯣꯝꯃꯗꯣꯟ).) or Nongpok Touring Leimacha (ꯅꯣꯡꯄꯣꯛ ꯇꯧꯔꯤꯡ ꯂꯩꯃꯆꯥ), was the younger of the two suns, who once simultaneously illuminated the world, in Meitei mythology, folklore and religion. He is mentioned in the 1st century CE classical Meitei literary work Numit Kappa ("The Shooting Down of the Sun"). His retreat and eventual return mark the emotional and symbolic climax of the narrative epic, showing the restoration of cosmic order and the triumph of compassion and renewal over fear and destruction. In Meitei culture, the return of one sun as a singular, life-giving force is celebrated symbolically. His story continues to be recited and referenced in ritual performances, folklore, traditional solar symbolism in Meitei cosmology.

== Names and epithets ==
Numitsana Khomadon can be roughly translated as “younger sun” in context, showing his status relative to his elder brother. In "Sana Khomadon", “Sana” (literally meaning golden) is a poetic term, used to denote his radiance and value. His another name, Nongpok Touring Leimacha, shows direction (eastern origin), travel, and celestial movement, denoting his mythic role in the sky’s east. These titles show the poetic vastness of ancient Meitei literary traditions, where celestial bodies are addressed not only as physical phenomena but as sentient, emotional beings.

== Solar brotherhood ==
The ancient Meitei world was illuminated by the younger sun Numitsana Khomadon and his elder brother, Tauhuireng Ahanpa. Both solar brothers were served tirelessly by a human servant, Khwai Nongchengpam Piba, who became so overwhelmed by the demands of constant day that he decided to destroy both suns to restore balance.

The elder sun, Tauhuireng Ahanpa, was wounded by an arrow and hid in agony to Khunbirok. Seeing this, Numitsana Khomadon became terrified and hid as well, causing complete darkness to fall upon the world.

== Retreat and refusal to return ==
His absence leads to suffering among all living beings. The people, unable to work or sustain their livelihoods, fall into despair. When the royal emissaries fail to persuade the suns to return, a group of noblewomen seek the help of the high priestess Chakpa Lamlang Amaipi.

Using divine power and a melodic invocation, the priestess reaches out to the hidden sun. However, Numitsana Khomadon refuses to return, voicing his grief and fear. He laments the tragic fate of his family, especially about his mother, Korou Nongmai Hanpi, losing several sons, one was stillborn, another unhatched, a third drowned in a trap as a child, and finally his elder brother, Tauhuireng Ahanpa, lying wounded, and his horse was fatally injured. The fear of human cruelty and the trauma of the assault make him unwilling to face the world again. His heartfelt response shows the human nature of the cosmic figure, showing his emotional depth rarely found in solar mythologies.

== Return and restoration ==
Eventually, moved by the priestess’s sincere pleas and the suffering of humankind, Numitsana Khomadon came out of hiding. His return is marked by a grand ritual involving a ceremonial bath in sacred water from the holy Kangla, infused with medicinal herbs. It was accompanied with ancient Meitei ritual songs from both Ningthouja and Moirang traditions. It was also accompanied with the crowing of a cock (rooster) (Note: In traditional Meitei religion, cock (rooster) represents God Pakhangba in certain cases.) and the spreading of daylight across the land.

With his reappearance, the world regains warmth, light, and order. Birds take flight, farmers resume work, and evil spirits vanish. He is recognised as the new sun, a singular light that alone governs the sky, balancing the natural order once disturbed by two suns.

== Symbolism ==
Numitsana Khomadon represents hope and renewal after devastation, as well as the gentler force of leadership, in contrast to his more powerful elder brother. His character also symbolises cosmic return to equilibrium, replacing the earlier, unsustainable excess. His reluctance and vulnerability add layers of realism and humanity to the epic, showing that even divine or celestial figures feel fear, loss, and reluctance. His return is not a conquest, but an act of healing and compassion.

== See also ==
- Ancient Meitei hymns
- Traditional Meitei drama
- Poireiton Khunthok
  - Poireiton
- Nongkhong Koiba
- Lainingthou Sanamahi
  - Sanamahi Laihui
  - Awang Phatlou Laimakhomba
  - Taibang Khaiba
- Pakhangba
- Nongshaba
  - Kanglasha
- Khuman royal necklace incident
  - Haoramhal, Haoramyaima, Haoramton
- Amaterasu and Susanoo
