= Khwai Nongchengpam Piba =

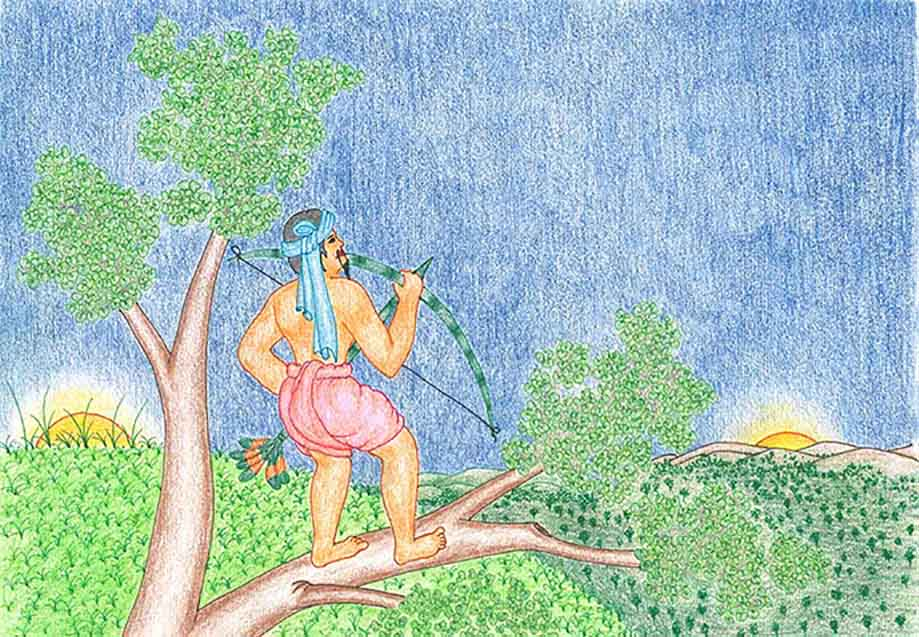
Khwai Nongchengpam Piba planning to bring down one of the two solar brothers, simultaneously shining in the sky

Khwai Nongchengpam Piba (ꯈ꯭ꯋꯥꯏ ꯅꯣꯡꯆꯦꯡꯄꯝ ꯄꯤꯕꯥ), (Note: sometimes shortened as Khwai Nongcheng Piba, with alternative spelling, Khwai Nongjeng Piba; Khwai Nungcheng Piba, or Khwai Nungjeng Piba) also known by his full name Khwai Nongchengpam Naicha Yekma Haotangla (ꯈ꯭ꯋꯥꯏ ꯅꯣꯡꯆꯦꯡꯄꯝ ꯅꯥꯏꯆꯥ ꯌꯦꯛꯃꯥ ꯍꯥꯎꯇꯪꯂꯥ), (Note: Nongchengpam is also spelled as Nongchengbam, or Nongjengbam, or shortened as Nongcheng, or Nongjeng, or Nungchengpam, or Nungchengbam, or Nungjengbam, or shortened as Nungcheng, or Nungjeng. Naicha is also spelled as Naija. Yekma is also spelled as Ekma. Haotangla is also spelled as Hautangla, Haotongla, or Hautongla.) is a slave, rebel, and archer, mentioned in the 1st century CE classical Meitei literary work Numit Kappa (“The Shooting Down of the Sun”). Portrayed as a devoted yet overburdened servant, he is remembered for the bold and symbolic act of shooting down the elder sun, Tauhuireng Ahanpa, which sets into motion the dramatic and allegorical events of the narrative epic. His character shows both personal rebellion and broader cosmic consequence. His actions ultimately lead to the purification and return of light (younger sun Numitsana Khomadon) through the efforts of priestess Chakpa Lamlang Amaipi, and nobles.

== Slavery ==
Khwai Nongchengpam Piba serves two solar brothers, Tauhuireng Ahanpa and Numitsana Khomadon, both representing aspects of the sun. His duties stretch across day and night, leaving him physically exhausted and emotionally distanced from his domestic life. Deprived of time to care for his wife and children or manage household affairs, he becomes increasingly resentful of his relentless labor. Unable to endure the burden, he decided to free himself by destroying his masters, the two suns. This act is considered as not just a personal rebellion, but a cosmic rupture, as it leads the world into darkness and brings a spiritual and communal crisis.

== Rebellion ==
=== Preparation and precision ===
Khwai Nongchengpam Piba’s decision is executed with well planned preparation and personal discipline. With help from his wife Haonu Chakhanu, who brings bamboo from her parental home, he makes a powerful bow and sharp arrows. Over seven days, he practices archery with extraordinary precision. He kills birds in flight. He splits his wife’s earring and a piece of arum root, placed on her head without harming her. Finally, he shoots through a taut thread. His actions show both his intense focus and his silent determination. Notably, he abstains from intimacy (from having sex with his wife) and unnecessary talking with her, during this time, keeping his mission secret even from his wife.

=== Shooting of the Sun ===
On the seventh day, Khwai Nongchengpam Piba ambushes and wounds Tauhuireng Ahanpa, the elder solar brother, who retreats to a hidden place called Khunbirok. The sun’s horse is also wounded and collapses in pain. Fearing for his own life, the younger solar brother, Numitsana Khomadon, disappears into hiding, and the world is thrown into total darkness. This cosmic event causes immense suffering among the people, who can no longer perform their daily work or sustain life. The darkness is not merely physical but symbolic, showing disorder, fear, and despair.

== Moral and allegorical dimensions ==
While Khwai Nongchengpam Piba’s act may appear treasonous or violent, the narrative epic of the Numit Kappa treats him with complexity and nuance. His suffering is real, his rebellion calculated, and his target symbolic. Many scholars interpret his character as a representation of the oppressed individual striking against overwhelming authority or imbalance in the natural order. His story challenges divine or solar authority not through malice, but from a human yearning for rest, balance, and dignity. His moral ambiguity makes him one of the most human and relatable characters in ancient Meitei literature (early Manipuri literature).

== See also ==
- Ukai Kappa and Chingkhu Telheiba
- Ancient Meitei hymns
- Traditional Meitei drama
- Korou Nongmai Hanpi
- Poireiton Khunthok
  - Poireiton
- Nongkhong Koiba
- Lainingthou Sanamahi
  - Sanamahi Laihui
  - Awang Phatlou Laimakhomba
  - Taibang Khaiba
- Pakhangba
- Nongshaba
  - Kanglasha
- Khuman royal necklace incident
  - Haoramhal, Haoramyaima, Haoramton
- Hou Yi
- Amaterasu, Tsukuyomi and Susanoo
