= Tauhuireng Ahanpa =

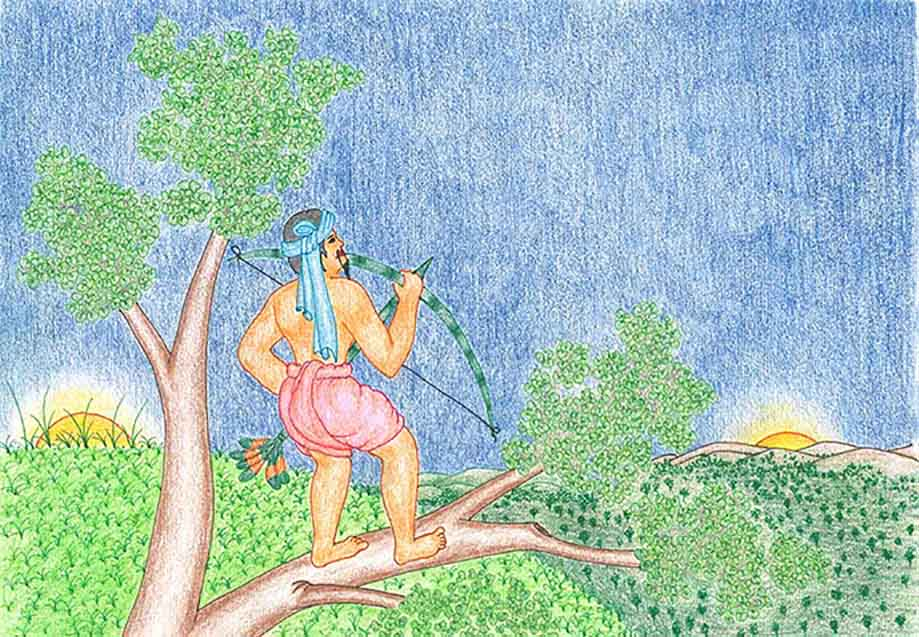
Tauhuireng Ahanpa was one of the two solar brothers simultaneously shining in the sky.

Tauhuireng Ahanpa (ꯇꯥꯎꯍꯨꯏꯔꯦꯡ ꯑꯍꯥꯟꯄ), (Note: with variations in Meitei language spellings as Taohuireng Ahanpa (ꯇꯥꯑꯣꯍꯨꯏꯔꯦꯡ ꯑꯍꯥꯟꯄꯥ).) also spelled Taihuiren Ahanpa (ꯇꯥꯎꯍꯨꯏꯔꯦꯟ ꯑꯍꯥꯟꯄ), (Note: with variations in Meitei language spellings as Taohuiren Ahanpa (ꯇꯥꯑꯣꯍꯨꯏꯔꯦꯟ ꯑꯍꯥꯟꯄꯥ).) was the elder of two solar brothers, who once simultaneously illuminated the world in Meitei mythology, folklore and religion. He is mentioned in the 1st century CE classical Meitei literary work Numit Kappa (“The Shooting Down of the Sun”). As the elder sun, Tauhuireng Ahanpa represents brightness, constancy, and cosmic authority. His dramatic downfall sets off the central crisis in the narrative epic and introduces allegorical and symbolic layers to the story. He is the fourth son of Goddess Korou Nongmai Hanpi. He has four sibling brothers. His three elder brothers had unfortunate endings of their lives, for which his mother grieved, as narrated by his younger brother Numitsana Khomadon to priestess Chakpa Lamlang Amaipi later.

== Etymology ==
The word Tauhuireng or Taihuiren has ancient Meitei language roots referring to light, radiance, or the direction of dawn. Ahanpa means first, elder, or primary, showing him as the senior celestial figure. His name is preserved in both classical literature and oral retellings, sometimes used metaphorically to denote the first-born, the original force, or an outshone legacy.

== Solar brotherhood ==
Tauhuireng Ahanpa is one of two suns who rule the skies. He is an elder brother of the younger sun named Numitsana Khomadon, also known as Sana Khomadon or Nongpok Touring Leimacha in poetic allusion. He is served by Khwai Nongchengpam Piba, a loyal but overburdened servant who attends to both the solar brothers during the day and night. Due to the unending labor and lack of rest, Khwai Nongchengpam Piba becomes exhausted and resentful. To end his suffering, he decides to eliminate the suns.

On the seventh day of preparation, the servant successfully ambushes Tauhuireng Ahanpa. He shoots him with a carefully crafted arrow, striking him in the liver. Tauhuireng Ahanpa bleeds profusely and collapses, retreating to a secret location known as Khunbirok. His horse, too, is mortally wounded and falls groaning to the ground. With the elder sun brother in hiding and the younger sun Sana Khomadon in fear, the world is plunged into total darkness.

== Symbolism ==
Tauhuireng Ahanpa functions as more than a mythological character. He symbolizes overpowering authority or a natural imbalance (two suns instead of one), as well as the burden of excess, which creates hardship for humans and imbalance in nature. His character also symbolises leadership without pause, whose constant presence becomes unsustainable. His fall shows an allegory of political overthrow or natural correction. The rebellion by a lowly servant against such cosmic figures shows a deeper human longing for balance, relief, and autonomy. His disappearance and the resulting darkness cause widespread suffering, showing the interdependence of power and responsibility.

== See also ==
- Ancient Meitei hymns
- Traditional Meitei drama
- Poireiton Khunthok
  - Poireiton
- Nongkhong Koiba
- Lainingthou Sanamahi
  - Sanamahi Laihui
  - Awang Phatlou Laimakhomba
  - Taibang Khaiba
- Pakhangba
- Nongshaba
  - Kanglasha
- Khuman royal necklace incident
  - Haoramhal, Haoramyaima, Haoramton
- Amaterasu, Tsukuyomi and Susanoo
