= Chakpa Lamlang Amaipi =

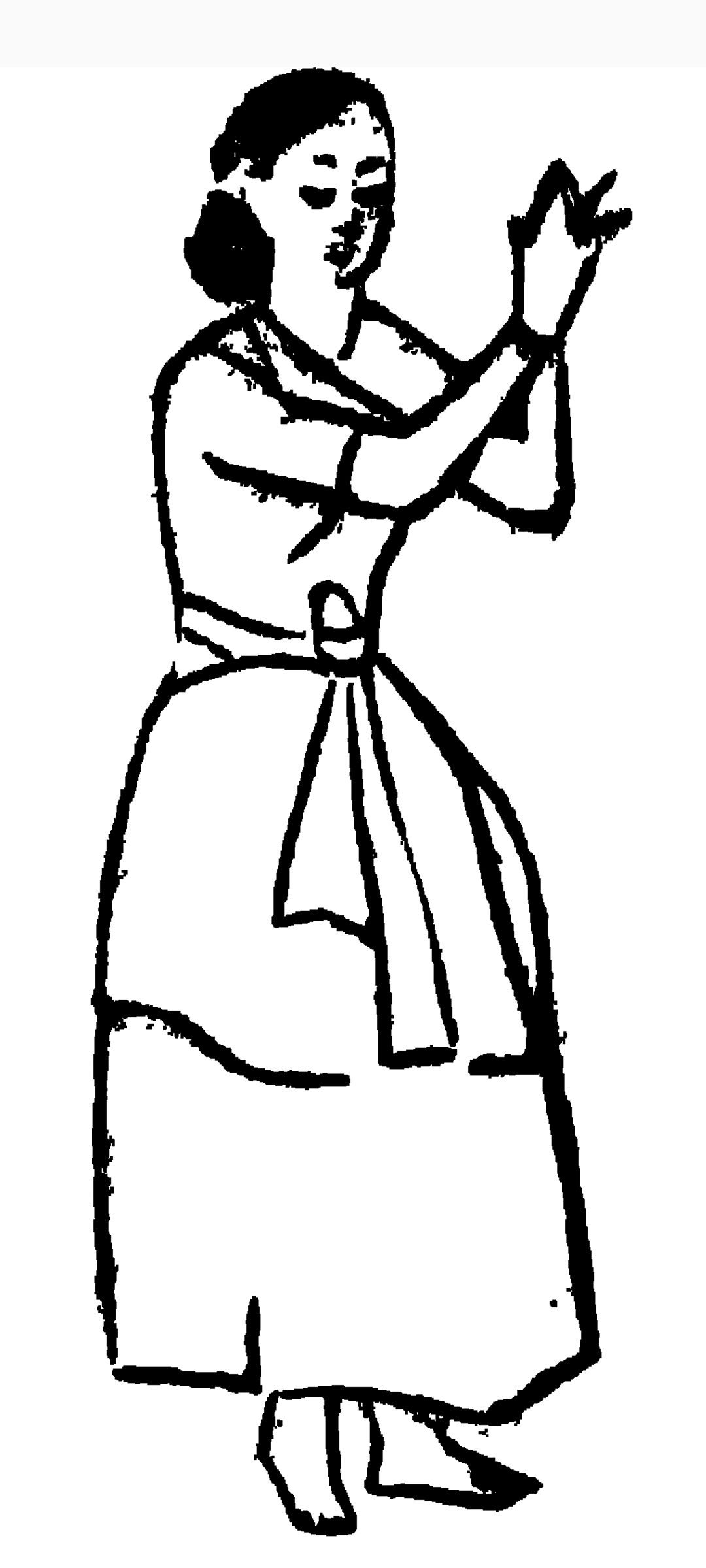
Chakpa Lamlang Amaipi is an Amaipi (Amaibi) mentioned in ancient Meitei literature.

Chakpa Lamlang Amaipi (ꯆꯛꯄꯥ ꯂꯝꯂꯥꯡ ꯑꯃꯥꯏꯄꯤ), also known as Chakpa Lamlang Amaibi (ꯆꯛꯄ ꯂꯥꯝꯂꯡ ꯑꯃꯥꯏꯕꯤ), is a priestess (Amaibi) mentioned in the 1st century CE classical Meitei literary work Numit Kappa ("The Shooting Down of the Sun"). Portrayed as a high priestess of immense wisdom and divine authority, she plays an important role in restoring light to a darkened world by requesting the hiding sun Numitsana Khomadon to return to his former place. Her intervention shows the spiritual leadership of priestesses in early Meitei society.

== Etymology and identity ==
Chakpa refers to an ethnocultural subgroup of Meitei people in ancient Kangleipak (early Manipur), known for their ritual and priestly functions. Lamlang indicates her geographic or communal origin. Amaipi (or Amaibi) is a traditional Meitei term for a priestess, particularly one trained in ritual, trance, or sacred communication. Her full name, Chakpa Lamlang Amaipi, identifies her as the priestess of the Chakpa community from Lamlang. She is a spiritual woman having the ability to connect the human world with the cosmic realms.

== Background ==
In the Numit Kappa, the world is plunged into total darkness after the elder sun Tauhuireng Ahanpa is shot by Khwai Nongchengpam Piba and retreats, and the younger sun Numitsana Khomadon hides in fear. As suffering spreads across the land, the royal nobles attempt in vain to restore cosmic balance. Eventually, the ten noblemen, seeing no success through political or ritual means, turn to Chakpa Lamlang Amaipi. She is described as a high priestess of divine insight and sacred power, associated with the ancient Chakpa priestly tradition of ancient Kangleipak.

== Spiritual invocation and cosmic mediation ==
Using her spiritual abilities, Chakpa Lamlang Amaipi locates the hiding sun, Numitsana Khomadon. In a melodious and emotionally powerful chanting, she requests to his conscience and compassion by narrating the immense suffering endured by the people, like farmers cannot work in the fields, children cry in fear, animals wander in confusion, and all creation is suspended in gloom. Her appeal is not demanding or authoritative, but intimate and sincere. This maternal tone of invocation deeply affects Numitsana Khomadon, who, though initially hesitant, is moved by her compassion and wisdom. Her spiritual performance successfully influences in the younger sun Numitsana Khomadon’s decision to return, starting a restorative ritual that brings light and order back to the world.

Unlike kings, ministers, or warriors, she, despite being a priestess, succeeds through empathy, ritual purity, and eloquence. Her success shows the high status of the Amaibi (female priestess or shaman) in ancient Meitei civilization.

== Legacy ==
Although the Numit Kappa is mythic in nature, Chakpa Lamlang Amaipi’s role shows real traditions in ancient Meitei civilisation's religious practice, where female spiritual leaders held influential roles in leading rituals and seasonal festivals, performing trance or possession ceremonies, appealing to deities, ancestral spirits, and cosmic forces. Her portrayal in the Numit Kappa shows the historical importance of the Amaibi tradition, which predates the formalization of Hinduism in Manipur and remains alive in Sanamahism, the indigenous Meitei religion.

== See also ==
- Women in Meitei civilisation
- Korou Nongmai Hanpi
- Haonu Chakhanu
- Ancient Meitei hymns
- Meitei ritual songs
- Traditional Meitei drama
- Lai Haraoba
- Umang Lai
