= Haonu Chakhanu =

Haonu Chakhanu (ꯍꯥꯎꯅꯨ ꯆꯥꯈꯥꯅꯨ), also known as Haonu Chakha Saphabi (ꯍꯥꯎꯅꯨ ꯆꯥꯈꯥ ꯁꯥꯐꯕꯤ), is an ancient Meitei woman mentioned in the 1st century CE classical Meitei literary work Numit Kappa (The Shooting Down of the Sun). She is married to Khwai Nongchengpam Piba, the slave who rebelled against his two masters, with the action of shooting down the elder sun, Tauhuireng Ahanpa. She plays an important supporting role, helping her husband, that shows her emotional and domestic dimensions, as well as the quiet strength of women in early Meitei cultural narratives.

== Overview ==
Haonu Chakhanu is a dutiful wife and silent collaborator in her husband’s bold and dangerous plan to shoot down the sun. Her contribution to the plot is indirect yet essential as she obeys her husband’s request to fetch strong, resilient bamboo from her natal home, which he uses to craft the bow and arrows for his mission. She was not a quite domestic partner but also as a quiet enabler of a world-changing event.

== Character and traits ==
Haonu Chakhanu is known for her obedience, loyalty, and emotional restraint. During the week-long preparation for the attack, her husband strictly instructs her to remain indoors, to focus on her weaving, to avoid chatting with neighbors or drawing attention to their household. She agreed to her husband's instructions without any question, showing discipline and discretion. Importantly, despite the importance of her husband’s plan, she is not informed by her husband about the details. Her husband, keeps the mission a secret, showing both the Meitei cultural norms of silence and distance in critical matters, as well as her husband's solitary burden.

== Involvement ==
Haonu Chakhanu participates in her husband’s archery training, serving as a passive target to test his precision. He shoots an arrow to split her earring as she walks uphill with a water pitcher. He strikes a piece of arum root, placed on her head without harming her. He cuts a tightly stretched thread she holds, self testing his skill.

== See also ==
- Women in Meitei civilisation
- Chakpa Lamlang Amaipi
- Sunulembi
- Ngangkha Leima
- Tauhuireng Ahanpa
- Numitsana Khomadon
- Korou Nongmai Hanpi
