= Serpents of Pakhangba =

Indian music band

Serpents of Pakhangba (ꯁꯔꯄꯦꯟꯠ꯭ꯁ ꯑꯣꯐ ꯄꯥꯈꯪꯕ) is an avant-garde, experimental, and folk metal band from Mumbai, India. It was founded by multi-instrumentalist and producer Vishal J. Singh, who is also known for his work with the band Amogh Symphony. The group combines heavy metal with shamanic, folk, and jazz influences, drawing inspiration from Meitei mythology and the shape-shifting deity Pakhangba.

== Formation and early years ==
Serpents of Pakhangba was formed in Mumbai by Vishal J. Singh and bass player Manas Chowdhary, who also plays the didgeridoo. The early lineup included Fidel Dely Murillo, a percussionist and drummer from Panama, Dhruv Mody on sitar, and vocalist Madhura Risley.

The band released its first self-titled EP in early 2019. Later that year, both Mody and Risley left the band due to other commitments. Their debut sound was described by Singh as "more accessible" than his other project, Amogh Symphony, though still experimental.

== Line-up changes and live debut ==
After Mody and Risley left, the band welcomed Aruna Jade, a vocalist formerly of the vocal group Aflatunes. She joined after an audition process where she demonstrated diverse vocal styles, including metal growls and Mongolian throat singing.

The band's 2019 single "Headhunters" featured complex arrangements and theatrical vocals. Although Serpents of Pakhangba faced challenges in finding venues due to their unconventional sound, they made their live debut on 2 February 2020 at the Control ALT Delete Festival in Mumbai. The set included songs from their EP and unreleased tracks like "Vultures" and "The Forest Belongs to the Maibi". Singh described the performance as "controlled and uncontrolled chaos".

== Musical themes and style ==
The band's music blends avant-garde metal, folk, jazz, and experimental rock. Serpents of Pakhangba's work often includes theatrical elements, storytelling, and folk traditions from Northeast India, especially from Meitei culture.

Their songs deal with themes such as war, tribal practices, spirituality, human greed, and mythology. The music is often multilingual, using Manipuri, Goalparia, Japanese, and English lyrics.

Singh describes their approach as "genre-shapeshifting", a reflection of the band's namesake — Pakhangba, a divine, shape-shifting serpent in Meitei mythology.

=== "Panthoibi" and folk influence ===
In 2021, the band released the single "Panthoibi", inspired by the Meitei goddess of power, war, and peace. The song and its music video, directed by Kulanandini Mahanta, feature the band members dressed in Meitei traditional attire.

The lyrics explore the subject of child abuse while connecting it with the story of the goddess Panthoibi, who represents beauty, wisdom, and protection. The band explained that the goddess "exists in every woman's strength and wisdom".

The single was produced by No Binary Records. The verses paraphrase Panthoibi Mingkheilol, an old Manipuri text that praises the goddess's glory and power.

=== Debut album: Serpents of Pakhangba ===
The debut full-length album continued the band's exploration of experimental soundscapes. The group used instruments like the didgeridoo, tongue drum, violin, and Pena, blending noise rock, neo-folk, and avant-prog styles.

Tracks such as Invocation, Headhunters, and I.M.A mix aggressive rhythms with meditative passages. The album includes both metalcore-like intensity and folk-inspired melodies, creating vivid auditory imagery.

Songs like "Mountain Spirits" and "The Forest Belongs to the Maibi" express mystical and spiritual experiences rooted in Meitei tradition. The Maibis are women who dedicate their lives to divine worship, and the track reflects this devotion.

==== Concept ====
The music's duality of masculine and feminine energy is expressed through the mix of metal's aggression and folk's spirituality. Singh draws influence from his Assamese, Punjabi, and Manipuri heritage and his family's handwritten texts on Meitei shamanic traditions.

=== Second album: Air and Fire ===
In 2025, Serpents of Pakhangba released their second studio album, Air and Fire, described as a concept album of 13 tracks. The album tells the story of an endangered shamanic tribe attacked by a corrupt political force.

It combines heavy metal, folk instruments, spoken word, and multiple languages. The work includes Japanese, Manipuri, Goalparia, and English lyrics, with sounds of nature, bells, and throat singing to build atmosphere.

The album features guest artists such as Pratika Prabhune, Mallika Sundaramurthy, Ambar Das, Arghadeep Barua, Victoria Villarreal, and Chaoba Thiyam. The latter contributed the Pena, a key Meitei instrument, while Nate Miller played the Erhu, a Chinese string instrument.

Tracks like Carnivorous, North of Koubru, Forest Hymn, and A Wounded Leader's Last Stand show the band's range — from death-metal intensity to spiritual chanting. Singh described Air and Fire as an exploration of "love, hope, and rebellion" through avant-garde art.

== Performance and aesthetic ==
The band is known for its visual and theatrical live shows, where members wear traditional cultural costumes and face paint. Performances often include ritual-like movements and spiritual elements.

Serpents of Pakhangba's concerts attract diverse audiences, including metal fans, spiritual practitioners, artists, and scientists. Their merchandise, such as handmade incense, reflects the group's shamanic philosophy.

== Philosophy ==
For Vishal Singh, avant-garde is not only a musical style but also a way of thinking. He believes in blending traditional and modern elements to challenge artistic boundaries.

The band members practice disciplines like Tai Chi, Qigong, and sound therapy, integrating spirituality with performance. Singh, who also works as an oracle and astrologer, views music as a tool for healing and self-discovery.

== Members ==
Current lineup

- Vishal J. Singh – vocals, guitars, dotara, composer, producer
- Hinoki – vocals
- Skymoon – vocals, synth, turntables
- Tamara Mayela Kazziha – violin, vocals
- Varun Sood – drums, percussion

Former members

- Madhura Risley – vocals
- Dhruv Mody – sitar
- Aruna Jade – vocals
- Manas Chowdhary – bass, didgeridoo
- Fidel Dely Murillo – drums, percussion

== Discography ==
Extended play

- Serpents of Pakhangba (2019)

Albums

- Serpents of Pakhangba (debut album)
- Air and Fire (2025)

Singles

- Headhunters (2019)
- Panthoibi (2021)

== See also ==
- Ancient Meitei hymns
- Meitei ritual songs
- Modern Meitei theatre
- Traditional Meitei theatre
