= Korou Nongmai Hanpi =

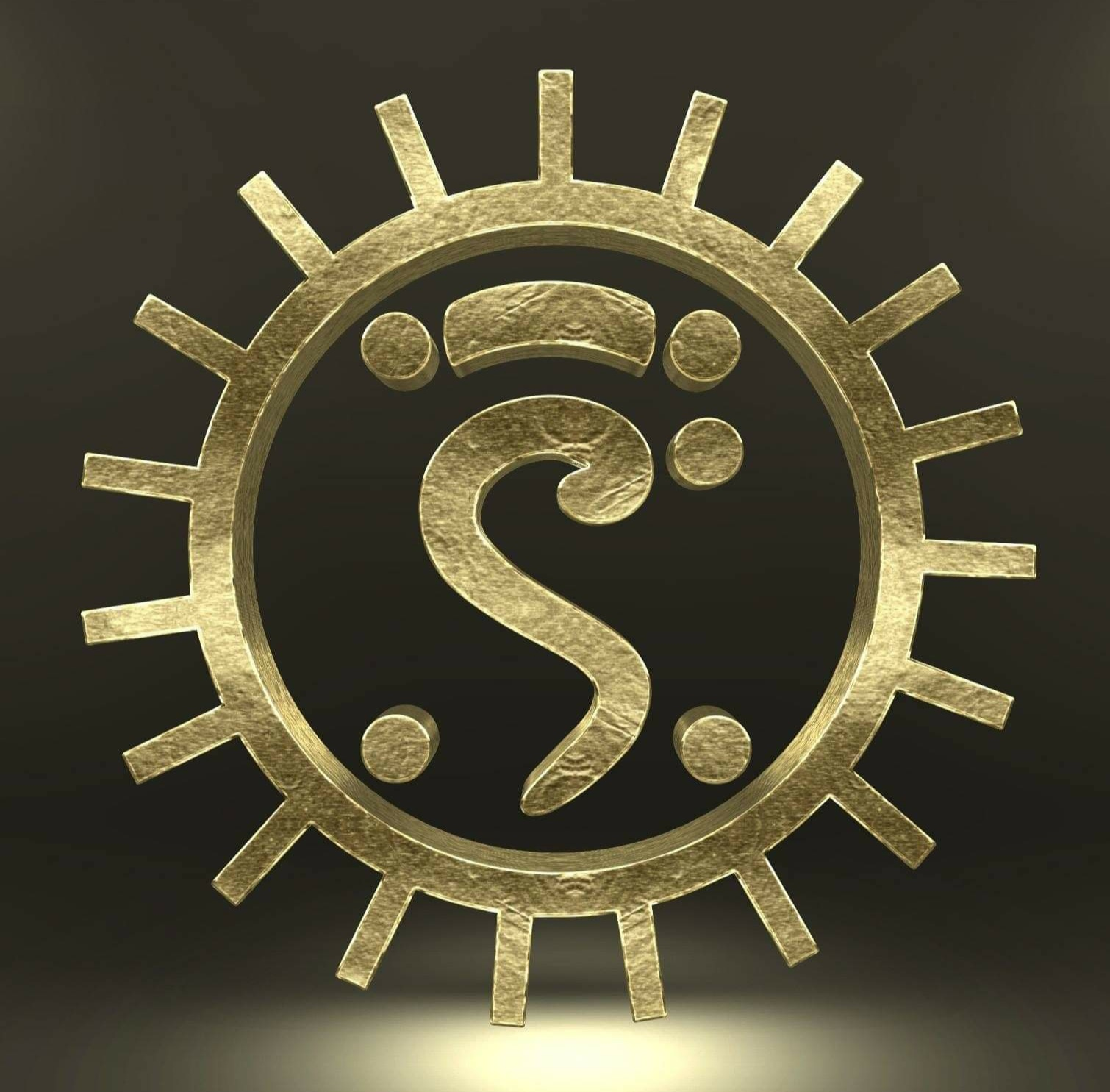
Korou Nongmai Hanpi is a goddess of maternal stature in traditional Meitei religion of Sanamahism.

Korou Nongmai Hanpi (ꯀꯣꯔꯧ ꯅꯣꯡꯃꯥꯏ ꯍꯥꯟꯄꯤ), also known as Korou Nongmai Hanbi (ꯀꯣꯔꯧ ꯅꯣꯡꯃꯥꯏ ꯍꯥꯟꯕꯤ), is a goddess of maternal stature in Meitei mythology, folklore and religion. She is notably mentioned in the 1st century CE classical Meitei literary work Numit Kappa ("The Shooting Down of the Sun"). She is the mother of the two suns, Tauhuireng Ahanpa (the elder sun) and Numitsana Khomadon (the younger sun), whose presence and eventual separation from the sky serve as the central events of the narrative epic. Korou Nongmai Hanpi plays a symbolic and emotional role in Meitei cosmology.

Her story shows a maternal thread into the traditionally male-dominated world of solar and cosmic myth. She is part of a lineage of divine or semi-divine mothers in ancient Meitei literature who bear powerful children at great personal cost.

== Name and etymology ==
Korou refers to the sky or the upper world in Meitei cosmology. Nongmai (literally "sky-facing" or "rain-facing") connects her to weather and sky elements, showing her with celestial motherhood. Hanpi is a feminine honorific or descriptive suffix often used in poetic or divine naming to show reverence or elevation. Together, Korou Nongmai Hanpi is interpreted as a celestial or sky-bound maternal being, associated with divine maternity and the cycles of cosmic loss and renewal.

== Family ==
In the classical text of the Numit Kappa, Korou Nongmai Hanpi is referenced by her younger son, Numitsana Khomadon, during his emotional response to the plea of the priestess Chakpa Lamlang Amaipi, to return to the sky and bring light to the darkened world. Her younger sun recounts his deep grief and fear, much of which is tied to the suffering experienced by his mother.

According to her son's lament, Korou Nongmai Hanpi first bore a son who was stillborn. Her second child, was described as an egg, that was never hatched. Her third son, known as Sana Khommaton Numit Kaite Ngampa, was described as drowned as a young boy in a fishing trap. His body transformed into natural symbols, his hair into wild grass flowers and his teeth into bright cowries. Her fourth and fifth sons were the two suns, Tauhuireng Ahanpa, who was wounded by a slave named Khwai Nongcheng Piba and thus, remained hidden, and Numitsana Khomadon, the youngest and the narrator of the tragedy to the priestess.

The sequence of tragic losses of children of Korou Nongmai Hanpi contributes to her younger sun’s reluctance to return, as he cannot bear to inflict further sorrow upon his mother or revisit a world where so much pain has occurred.

== Symbolism ==
Korou Nongmai Hanpi symbolizes maternal grief and endurance, as Her repeated losses show the universal theme of a mother’s suffering in the face of fate. Her character also symbolises the cosmic womb. As the mother of celestial beings, she represents the source of life, light, and movement in the sky. She represents emotional memory as Her mention serves to root the myth not just in cosmology but in deep human emotion, loss, memory, and fear of recurrence. She is portrayed as a deeply suffering mother, on a cosmic scale.

== See also ==
- Women in Meitei civilisation
- Leimarel Sidabi
- Panthoibi
  - Panthoibi Khonggul
- Namungbi
  - Panthoibi Naheron
- Imoinu
- Phouoibi
  - Phouoibi Warol
- Khuman royal necklace incident
  - Haoramhal, Haoramyaima, Haoramton
- Hijan Hirao
