= Ancient Meitei =

Ancient Meitei may refer to:

- A person belonging to Meitei ethnicity, who lived in ancient times
- Of or relating to Meitei culture in ancient times
- Ancient Meitei language, also known as Old Manipuri, the ancestor of Modern Meithei language
- Ancient Meitei literature, the body of the earliest known literary works in the language
  - Ancient Meitei hymns, sacred musical and poetic compositions in the language
- Ancient Meitei script, the writing system used for the language
