= List of epic poems in Meitei =

Manipuri language epics

Meitei (Manipuri language), a Tibeto-Burman language of Manipur, India, is an archive of numerous epic poetry as well as epic prose.

== Lists ==
Here is a list of the epics in Meitei literature:

Faith	Epic	Description
Sanamahism	Khamba Thoibi	The tale of an orphan hero and a princess.
Sanamahism	Numit Kappa	The tale of a hero who shoots one of the two Suns to create a night.
Sanamahism and Hinduism	Cheitharol Kumbaba	One of the longest chronological series of the Manipuri royalties.
Sanamahism	Konthoujam Nongarol	The tale of Sky God Soraren, who kidnapped the Konthou princess Tampha to be his consort.
Hinduism	Awa Ngamba	The heroic actions of Emperor Narasingh in his conquest of Awa kingdom.
Sanamahism	Khuman Kangleirol	The chronicle of Khuman rulers of a couple of millennium.
Vaisnavism	Samsok Ngamba	The heroic actions of the kingdom of Samsok by Emperor Pamheiba.
Sanamahism	Hijan-Hirao	The contributions of Luwang Ningthou Punshiba in the invention of the great dragon boat, from the giant Uningthou tree.
Vaisnavism	Takhel Ngamba	The heroic actions of Emperor Pamheiba in the conquest of the Tripura (Takhel) kingdom.
Sanamahism	Moirang Kangleirol	The chronicle of Moilang emperors about a couple of millennium.
Sanamahism	Khagi Ngamba	The heroic actions of Emperor Khagemba in the conquest of Khagi (China).
Sanamahism	Chainarol	The chivalry of heroes, who combat for the fame of masculinity.
Secular	Shingel Indu	A complete masterpiece of Hijam Anganghal, about the irony of a lady named Indu.
Sanamahism	Poireiton Khunthok	The establishment of the Khuman Kingdom by King Poireiton in Kangleipak.
Sanamahism	Naothingkhong Phambal Kaba	The tale of struggles of Prince Naothingkhong to ascend the Throne of Kangleipak.
Sanamahism	Numban Pombi Luwaoba	The tale of a hero who fights the God of death, to save his consort's life.
Secular	Jahera	The irony of a Muslim Lady named Jahera who can't fulfill her love with a Hindu man, due to social and religious barriers.
Vaisnavism	Khongjom Tirtha	The journey to Khongjom region, masterpiece of Nilabir Sharma
