= Hanglai Jagoi =

Puppet dancing theatre in Meitei civilization

- Native name: Hang-Lai Jagoi
- Etymology: Puppet dancing
- Genre: Jagoi
- Origin: Meitei culture

Hanglai Jagoi (Meitei for 'puppetry dancing') (Note: sometimes also referred to as Manipuri puppetry) is a Meitei traditional form of puppet theatre, originated from Manipur. It is regarded as one of the Meitei intangible cultural heritage.

== Origin ==
According to scholars, the exact timing of the origin of Hanglai Jagoi (Meitei: ꯍꯪꯂꯥꯏ ꯖꯒꯣꯏ) lies in uncertainty, but it is generally accepted that the art form emerged before the arrival of Hinduism in Manipur. The art form had significant developments during the reigns of Meitei kings Ching-Thang Khomba (Meitei for 'Rajarshi Bhagyachandra') and Chinglen Nongdrenkhomba (Meitei for 'Gambhir Singh'). In their eras, the art form was performed during the organizations of Manipuri Raas Leela (Meitei: ꯔꯥꯁ ꯖꯒꯣꯏ) and Ratha Yatra (Meitei: ꯀꯥꯡ ꯆꯤꯡꯕ ꯀꯨꯝꯍꯩ). Later, it came to be associated with the art form of Goura Leela (Meitei: ꯒꯧꯔꯥ ꯂꯤꯂꯥ ꯀꯨꯝꯍꯩ) too.

== Types ==
Hanglai Jagoi (Meitei: ꯍꯡꯂꯥꯏ ꯖꯒꯣꯏ) is of four types: (1) Rod puppetry, (2) Shadow puppetry, (3) Glove puppetry, and (4) String puppetry.

== Materials for puppets ==
The traditional Hanglai (Meitei for 'puppet') was made of wood, paper, ragged clothes, dried paddy, etc. Later, other materials were used as substitutes.

== Dying conditions ==
The art form of Hanglai Jagoi (Meitei: ꯍꯪꯂꯥꯏ ꯖꯒꯣꯏ) is in the state of dying, mainly because of the challenges it faces, including but not limited to acculturation, modernization, different socio-cultural factors as well as lack of supports, demands, patronage, etc. Artists are required to be financially safe independently, because all the needs of the art forms are usually born by themselves, due to lack of public supports.

Important factors for its downfall include technological advancements and reduction in public interests.

== Preservation ==
Gurumayum Basanta Sharma (Meitei: ꯒꯨꯔꯨꯃꯌꯨꯝ ꯕꯁꯟꯇ ꯁꯔꯃꯥ) of Thiyam Leishangkhong area in Imphal West district is preserving and promoting the art form of Hanglai Jagoi (Meitei: ꯍꯡꯂꯥꯏ ꯖꯒꯣꯏ) in Manipur and abroad. In recognition of his dedicated effort to preserve and promote the traditional Meitei puppetry, he was honoured by the Centre for Cultural Resources and Training (CCRT), Ministry of Culture (India), for the "Senior Fellowship for 2020-21", from July 1, 2023, for a 2-year period. He learned the art form from different teachers, including from his late father, Gurumayum Jadu Sharma (Meitei: ꯒꯨꯔꯨꯃꯌꯨꯝ ꯖꯥꯗꯨ ꯁꯔꯃꯥ), who was also once an artist of the very puppet theatre, in Manipur, since 1986, from the age of 14. During his father's time, the art form was performed for more than 20 times in a year, but in present-day times, it is performed only during certain festivals or particular events. He works with the "Moppet Decoration and Cultural Centre, Yumnam Huidrom Thiyam Leishangkhong", teaching the art form.

== See also ==
- Classicism in Meitei culture
- Animals in Meitei culture
- Plants in Meitei culture
- Women in Meitei culture
