= Kumdamsei =

Classical Meitei poem

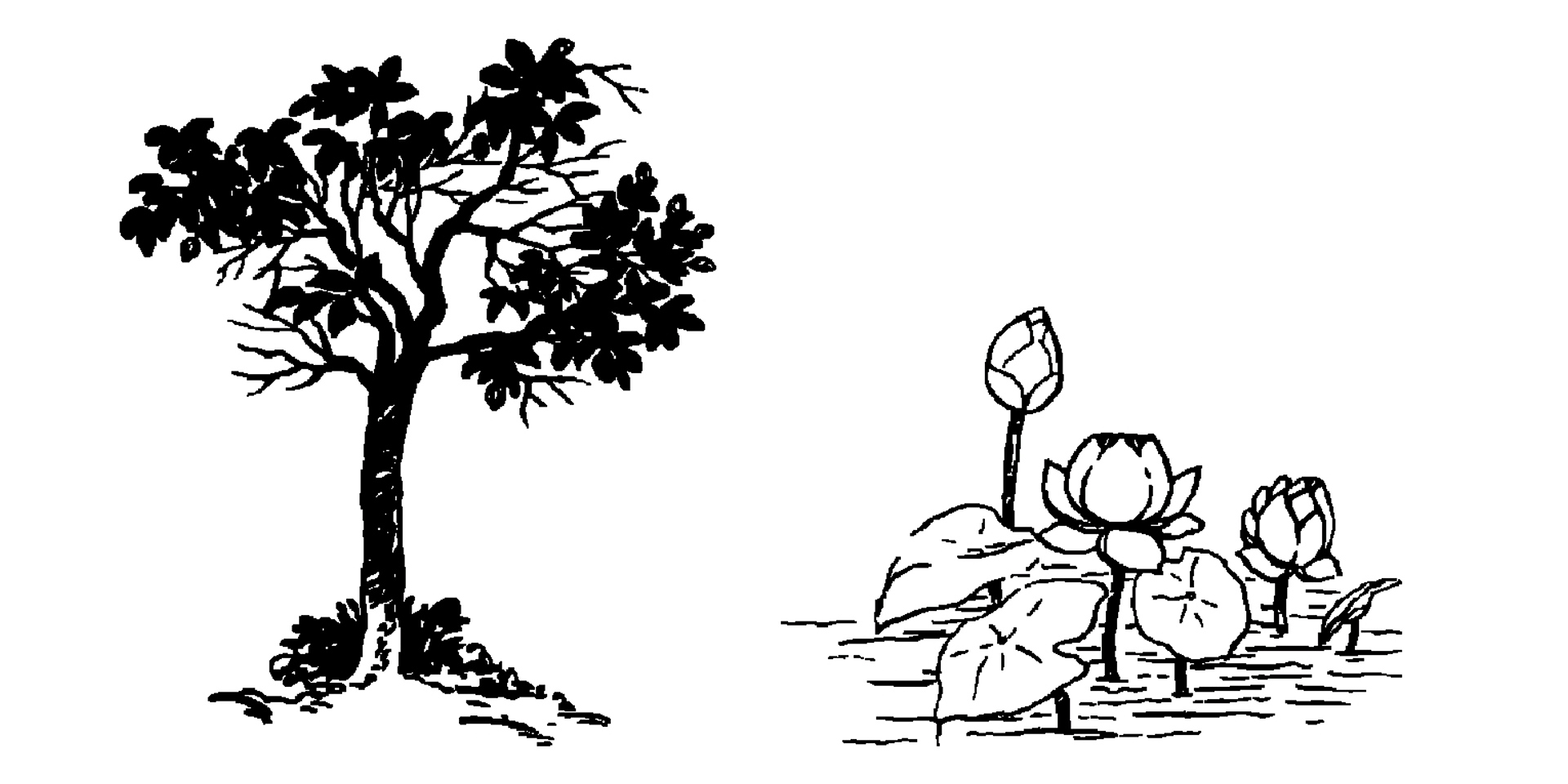
- Kumdamsei talks about the spring season (Meitei: Yenning-tha)
- Original title: ꯀꯨꯝꯗꯝꯁꯩ
- Translator: Nunglekpam Premi, RK Jhalajit, Moirangthem Kirti, Ayyappa, Ch. Manihar
- Country: India
- Language: Meitei language
- Subject: Meitei literature
- Genre: Meitei literature
- Lines: 485

Kumdamsei (Meitei: ꯀꯨꯝꯗꯝꯁꯩ) is an ancient Meitei language literary work. It talks about the changes in seasons like spring, rain, and sunshine. The poem uses simple words to describe these changes in nature.

== Etymology ==
The Meitei language word Kumdamsei is translated as "the song of the vernal rain" by numerous scholars, including Nunglekpam Premi, RK Jhalajit, and Moirangthem Kirti Singh.

Others translate it as "song of seasons". Ch. Manihar translates Kumdamsei as "the song that ushers in a new season."

== Notable lines ==
Kumdamsei contains around 485 lines.

=== Fruits and birds ===
One part of the poem, translated by Ayyappa (1997, p. 331), says:

Fruits are hanging, The birds flying in flocks have become mad.

This shows the abundance of fruit and the busy birds during the season. The poem also describes how flowers bloom on the earth's surface. The sunshine makes the rural landscape look beautiful. Rain is seen as a sign of new life. It brings a fresh, earthy smell.

=== Flowers and water ===
The poem also talks about flowers and water. It says,

"When the lotus blooms, and the lily blossoms, there's a fascination to see"

— translation by Ayyappa, 1997, p. 331

Flowers add beauty to nature. They decorate the world but do not last forever. The poem shows how the seasons change and connect with each other. It describes the cycle of nature clearly.

=== Beauty of the vernal rain ===
Kumdamsei or the song of the Vernal Rain describes the beauty of the vernal rain as follows:

"The week returneth again and again but the flower of life returneth not; the month too reneweth again But life reneweth not."

== Depictions ==
The poem has a musical rhythm. It is meant to be spoken aloud in oral traditions. The poem also talks about the relationship between humans and nature. It helps people feel refreshed and connected to the world around them. The spring season represents a new start. It shows that Earth is full of life again. The sun brings a new day and spreads light over the villages. This gives hope and inspires people to connect emotionally with the ancient Meitei way of life.

Seasonal changes show the natural order of the universe. The changing seasons are like the stages of a person’s life: from birth to adulthood, old age, and death. This reminds people that death is a natural part of life. The seasons also help people learn about celestial events. This helps make a calendar for farmers. The calendar tells them when to plant their crops. Without it, farming would be hard to manage.
