= Traditional Meitei theatre =

Ancient and medieval Meitei theatrical culture

Traditional Meitei drama in Manipur has its roots in religious and community Meitei festivals, especially the Lai Haraoba festival. Lai Haraoba is a sacred ritual that combines music, dance, and drama to tell the story of creation and human birth according to Meitei mythology and Meitei folklore of Ancient Kangleipak. It is performed with rhythmic movements and emotional expression. Men, women, and children all take part in this performance.

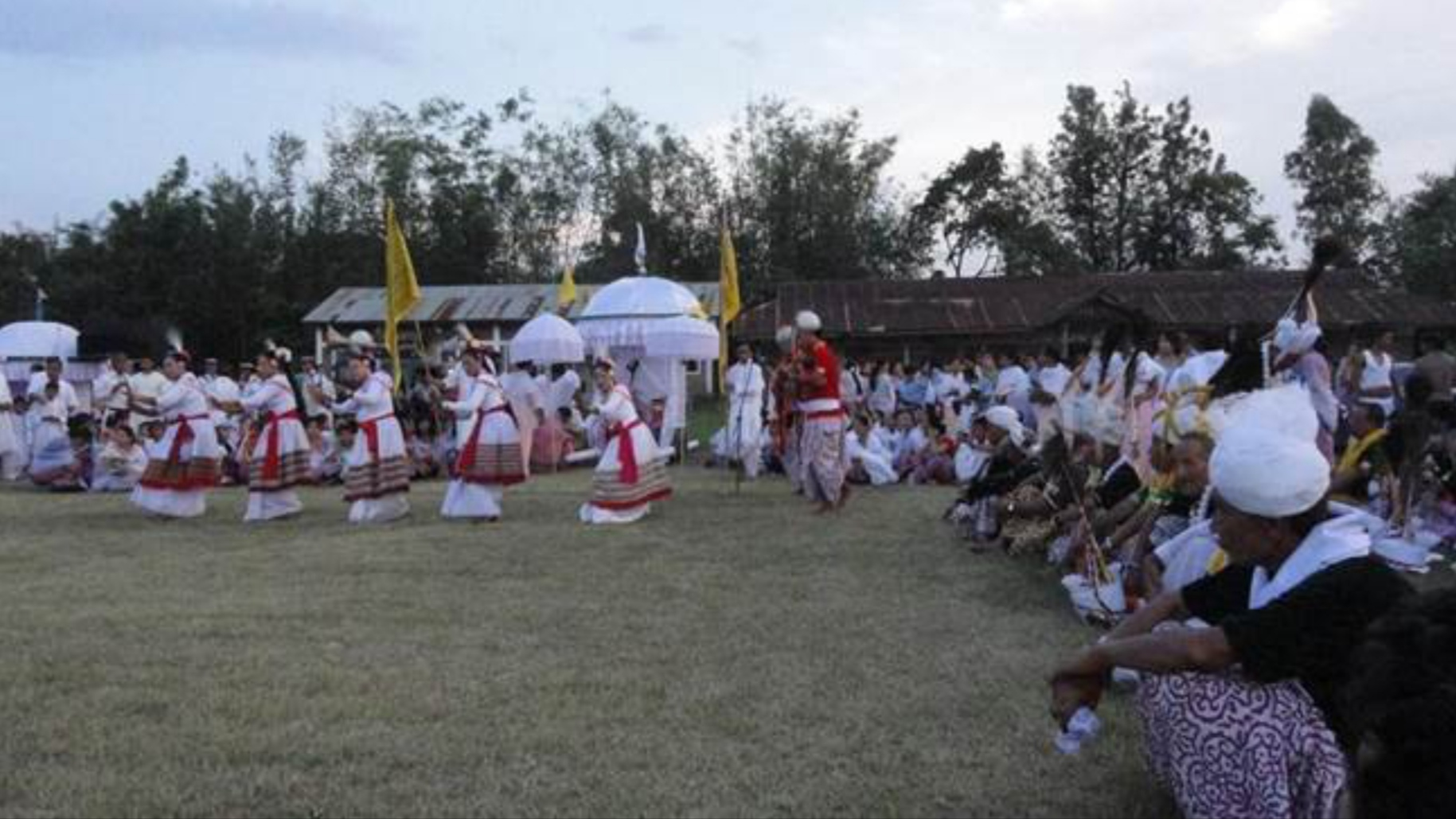
Modern day performance of Lai Haraoba, an ancient classical Meitei ritualistic music and dance drama (theatre) festival of traditional Meitei religion (Sanamahism) of Kangleipak

The classical performances of Lai Haraoba are not only "ritualistic" but also distinctively "histrionic", which strongly indicates its dramatic and theatrical elements.

== Origin ==
=== Lai Haraoba Festival ===
Lai Haraoba (ꯂꯥꯏ ꯍꯔꯥꯎꯕ) is made up of three types of festivals, each held in a different season:

- Chakpa Haraoba (ꯆꯛꯄ ꯍꯔꯥꯎꯕ, summer): Focuses on rituals to please the gods.
- Moirang Haraoba (ꯃꯣꯏꯔꯥꯡ ꯍꯔꯥꯎꯕ, autumn): Tells the adventurous love story of the deity Thangjing.
- Kanglei Haraoba (ꯀꯪꯂꯩ ꯍꯔꯥꯎꯕ, spring): Relates to the romantic story of Goddess Panthoibi and God Nongpok Ningthou.

These festivals take place outdoors and last for several days. Sacred natural sites like forests and meadows are used as venues. Priests (maibas) and priestesses (maibis) lead the rituals and wear traditional costumes, as do the participants. The themes of the performances are mainly centered on divine power and romantic love.

=== Dramatic Elements ===
Lai Haraoba includes plot, action, and dramatic situations. It reflects the aesthetic values of traditional Meitei culture. Historically, it was performed in over 300 locations, but only about a few of these remain in use today. Lai Haraoba has greatly influenced other forms of performance, including the classical dance drama Manipuri Raslila.

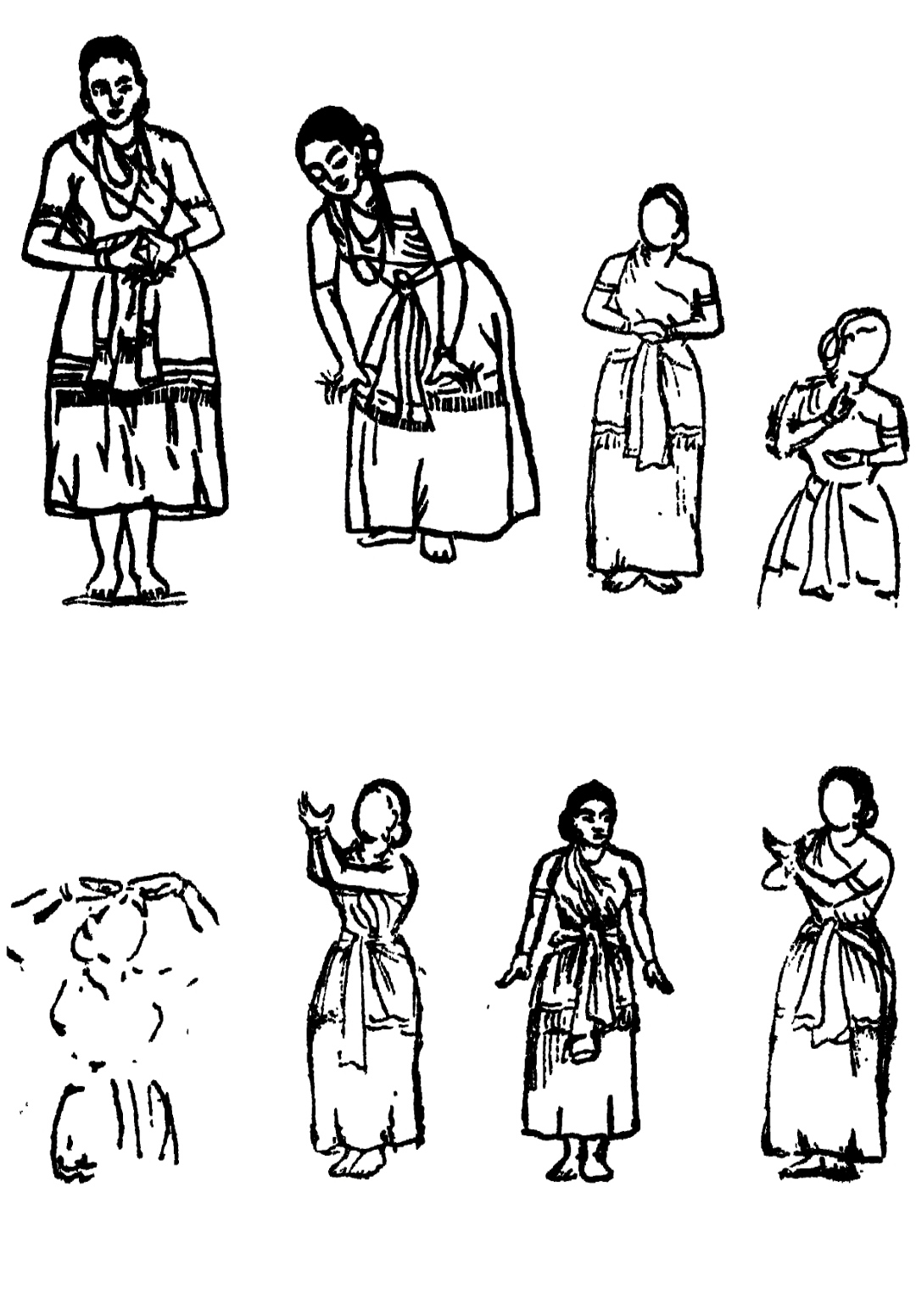
A series of Lai Haraoba classical dance & music ritualistic theatrical performances

== Antiquity ==
=== Early Meitei Drama ===
The earliest known Meitei drama appeared during the reign of King Khuyoi Tompok (ꯈꯨꯌꯣꯏ ꯇꯣꯝꯄꯣꯛ) in the 2nd century CE. Soldiers performed a play about the King’s military victories. This early drama focused on real-life events rather than mythological or fictional stories.

During the time of King Taothingmang (ꯇꯥꯎꯊꯤꯡꯃꯥꯡ, around 263 CE), a form of street performance developed where people wore black bamboo masks to drive away evil spirits. These plays were popular for about 100 years and emphasized the victory of good over evil. This style contributed to the development of opera in Manipur.

=== Development of Meitei Opera ===
Under King Naokhamba (ꯅꯥꯎꯈꯝꯕ, from 410 CE), opera began to take form in Manipur. It was different from Western opera. Initially, only royal men performed, but over time, others joined as well. The opera form of theatre was influential for over 1,300 years, from 410 CE to 1748 CE.

== Medieval times ==
Women began singing in operas during King Khagemba's rule in 1597 CE, making the performances more socially engaging. These operas included humor, action, and poetic dialogue to teach moral lessons. During King Chitsai’s reign (from 1748 CE), performances of the Ramayana were banned, and only Mahabharata-based stories continued.

=== Romantic Operas and Raslila ===
From 1753 CE, romantic themes became popular in Meitei opera. Stories of royal love were presented with detailed costumes and poetic dialogue. Plot and character development improved, and the performances became more complex and popular.

In 1776 CE, the Raslila emerged. It is a dance-drama based on the spiritual love stories of Krishna, influenced by sacred texts like the Bhagavat Purana and Gitagovinda. Raslila is considered a major cultural achievement and has shaped the aesthetics of Meitei drama.

=== Children’s Theatre ===
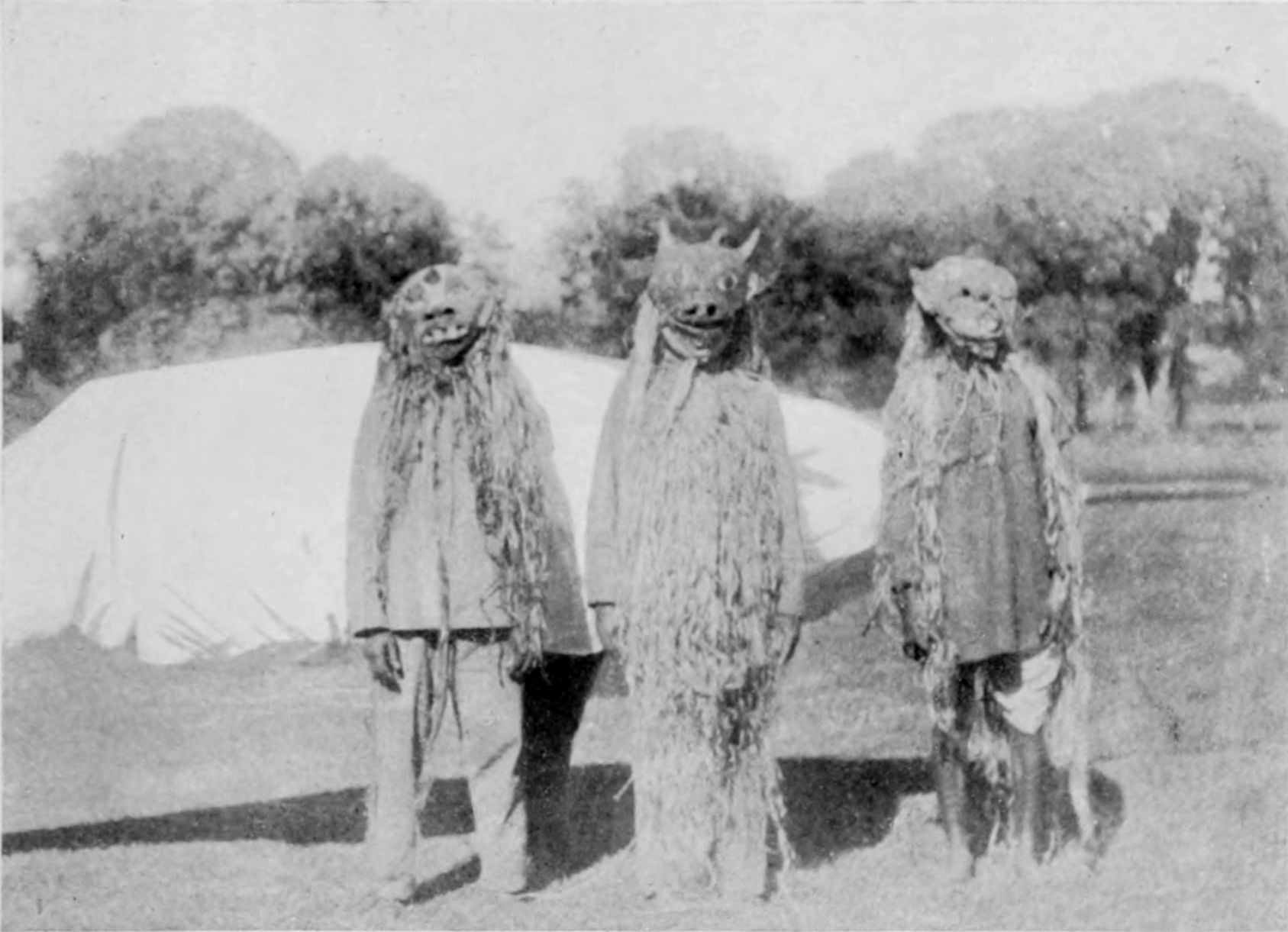
Demons and body of crane in San-jenba (cow-herding) play

In the early 19th century, a play called Sansenba (ꯁꯟꯁꯦꯟꯕ), focused on the childhood of Lord Krishna, was introduced. It involved only child performers and was staged partly indoors and partly outdoors. This marked the beginning of children's theatre in Manipur.

=== Kalia Daman and Realistic Theatre ===
Between 1851 and 1886, the mythological play Kaliya Daman was performed under King Chandrakirti Singh’s patronage. It showed Krishna defeating the serpent Kaliya and was staged in a natural setting to enhance realism. This performance marked a turning point in dramatic presentation. Other successful plays during this time included Draupadi Bastraharan, Chitrapat, and Udhukhol.

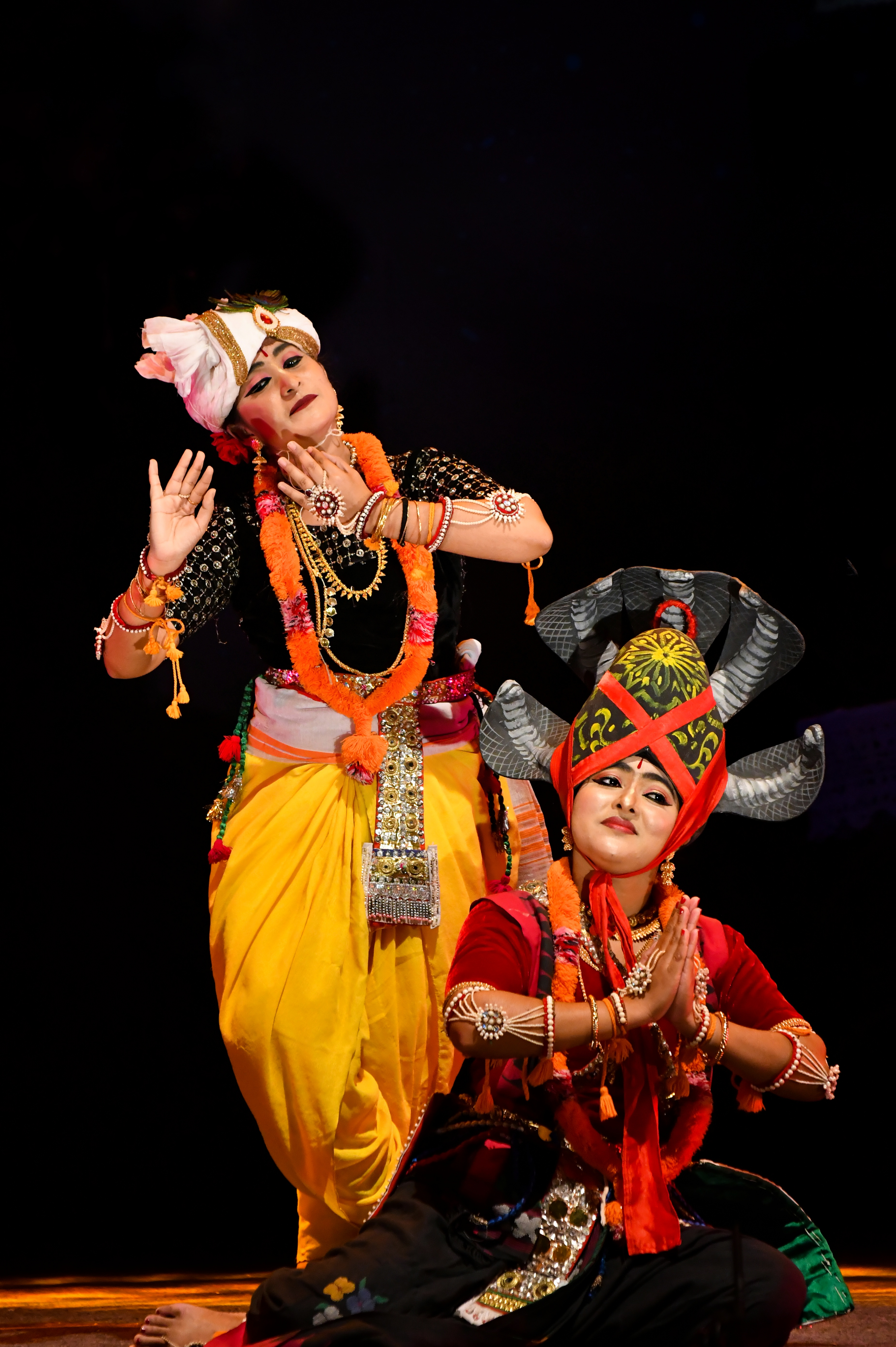
A scene of Lord Krishna defeating serpent Kaliya

== Secular period ==
The secular (non-religious) phase of Meitei drama began in the late 19th century. This period brought improvements in stagecraft, storytelling, and performance techniques, setting the foundation for modern Meitei theatre.

== See also ==
- Modern Meitei theatre
- Meitei intangible cultural heritage
- Lai Haraoba in Bangladesh
- Lai Haraoba in Myanmar
- Lai Haraoba in Tripura
- Meitei martial arts
- Meitei traditional weapons
- Meitei traditional toys
- Meitei dolls
- Hanglai Jagoi (puppet theatre)
- Meitei traditional games
- Ancient Meitei literature
  - Ancient Meitei hymns
  - Meitei ritual songs
