= Taibang Khaiba =

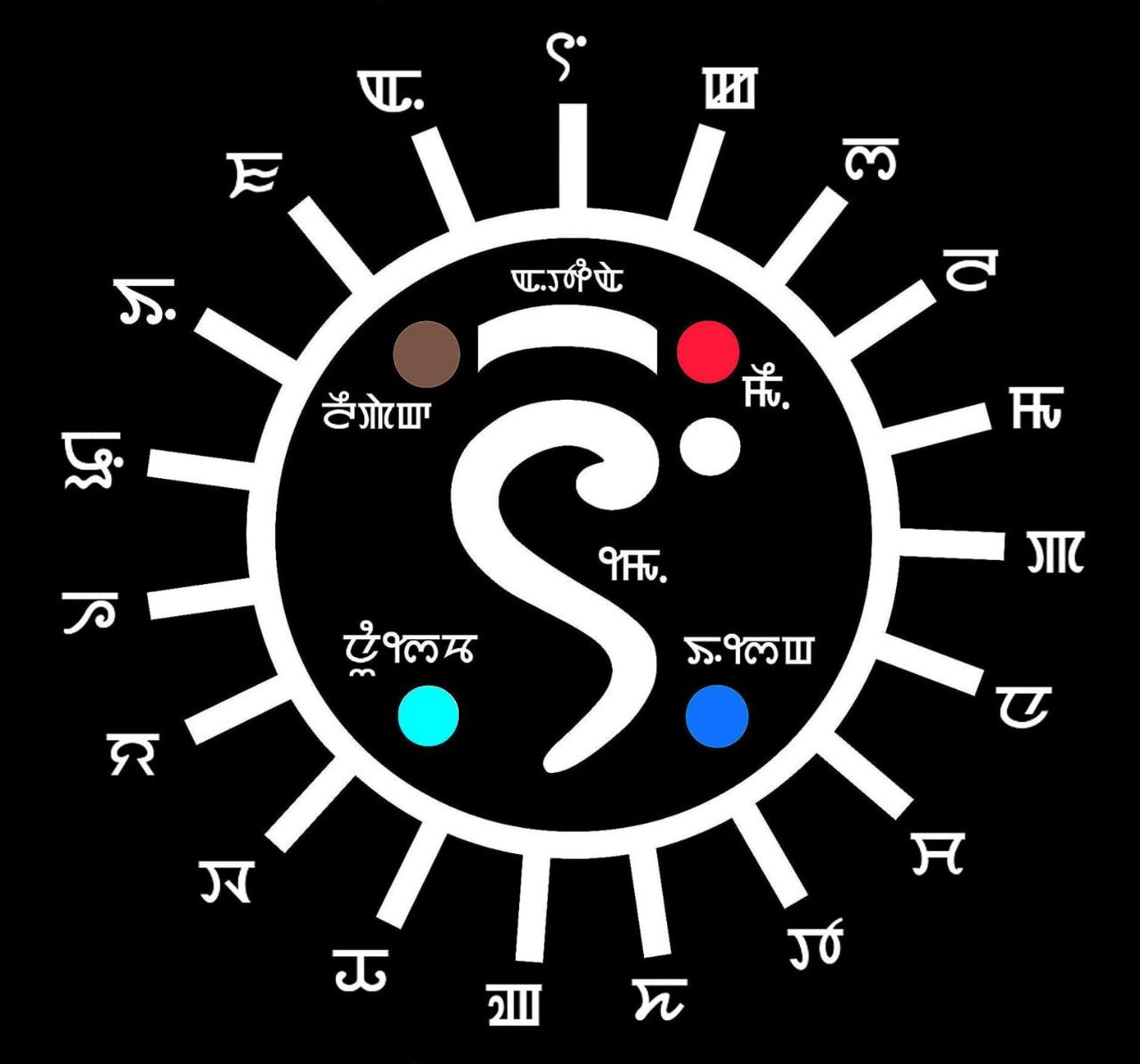
Taipang Khaiba is a divine manifestation of Sanamahi

Taibang Khaiba (ꯇꯥꯏꯕꯪ ꯈꯥꯏꯕ) is a deity in traditional Meitei religion of Sanamahism and ancient Meitei literature. He is mentioned in the classical Meitei texts such as the Sanamahi Laikan, the Sanamahi Laihui and the Khagemba Langjei. He is also identified with Lainingthou Sanamahi and Awang Phatlou Laimakhomba, and is believed to be the first son of the Supreme Being. He plays a central role in Meitei mythology and folklore as the creator of the world, the protector of humanity, and a guardian deity of the Meitei royal family (Ningthouja dynasty).

== Creator and divine son ==
According to Meitei belief, Taibang Khaiba created the earth and filled it with life, overcoming many difficulties. As the first-born son of the Almighty, he was given the responsibility of watching over mankind. He is also recognized as a presiding ancestral deity in Meitei tradition.

== Rebirth in human form ==
In the classical Meitei texts, Taibang Khaiba is described as being born again in human form as the son of King Khagemba and Queen Nongthil Chaibi. As a child, he mysteriously disappeared at the age of five. Later, he revealed his divine identity through a vision in a mirror, assuring his parents that he was the same god and that the kingdom would remain safe under his protection. His story is central to the Sanamahi Laikan, which shows him as both divine and deeply connected to human experience.

== Worship and temples ==
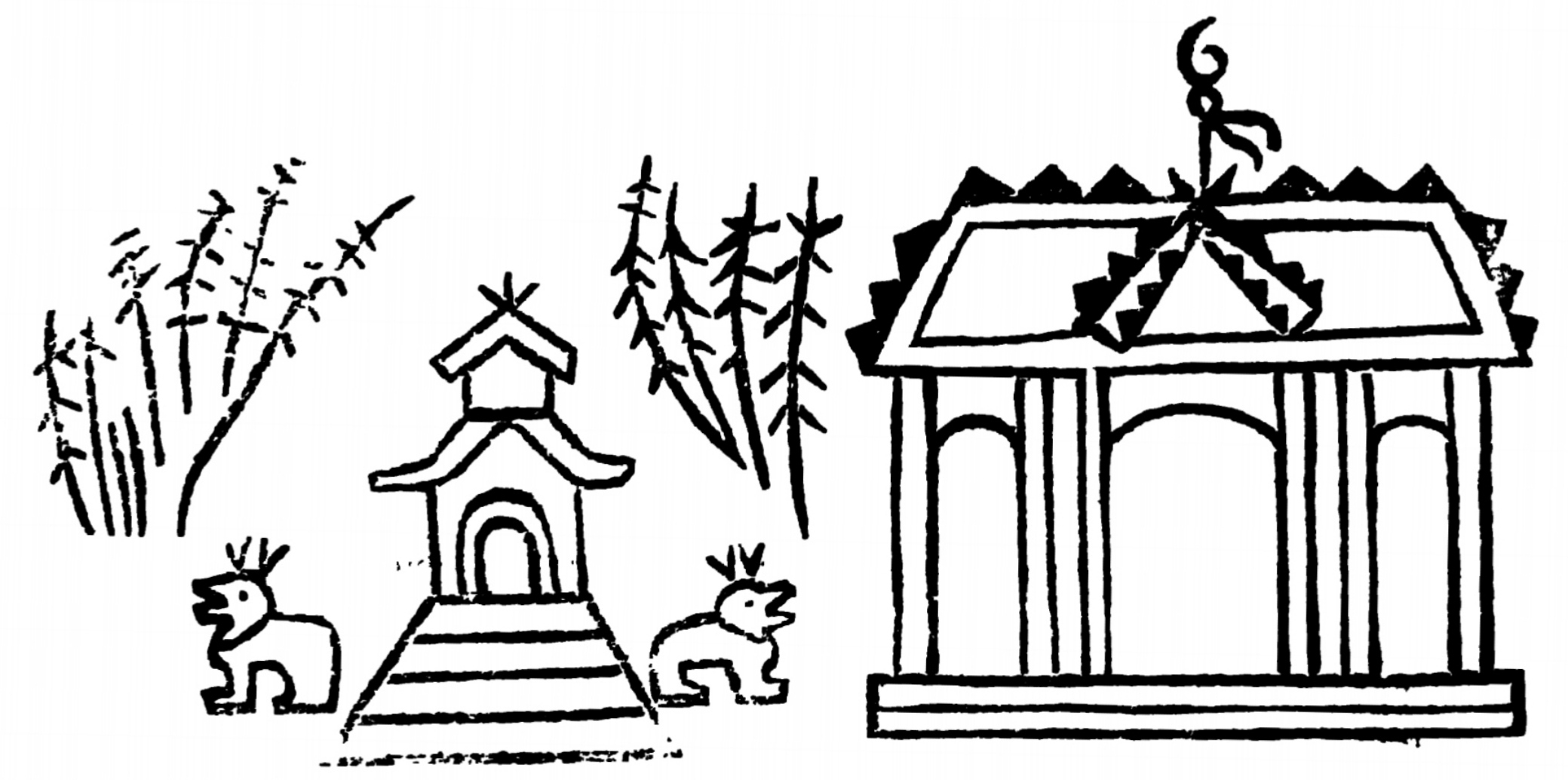
Temples of God Taibang Khaiba, a divine manifestation of Sanamahi, built by Meitei kings

Taibang Khaiba was honored by several Meitei kings. King Khagemba built a temple and installed a metal image of the deity after receiving signs of his divinity. King Charairongba also built a temple and offered the god new clothes and jewelry, continuing the tradition of devotion to the ancestral god. These are the expressions of gratitude and recognition of the god’s protection and blessings upon the kingdom.

== Divine intervention and punishment ==
Taibang Khaiba is known not only for protection but also for showing displeasure when disrespected. During the reign of King Pamheiba, who tried to replace traditional Meitei beliefs with the worship of Hindu deity Rama, Taibang Khaiba’s anger was shown through supernatural signs and misfortunes.

In the Sanamahi Laikan text, it is said that the god caused fear and illness in the royal household after his image was destroyed. When the king fasted and prayed for understanding, the god appeared to him in a form, glowing like the sun and riding a horse.

In the Khagemba Langjei text, the god saves the royal physician Moirang Lalhanba from a murder attempt ordered by the king. He also punishes the physician later for failing to welcome him back after a journey to Senbi (Burma). In this episode, the god enters Lalhanba’s house through the wall, attacks his servants, and binds the physician in cobwebs, showing his power and demand for reverence.

== Connection with Meitei rulers ==
The worship of Taibang Khaiba was closely linked to the success of Meitei rulers. Four kings in particular, Khagemba, Charairongba, Garibniwaj, and Chingthangkhomba, are shown in the classical Meitei texts to have received divine support from him. Khagemba was protected in battle and honored the god by building a temple. Charairongba achieved administrative success and military victories, and made offerings to the god. Garibniwaj, though devoted to Hindu deity Rama, is included in the tradition of kings under the god’s influence. Chingthangkhomba faced many trials but is shown to have enjoyed the god’s favor during difficult times.

== Literary symbolism and role ==
In both the Sanamahi Laikan and the Khagemba Langjei, Taibang Khaiba is shown as a powerful but personal deity. His actions are sometimes frightening but never destructive, and his main purpose is to restore respect and balance between the divine and human worlds. He appears in both mythological and human forms, showing the relationship between heaven and earth. He is also used by the writers to show the importance of ancestral religion, especially during times of religious change.

== In the Sanamahi Laihui text ==
In the Sanamahi Laihui text, Taibang Khaiba, also described as a form of Sanamahi, is described as the ancestral god who, under the command of the Almighty, created the habitable earth despite destructive opposition from his youngest brother, Pakhangba. He was then made the presiding deity of all living beings, showing his central role in the Meitei cosmology. The text shows his continued importance in Meitei civilisation mentioning how any deviation from his worship, especially inclinations toward Hinduism, resulted in divine warnings or misfortune for rulers like Khagemba, Charairongba, and Garibniwaj. Taibang Khaiba is shown as a protective and essential force for peace, prosperity, and rightful rule in the Meitei kingdom.

== See also ==
- Sanamahi Cheng Hongba
- Sanamahi Laihui
- Sanamahi Temple
- Pakhangba
