= Khumanlol =

Khumanlol (Meitei: ꯈꯨꯃꯟꯂꯣꯜ), also spelt as Khumanlon (Meitei: ꯈꯨꯃꯟꯂꯣꯟ), is a chronicle (puya) of the genealogy of the rulers of the Khuman dynasty, which flourished as an independent principality in the south of Ancient Manipur, and later absorbed into the Meitei ethnicity in the fourteenth century AD.

It is categorized as one of the historical documents of the ethnic groups settling in Manipur since seventh century AD.

== See also ==
- Ningthourol Lambuba

== Sources ==
- https://books.google.com/books?id=ajUysziXJzIC&q=khumanlon
