= Awang Phatlou Laimakhomba =

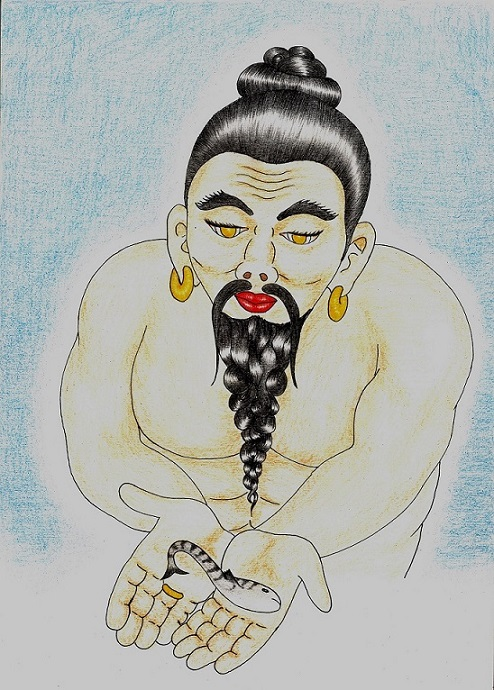
Awang Phatlou Laimakhomba is a divine manifestation of Lainingthou Sanamahi, the one who created living beings in the universe

Awang Phatlou Laimakhomba (ꯑꯋꯥꯡ ꯐꯥꯠꯂꯧ ꯂꯥꯏꯃꯈꯣꯝꯕ) is a deity in Meitei mythology, folklore and Sanamahism. He is a central figure in Meitei religious tradition, particularly in the holy text Sanamahi Laikan. He is identified with Lainingthou Sanamahi, a major ancestral deity of the Meitei people. He is both a cosmic creator and a reincarnated royal figure. According to traditions, he is the first son of the Supreme Being and holds an important place in the spiritual life of the Meitei civilisation.

== Mythological origins ==
Awang Phatlou Laimakhomba created the earth and filled it with living beings despite many challenges. After this, he became the guardian and presiding deity of humanity. This story is part of the mythological explanation of the world's origin in Meitei belief, as described in the Sanamahi Laikan.

== Rebirth as a Royal Child ==
According to traditional Meitei beliefs, Awang Phatlou Laimakhomba was born again as the son of King Khagemba and Queen Nongthil Chaibi. He lived briefly as a child and disappeared at the age of five. Later, he revealed his divine identity to his parents by showing his reflection in a mirror. He comforted them and promised peace and happiness for the kingdom, confirming that he was the same divine being from the creation story.

== Neglect and divine wrath ==
During the reign of King Pamheiba, the worship of Awang Phatlou Laimakhomba was rejected. The king even destroyed a metal image of the god. As a result, panic spread among the people, and the king's queen and son fell mysteriously ill.

The royal physician, Moirang Lalhanba, believed this was caused by the god's anger and advised the king to perform rituals to please him. Although the king first accepted the advice, he later chose to focus on the worship of deities of other faith, leading to greater signs of the god's displeasure.

=== Divine revelation ===
In order to learn the truth, King Pamheiba undertook a strict seven-day fast. On the third night, Awang Phatlou Laimakhomba was believed to have appeared to him in a form, shining like the sun and riding a horse. The king bowed down before him and accepted his power. He had new metal icons made in the likeness of the god and his consort.

== Personality and actions ==
Awang Phatlou Laimakhomba is described in the Meitei holy texts as a powerful but not destructive figure. His acts of mischief and miracles are meant to remind people of his importance. He only becomes truly wrathful when disrespected by the king of Kangleipak.

One example of his supernatural power is seen when he returns from a three-year stay in Senbi (Burma). Because Moirang Lalhanba fails to greet him properly, the god becomes angry. He enters the physician's home through a wall, attacks his servants, and leaves a frightening display of power, wrapping Lalhanba in cobwebs and glowing like fire.

== See also ==
- Sanamahi Cheng Hongba
- Sanamahi Laihui
- Sanamahi Temple
- Taibang Khaiba
- Pakhangba
