= Haoramhal =

Haoramhal (ꯍꯥꯎꯔꯝꯍꯜ), also known as Haoramhan (ꯍꯥꯎꯔꯝꯍꯟ), was a prince of the Khuman dynasty of the Khuman Kingdom, and was the eldest son of King Yoithong-ngai and Queen Nganurol Kaireima. He is remembered for the royal family conflict involving a sacred necklace. He is mentioned in the Khuman Kangleirol text and other works in ancient Meitei literature.

== Family ==
Haoramhal was the eldest son of King Yoithong-ngai and Queen Nganurol Kaireima. He had two younger brothers, Haoramyaima, the middle son, and Haoramton (also called Haoramtol), the youngest son.

The royal nomenclature of their names show birth order in the classical Meitei language (Khuman dialect) as "-hal / -han" means the eldest, "-yaima" means the middle, "-ton / -tol" means the youngest.

== Necklace inheritance tradition ==
King Yoithong-ngai once had an heirloom necklace which was given to his queen and later given to the three sons to be shared. They decided that the necklace would be used by each son in rotation, changing from one son to another each day.

== Visit to the Luwang Kingdom ==
One day, Luwang Ningthou Punshiba, the contemporary king of the Luwang dynasty, invited the Khuman royal family for a royal feast on the occasion of the inauguration of his new palace. Haoramhal and his brother Haoramyaima wanted to attend the banquet, wearing their best clothing. That day was the turn of Haoramton to use the heirloom necklace. Haoramton was away from home at the time. Haoramhal asked his mother for permission to wear the necklace for the event. Initially, she refused, saying it was Haoramton's day. Haoramhal then offered to give his own future turn day to Haoramton in exchange for wearing it for that particular day. Mother agreed. Haoramhal wore the necklace and went to the Luwang Kingdom.

== Attack by Haoramton ==
After learning that the necklace had been taken by Hapramhal, Haoramton became angry. He waited for his brothers on their return journey, hiding among trees and carrying the imperial sword. When Haoramhal and Haoramyaima returned, Haoramton launched a surprise attack. He severely wounded Haoramhal, immediately killing him on the spot, and forcibly took back the necklace.

=== Effects of sibling rivalry ===
The attack deeply affected the Khuman royal family. Witnessing the violence, Haoramhal's middle younger brother, Haoramyaima, feared for his own life and fled from the Khuman kingdom to the Moirang kingdom, where he later took refuge.

== See also ==
- Khuman Apokpa
- Khumanlol
- List of Khuman and Luwang common ancestral monarchs
- List of Khuman kings
- List of Khuman queens

== Bibliography ==
- Hodson, Thomas Callan. The Meitheis. India: D. Nutt, 1908.
- Gouramani, Kabrambam (1963-02-25). Khamba Thoibi Ahanba Saruk (in Manipuri). Manipur University Library, Imphal; North Eastern States Libraries. India: Digital Library of India; Internet Archive.
- Bormani, Sarangthem (2003). Moirang Shaion (in Manipuri). Manipur University Library, Imphal; North Eastern States Libraries. India: Digital Library of India; Internet Archive.
