= Haoramyaima =

Haoramyaima (ꯍꯥꯎꯔꯝꯌꯥꯏꯃ), also known as Haoramyai (ꯍꯥꯎꯔꯝꯌꯥꯏ), was a prince of the Khuman dynasty of the Khuman kingdom. He was the second son of King Yoithong-ngai and Queen Nganurol Kaireima. He is known for fleeing the Khuman kingdom after witnessing violence within the royal family and later settling in the Moirang kingdom.

== Background ==
Haoramyaima was one of three sons born to King Yoithong-ngai and Queen Nganurol Kaireima:

- Haoramhal (Haoramhan) – the eldest son
- Haoramyaima – the middle son
- Haoramton (Haoramtol) – the youngest son

In the Meitei language, the suffix -yaima means middle, indicating his position among the brothers.

== Necklace incident ==
A valuable necklace belonging to the Khuman royal family was shared among the three brothers. Each son wore the necklace in a daily rotation decided by their parents.

When the Khuman royals were invited to a feast in the Luwang kingdom, Haoramhal wore the necklace on a day that was originally assigned to Haoramton, after exchanging turns. Haoramyaima accompanied Haoramhal to the Luwang kingdom.

On their return journey, Haoramton attacked his brothers to reclaim the necklace. Haoramhal was nearly killed in the attack.

== Flight from the Khuman kingdom ==
Witnessing the violent attack on his elder brother, Haoramyaima feared that he might also be targeted in the future. Because of this fear, he fled from the Khuman kingdom.

He traveled to the Moirang kingdom and took refuge there.

== Life in Moirang ==
After arriving in Moirang, Haoramyaima was brought before the king of Moirang at the Moirang Kangla. In front of the king, warriors, ministers, and officials, he explained the events that led to his flight from Khuman.

He vowed to remain faithful and loyal to the Moirang kingdom and promised to work for its welfare rather than for the Khuman kingdom, despite being born into the Khuman dynasty. The Moirang king accepted his loyalty and granted him trust.

== Descendants ==
Haoramyaima had a son named Parenkoiba. Parenkoiba later had a son named Puremba (alias Purenba).

Puremba became a powerful warrior of the Moirang Kingdom, even though he was of Khuman royal blood through Haoramyaima.

== Legacy ==
Haoramyaima is significant for ending his direct role in the Khuman royal line by fleeing the kingdom. He was responsible for establishing a Khuman royal lineage within the Moirang Kingdom. Being the ancestor of Puremba, an important warrior figure in Moirang traditions, his decision to leave Khuman played a key role in linking the histories of the Khuman and Moirang kingdoms.

== See also ==
- Khuman Apokpa
- Khuman Kangleirol
- Moirang Kangleirol
- Khumanlol
- List of Khuman and Luwang common ancestral monarchs
- List of Khuman kings
- List of Khuman queens

== Bibliography ==
- Hodson, Thomas Callan. The Meitheis. India: D. Nutt, 1908.
- Gouramani, Kabrambam (1963-02-25). Khamba Thoibi Ahanba Saruk (in Manipuri). Manipur University Library, Imphal; North Eastern States Libraries. India: Digital Library of India; Internet Archive.
- Bormani, Sarangthem (2003). Moirang Shaion (in Manipuri). Manipur University Library, Imphal; North Eastern States Libraries. India: Digital Library of India; Internet Archive.
