= Meitei ritual songs =

Meitei religious songs

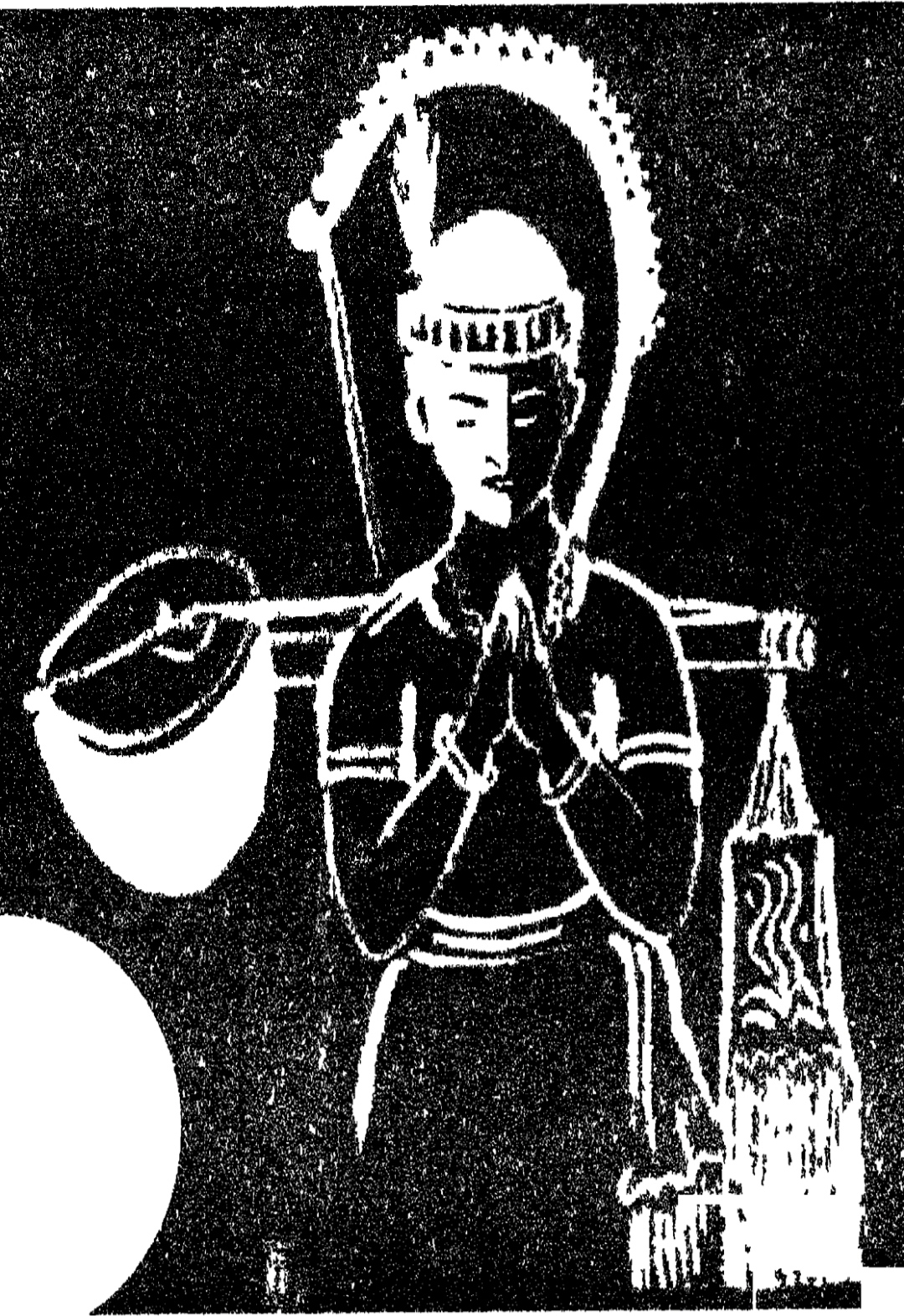
Traditional Meitei ritual songs are frequently accompanied by Pena (musical instrument)

Meitei ritual songs are traditional vocal compositions associated with the religious and ceremonial practices of the Meitei people of Manipur, northeast India. These songs are performed during various rituals, including those related to ancestor worship, seasonal Meitei festivals, and rites of passage associated with Sanamahism, the traditional ethnic religion of the Meitei civilisation. Characterized by specific melodic and rhythmic structures, they function as a medium for transmitting cultural knowledge, cosmological beliefs, and oral history within the community. The content and performance of these songs are often governed by customary protocols and are typically passed down through generations within ritual specialist groups. These represent important aspects of Meitei intangible cultural heritage.

Ritual songs hold great importance in many ceremonial and social events. Among them, Ahonglon, Yakeibā, Pākhangba Langyensei, Langmailon, and Kumdamsei are especially well known.

== Ancient times ==
Several songs are closely associated with the Lai Haraoba festival, notably Ougri, Khencho, Anoirol, and Lairemma Paosa. These compositions are traditionally considered to have been performed since the inception of the festival. These ritual songs adhere to specific metrical patterns. The initial section of Ougri comprises lines of six syllables each, while the subsequent section features lines averaging eight syllables. Khencho is consistently composed of lines containing six syllables. The verses of Lairemma Paosa and Anoirol exhibit less regularity in their meter; however, their use of alliteration and rhythmic structure contributes to a lyrical quality.

In addition to these ritual songs associated with the Lai Haraoba (ꯂꯥꯏ ꯍꯔꯥꯎꯕ) festival, Hijan Hirao (ꯍꯤꯖꯟ ꯍꯤꯔꯥꯎ) is a lengthy narrative poem characterized by its expression of profound human emotions through the use of pathetic fallacy and musical elements. It is regarded as an early example of creative literary composition within the tradition and is performed ceremonially on the final day of the festival. The poem primarily recounts an event traditionally believed to have taken place during the reign of Hongnem Luwang Ningthou Punshiba, a monarch of the Luwang dynasty dated approximately between the 4th and 6th centuries CE.

=== Ahonglon ===
Ahonglon (ꯑꯍꯣꯡꯂꯣꯟ) is a Meitei ritual song characterized by a vigorous rhythm and is associated with annual royal festivals conducted by successive Meitei kings. The song is noted for its antiquity, with references found in the Loyumba Sinyen, an 11th-century administrative manuscript that documents the allocation of duties among the king’s subjects. The continued oral transmission of Ahonglon is evident in its recitation by maibas (traditional ritual specialists), who preserve the poem in its complete form.

=== Yakeiba ===
Among the songs characterized by simpler diction, regular rhythmic structure, and the use of uniform line patterns, Yakeibā (ꯌꯥꯀꯩꯕ) is notable for its structured composition. The opening eighteen lines depict the rising of the sun through a series of detailed visual metaphors, such as its emergence from behind a gilded mountain peak, the unfolding of golden lotus petals, or the lifting of a golden curtain. This section is followed by a descriptive account of daybreak across various landscapes, including the hills, plains, and neighboring regions such as Burma, interwoven with regional myths and oral traditions.

The day breaks in the region of Moirang

When uthum, the water cock

Sweetly sings, 'Tum Tum'

In the thick bush by the lake.

And that was the bird

Transformed into by the soul of a woman

Who happened to be an unfortunate stepwife.

Thus the people of Moirang did perceive the awakening of dawn.

And on the side of Senbi (Burma)

The little bird that heralds morning

Is no other than the beautiful parrot

Which was transformed into by a lovely girl

Who used to protect her parents' field from wild birds.

The song is performed daily in the early morning by a professional singer accompanied by the pena, a traditional string instrument. It is used to awaken the king or as a morning prayer during the Lai Haraoba festival, with variations in the opening lines depending on the context. The composition features short lines of seven syllables, a caesura after the fourth syllable, and the use of alliteration with soft consonants, contributing to its formal aesthetic qualities.

=== Yakeiron ===
Yakeiron (ꯌꯥꯀꯩꯔꯣꯟ) is a category of Meitei ritual song that serves a similar function to Yakeibā, and is often associated with the call of a bird. While it lacks the extensive geographical scope and elaborate imagery characteristic of Yakeibā, it is distinguished by its expression of profound human emotion. The songs in this category emphasize internal sentiment over descriptive detail, contributing to their role in ceremonial and reflective contexts.

==== Story of Khainu Laiseng Chek ====
O king there is the story of dawn Being heralded by the bird Transformed into by the soul of Thongnang Tande, a weaver On the top of the ageing silk cotton tree.

According to Meitei tradition, a weaver who failed to complete a cloth within the three-day deadline set by the Cachari king, fearing severe punishment, took refuge in a nearby swampy thicket and transformed into a bird. The location later came to be known as Khainu Laiseng Chek (ꯈꯥꯏꯅꯨ ꯂꯥꯏꯁꯦꯡ ꯆꯦꯛ). A related narrative connects this event to a separate episode involving the chief of Heirem Khuncham.

In this account, the chief's daughter was detained by the Khuman king for illegally fishing in his territory. Despite repeated pleas and substantial offerings—including money, livestock, and attendants—the Khuman king refused to release her. Eventually, following a revelation in a dream, the Heirem chief presented the Khuman king with a bird of vividly colored plumage. Satisfied with the offering, the Khuman king agreed to free the captive.

==== Story of Oinu Shengpārāchā Chingyaichahuirong ====
Another narrative concerns a bird regarded as a harbinger of morning. According to the account, a pair of cranes—male leading, female following, with their offspring between them—were flying across the sky. During the flight, the young bird became entangled in a concealed nest suspended above. Distressed by the incident and attributing blame to her mate, the female crane proposed separation and flew westward to the land of the Mayangs, noted in Meitei tradition as a region of abundance. The male crane flew eastward toward the territories of the Awa and Kabo, characterized by dense forests throughout the year.

Subsequently, the male crane, overcome by solitude, returned in search of his mate, only to find her captured in a cage belonging to Thongnang Langshuba, a Mayang. She warned him to avoid sharing her fate. Following her advice, the bird, identified as Oinu Shengpārāchā Chingyaichahuirong (ꯑꯣꯏꯅꯨ ꯁꯦꯡꯄꯥꯔꯥꯆꯥ ꯆꯤꯡꯌꯥꯏꯆꯥꯍꯨꯏꯔꯣꯡ), returned to its native region of Thoubal. There, it is said to have cried continuously through the night. Its cries were heard by the Khuman queen, who interpreted the sound as a sign of the approaching dawn. Upon inquiry, the queen's musician responded without delay.

O Khuman Queen, the sweet voice

Heard from afar is neither

the warwhoop of the Thangas your relatives

Nor the wordy altercations of the Kampongs,

But the mournful cry of Chingyaichāhuirong,

The lonely bird separated from its mate and

Who also has been robbed of its only child

In front of the fishing weir at Thoubal.

"Then change its name", the queen added,

"To Lamyai Lonkhei Ningthousa, the harbinger

Of morning in the region of the Khumans."

— Queen's magician

The bard said, "This is not the only bird that sings of crack of dawn."

== Medieval times ==
=== Pakhangba Langyensei ===
Pākhangbā Lāngyensei (ꯄꯥꯈꯪꯕ ꯂꯥꯡꯌꯦꯟꯁꯩ) is a ritual composition closely associated with the coronation ceremony in Meitei tradition and is generally regarded as a later addition to the corpus of ritual poetry. Despite this, its thematic content—which includes references to the divine nature of Meitei kingship, cosmogonic myths concerning the origin of humanity and the universe, and various philosophical motifs—supports its inclusion within the broader framework of early Manipuri poetic tradition. The text comprises forty-eight stanzas, each consisting of three lines, with the third line marked by a recurring syllabic refrain.

=== Langmailon ===
Langmailon (ꯂꯥꯡꯃꯥꯏꯂꯣꯟ) is a ritual composition performed during ceremonial events associated with the coronation of a Meitei king or the celebration of military or political victories. The text is marked by a resonant rhythmic structure and enumerates various honorific titles attributed to the monarch, reflecting his accomplishments and the perceived grandeur of his realm. The composition concludes with references to two prominent historical figures in Meitei history—Thawanthaba and Khagemba—who are invoked as exemplars of royal authority and achievement.

=== Kumdamsei ===
Kumdamsei (ꯀꯨꯝꯗꯝꯁꯩ), meaning "the song that ushers in a new season," represents the culmination of an extended development of Meitei ritual songs. It is characterized by the absence of archaic language, refined compositional techniques, the integration of allusions, and the use of appropriate similes. The text comprises 485 lines and addresses themes such as the creation and beauty of the earth and sky, the exploits of the figure Poinaota, the mythological account of Khongchomnubi and her companions who were transformed into the Pleiades, the transition from the old season to spring marked by verdant hills and plains, and the onset of the monsoon with filled lakes and rivers. Interspersed within these narratives are passages containing philosophical and moral reflections. Notably, Kumdamsei is the first ritual song in the tradition to explicitly name its author.

== See also ==
- Lai Haraoba
- Meitei martial arts
- Meitei traditional weapons
- Meitei traditional games
- Meitei traditional toys
