= Sanamahi Laihui =

The Sanamahi Laihui is a religious sacred text of Sanamahism, the Meitei religion of Ancient Kangleipak. It is considered by Sanamahis to be the divine account of the power of Lainingthou Sanamahi, a primordial deity.

== History ==
Its date of publishing is uncertain.

It is one of the most prestigious Puya, ever written in Meitei language. It serves as one of the authoritative accounts for the religion of Sanamahism.
