= Meitei hymns =

Ancient Meitei praise songs

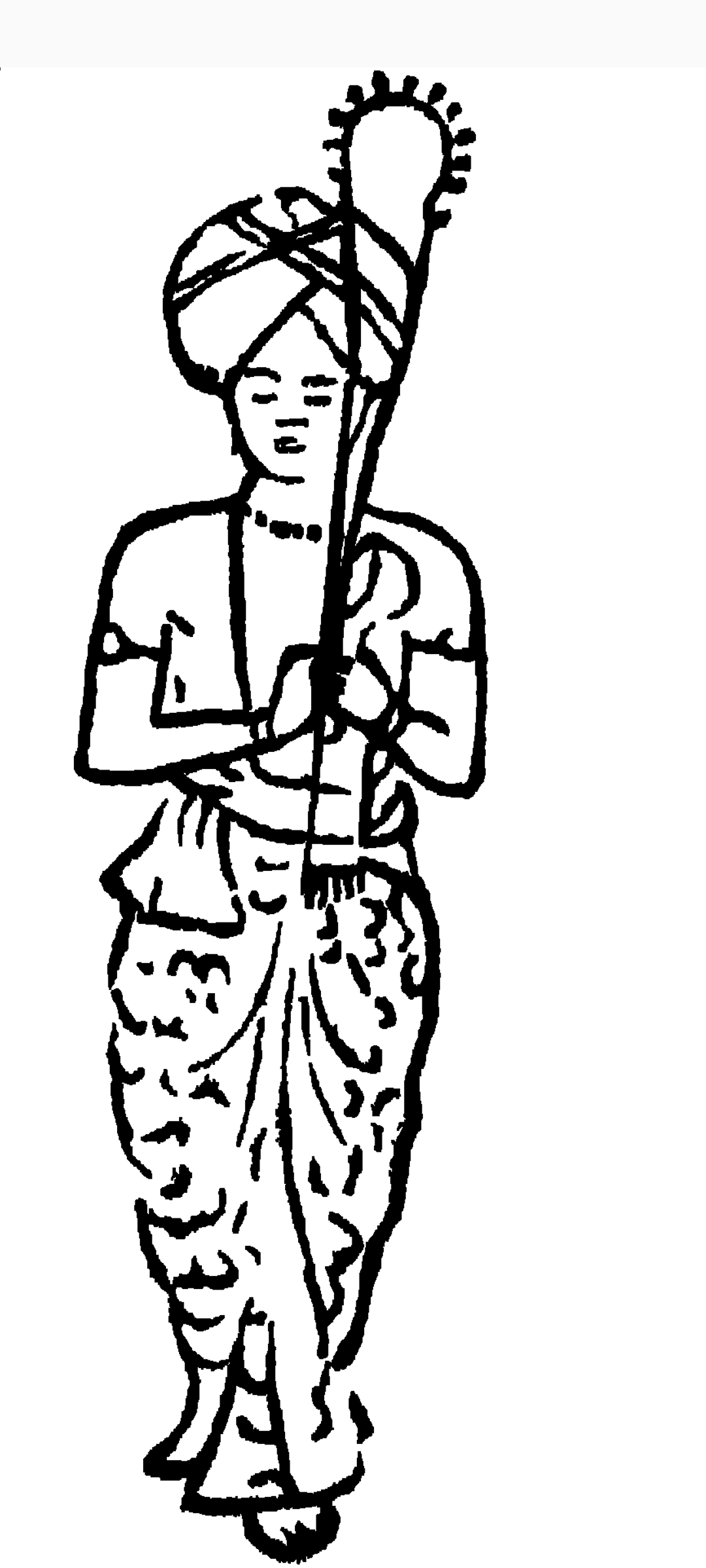
Ancient Meitei hymns were sung by balladeers, often playing Pena (musical instrument)

Ancient Meitei hymns are traditional ritual chants originating from the Meitei people of Manipur in Northeast India. Composed in the Meitei language, these hymns form a part of the Meitei folklore associated primarily with Sanamahism, the indigenous religion of the Meitei. They are typically recited or sung during religious ceremonies, seasonal Meitei festivals, and rites of passage. The content of the hymns includes invocations to deities, cosmological narratives, and expressions of ethical or spiritual principles. Preserved through inter-generational transmissions, they represent an early form of Meitei literary and religious expression. These represent important aspects of Meitei intangible cultural heritage.

Before their religion fully developed, the ancient Meitei people, like many others, worshipped natural objects and respected the spirits they believed lived in them. They also worshipped their ancestors. As their customs and traditions grew, they created many religious songs. Their beliefs and religious events also led to the creation of hymns. Some of these songs and hymns include: Sana Lamok, Apoklon, Mei, Nonglao Eesei, Louta Eesei, and Phoukouron.

== Sana Lamok ==
Sanā Lamok (ꯁꯅꯥ ꯂꯝꯑꯣꯛ) is a song filled with music and is a prayer sung to Pakhangba, one of the main gods of the Meitei people. It gently asks the god to accept their prayer and to appear before them. The song is mentioned in the story Naothingkhong Phambal Kābā, where it was taught to Prince Hongnemyoi Khunjao by the wise Luwang king. It is also clearly mentioned in the Loyumba Sinyen as a song sung during the coronation of King Loiyumba.

The language of this song, like many old songs, is very old-fashioned, and many of the references are hard to understand today.

== Apoklon ==
Apoklon (ꯑꯄꯣꯛꯂꯣꯟ) is a prayer to the first ancestor, asking for blessings of long life and wealth for all people.

== Mei ==
Mei (ꯃꯩ) is a short song sung during the worship of the fire god, using a special fire called needfire. Like the sound of a stream flowing over stones, it uses short lines of five and seven syllables to describe the different names of fire. These names come from the things burned during religious rituals and from its link to Poireiton, an early traveler who came to Manipur in early times.

== Nonglao Eesei ==
Nonglao Eesei (ꯅꯣꯡꯂꯥꯎ ꯏꯁꯩ / ꯅꯣꯡꯂꯥꯑꯣ ꯏꯁꯩ) is a fun song sung in groups during a serious drought. It is sung before dawn by men and women. The song asks the rain to come down heavily. It tells a funny story about how Salailen (also called Soraren), the lord of heaven, was tricked by Taothingmang, a Meitei prince of the Ningthouja dynasty. The prince fooled Soraren into giving his “sister” to the rain-god as a bride, even though he had no sister. Soraren came to earth with many people, and the prince pretended to be the bride. But while crossing a bridge, the prince jumped into the Imphal river and disappeared. Angry, the rain-god caused heavy rain, flooding the whole valley.

The song asks the rain to come again like that, to flood the Langjing Hills, wash away the old men and women, and young girls of Patsoi, so the boys from Unam can find them.

== Louta Eesei ==
Louta Eesei (ꯂꯧꯇꯥ ꯏꯁꯩ) is a song sung the day before ploughing the field when the planting season starts. It begins with a lively chant of special sounds, then tells about the bright Sun’s greatness. The song also tells the story of the first time the earth was turned for planting by a divine couple, helped by other gods. It ends with a strong, heartfelt prayer asking for a good harvest and many blessings.

== Phoukouron ==
Phoukouron (ꯐꯧꯀꯧꯔꯣꯟ) (Note: also known as Phoukourol (ꯐꯧꯀꯧꯔꯣꯜ), Phoukoulon (ꯐꯧꯀꯧꯂꯣꯟ) or Phoukoulol (ꯐꯧꯀꯧꯂꯣꯜ)) is a song sung during harvest time. Unlike the earlier songs, it has a slower rhythm and uses unusual or mysterious words. However, the ending lines clearly show the purpose of the song — to humbly ask the goddess of crops, Phouoibi, often described as the Meitei equivalent of Demeter, to generously bless the people with a rich harvest.

== Decline ==
By the end of the 17th century, people stopped using such ritual songs and hymns. With the arrival of Hinduism, these traditional songs were no longer supported or encouraged.

== See also ==
- Lai Haraoba
- Meitei martial arts
- Meitei traditional weapons
- Meitei traditional games
- Meitei traditional toys
