= Numit Kappa =

Ancient Meitei epic poetry

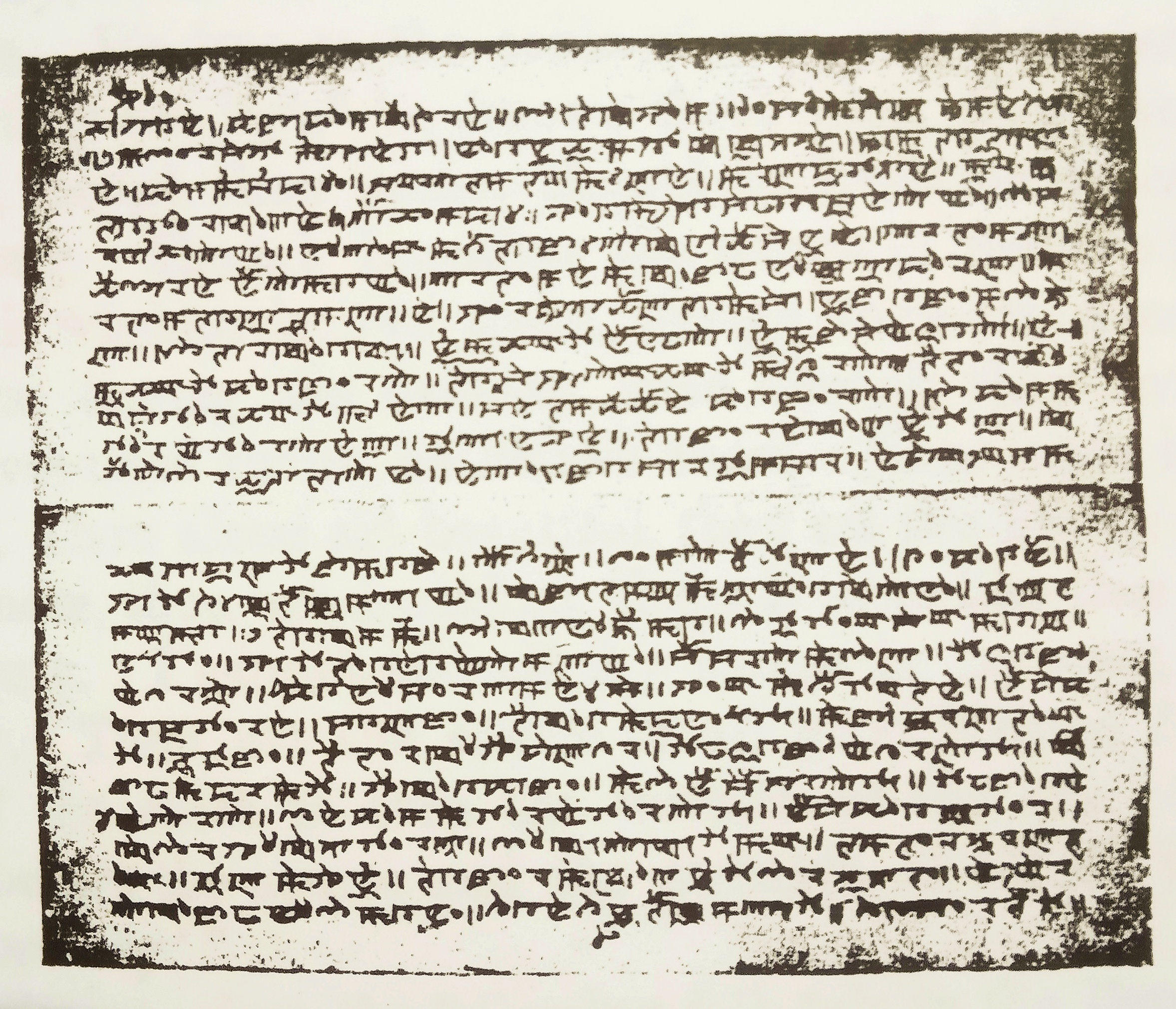
- Author: Unknown
- Language: Meitei language (officially called Manipuri language)
- Subject: Meitei literature (Manipuri literature)
- Genre: Epic poetry
- Publication place: Kangleipak (historical); India (current)
- The Story is based on the shooting of one of the two Suns to create Night

Numit Kappa (Meitei: ꯅꯨꯃꯤꯠ ꯀꯥꯞꯄ, lit. 'Shooting of the Sun') is an ancient Meitei language mythological epic literary work. The work is believed to be written around or before 33 AD. It is written in the form of partial poetry and partial prose.

The epic work is still considered to be the oldest known epic account in Meitei literature.

== Synopsis ==
In the epic, there are two Sun Gods, who brighten the world simultaneously. One was to be slain in order to create the night. The hero, Khwai Nungjeng Piba was an expert archer, who shot Taothuireng, one of the two Suns in the sky.

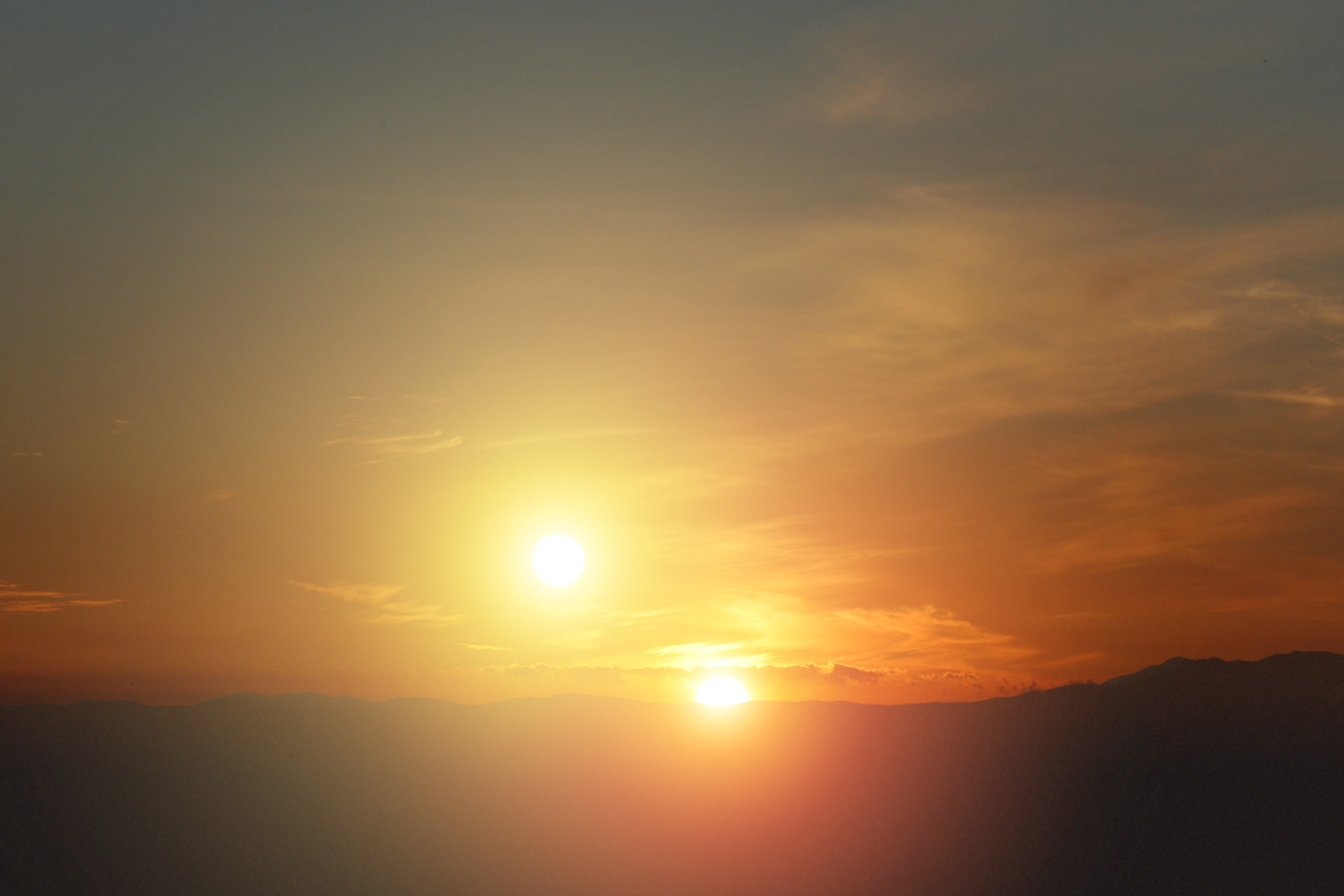
Two Suns shining in the sky at a time

=== Two survived out of the five sons of the Celestial Goddess ===
"O my Mother, O Mother of the Sun who is the Father of the world, O Mother of all the Gods. She who was the Mother of the World gave birth one day to three sons. The first-born son was destroyed like withered paddy, and became like old dry paddy, and entered into the earth, and became even as the ant heaps. Thereupon the Lairemma (Meitei for 'goddess') paddy and the great paddy were turned into Morasi and Iroya paddy. Her second-born son became rotten even as chicken's eggs, he became as the darkening rainbow. His eyes became like unto the eyes of a deer. Her third-born son was called Koide Ngamba, the younger brother of the Sun. He was of a haughty temper and quick in spirit. He fell into a fishing weir and was killed. Thereupon his teeth became like the teeth of a wild beast, his rib-bones became the long dao of the Gods. The hairs of his head became like the flowers that men offer to Pureiromba and all the other Gods." They became even as the flowers that men fasten on the ends of their spears to catch luangs (small hill fish) in December, or like to the flowers that the King's wives and children present to the fields, such flowers as the Angom Ningthou daily offers up, even as such became the white hairs of the God.

=== The exploitations of slave Khwai Nongjengba and his reactionary plots ===
"Now the Sun and his brother Taohuirenga rose and set alternately. There was a man Khowai Nongjengba who had a slave, a lazy churl named Ekma Haodongla, who was wroth because the suns rose and set alternately. He said, 'I am a slave and twice have I to fetch wood, twice to bring in my master's paddy on my head. I cannot rear my children. I cannot see my wife. So he said to his wife, 'My dear, go, get a bamboo from your father.' But her father would not give her a bamboo. 'Go to your uncle and beg a bamboo from the Thongkhongkhural, a bamboo that grows on the Khural King's Sokpa Ching.' Thus he said, and sent her off. The Khural Lakpa gave him a bamboo from the hill. The slave of Khowai Nongjengba Piba in five days made a bow and arrows, and when he had dried them, he smeared the tips of the arrows with poison, and put the arrows in the quiver and rested. Then he said, 'Dear wife, Haonu Changkanu, my pretty one, go draw water and put the pot on your head. Then as his wife came from the water, he aimed and hit the pot on her head. One day he aimed and hit the hole in her ear. One day he aimed and hit a sparrow sitting on a heap of dhan. 'Wife, make food ready. A big boar has entered the field, a great python has come into the field. I will combat those strong things. I will kill that boar.' He slept by the side of the things he was going to take to the field, and for this reason the place is called "Thongyala Mamungshi".

=== Shooting of one of the two Suns and the hiding of the surviving Sun in a cave ===
The Great Sun set at Loijing. His elder brother Taohuireng arose in his splendour, and Ekma Haodongla the slave of Khowai Nongjengba Piba, a lazy churl, drew the string to his cheek and though he fired the arrow carefully at the sun, he hit the sun's horse on the leg, and it fell near the great Maring village. When the bright sun fell by the arrow of the slave of Khowai Nongjengba Piba, he was afraid and hid himself in the earth in a great cave by the big village near the shrine of Pakhangba and Sanamahi. Then the Meitei land was dark by day and dark by night. The fields and the whole countryside looked to the Gods for pity because the day remained not. Weeds grew. Women that used to go to the fields went no more, women that used to toil in the fields went no more. The ten kings (Nongpok Ningthou, Chingkhai, Wangpulen, Khana Chaoba, Thangching, Sampurel, Loyalakpa, Koupalu, Kaoburel, Marjing), these ten gods knew not how to look for the place where the sun was. A woman going to the field was holding converse with a woman going to sow, 'My friend, my companion, what is that fire in the earth shining there over by the great village?' said she inquiring. 'Yes, my dear, the Sun is hiding near the shrine of God Pakhangba and Sanamahi.' 'It is the brightness of the Sun,' said the other as they talked. The ten Gods heard, and when they had returned to their own house, they called Thongnak, whose dreams were very true. Thongnak Lairemma, your dreams are very true, a dead person has entered into you. You do judgment on the dead. Call the Sun.' With these words they sent her.

=== Efforts of Goddess Thongak Lairembi to call the hiding Sun back ===
Thongnak Lairemma called the Sun. 'O Sun, by reason of thy disappearance, the land of the Meiteis is in darkness day and night. Bring thy warmth over this land and over its villages.' Thus said she, and the Sun made answer to her. Yea, Thōngnāk Lairemma, formerly my Mother, who is Mother of all the Gods and the Mother of the world, gave birth to five sons. One day my eldest brother shrivelled up like dry paddy and was destroyed. My second brother became rotten like the eggs of a fowl, my brother Koidè Ngamba fell into a fishing weir and was drowned. Now my elder brother Taohuirengba has fallen by the arrow of the slave of Khowai Nongjengba Piba, for his horse was pierced through the leg by the arrow which he shot, and so he hides in a dark cave.' Thus he spake, and would not come forth. Thōngnāk Lairemma returned to her abode. Ye ten Gods, hear. The Sun cannot remain alone in the world.' Then the ten Gods hired Panthoibi, the daughter of the Meitei King, the wife of Khaba. O daughter of the King, who art beloved of the King of the country, who causest to be born all the souls of men and dost cause them to die, who art the Mother of the Gods and the Mother of all the country, thy face is beautiful, do thou go, do thou call thy Father the Sun.' When they said this, the King's dear daughter who causes a flower to bloom merely by touching a big white leaf, assented to their request. Ye Ten Gods, if ye bid me to persuade the bright Sun to come forth, make ready the roads, make men to go to and fro, build a machan five stories high, make the women all join in entreaties to him. In the baskets spread leaves carefully and set therein white rice, put eggs, fill the wine jars full of wine, wrap ginger in leaves and set it down, wrap cowries up in a black cloth and put them down near.' Then she took a white cock and all the other things and went to the broad country to persuade the bright Sun.

=== Request to the hiding Sun by Goddess Panthoibi ===
"O Sun, by reason of your hiding, in the land of the Meiteis there is darkness night and day; by your brightness warm all the country to Imphal from here. Thus she said and thus she persuaded him, for he assented, and when the white fowl lifted up its foot on the earth, the Sun also raised his foot from the earth five times and climbed to the top of the machan. Then the ten Gods looked and saw that the sunshine was pale. Let us make this right,' they said. Then Pakhangba's priest sat on the right, and the priest of Thangjing, the God of Moirang, sat on the left. They took water from the river of Moirang, and an egg and yellow grass, and drew water from the top of Nongmaiching, and the priests, the children of the Gods, made the face of the Sun right, and his eyes and his face were bright and beautiful. Panthoibi holding the fowl soothed the Sun. Then the priest, who formerly guarded the seven branches of Nongmaiching, and who lived on that holy hill, whose name was Langmai Khoiri, who formerly worshipped the face of the sun, made prayers to the Sun. Thou hast come like the eyes of the hill. In the likeness of the eyes of the hill in thy brightness thou hast pitied us, the villages of Nongmaiching. Like the eyes of the Sun thou hast come. Like the eyes of the Sun by thy brightness the warmth of the sun has warmed all the ravines and jungle and all our villages on Nongmaiching.' Thus said he as he prayed."

=== Return of the Sun due to prayers ===
The great village also made prayers to the Sun, and its priests sang and prayed. The women also of the great village have crossed the river and have gone to the fields. The Tangkhuls have taken up their daos. Men see their shadow in the water. By thy brightness all the paths and all the trees and all the bamboos in our great village are warm with the warmth of the sun.' Thus said he and prayed. Then the brothers, the cunning priests, slaves of Thangjing, prayed to the Sun God, 'O thou born on the stone, born on the white stone, who lightest the jungle, and the water, and who shinest up to the top of the loftiest bamboo, with thy brightness make warm the heat of the sun on the water of Moirang.' In the south the Khuman priest prayed. His father and his forefathers were very skilful, and his voice was very good, and his singing carried far. Than him there was none greater, his voice was like the cry of the crane, and in his singing there was no fault. Thus prayed he. 'O Sun, now that thou hast come, the trees, the bamboos, the grass, all are bright. O Sun by thy glorious brightness the leaves and the wood are as new, the heart is glad. By thy brightness make warm the heat of the sun upon the land of the Khumans. Then the priest of the King of Kangleipak, who was skilled in the songs of the Meiteis, whose voice was like the running water, invoked by name his deceased mother, and singing sweetly the name of his dead father, having sung the names of men that were dead and making them to unite in the history, he makes birds and crows that are dead to be among the Gods. He knows the souls of men and their names, even though they are lost, he knows them when they have become animals, though their names should be forgotten, he calls them in his song. Though hereafter the names of men be forgotten, he in his wisdom knows them, though they are wandering in the abyss among the demons, even though they have joined themselves unto swine, he knows them. Thus made he prayer. 'O Sun, Thou alone art beautiful, thou art the Father of all the unfortunate, thou art deathless, there is none like thee for truth and beauty. I cannot tell all thy names in my song, so many are they. Thou art the source of all good fortune, for in the scent of the earth is seen the warmth of the sun. O Bright Sun, thou art the source and the strength of all the world and of immortality.'

== Analysis ==
The Numit Kappa shows the political scenario in an allegorical element. It is considered by many scholars to be an all the time apparent. When the female priest sang in her melodious voice in admiration of the younger sun, she was narrating the sufferings of the people to the sun. The sun could no longer resist and his first response is as follows:

“Addressing her, Nongpok Touring Leimacha (the younger sun) points out that his mother, the Goddess Korou Nongmai Hanpi, first raised a son who was still-born; the second too did not last long as an unhatched egg; the third one fondly called Sană Khommat on Numit Kaite Ngampā when yet a frolicking child met with his watery grave in a fishing trap, his luxuriant hair turning into the white flower of the tall wild grass and his pearly teeth taking the form of bright cowries; his brother Tauhuireng Ahanpa and elder to him also fell a victim to the sharp arrows of Khwai Nongchengpam Näicha Pongparacha Atanpa; his mount too, fatally wounded, rolled down the slopes of Khunbirok and his elder brother a scion of the blood royal and resplendent like an incandescent flame had wandered off into the other side of the firmament. "Therefore, O Chakpa Amãipi," he further says, "I cannot yield to your call and come back alone. To think of the piercing arrows--they still fright me. Nor do have I the desire like my brother to head for the other world, nor be amidst mankind again, but would rather pass the rest of my life here quietly.”

The secondary meaning of the lines in the text was very clearly written, especially in the episode of the event when Sana Khomadon, a sadder and a wiser man, left his place of hiding. The priests of the Moirang and Meitei ethnicity praised him with sweet sounded ritual songs, give him holy bath with the sacred waters of the Kangla, with different medicinal herbs dipped in it. Later, he becomes shining very brightly like his elder brother. All the darkness got dispelled from every nook and corners of the realm. Consequently, the farm hands began to be busy with ploughing, flocks of birds flying out in search of food and evil spirits taking to their heels. So, there was light and warmth all around the realm.

The last lines in the final part of the text, in a loud and forceful manner, extol the rare excellencies of Sana Khomadon whom the poet, in happiness, compares to the flame that shines throughout eternity.

== In Meitei religion ==
- The archaic terms in Meitei language is still chanted by the priestesses during Chupsaba ceremony (a ritual associated with the special kind of death in Meitei cosmology), in the form of hymns.

== English translation ==
- The first English translation of the epic poetry was published in the book The Meitheis, written by T.C. Hodson in the year 1908.

== In popular culture ==
- Recently, the epic is reenacted in the form of play, at Delhi based National Institute of Performing Arts (NIPA) under the directions of Sarungbam Biren.

== Comparative myths ==
- Chinese mythology - Archer Hou Yi shooting the 9 out of 10 suns
- Japanese mythology - Solar deity Amaterasu hiding inside the Amano-Iwato cave

== See also ==
- Binary star - a system of two stars
- Khamba Thoibi - another epic of Meitei literature
- List of epics in Meitei language
- Multiple suns

== Bibliography ==
- Numit Kappa
- The Meitheis

== Sources ==
This article incorporates text from a free content work. Licensed under out of copyright (license statement/permission). Text taken from The Meitheis, Thomas Callan Hodson, David Nutt.
