= Ancient Meitei literature =

Ancient Meitei language literature

Ancient Meitei literature (Old Manipuri literature)
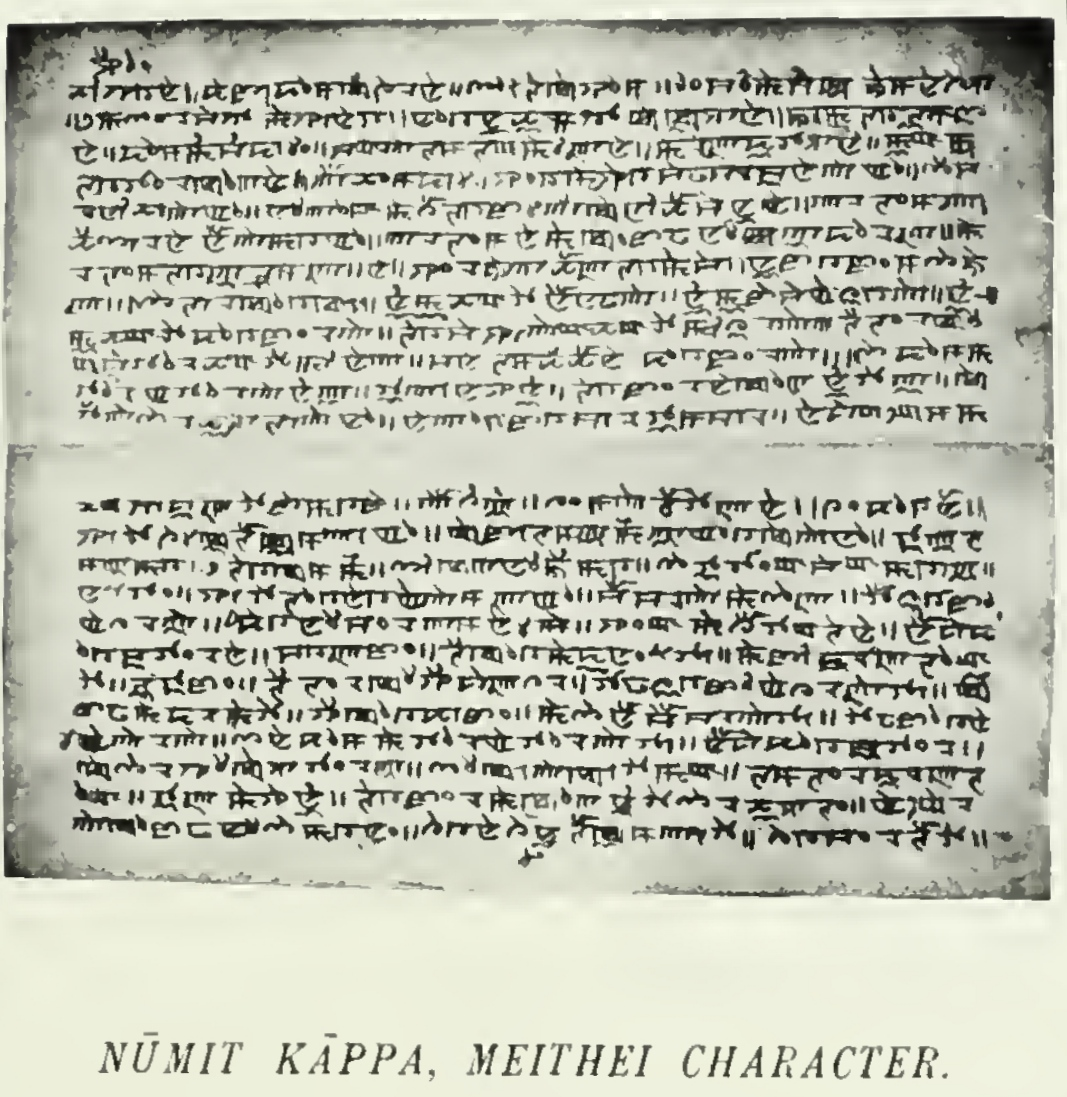
- An illustration of the ancient Meitei language narrative work Numit Kappa (Meitei for 'Shooting at the Sun')
- Cultural origins: Meitei culture

Subgenres
- Moirang Saion

Related genres
- Meitei folklore; Meitei folktales; Meitei mythology; traditional Meitei religion

Ancient Meitei literature, also termed as Old Manipuri literature, is literature written in the Old Manipuri language from the 1st century CE until the time of King Pamheiba (Meitei for 'Garib Niwaj'). All the ancient Meitei language text written in the traditional Meitei script are conventionally termed as "the puyas". Many of these literary works need transliteration and translation, as the language used is often "obscure and unintelligible" to the modern Manipuri.

== Overview ==
Ougri (Meitei: ꯑꯧꯒ꯭ꯔꯤ), an Old Manipuri ritual song, was composed during the 1st century CE, and was sung mostly for the "destruction and ruination and also for prosperity" of the ancient Meitei society. Many scholars commented that this musical work existed even before the beginning of the Common Era.

The Poireiton Khunthok is a 3rd-century ancient Meitei language literary work, which is a narrative of a historical colonisation of the valley by a group of people, led by Poireiton, in an area between the Langgol Hills and the Koubru mountains.

The Khencho (Meitei: ꯈꯦꯟꯆꯣ), another poetic work, was composed before the end of the 7th century CE.

Traditionally attributed to author Akoijam Tombi, during the reign of Meitei King Khongtekcha Yoiremba in c. 763 CE, the Pānthoibī Khōnggūl (Meitei: ꯄꯥꯟꯊꯣꯢꯕꯤ ꯈꯣꯡꯒꯨꯜ, lit. 'in quest of Panthoibi, Panthoibi's footprint') narrates the adventures of lady Panthoibi and her lover Nongpok Ningthou.

In 1100 CE, the Loyumba Shinyen (Meitei: ꯂꯣꯌꯨꯝꯄ ꯁꯤꯟꯌꯦꯟ), a written constitution was finalised and under the patronage of Meitei King Loiyumba (1074 CE-1112 CE) of the Ancient Kangleipak. It was a formal declaration of the proto-constitution which was first drafted in 429 CE by King Naophangba.

== Notable literary works ==
=== Literary and poetic works ===
- Chengleiron (Meitei: ꯆꯦꯡꯂꯩꯔꯣꯟ, lit. 'narrative of the Chenglei clan'). Legend of Chingjen Nāran Pānganbā, king of the Chengleis
- Hijan Hirao (Meitei: ꯍꯤꯖꯟ ꯍꯤꯔꯥꯎ), a long narrative poem.
- Khongchomnupi Nongkalol (Meitei: ꯈꯣꯡꯆꯣꯝꯅꯨꯄꯤ ꯅꯣꯡꯀꯥꯂꯣꯜ). An allegorical description of how the Pleiades and Orion took their places in the sky and how Khurkhul was named.
- Numit Kappa (Meitei: ꯅꯨꯃꯤꯠ ꯀꯥꯞꯄ, lit. 'the shooting down of the sun'). An epic in which the hero, Khwai Nungjeng Piba, shoots Taothuireng, one of the two Sun gods, in order to create the night.
- Nungpan Ponpi Luwaopa, (Meitei: ꯅꯨꯡꯄꯥꯟ ꯄꯣꯟꯄꯤ ꯂꯨꯋꯥꯎꯄ). An epic in which Nungpan Ponpi Luwaopa, prince of the Luwang, wins the back the life of his wife Koubaron Namoinu from Thongalen, the God of death.
- Panthoibi Naheirol (Meitei: ꯄꯥꯟꯊꯣꯏꯕꯤ ꯅꯥꯍꯩꯔꯣꯜ). the story of the passion of thegoddess Panthoibi for her lover Nongpok Ningthou.
- Poireiton Khunthok (Meitei: ꯄꯣꯏꯔꯩꯇꯣꯟ ꯈꯨꯟꯊꯣꯛ). Story of the settlement of a valley near Langol Hill by a band of people from the land of Death led by Poireiton.
- Salkao (Meitei: ꯁꯜꯀꯥꯎ, lit. 'male ox'). Records of seven fights between bulls owned by members of the elite.
- Tharon (Meitei: ꯊꯥꯔꯣꯟ, lit. 'lore of months'), apoetic account of the twelve lunar months of a year.
- Yakeiron (Meitei: ꯌꯥꯀꯩꯔꯣꯟ), a poetry collection.

=== Government and administration ===
- Laisra Pham ((Meitei: ꯂꯥꯏꯁ꯭ꯔꯥ ꯐꯝ)}, a treatise on administration and social conduct.
- Loyumba Sinyen (Meitei: ꯂꯣꯌꯨꯝꯕ ꯁꯤꯟꯌꯦꯟ) Constitution of King Loyumbā (1074–1112CE). it defines rules and regulations for the King, his nobles, and the people codified from traditional systems.

=== Natural science ===
- Leiron (Meitei: ꯂꯩꯔꯣꯟ, lit. 'account of flowers'), a rhythmic and musical descriptions of 100 flowers known to the Meitei people.
- Yenlon (Meitei: ꯌꯦꯟꯂꯣꯟ, lit. 'account of herbs'), a description of 66 herbs used by the Meiteis in foods and medicine.

=== History and geography ===
- Langkol Chingkoipa (Meitei: ꯂꯥꯡꯀꯣꯜ ꯆꯤꯡꯀꯣꯏꯄ, lit. 'Account of the Langgol hills'), description and praise of the extensive Langgol hills.
- Naothingkhong Phambal Kaba (Meitei: ꯅꯥꯎꯊꯤꯡꯈꯣꯡ ꯐꯝꯕꯥꯜ ꯀꯥꯕ), a historical tragedy based on the life of life of Prince Hongnemyoi Khunjāo until his accession to the Meitei throne as Nāothingkhong in 663 A.D.
- Nongmaiching Chingkoipa (Meitei: ꯅꯣꯡꯃꯥꯏꯆꯤꯡ ꯆꯤꯡꯀꯣꯏꯄ, lit. 'Account of Nongmaiching mountains'), a description of a number of cliffs, slopes and adjacent locations in the Nongmaiching Ching.
- Chainarol (Meitei: ꯆꯥꯏꯅꯔꯣꯜ, lit. 'An Account of Combats'), a collection of 27 stories of warfare among the clans.
- Tutenglon (Meitei: ꯇꯨꯇꯦꯡꯂꯣꯟ, lit. 'dredging the channels of rivers'), a heroic account of two Meitei royal brothers, Yoimongbā and Tāothingmāng, who take on the colossal task of dredging the channels of the rivers in Manipur, the Iril and the Imphal.
- Toreirol Lambuba (Meitei: ꯇꯣꯔꯩꯔꯣꯜ ꯂꯝꯕꯨꯕ, lit. 'An account of toponyms of places in riverbanks')- describes how places, particularly those located on the banks of meandering rivers, got their names.
- Thawanthaba Hiran (Meitei: ꯊꯋꯥꯟꯊꯥꯕ ꯍꯤꯔꯥꯟ) a historical tragedy of crime of passion in the court of King Thawānthābā, (1195–1231).

=== Royal chronicles ===
- Khuman Kangleirol (Meitei: ꯈꯨꯃꯟ ꯀꯪꯂꯩꯔꯣꯜ), ā royal chronicle of Khuman Salai.
- Ningthourol Lambuba (Meitei: ꯅꯤꯡꯊꯧꯔꯣꯜ ꯂꯝꯕꯨꯕ)
- Chada Laihui (Meitei: ꯆꯥꯗꯥ ꯂꯥꯏꯍꯨꯏ), a matrilineal genealogy of the Meitei kings, beginning with Chākhā Nuron Piron Yāmbi, mother of Nongdā Lāiren Pākhangba
- Moirang Ningthourol Lambuba (Meitei: ꯃꯣꯏꯔꯥꯡ ꯅꯤꯡꯊꯧꯔꯣꯜ ꯂꯝꯕꯨꯕ), a poetic account of the Moirāng kings.

=== Scripture and religious works ===
- Sanamahi Laihui (Meitei: ꯁꯅꯥꯃꯍꯤ ꯂꯥꯏꯍꯨꯏ)
- Panthoibi Khonggul (Meitei: ꯄꯥꯟꯊꯣꯏꯕꯤ ꯈꯣꯡꯒꯨꯜ)
- Pakhangba Laihui (Meitei: ꯄꯥꯈꯪꯕ ꯂꯥꯏꯍꯨꯏ)
- Nongsaba Laihui (Meitei: ꯅꯣꯡꯁꯥꯕ ꯂꯥꯏꯍꯨꯏ)

=== Songs ===
- Ahonglon (Meitei: ꯑꯍꯣꯡꯂꯣꯟ), joyous ritual song of Royal festivals dating back to at least the 11th century. Mentioned in the Loyumbā Sinyen.
- Anoirol (Meitei: ꯑꯅꯣꯏꯔꯣꯜ), a long song accompanied by the penā in that describes the evolution of dance.
- Apoklon (Meitei: ꯑꯄꯣꯛꯂꯣꯟ) hymns to the creator, Apopka.
- Khencho (Meitei: ꯈꯦꯟꯆꯣ) religious song or poem.
- Kumdamsei (Meitei: ꯀꯨꯝꯗꯝꯁꯩ) ritual song that ushers in a new season.
- Lairemma Paosa (Meitei: ꯂꯥꯏꯔꯦꯝꯃ ꯄꯥꯎꯁꯥ), religious song or poem.
- Loutā Eesei (Meitei: ꯂꯧꯇꯥ ꯏꯁꯩ), hymn sung before ploughing begins, prayer for a bountiful harvest.
- Langmeilon (Meitei: ꯂꯪꯃꯥꯏꯂꯣꯟ), sung to celebrate a King's victory or coronation. connected with the celebration of the king's victory or of his coronation.
- Mei (Meitei: ꯃꯩ) hymn to the fire god.
- Ougri (Meitei: ꯑꯧꯒ꯭ꯔꯤ), very old ritual song, sung at the coronation of Nongdā Lāiren Pākhangbā in 33 A.D.
- Pakhangba Langyensei (Meitei: ꯄꯥꯈꯪꯕ ꯂꯥꯡꯌꯦꯟꯁꯩ), ritual song, coronation ceremonial poetry, philosophical riddles.
- Phoukouron (Meitei: ꯐꯧꯀꯧꯔꯣꯟ), hymn to Phouoibi, goddess of crops.
- Sana, Lamok (Meitei: ꯁꯅꯥ ꯂꯝꯑꯣꯛ, lit. 'royal welcome'), ā hymn to Pākhangbā, one of the presiding deities of the Meitei community.
- Yakeiba (Meitei: ꯌꯥꯀꯩꯕꯥ) ritual song.

== Translations and literary adaptations to modern Meitei ==
Many scholars and writers, including M. Chandra Singh, Ningthoukhongjam Khelchandra and O. Bogheswor, have dedicated their lives in the translations, literary adaptations and restorations of ancient Meitei literary works. The contributions of this group of people make the new generations of readers aware of the essence and values of the old literature. In addition to them, the Manipuri Sahitya Parishad published books of old literature along with the modern versions.

== Significance in modern times ==
The Civil Services Examination (CSE), conducted by the Union Public Service Commission (UPSC), for the recruitment of the bureaucrat civil services of the Government of India, offers its aspirant candidates across the entire country an optional subject of Meitei literature.

== See also ==
- Ancient Greek literature
- Meitei classical language movement
- Meitei culture
- Meitei folklore
- Meitei folktales
- Meitei inscriptions
- Meitei linguistic purism movement
- Meitei mythology
- Meitei proverbs
- Meitei religion
