= List of figures in Meitei mythology =

This is a list of gods, goddesses, people and other figures from Meitei mythology. They are sorted into sections below. The immortals include gods, spirits and other supernatural beings. Being immortal means that they lived forever. The mortals include heroes, kings and other people.

The tableau of Manipur, depicting the Meitei mythological figures, in the Republic Day Parade of India in New Delhi

== Immortals ==
- Atingkok (ꯑꯇꯤꯡꯀꯣꯛ), the Universal God Father, the Creator of the entire world.
- Haoreima (ꯍꯥꯎꯔꯩꯃ), a female divinity, in the form of a tribal woman, carrying traditional elongated basket.
- Hellois (ꯍꯦꯜꯂꯣꯢ), the supernatural female divinities, who are known for their charm and seduction.
- Imoinu (ꯏꯃꯣꯢꯅꯨ), a household goddess of hearth fire, wealth and prosperity.
- Ireima (ꯏꯔꯩꯃ), the goddess and the Queen of the water realm.
- Khamlangba (ꯈꯝꯂꯥꯡꯕ), a great hunter, warrior and miner deity.
- Khoriphaba (ꯈꯣꯔꯤꯐꯥꯕ), the only son of Atingkok and Konthoujam Tampha Lairembi.
- Khuman Apokpa (ꯈꯨꯃꯟ ꯑꯄꯣꯛꯄ), the God of Darkness, and the progenitor of the Khuman clan.
- Koiren Leima (ꯀꯣꯢꯔꯦꯟ ꯂꯩꯃ), the dual goddesses, who are both the consorts of Thangjing.
- Konthoujam Tampha Lairembi (ꯀꯣꯟꯊꯧꯖꯝ ꯇꯝꯐꯥ ꯂꯥꯢꯔꯦꯝꯕꯤ), the former Queen of Heaven and a consort of Atingkok, the Supreme God.
- Korouhanba (ꯀꯣꯔꯧꯍꯟꯕ), the God of the Sun and the master of the sky.
- Koupalu (ꯀꯧꯕ꯭ꯔꯨ), the guardian of the North West direction and the presiding deity of the Mt. Koubru.
- Laikhurembi (ꯂꯥꯢꯈꯨꯔꯦꯝꯕꯤ), the chief Queen of Thongalel, the ruler of the underworld kingdom.
- Lainaotabi (ꯂꯥꯢꯅꯥꯎꯇꯥꯕꯤ), the youngest consort of Thongalel, and the goddess of sorcery, witchcraft and weaving.
- Leimarel Sidabi (ꯂꯩꯃꯔꯦꯜ ꯁꯤꯗꯕꯤ), the supreme mother earth goddess.
- Loyalakpa (ꯂꯣꯌꯥꯂꯥꯛꯄ), the only son of Koupalu and Kounu.
- Marjing (ꯃꯥꯔꯖꯤꯡ), the god of polo, horses, war and sports.
- Mongba Hanba (ꯃꯣꯡꯕ ꯍꯟꯕ), a primordial Sylvan God.
- Ngaleima (ꯉꯥꯂꯩꯃ), the goddess of fish, and a sister of Ireima, Phouoibi and Thumleima.
- Nongshaba, also known as Kanglasha, a dragon lion god, son of Atingkok.
- Nongthang Leima (ꯅꯣꯡꯊꯥꯡ ꯂꯩꯃ), the goddess of seduction, associated with thunder and lightning.
- Pakhangpa (ꯄꯥꯈꯪꯄ), a primordial serpentine dragon and a son of Atingkok and Leimarel Sidabi.
- Panam Ningthou (ꯄꯅꯝ ꯅꯤꯡꯊꯧ), the presiding god of "Andro village" in Manipur.
- Panthoibi (ꯄꯥꯟꯊꯣꯢꯕꯤ), the goddess of fertility, war and love.
- Phouoibi (ꯐꯧꯑꯣꯢꯕꯤ), the goddess of food, crops and agriculture.
- Poireiton (ꯄꯣꯢꯔꯩꯇꯣꯟ), the cultural hero, who brought fire from the underworld to the human world.
- Pureiromba (ꯄꯨꯔꯩꯔꯣꯝꯕ), an ancestral deity of the Angom clan.
- Sanamahi (ꯁꯅꯥꯃꯍꯤ), a household deity and the eldest son of Atingkok, the Supreme deity.
- Taoroinai (ꯇꯥꯎꯔꯣꯢꯅꯥꯢ), a primordial celestial serpentine dragon, who abodes in the cosmic ocean.
- Thangjing (ꯊꯥꯡꯖꯤꯡ), the progenitor of the Moirang clan, the Guardian of the South West direction and the presiding deity of Ancient Moirang.
- Thongalel (ꯊꯣꯉꯥꯂꯦꯜ), the god of the death and the ruler of the underworld.
- Thumleima (ꯊꯨꯝꯂꯩꯃ), the goddess of salt and salt brines.
- Wangbren (ꯋꯥꯡꯕ꯭ꯔꯦꯟ), the god of water, rain, flood, disease and sickness.
- Yumjao Leima (ꯌꯨꯝꯖꯥꯎ ꯂꯩꯃ), the goddess of household and royalty.

== Mortals ==
=== Heroes ===
- Akongjamba (ꯑꯀꯣꯡꯖꯥꯝꯕ), a handsome nobleman in the court of the king of Ancient Moirang.
- Henjunaha (ꯍꯦꯟꯖꯨꯅꯍꯥ), an orphan lad, brought up by his mother, and a lover of Lairoulembi.
- Kadeng Thangjahanba (ꯀꯗꯦꯡ ꯊꯥꯡꯖꯍꯟꯕ), a matchless blacksmith and a lover of Tonu Laijinglembi, in Ancient Moirang.
- Khuman Khamba (ꯈꯨꯃꯟ ꯈꯝꯕ), an orphan prince, of the Khuman dynasty, brought up by his sister, Khamnu.
- Khuyol Haoba (ꯈꯨꯌꯣꯜ ꯍꯥꯎꯕ), an orphan son of Khuyol Khuntoulempa, and a lover of Yaithing Konu, in Ancient Moirang.

=== Notable women ===
- Moirang Thoibi (ꯃꯣꯢꯔꯥꯡ ꯊꯣꯢꯕꯤ, ꯃꯣꯏꯔꯥꯡ ꯊꯣꯏꯕꯤ), princess of Ancient Moirang, and a lady love of Khuman Khamba. Later, she committed suicide after killing her beloved.
- Tonu Laijinglembi (ꯇꯣꯅꯨ ꯂꯥꯢꯖꯤꯡꯂꯦꯝꯕꯤ), a lady love of Kadeng Thangjahanba from Ancient Moirang.

== Related pages ==
- Meitei deities
- List of creatures in Meitei folklore
- Umang Lai
