= Phouoibi (disambiguation) =

Phouoibi or Phouoipi may refer to:

- Phouoibi, the Meitei goddess of bounty
- Phouoibi Waron, medieval Indian Meitei-language text
- Phouoibi Shayon, a 2017 Indian Meitei-language mythological film
- Phou-oibi, the rice goddess, a 2013 Indian Meitei-language ballad opera
