= Pākhangbā =

Primordial god in Meitei mythology

Pakhangba
- Member of Meitei dragons
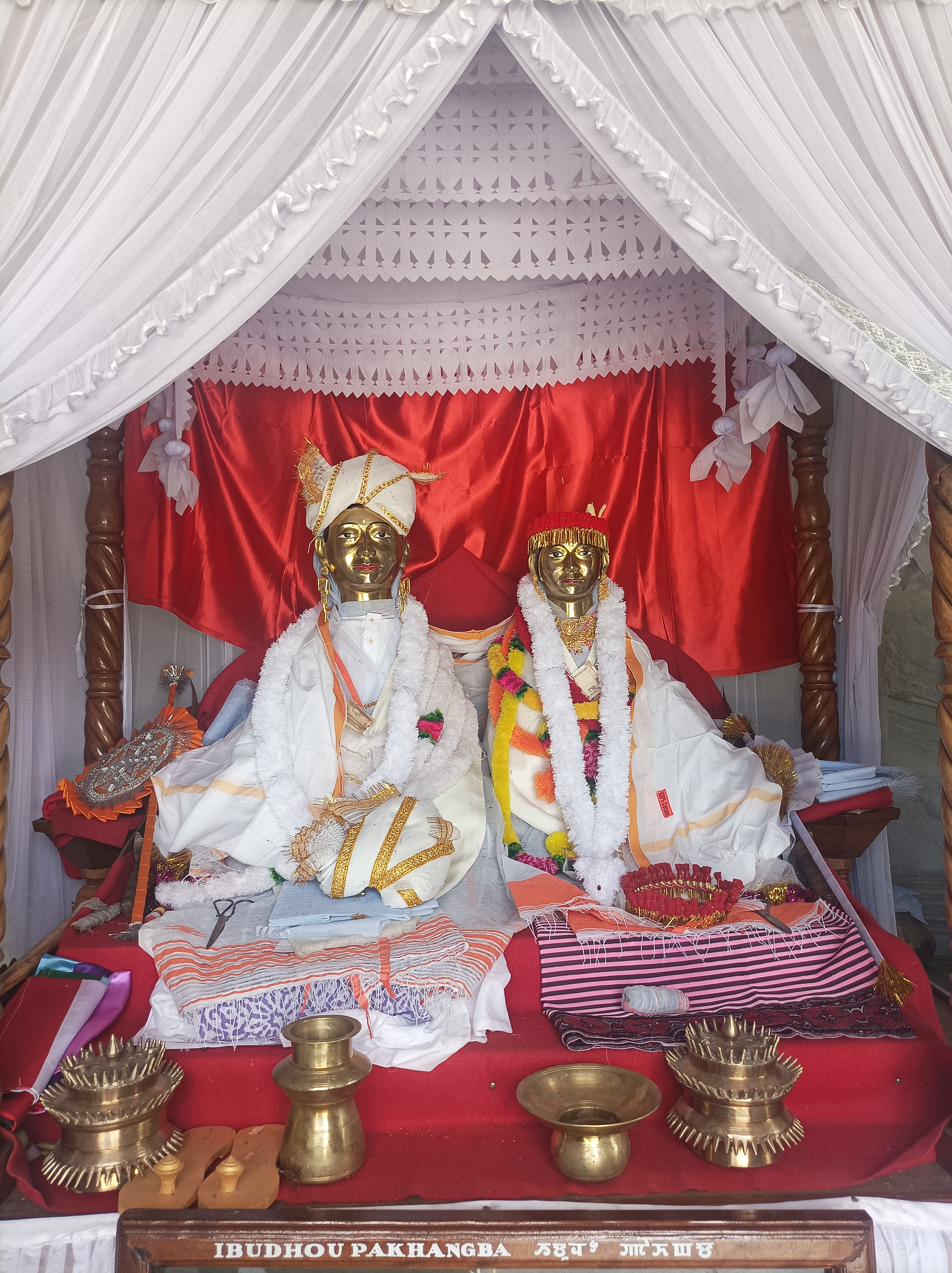
- Idols of Pakhangba and his consort in the Pakhangba Temple, Kangla.
- Affiliation: Sanamahism
- Major cult center: Pakhangba Temple, Kangla
- Abode: heaven and earth
- Symbol: Meitei dragons
- Texts: Wakoklon Heelel Thilel Salai Amailon Pukok; Leishemlon; Leithak Leikharol; Sakok Lamlen
- Gender: Male
- Region: Ancient Kangleipak
- Ethnic group: Meitei
- Festivals: Lai Haraoba

Genealogy
- Parents: Salailen (father); Leimarel Sidabi (mother)
- Siblings: Lainingthou Sanamahi, Irai Leima, Khoriphaba, Khunu Leima, Ngaleima, Nganu Leima, Nongshaba, Nongthang Leima, Phouleima (Phouoibi), Shapi Leima, Thumleima
- Consort: Nongthang Leima
- Children: Mangang, Luwang, Khuman Salai, and others (or Salai Taret Apokpas)

Equivalents
- Greek: Typhon

Pakhangba (Meitei: ꯄꯥꯈꯪꯕ, lit. 'the one who knows his father') is a primordial deity, often represented in the form of a dragon, in Meitei mythology and Sanamahism, the indigenous religion of Manipur. He is depicted in the heraldry of the Manipur kingdom, which originated in paphal (Meitei: ꯄꯥꯐꯜ), mythical illustrations of the deity. It is believed that the ancestor of one of the Meitei clans manifested himself as the Pakhangba.

The identity of the deity is often fused with Nongda Lairen Pakhangba, the first ruler of the Ningthouja dynasty. The title Pakhangba was also used by other kings in the history of Manipur.

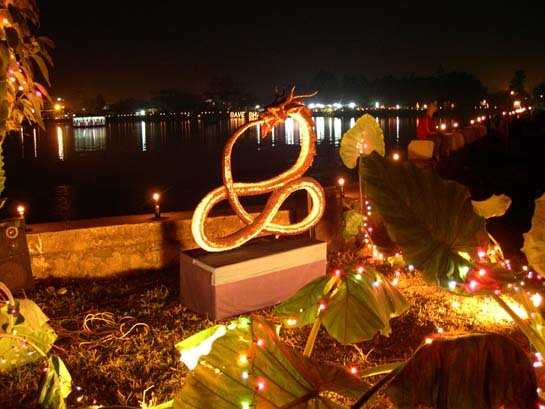
Pakhangba statue

== Mythology ==
Pakhangba and his elder brother Sanamahi were told by their father that the one who could circumambulate the universe seven times and reach him first would be given the throne of the universe. Sanamahi set out immediately. Pakhangba, besides being the younger brother, was less strong. His mother Leimarel Sidabi, said that circling his father's throne is equivalent to the circling of the entire universe. So, he circled the throne, and his father was satisfied with Pakhangba's knowledge. So, Pakhangba was given his name, which means "one who has realised his father," and was enthroned.

== Iconography ==
Pakhangba is depicted as a serpent with the antlers of a sangai, or brow-antlered deer, signifying the cultural synthesis of two different totemic belief systems, which are the worship of serpents and stags.

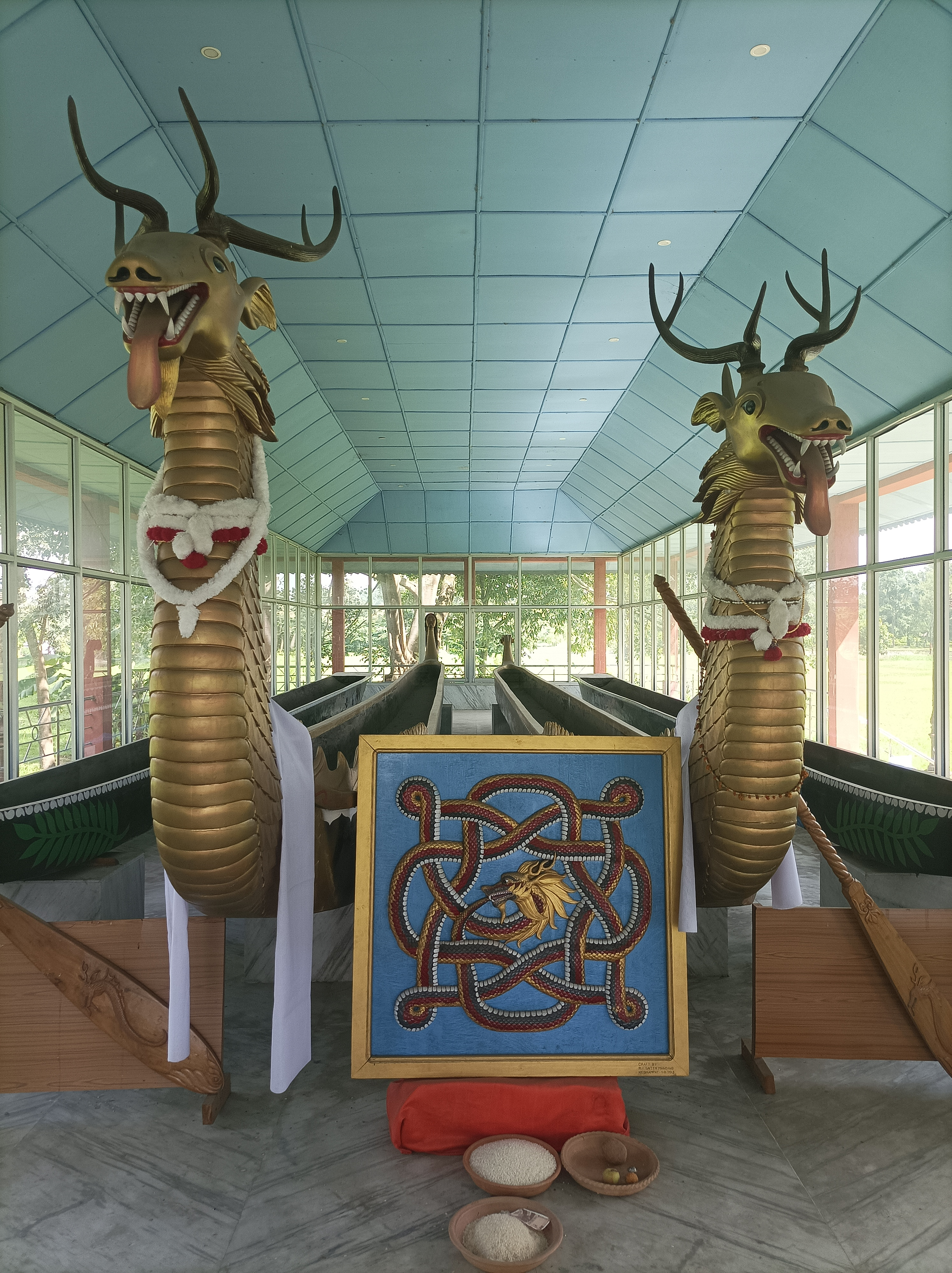
Two Meitei Hiyang hiren, or royal boats, in the shape of Pakhangba inside the Hijagang (Meitei for 'Boatyard') in the Kangla Fort in Imphal

Serpents are the totem creatures of the Ningthouja clan. Ningthoujas do not consume any fishes or plants that look like serpents, as a mark of respect for their ancestors. The Sangai is associated with the Luwang clan. The Chakpa people, who are a part of the Meitei community, also regard deer as their totem animals.

According to legend, Pudangkoi Khutkoiba, a king of the Luwangs, was once transformed into a deer. He was inadvertently killed by his own younger brother, who didn't know his true identity. Once the error was recognised, the head and antlers of the deer were brought into and preserved in the royal palace. For the inauguration of a royal boat of a Luwang king, the preserved horned head was decoratively installed on the stern. After the cultural integration of the Luwangs and the Meiteis, this tradition was integrated into the making of Meitei hiyang hiren (Meitei for 'royal boats'). Simultaneously, the sides of the boat are decorated to resemble the body of serpentine dragon, thereby looking like the features of deity Pakhangba.

In the post-Khagemba era, representations of Pakhangba in the form of a paphal (a coiled serpent or dragon biting its own tail, similar to an ouroboros became prominent.

=== In Meitei architecture ===
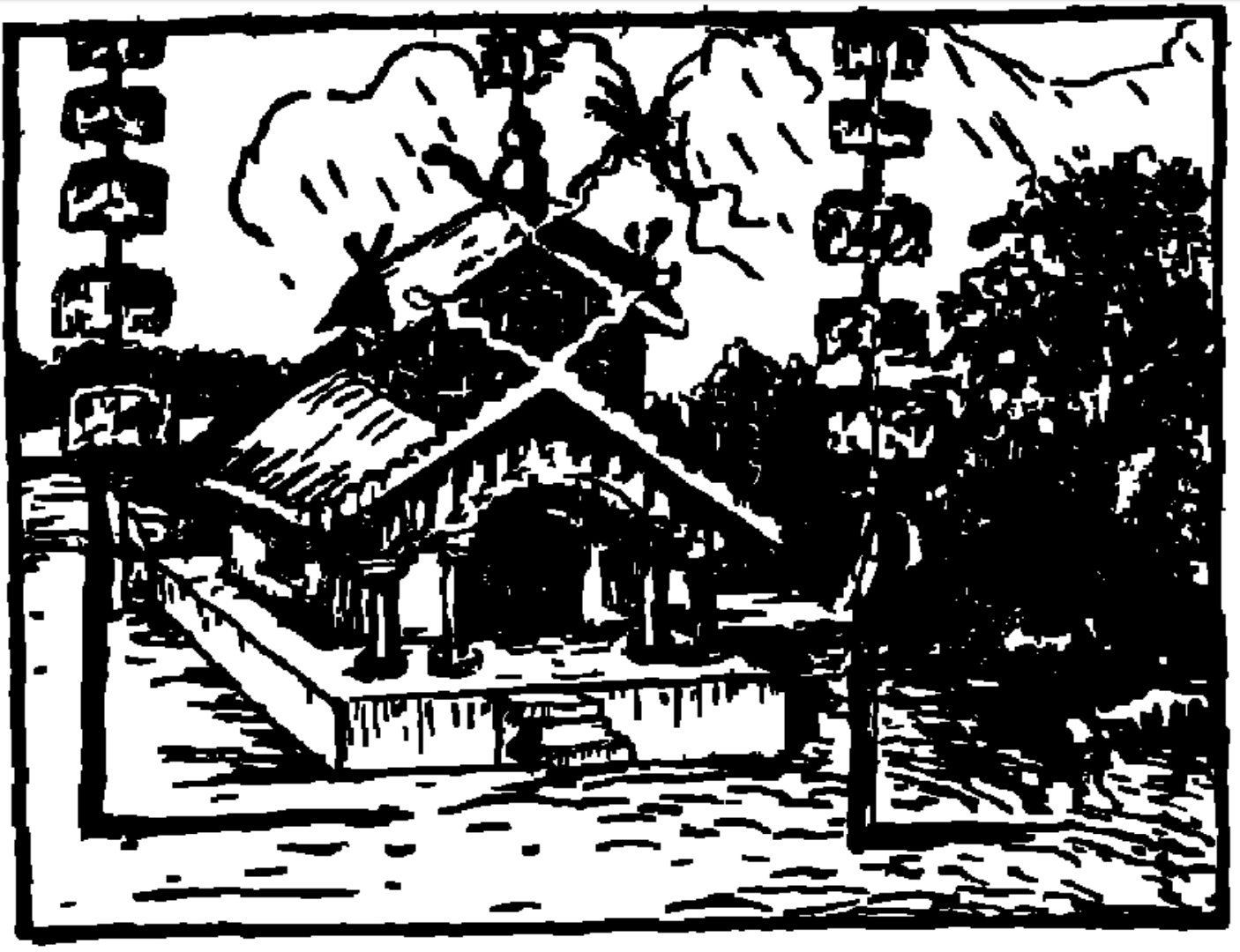
An illustration of a traditional building based on Meitei architecture, highlighting the Chirong, a sacred symbol for the antlers of deity Pakhangba

In traditional Meitei architecture, the most important Meitei cultural element in building a house is the decoration for the front roof with a design resembling a deer's antlers (Meitei: Chirong). Chi (Meitei for 'horn') is derived from the word Machi (Meitei for 'antler'), and rong (Meitei for 'branching') is derived from the word rongba (Meitei for 'posterior directed branch'). The Chirong symbolises the antler premeditated on his head of the deity Pakhangba.

== Beliefs ==
In relation to Pakhangba, Meitei language has two commonly used words to refer to the snakes or serpents. The words are "lin" and "lairen". Lin is used to refer to small snakes, usually the poisonous snakes. On the other hand, "Lairen" is used to refer to the large snakes, usually the pythons, as well as any big mythical snakes.

Whenever anyone encounters a snake, they may attribute it to the "lin" or "lairen" or any other honorifics dedicated to divine serpents. Sometimes, they simply attribute it to the gods, or directly to Pakhangba.

Pythons are related to Pakhangba in the world of charms and fortunes. Many people claim that their lives have changed in dramatic ways after encountering a pythons (or Pakhangba).

There are some people who believe in the millenarian return of Pakhangba. According to their beliefs, Pakhangba will re-unite the people of the plains and the hills of Manipur, both politically and religiously, ending decades of tension and violent insurgency.

== Cult ==
The cult of Pakhangba extraordinarily has an ability to integrate different deities. There are numerous deities, whose names are sufficed with the word "Pakhangba", starting from cosmological deities to ancestral deities. Notable ones are Nongda Lairen Pakhangba, Tangja Leela Pakhangba, Leinung Loncha Pakhangba, Saram Tangkhul Pakhangba, Loidam Thaja Pakhangba and Laiyingthou Pakhangba.

=== Deified Meitei kings ===
Since ancient times, rulers of Kangleipak were deified and worshipped as Pakhangba or one of his divine forms. Similarly, historical queens were deified and integrated into the cult of Yumjao Lairembi. In the Thangmeiband region, Meitei king Naothingkhong (c. 5th century CE) is worshipped as Naothingkhong Pakhangba. Another King, Khagemba is also worshipped as a form of Pakhangba.

=== Tangkhul deities ===
Saram Tangkhul Pakhangba and his wife, Saram Tangkhul Nurabi are associated with the Tangkhul people of north eastern parts of Manipur. The Tangkhul deities were given a prominent position in the Umang Lai pantheon of the Meitei people. Besides being identified as a form of deity Pakhangba, in some cases, Saram Tangkhul is also identified with Nongpok Ningthou.

== Consorts ==
Pakhangba has numerous consorts, belonging to different communities and ethnicities.

One legend of Pakhangba says that he has seven wives, who give birth to the seven Meitei clans. It signifies the integration of different communities and ethnicities into one single nation.

Lady Liksanu Saphabi belonging to Kabui people and Thangal people, lady Khamlang Taobi belonging to Chothe people, lady Chotenu belonging to Kom people and lady Leiyoi Nurabi belonging to Langmeidong are a few of the numerous consorts of the Meitei deity Pakhangba. Lady Saram Tangkhul Nurabi is the consort of Tangkhul Pakhangba, a Tangkhul deity, who is a divine form of Pakhangba.

== Texts ==
Pakhangba is mentioned in numerous ancient Meitei language texts, including the Thanglon Thangchat, the Pakhangba Laihui, the Pakhangba Phambal, the "Pakhangba Naoyom", the "Pakhangba Nongkarol", etc.

== In heraldry ==
Pakhangba, as a heraldic dragon, was present in all the former royal flags and coats of arms of Manipur. The kingdom of Manipur had a set of two flags, a white one and a red one. All featured the Pakhangba dragon in the centre, although not as prominently in the latter flags.

== In traditional dance and music ==
Keiyen is an ancient Meitei language song describing the conflict between Pakhangba (Apanba) and his elder brother Sanamahi (Asheeba), as a conflict between a tiger and a cock respectively, having mythological and symbolic importance to the Meitei culture. It is symbolically represented in the Ke-kre-Chongba performance.

Younger brother Pakhangba's attempt to escape, along with his seven goddesses, from the elder brother Sanamahi is depicted in the song. (Note: Singh, 1993b, p. 72)

Its interpretation by the different minstrels, maibas and maibis, have many variations. Metaphorically, the song is about a cock (Pakhangba) being pursued by a tiger (Sanamahi).

In Ancient Meitei language, a tiger is termed as “Kei”. “Yangen” is a name of a small wild bushy shrub plant. “Shamba” means “to traverse” in Meitei. “Shyao Shyao” refers to the ancient Meitei onomatopoeic word for the sound produced while traversing the bushy way by the tiger. “Yengkhong Phate” refers to the ominous sound of the cock. It implies that Pakhangba's deeds are not good and so, he deserves to be devoured as a punishment. But, that very cock is not an ordinary one, as it belongs to Lai (Meitei for 'God'). The last line indicates that the entire actions of everyone are done as a divine will of God, thereby showing the ultimate power of the Almighty God and his process of the creation of the entire universe.

The Meitei philosophy associated with Keiyen is imbibed in the dances performed in the Lai Haraoba. Later, it gradually evolved into present day dance of the Thabal Chongba.

== Festivals ==
=== Lai Haraoba ===
Pakhangba, being considered as one of the Umang Lai deities, is honoured with the celebration of the Lai Haraoba festival by the Meitei people.

=== Pakhangba Cheng Hongba ===
Pakhangba Cheng Hongba is a traditional Meitei religious festival celebrated annually in honour of deity Pakhangba, to bring peace and tranquility among mankind. One of the most notable celebrations is organised by the Utra Shanglen Sana Konung and the Pacha Loishang by offering flowers to Nongshaba, Pakhangba and Yumjao Lairembi. This festival is celebrated on a regular basis in the Sana Konung, widely believed to be organised since the era of King Nongda Lairen Pakhangba.

It has been the cultural institute Atinga has participated since 2017.

== In politics ==
In 1992, Meitei King Okendrajit Singh, the then ruler of Manipur Kingdom, converted from Hinduism to Sanamahism, the traditional Meitei religion to become a revivalist.

In 2020, Leisemba Sanajaoba, the son of the former king Okendrajit, took oath of joining as an MP inside the Rajya Sabha on behalf of the Bharatiya Janata Party (BJP), mentioning the name of deity Pakhangba, besides Sanamahi and Govindajee (Krishna).

The state administrative office of Bharatiya Janata Party (BJP) in Imphal houses a shrine dedicated to the deity Pakhangba. The BJP-ruled state government of Manipur developed the sacred sites of Pakhangba and performed rituals in the Kangla. Other opposition political parties are also seen in engaging religious activities in relation to deity Pakhangba.

During his 2019 Parliamentary election campaign, Kaiku Rajkumar, a renowned politician-turned actor of Meitei cinema, visited the Pakhangba Temple, Kangla and publicly performed laibau chenba (Meitei for 'ritual divination').

== Outside Manipur ==
=== Bangladesh ===
A temple dedicated to Pakhangba was constructed during the time of Maharaja Gambhir Singh, in the Sylhet Division of Bangladesh. The temple is 24m tall and raised a further 90 cm on a 15 by 37m brick platform, which it shares with temples dedicated to Yumjao Lairembi and Lainingthou Nongasaba. It has a steep conical roof and is decorated with bas relief carvings of a peacock, moon and sun on the upper part of its entrance door. The eastern wall is carved with images of the moon, a horse and a cow.

=== Myanmar ===
There are a few shrines dedicated to Pakhangba in Myanmar. One notable example is found in the village of Tadalel, Amarapura township, Mandalay Division. In 2023, the Mandalay-based Myanmar Meitei Development Association requested help with the protection and preservation of the site from Nongthombam Biren, the then Chief Minister of Manipur, to give assistance for the preservation and protection of the holy site.

=== Tripura ===
A temple dedicated to deity Pakhangba was built during the coronation of Tripuri King Radha Kishore Manikya, highlighting the influence of Meitei queens, including both the mother and the wife of King Radha, on the Kingdom of Tripura.

During the reign of the Meitei king Marjit Singh, Raja Borothakur Krishna Kishore ruled in Tripura. The first queen was Sija Chandrakala Devi, a Meitei princess and the second, known as Bamon Leima was a Meitei Brahmin. Meitei culture flourished in Tripura, with the proliferation of cults dedicated to different Meitei deities in the region of Bonmalipur.

Pakhangba is still worshipped in the Pakhangba Temple, located near the Royal Palace of Tripura.

== In popular culture ==
In the 2018 edition of the Sangai festival held in Manipur, twenty artistes, standing and dancing in the form of a human chain, presented a lively 30 metres long image of deity Pakhangba, dancing on the stage for 45 minutes, depicting the origin of the human beings, as adapted from the Lai Haraoba festival performances, while presenting a theatrical show titled Laigi Machasing (Meitei for 'Children of God'), choreographed by Sangeet Natak Akademi's Ustad Bismillah Khan Yuva Puraskar Awardee Sinam Basu.

A Mumbai-based group of musical artists titled "Serpents of Pakhangba", named after the deity Pakhangba himself, formed in 2019, is continuously producing musical works related to Meitei mythology and Meitei folklore.

== See also ==
- Lists of deities in Sanamahism
- Dragons in Manipuri mythology
- History of Manipur
- Kangla Palace
- Ningthouja dynasty

== Bibliography ==
- Pakhangba Phamlup (in Manipuri). India: Publications Divisions Reforms, Imphal. 2009.
- Chaoba, Kangbam (1985). Pakhangba Naoyom (in Manipuri). Digital Library of India.
- Bheigya Singh, Yengkhom (1985). Pakhangba (in Manipuri). Digital Library of India.
- Kala Meitei, Pukhrambam. Pakhangba (in Manipuri). Digital Library of India.
- Ibobi, laikhuram (1995). Pakhangba Laining (in Manipuri). Digital Library of India.
- Bihari Singh, Huirem (2012). Chothe Thangwai Pakhangba (in Manipuri). Digital Library of India.
- Kokngangsana, Rajkumar (1955). Kanglei Langba Pakhangba (in Manipuri). Ningthou Macha Manisana Heirangkhoithong Keibung Imphal.
- Ngamba, Chongthamcha (1989). Mapugee Matik Mayai (in Manipuri).
- Khwairakpam, Biren; Chingakham, Dinachandra (8 October 2018). The Lai of Manipur: Andro and Sengmai. Independently Published. ISBN 978-1-7266-9002-7.
- Parratt, John (2017). The Coils of Pakhangba: A Culture History of Meeteis. Mittal Publications. ISBN 978-81-8324-823-5.
