= Nongshāba =

Lion God of Manipur

Nongshaba
- Member of Umang Lais
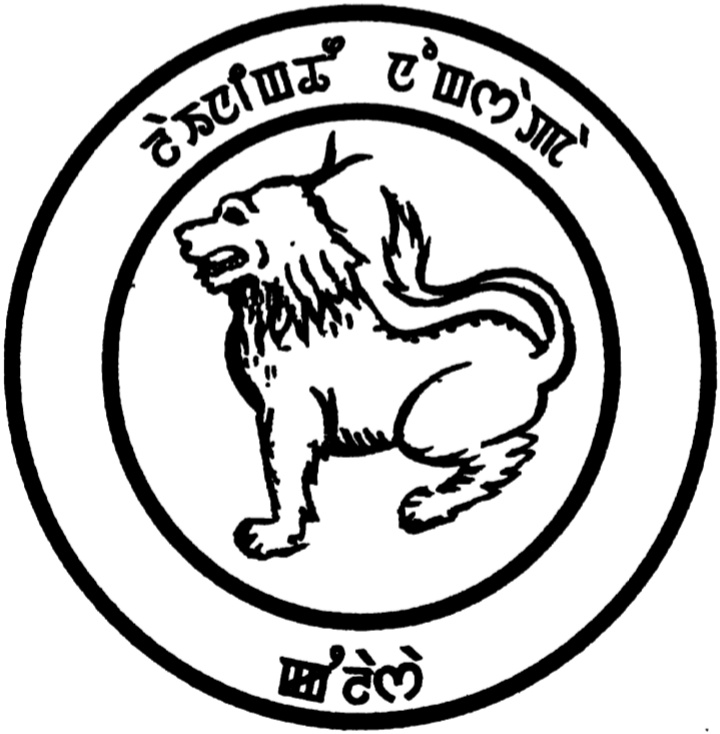
- Other names: Tholbu Chinglen Nongdai Ningthou; Maker of the Sun; Lion God; King of the gods
- Affiliation: Sanamahism
- Major cult center: Umang Lai cults
- Abode: Heaven and Earth
- Texts: Nongshaba Laihui
- Gender: Male
- Region: Ancient Kangleipak (early Manipur)
- Ethnic group: Meitei ethnicity
- Festivals: Lai Haraoba

Genealogy
- Parents: Salailen Sidaba (father)
- Siblings: Lainingthou Sanamahi; Hellois; Irai Leima; Khoriphaba; Khunu Leima; Ngaleima; Nganu Leima; Nongthang Leima; Pakhangba; Phouleima; Shapi Leima; Thumleima
- Consorts: Thongnang Leicha Khombi; Sarungleima
- Offspring: Thangching (born from Sarungleima).

Nongshaba (Meitei: ꯅꯣꯡꯁꯥꯕ) is a lion god in Sanamahism and Meitei mythology. He is also regarded as a king of the gods. He is credited with producing light in the primordial universe and is regarded as the maker of the sun. He is worshipped by the people of both the Ningthouja clans as well as the Moirang clans. Nongshaba was worshipped by the people of Moirang clan as a lineage deity and regarded as the father of the god Thangching. He is the greatest of the Umang Lais (Meitei for 'forest gods') but he made his only son Thangching the chief deity of Moirang.

== History ==
The cult of Nongshaba was brought from Moirang by Mungyaang Ngairaangba and Yumnaam Tonba, who presented the deity to King Khagemba (Meitei: ꯈꯥꯒꯦꯝꯕ) (r. 1597-1652 AD). The position Nongshaba's cult was buoyed by his recognition as an Umang Lai and installation as King of the gods, and the construction of a five storied-temple in his honour. Other Umang Lais became lesser deities. During the King's reign, a Meitei family, the Leithangbam, was given responsibility for the cult of Nongshaba. The Phura, a group of priestessess dedicated to Nongshaba was also established.

During the reign of King Paikhomba (Meitei: ꯄꯥꯏꯈꯣꯝꯕ) (r. 1666–1697 CE), there was a spiritual and symbolical marriage ceremony of princess Yaosombi (Meitei: ꯌꯥꯎꯁꯣꯝꯕꯤ) and Nongshaba, with the offering of an elephant to the deity. From the time of Khagemba until the accession of King Charairongba in 1687, the cult of Nongshaba was more popular than that of Lainingthou Sanamahi.

The cult of Nongshaba did not survive for long. During the early 18th century, Hindu priests from Sylhet arrived in Kangleipak to spread Gaudiya Vaishnavism. They were led by Shantidas Adhikari and his associate Gopal Das, who succeeded in converting King Pamheiba (r. 1709–1754 CE) from Sanamahism to Vaishnavism in 1710. Pamheimba changed his name to Gharib Nawaz and made Hinduism the official religion of Manipur. In 1723, Gharib Nawaz had most of the shrines of Umang Lai destroyed, and Hindu Brahmins took over their temples. On 17 October 1732, he ordered the destruction of the temples.

== Mythology ==
In Meitei mythology, Kangla Sha is a divine representation of Nongshaba.

According to the Nongshaba Laihui, Nongshaba is the second son of the Universal Lord, and is also known as Tholbu Chinglen Nongdai Ningthou. According to the text, Nongshaba is neither assigned much duty did he take a big role in the creation of the universe. Unlike his younger brother Pakhangba, Nongshaba did not stand in the way of his elder brother Lainingthou Sanamahi. Unlike his younger brother Pakhangba, Nongshaba does not have any human descendants, and unlike his elder brother Lainingthou Sanamahi, he does not have any manifestation in human form.'.

The Nongshaba Laihui further describes Nongshaba as:

"God Koubru served Nongshaba as his shawl, god Thangjing Koiren Ningthou as his back cushion, god Wangpuren, son of Wangnu Reima Khomchomphabi, as his carpet, God Marching, as his throne, god Nongpok Ningthou as his looking mirror, Telli Ningthou Sidaba as his clothes hanger, the sun god as his sekpin (canopy) and Pakhangba as arangchi, goddess"

The same text describes all the Umang Lai deities, including Sanamahi, as the attendants of Nongshaba.

The second stanza of the Meitei poem Anoirol, sung in the Lai Haraoba, mentions many sky deities including Nongshaba, the god of the sky of Moirang.

== Worship ==
Devotees worship Nonghsaba by offering white clothes, fruits, flowers, and fish, preferably sareng. In early times, Nongshaba was venerated, along with Pakhangba, in the Naoshumshang, the shrine of ancestral figures. Worshippers prayed to Nongshaba prayed for the longevity of the Meitei kings.

The Phura is a class of priestesses who manage the cult of Nongshaba.

== Representations in Meitei dress ==
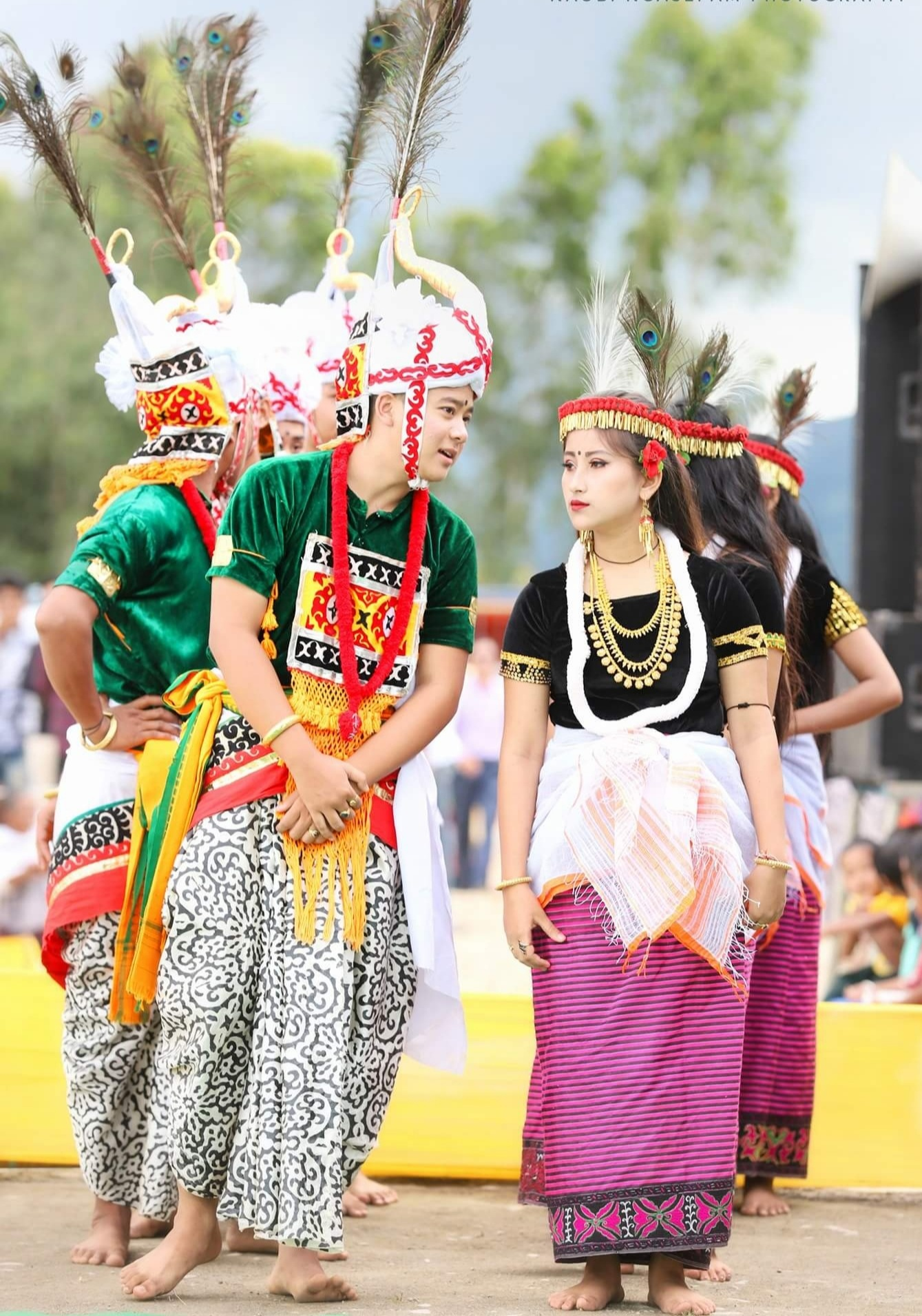
Women wearing Ningkham samjin dress representing Nongshaba.

The ningkham samjin costume worn by dancers represents Nongshaba. The samjin is an elaborate, tall, pointed headdress decorated with needlework with tassels and the ningkham is a triangular wrapper with an appliquéd border worn around the waist. The shape of the samjin is said represent Nongshaba's horned head, and his ears are represented by fan like frills on each side. The ningkham represents the tail of Nongshaba. Nongshaba's patterend body is represented by the wearing of the khamen chatpa loincloth and his beard by a long strip of a decorative fabric hanging loosely on the chest.

== In Bangladesh ==
Meitei kings constructed many temples dedicated to Meitei deities in Bangladesh, among which a shrine dedicated to Nongshaba was a notable one. In the Manipuri Rajbari in Lama Bazar of Bangladesh, there is a temple of Nongshaba, alongside temples of Pakhangba and Goddess Yumjao Leima. The Temple's facade faces south, and its ground plan is square, covering an area of 10m^{2}.

== Namesakes ==
On 15 December 2015 in Imphal, a fortnightly magazine named Nongsaba was launched under the motto "Journalism for change". The publication focuses on the socio-political, economy, education, unemployment, art and culture, science, sports, beauty, health, entertainment, etc.
