= Meitei dragons =

Legendary creature in Meitei mythology

Dragons play a significant role in the legendary accounts of Meitei folklore, literature, mythology and religion of ancient, medieval and modern Manipur.

== List ==
- The Hiyang Hiren (Old Manipuri: Hiyang Hilen) is a well furnished race boat. This is often built in the shape of a dragon. Many legends say that it possesses spiritual powers.
- Kangla Sha is the Guardian dragon lion, safeguarding the Kangla Palace. Kangla Sha are usually depicted in pairs.
- Nongshaba, the dragon lion, is a child of Atingkok, the Supreme Being. Unlike his siblings, he always remains in the form of the mythical beast rather than that of a God (human figure).
- Pakhangba is the youngest son of Leimarel Sidabi, the supreme mother earth goddess. He was given the throne of the universe to protect and rule the world by Atingkok, his father. He could change himself into both a serpentine dragon and a human. Several legends revolve around his identity as an ancient historical figure.
- Poubi Lai is the tyrant dragon serpent of the primitive Loktak Lake. This huge dragon is a popular figure in Meitei folklore and mythology.
- Taoroinai (Old Manipuri: Taoloinai) is a mythical dragon serpent, who lives in the cosmic ocean. It is known for bringing down the divine celestial egg (nonglum) down to earth.

== Gallery ==
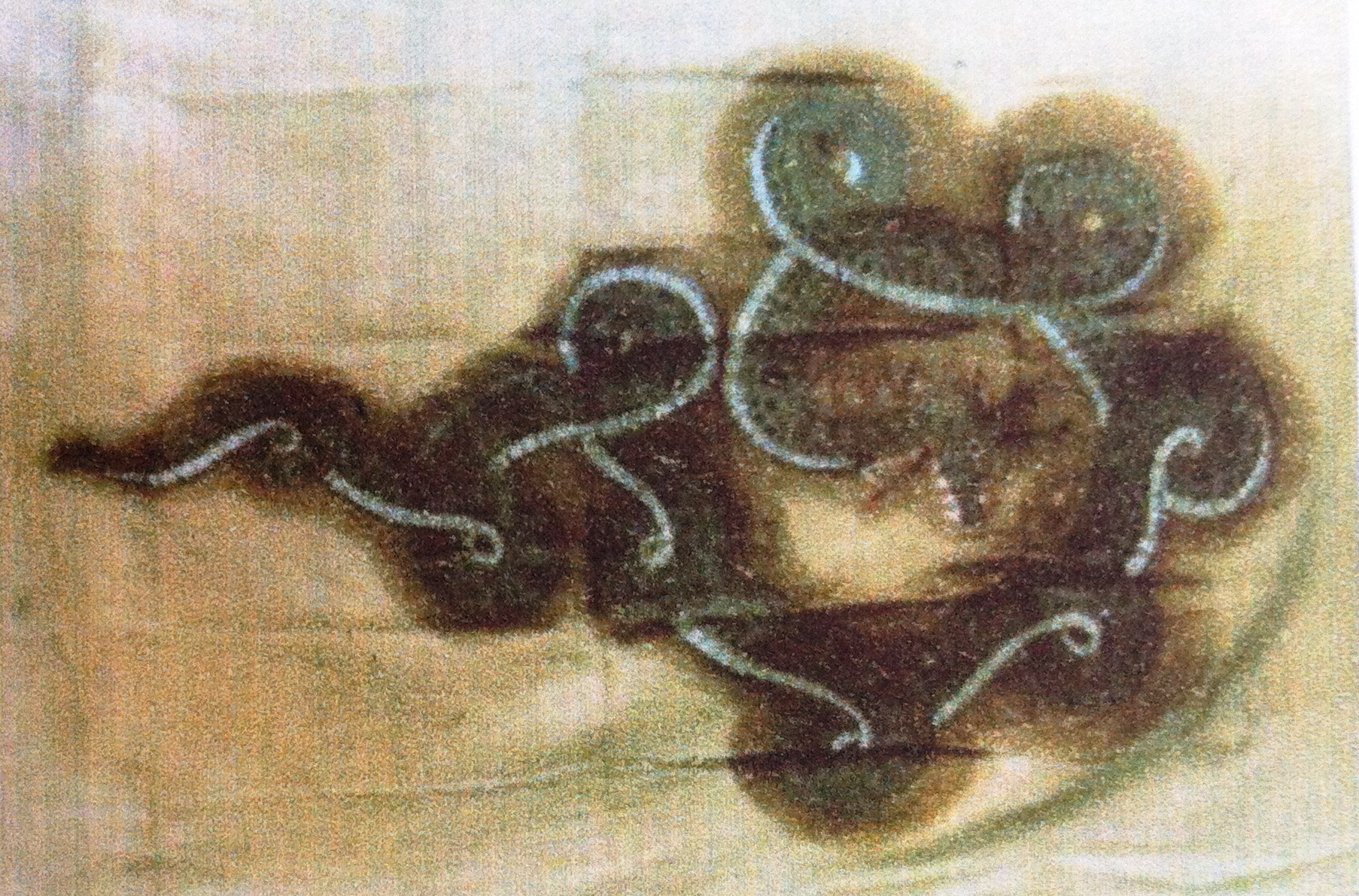
The Flag of Manipur hoisted on Indian Independence Day, 1947

The Flag of Manipur

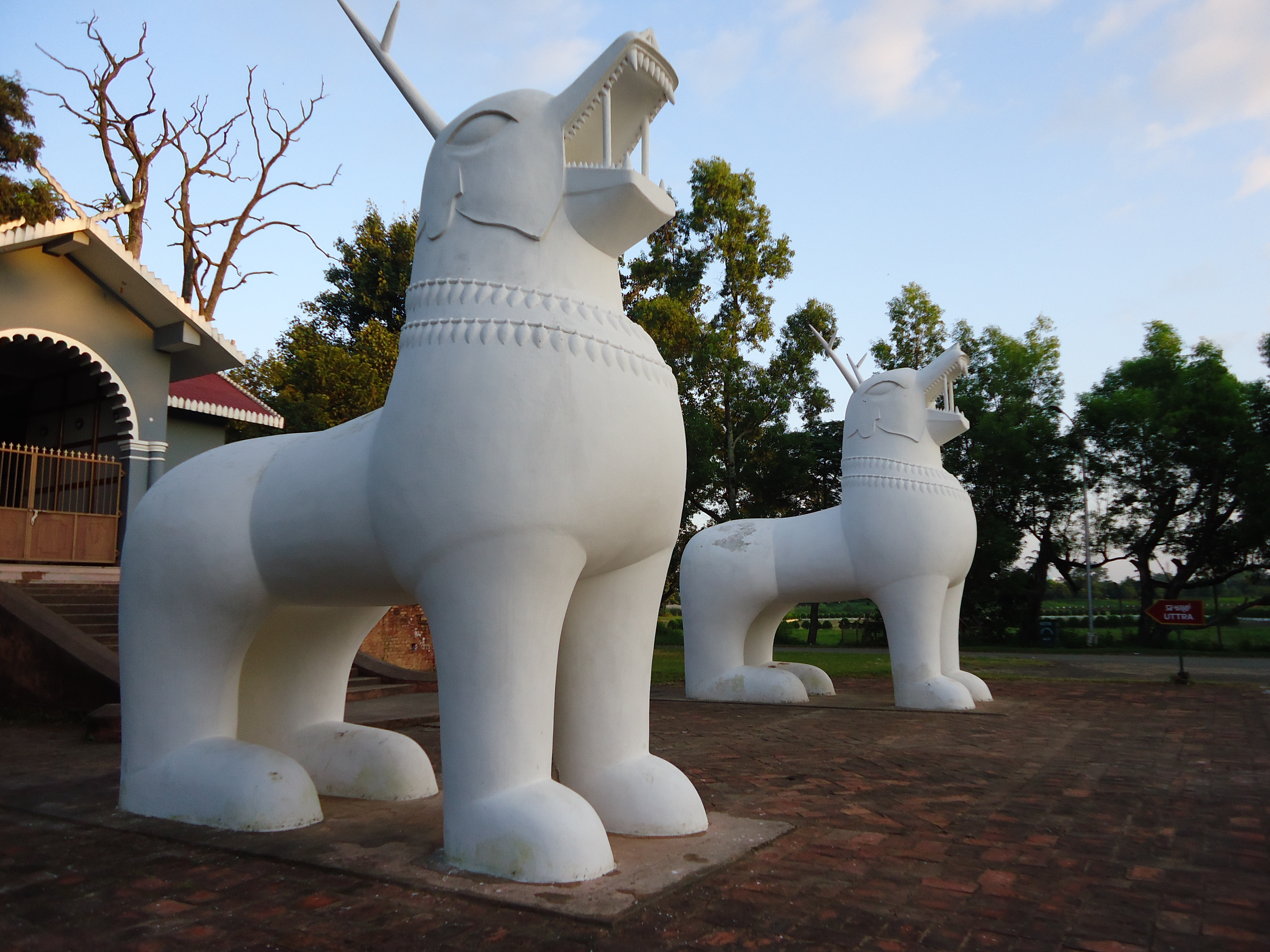
Kanglasha

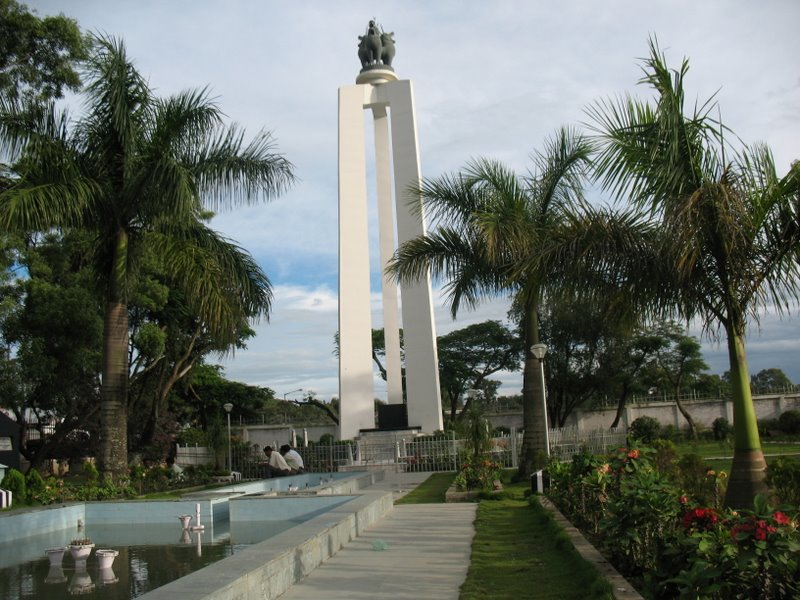
Kanglasha

== See also ==
- Chinese dragon
- European dragon
- Japanese dragon
- Korean dragon
