= Akongjamba =

Figure in Meitei mythology and folklore

- Created by: Thangjing

In-universe information
- Alias: Akongchampa
- Gender: Male
- Title: Nobleman of Ancient Moirang
- Occupation: Nobleman of the Moirang Kingdom
- Affiliation: Moirang Saiyon, Moirang Kangleirol, Meitei mythology, Meitei folklore
- Family: Thoidingjam
- Spouse: Thoidingjambi
- Religion: Meitei religion (Sanamahism)
- Origin: Moirang Kingdom

Akongjamba is a nobleman in Meitei mythology. He is a lover of the harvest Goddess Phouoibi. According to mythology, fate did not permit the lovers to unite, so they reincarnated. The lives of the two legendary lovers were believed to be enacted by Thangching as a part of the epic cycles of incarnations (Moirang Saiyon).

== Legends ==
According to a legend, Goddess Phouoibi set out on a journey along with Ngaleima and Thumleima. In Moirang, her trying to cross the river coincided with the presence of hunter Akongjamba. He instantaneously fell in love with her.

Several days later, Phouoibi went to Akongjamba's house, disguising herself as a tribal woman (Meitei: haonupi or haonubi). While he was not at home, his mother (Akongjamba's wife in another version) did not give Phouoibi shelter. Additionally, his mother tried to hit Phouoibi with a broom. As a divine being could lose their powers at the touch of profane objects, Phouoibi fled to the home's chicken coop and transformed into a chicken. Akongjamba's mother who was ascetic in chasing Phouoibi out, wanted to ensure that the 'tribal woman' had not stolen any of her chickens. In counting her precious chickens, however, the mother had failed to notice the additional one. Unnoticed, Phouoibi spent the night inside the chicken coop. The next day, she metamorphosed to a divine form in a resplendent, glowing dress. Standing at the entrance of the house, she shouted for Akongjamba's mother to come out. After the confused lady walked out, Phouoibi gave her an unprecedented payment for spending a night at the henhouse—she shook an enormous heap of golden grain off her dress—Akongjamba's mother was spellbound at this.

When Akongjamba returned home, he found the pile of the golden grain as high as a hill. His mother told him about what had unfolded. He soon realised that the strange lady was Phouoibi, his ladylove. He immediately followed her path. When he found her, Akongjamba pleaded that she return home with him. She responded that they were not destined to be together, for the stars were not aligned. Without an iota of sorrow, Phouoibi had disappeared.

== In popular culture ==
- Phou-oibi, the rice goddess is a 2009 ballad opera performed by the Laihui Ensemble. It is based on the love story of Phouoibi and Akongjamba.
- Phouoibi Shayon is a 2017 Manipuri mythology movie based on the love story of Phouoibi and Akongjamba.

== See also ==
- Adonis
