= Phouoibee (The Goddess of Paddy) =

Indian Meitei language feature film

Phouoibee (The Goddess of Paddy) is an Indian Meitei language feature film directed by Rakesh Moirangthem. The film was officially selected for the Competition on Indian Languages’ Film Category at the 31st Kolkata International Film Festival (KIFF) 2025, held from 6 to 13 November 2025 at Nandan, Kolkata.

The film explores the deep spiritual and cultural relationship between Meitei people, nature, and agriculture in Manipur, blending Meitei mythology and social realism.

== Overview ==
The film portrays the sacred bond between nature, spirituality, and the agrarian life of Manipur. It connects the daily struggles of farmers with the belief in Phouoibee, the Meitei goddess of paddy, who represents fertility and prosperity.

Through this story, the film highlights both the beauty and the challenges of rural life, focusing on how human labor, faith, and land are tied together in a fragile balance.

== Story ==
At the center of the story is Iboyaima, a farmer whose life becomes filled with hardship after miscreants destroy his crops. His family, including his daughter and brother, pray to the goddess Phouoibi for relief and a better future. The loss of their harvest drives Iboyaima into mental despair, showing the emotional and spiritual cost of survival in a world threatened by both nature and human actions.

The film mixes real events with mythological themes, using the story as a reflection on the dignity of farmers and the sanctity of the land.

== Production ==
Phouoibee (The Goddess of Paddy) is directed and edited by Rakesh Moirangthem, who has also worked as an editor on over fifteen films and as an editor-director on three commercial features before this project. The film was produced by Suraj Khongbantabam and co-produced by Shanti Raj.

The cinematography was done by Boong Konjengbam, sound design by Th. Ramakanta, and audiography by Romi Lamabam. The music was composed by Tenao HD, with Thokchom Lansana Chanu as singer and lyricist.

The story was written by Rakesh Moirangthem, Somendro Moirangthem, and Jenish Salam, with screenplay and dialogues by Y. Kumarjit. The film features makeup design by Bicha.

== Cast ==
- Raju Nong
- Y. Kumarjit
- Ch. Inaobi
- Loitongbam Dorendra
- Sushma Kshetri
- Bloomy Khwairakpam (child artist)

=== Director’s perspective ===
Director Rakesh Moirangthem described the film as a personal and artistic expression inspired by real experiences of Manipuri farmers. He stated that he had witnessed their struggles—hopes for rain, joy at a growing crop, and despair when it is destroyed by criminal acts. The film was made with patience, as some scenes were shot a year later to capture the right seasonal moments of harvest.

According to Moirangthem, Phouoibee is a story about "truth and reality," focusing on the resilience and sacredness found in rural life.

== Recognition ==
The selection of Phouoibee (The Goddess of Paddy) at the 31st Kolkata International Film Festival is considered a significant achievement for Meitei cinema. KIFF is one of India’s most respected film festivals and is accredited by the International Federation of Film Producers’ Associations (FIAPF) under the category International Competitive Specialized Feature Film Festivals.

The film’s inclusion in this category represents an important step for Manipuri filmmakers, marking a move from purely commercial productions toward artistic and critical cinema that can reach national and international audiences.

== See also ==
- Lai Haraoba
