= Irai Ningthou =

- God of Water
- Affiliation: Sanamahism
- Abodes: Rivers and Lakes
- Texts: PuYas
- Gender: Male
- Region: Manipur
- Ethnic group: Meitei
- Festivals: Lai Haraoba
- Consort: Irai Leima

Irai Ningthou (Meitei: ꯏꯔꯥꯢ ꯂꯤꯡꯊꯧ, lit. 'King of water') is a God in Sanamahism, the indigenous religion of Manipur. He is the God and the divine male personification of water and the consort of Irai Leima. He mainly dwells in the rivers and lakes.

== Worship ==
If someone becomes ill after bathing body of water, people believe that the water spirits Irai Ningthou and Irai Leima are the cause. For this, the maibas are called upon to perform the rites that will appease the water spirits. The offerings made usually include two eggs and seven bamboo vessels filled with rice paste.

The Thadou people also highly honour the water deities. They offer wild sacrifices like white fowl, pig, dog or he-goat to the God.
