= Taoroinai =

- Serpentine Dragon God of the Moon
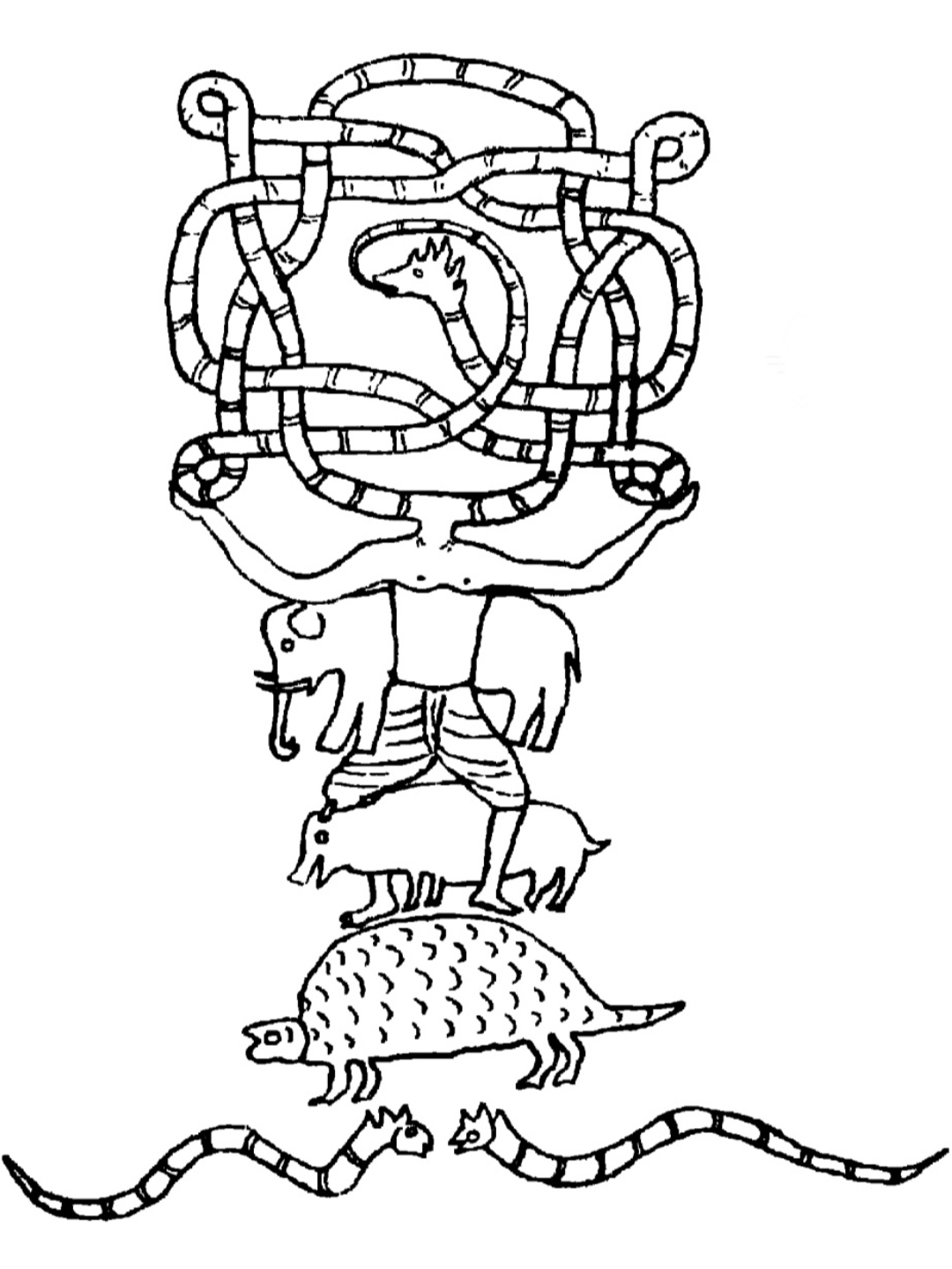
- Dragon God Taoroinai depicted as the ultimate form of life in the Leithak Leikharol text
- Other names: Taoroinai Pakhangba (Old Manipuri: Taoloinai Pakhangpa); Tauroinai Pakhangba (Old Manipuri: Tauloinai Pakhangpa)
- Major cult center: Kangla
- Abodes: Moon and Earth
- Texts: Leithak Leikharol; Sakok Lamlen
- Gender: Male
- Region: Manipur
- Ethnic group: Meitei

Taoroinai (Meitei: ꯇꯥꯎꯔꯣꯢꯅꯥꯢ) is a snake-like dragon in Meitei mythology and Sanamahism, the indigenous religion of Manipur. It lived in the land of the Moon. According to the Shakok Lamlen, the Kangla was constructed over the navel of Taoroinai.

== Mythology ==
=== Taoroinai's voyage from the Moon to the Earth ===
According to the Sanggai Phammang, Taoroinai lived on the Moon. He was ordered by the God Atiya (Atingkok) to carry His image to the Earth. He swallowed the image of the God in his mouth and brought it down. He lived inside the Earth. The God's image was later born as a divine boy.

=== Taoroinai and the Heavenly egg ===
According to the Leithak Leikharol and the Krathok Lamlen, Taoroinai went to the heavens disguises as Tupu (officer in charge) and brought down the divine cloud egg (nonglum) of Atiya. He gave the egg to a polyandrous person. Later, the egg became Pakhangba.

According to the Meihourol Makok Latam, God Atiya wanted to create an earthly king from his own body. He asked the goddess Leimarel Sidabi to call Taoroinai. Taoroinai was asked by Leimaren to bring the image of God Atiya in the shape of Nonglum (egg of cloud). Goddess Leimaren received the heavenly egg containing another God. After this, Leimaren was also known as Yaibirok (Yaipilok).

According to the Leimaren Naoyom, Taoroinai gave an embryonic egg to Leimarel Sidabi, a solar goddess (or a celestial goddess). Later, goddess Leimaren (alias Yaibirok) gave birth to Pakhangba.

=== Taoroinai and the solar sperm ===
According to the Pakhangba Nonggarol, Taoroinai brought a God from the centre of the Sun as a sperm inside his body after the completion of the creation of the universe. He gave it to goddess Leinung Yaipirok (alias Leimarel Sidabi).

=== Taoroinai and the Kangla ===
The Thon Talet Thonlanmei shows the seven layers of the Royal Palace in the Kangla. It shows the gradual evolution of the mankind. According to the illustration, the mankind ascended from the lowest form to the highest form. The forms are (1) fish, (2) snake, (3) tortoise, (4) boar, (5) cow, (6) elephant and (7) man and finally Taoroinai. Taoroinai is shown as the ultimate form of life.

According to the Kangla Houba (Kanglalon) written by Ashangbam Laiba in the 5th century, Meitei King Naophangba attempted to construct a new palace in the Kangla. The king's plan was rejected by 13 year old Maichou Ashangbam Laiba. During that time, blood gushed out of the holes of the erecting pillars. It was believed that the erecting pillars struck the body of God Taoroinai. So, the King requested Ashangbam Laiba to rectify the pillar position. Laiba did as requested. Later, without any chaos, a seven storied palace building was able to be constructed in the Kangla.

=== Taoroinai's dance ===
According to the Anoirol, Lady Toibi Tanka Nubi (Tankha Chanu) danced with her father, Taoroinai. She learned how to dance from Taoroinai step by step and movement by movement. They danced together. Other living beings also imitated their way of dancing. It was performed to celebrate happiness of the removal of the Lingkam Laikam curse. The curse was removed by the ancestors.

Seven maidens namely Tankha, Phuitingwak, Khuyon, Phuitingloubi, Toura, Nongdang and Lengbi and nine gods learned how to dance from Dragon Father Taoroinai. The rhythmic and smooth dancing of the maidens surprised all the creatures of the world. All the creatures came out and started to dance. The movements of Lady Tankha Chanu resembled that of the snake. Her steps destroyed all the plants and the flowers on her way. It is believed that the place of her enactment of the dance is the Mahou Phaibok hill.

A male squirrel watched father and daughter dance and imitated them. Seeing him dancing, a female squirrel also danced. The son squirrel laughed at his mother squirrel. At this, the female squirrel was embarrassed. The dancing squirrels were later joined by other creatures. And so, the dance never ended.

== See also ==
- Nongshaba - Dragon Lion
- Pakhangba - Celestial Dragon
- Poubi Lai - Water Dragon
