= Irai Leima =

- Goddess of water and aquatic life
- Member of Lairembis
- Other names: Hiyangthang Lairembi
- Affiliation: Sanamahism
- Major cult center: Hiyangthang Lairembi Temple
- Abode: Underwater world
- Texts: Puyas
- Gender: Female
- Region: Manipur
- Ethnic group: Meitei
- Festivals: Lai Haraoba

Genealogy
- Parents: Salailen (father)
- Siblings: Phouoibi; Ngaleima; Thumleima
- Consort: Irai Ningthou

Equivalents
- Greek: Amphitrite
- Roman: Salacia

Irai Leima (Meitei: ꯏꯔꯥꯢ ꯂꯩꯃ) is a goddess in Sanamahism, the indigenous religion of in the northeastern Indian state of Manipur. She is the goddess and the divine female personification of water and aquatic life. She is the consort of Irai Ningthou (literally, king of water). Both are regarded as the divine spirits of water bodies. She is also considered to be in charge of diseases.

== Mythology ==
Irai Leima is the daughter of King Heibok Ningthou and the princess of Heibok Ching. Her father was an expert in witchcraft and black magic. Irai Leima is known for her exceptional beauty. One day, she was fishing in the Liwa river. King Kwakpa (Kokpa) of Khuman dynasty saw her and fell in love with her. He proposed her. She replied that her parents' wish will be her wish. So, King Kwakpa consulted his subjects. They presented Heibok Ningthou with many presents. King Kwakpa planned to marry Irai Leima if her father agreed or to bring her by force if her father rejected. Seeing the arrogance of Kwakpa, Heibok Ningthou turned all the gifts into stone. At this, followers of Kwakpa fled the place. Kwakpa returned home disappointed.

One day, King Kwakpa became intoxicated after drinking juice from the roots of a Tera plant (Bombax malabaricum). He wanted to meet Irai Leima. So, he went to her place riding on a Hiyang boat. Seeing his approach, she fled to Pakhra Ching mountain. Kwakpa chased her. Seeing all these, Heibok Ningthou turned the Hiyang boat into stone and the oar into a tree. Getting angry, Kwakpa ran towards Heibok Ningthou to kill him. Then, Heibok Ningthou turned Khuman Kwakpa into a stone. Irai Leima saw all this and was afraid of her father. She left her father and ran away. She passed the Pakhra Ching, crossed the Liwa river and entered the house of Sarangthem Luwangba. She hid herself inside the granary of the house. When Sarangthem Luwangba and his good lady Thoidingjam Chanu Amurei left the house for field, Irai Leima came out from her hiding place. In the meantime, she completed all the household chores. When the couple returned home, she hid herself again. The couple got surprised at this but it happened everyday. So, one day, the man returned home earlier than usual. He found out the truth. But when he came near Irai Leima, she had disappeared below the granary. He looked under the granary but he saw nothing. He was amazed at this. So, he discussed the issue with all his clan members. They searched everywhere but didn't find her anymore.

Irai Leima appeared in the dream of Sarangthem Luwangba and told him that she was merged into his clan and became his daughter. The matter was reported to King Senbi Kiyaamba of Ningthouja dynasty. The king sent maibas and maibis to examine the case. The examiners said that the mysterious lady was a goddess and she should be worshipped. King Kiyaamba also told Luwangba to do so. From that year onwards, Irai Leima was worshipped as a goddess.

The day on which Luwangba first saw Irai Leima was the first Monday of the Meitei lunar month of Lamta (Lamda). And the day on which the maibas and maibis came was the first Tuesday of Lamta (Lamda). Still today, from the time of King Senbi Kiyaamba (1467-1508 AD), the Sarangthem family members annually hold a grand feast (Chaklen Katpa) in honor of the goddess. Later, Irai Leima came to be known as Hiyangthang Lairembi.

== Worship ==
When a person gets ill after bathing in a spring, pool, stream, people believed that the water spirits (Irai Leima and Irai Ningthou) had caught the person. To get well again, people worship the two deities. For this, the maibas perform the rites and rituals. The offerings include 2 eggs and 7 bamboo vessels filled up with rice paste. The Thadou people also highly respect the deities. They offer many wild sacrifices. The sacrifices maybe a white fowl, a pig, a dog or a he-goat.

== Identification with other deities ==
Irai Leima is considered one of the divine manifestations of Leimarel Sidabi, the supreme mother earth goddess. She is also described as a form of goddess Imoinu.

Irai Leima is also known as Hiyangthang Lairembi. During the reign of King Garib Niwaj (alias Pamheiba), goddess Hiyangthang Lairembi was converted to Hindu goddess Kamakhya (a form of Durga). The 3rd day of Durga Puja is observed as the "Bor Numit" (literally, Boon Day).

== In popular culture ==
- Phou-oibi, the rice goddess is a 2009 ballad opera performed by the Laihui Ensemble. It is based on the story of the goddess and her sister Phouoibi.
- Phouoibi Shayon is a 2017 Manipuri mythology movie based on the story of the goddess and her sister Phouoibi.
