= Nongthang Leima =

Meitei goddess

- Goddess of enchantment, seduction, thunder and lightning
- Member of Lairembis
- Other names: Penu Nongthang Leima; Kajeng Nongthang Leima (Old Manipuri: Kacheng Nongthang Leima); Nongthang Lairembi (Old Manipuri: Nongthang Lailempi); Nongthang Lairemma (Old Manipuri: Nongthang Lailemma); Langmai Sana Chingjaroibi (Old Manipuri: Langmai Sana Chingchaloipi)
- Affiliation: Meitei mythology (Manipuri mythology) and Meitei religion (Sanamahism)
- Abode: Heaven
- Symbols: thunder and lightning
- Texts: Leithak Leikharol
- Gender: Female
- Region: Ancient Kangleipak (Antique Manipur)
- Ethnic group: Meitei ethnicity
- Festivals: Lai Haraoba

Genealogy
- Parents: Salailen (or Atingkok) (father)
- Siblings: Sanamahi and Pakhangba
- Consorts: Sanamahi and Pakhangba
- Offspring: Laisang Khekwaiba (with Sanamahi)

Equivalents
- Greek: Astrape and Bronte
- Roman: Fulgora

In Meitei mythology and religion, Nongthang Leima (Meitei: ꯅꯣꯡꯊꯥꯡ ꯂꯩꯃ, romanized: lightning queen) is the goddess of seduction, thunder, and lightning. She was created by Atingkok (or Salailen) to attract Haraba (Pakhangba). She mastered thunder and lightning in the chaos in the early world. She predicted the first rain. She limits the chaos and helps creation.

== Description ==
Nongthang Leima is a pre-historical maibi. She is the first goddess maibi to compose a dance form. Later, her dance form was repossessed by other goddesses.

== Mythology ==
=== Birth ===
Sanamahi (Ashiba) was creating the earth. But he was frequently disturbed by his younger brother, Pakhangba (Haraba). Unable to do any work, Sanamahi complained about the matter to their father, Salailen (or Atingkok according to different versions of stories). Salailen produced a divine feminine being. He released her into the great space (void) of the universe (cosmos). In the vast emptiness of the great space (void), the divine feminine being became a beautiful and radiant goddess. She was named "Nongthang Leima", the Queen of Lightning.

In another version of the story, Sidaba ordered Sidabi to produce "Nongthang Leima", the divine female being to lure the destroyer from the cosmic creation.

=== Seduction (attraction) ===
Nongthang Leima, the Queen of Lightning, filled the empty space (void) with bright light. Seeing her, Pakhangba (Haraba) fell in love with her. He forgot about bothering his elder brother in the creation of the earth. Haraba came to her in the great space. During that time, Sanamahi (Ashiba) completed his creation of the earth.

=== Family ===
When Ashiba (Sanamahi) saw Nongthang Leima, he wanted to marry her. Thus, they united. So, Nongthang Leima was the wife of both Sanamahi (Ashiba) and Pakhangba (Haraba). Nongthang Leima is also known as Langmai Sana Chingjaroibi (Old Manipuri: Langmai Sana Chingchaloipi). With the union of Chingjaroibi and Sanamahi, a son named Laisang Khekwaiba was born.

=== Two divine forms ===
According to "Politics, society, and cosmology in India's North East" written by N. Vijaylakshmi, the goddess Nongthang Leima (Nongthang Lairembi) took two divine forms after the completion of the creation of the earth. One form is Panthoibi. This form lives in the home of gods. Another form is "Apanthoibi". This form lives among the living beings.

Basis	Panthoibi	Apanthoibi
Existence of representations or manifestations in the universe	No	Yes
Existence of particular forms	No	Yes
Existence of forms as animate as well as inanimate objects	No	Yes
Representations in all virtues and beauty	Yes	No
Supreme creator (mother) of all the seven salais (clans)	No	Yes

== Music ==
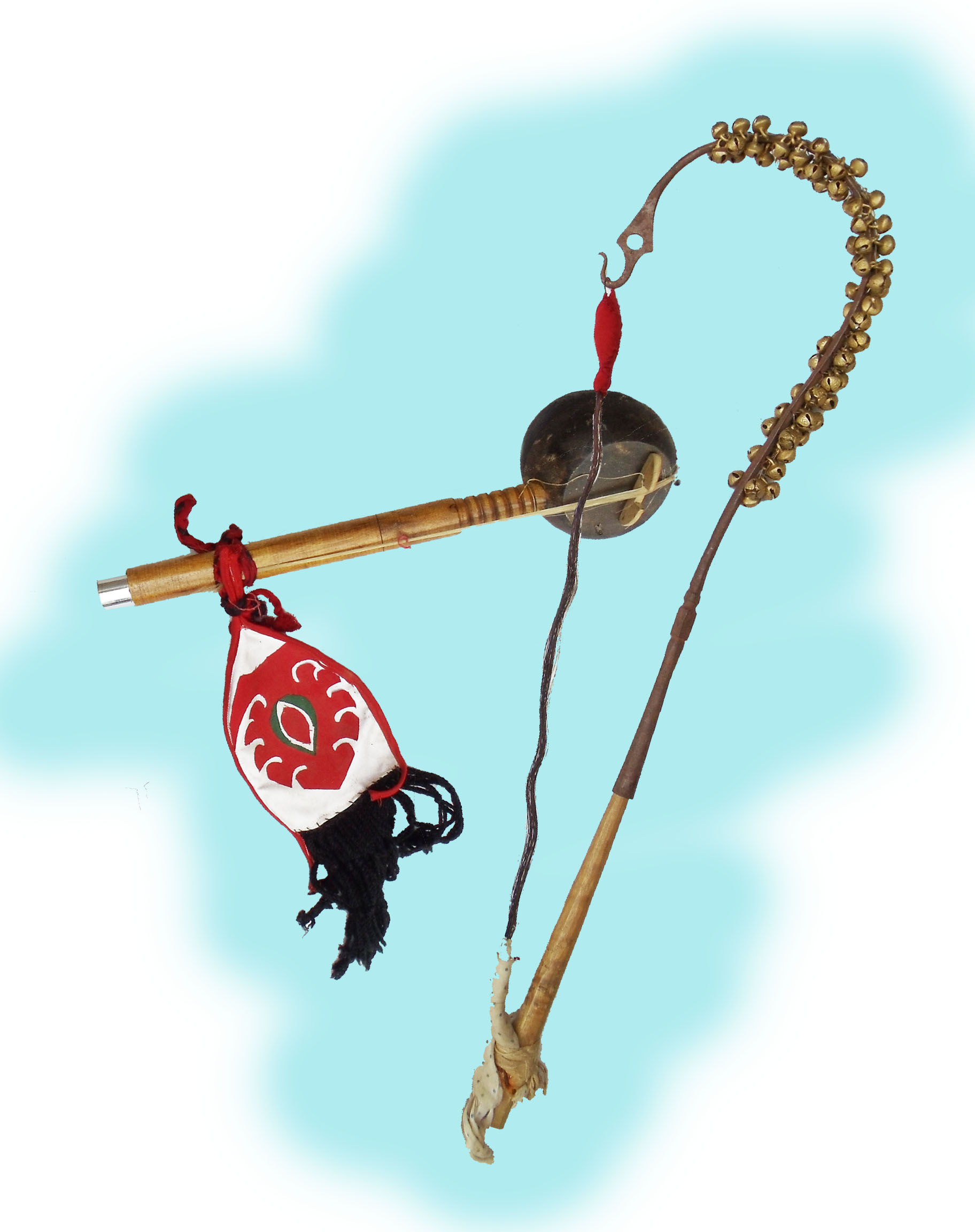
Pena (musical instrument) is used to perform various musical rhythms associated with Goddess Nongthang Leima.

Among the nine forms of musical rhythms (Seisaks) of Pena (musical instrument), Nongthang Leima Seisak is one. All these rhythms are categorised into three movements, slow rhythm, medium rhythm and fast rhythm. Nongthang Leima song belongs to the fast rhythm.

== Festival ==
During the Lai Haraoba festival, devotees dance to please various deities. Among them, male dancers act after the styles of Haraba (alias Pakhangba) and female dancers act after the styles of goddess Nongthang Leima. Goddess Nongthang Leima represents the lightning.

== Identification with other deities ==
Goddess Nongthang Leima is often identified as Leimarel Sidabi. The former is considered as an incarnation of the latter.
