= Phouoibi Waron =

Meitei text

- Author: unknown
- Translators: E. Nilakanta
- Language: Meitei language
- Genre: Meitei mythology
- Published: 13-14th century
- Publication place: Manipur; India (current)
- Media type: book
- This is an account of the goddess Phouoibi's love affairs with many mortals.

The Phouoibi Waron (Meitei: ꯐꯧꯑꯣꯢꯕꯤ ꯋꯥꯔꯣꯟ) or Phouoibi Warol (Meitei: ꯐꯧꯑꯣꯢꯕꯤ ꯋꯥꯔꯣꯜ) is a Medieval Indian Meitei text (Puya) written in a period between 13th and 14th century AD. It deals with the life story of the lovers of Phouoibi, the goddess of agricultural crops and harvest in Meitei mythology and religion (Sanamahism).

The story in the text is a very usual product of the agriculture of Ancient Manipur (Antique Kangleipak). Phouoibi is believed to be very fickle in love. She has multiple lovers. Her lovers are generally mortals. She doesn't live with anyone of them forever. She travels from place to place and makes love with many mortals. But she leaves them after some time. She lives with some of her favourite lovers for some time but she leaves them too. The nature of the goddess of agricultural crops and harvest is imagined to be fickle or tricky. This symbolises that wealth isn't a permanent property. It doesn't last long to a certain place. Devastations due to battles and natural disasters were common in ancient times. It is the reason why the paddy goddess was considered to be very irregular in bestowing her favor to the mankind.

The Phouoibi Waron and many other Puyas reveal much about the Meitei rites and rituals of ancient times. These rites and rituals are still widely practiced by the maibas, maibis and others.
