= Moirang Shayon =

Old Meitei epic tales of seven cycles of incarnations of two divine lovers

Epic cycles of incarnations
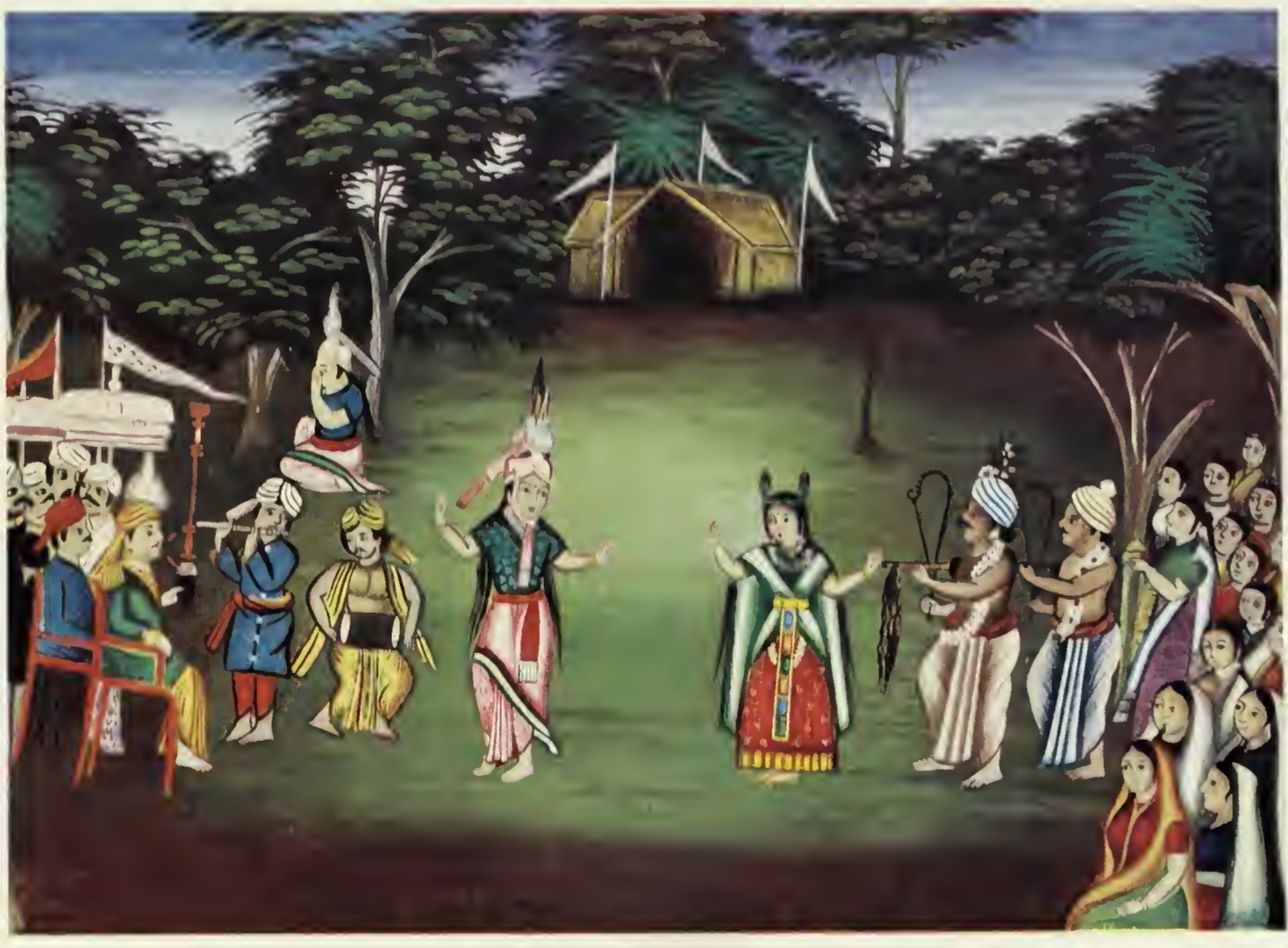
- Khuman Khamba and Moirang Thoibi dancing before the King of Moirang

Folk tale
- Name: Epic cycles of incarnations
- Also known as: Epic cycles of rebirths; Epics of seven incarnations; Moirang Saion (Old Manipuri: Moilang Saion); Moirang Shaion (Old Manipuri: Moilang Shaion); Moirang Sayon (Old Manipuri: Moilang Sayon); Moirang Shayon (Old Manipuri: Moilang Shayon)
- Mythology: Meitei mythology (Manipuri mythology)
- Country: Ancient Kangleipak (historical); India (present)
- Region: Moirang, Manipur
- Related: Meitei folklore (Manipuri folklore), Meitei literature (Manipuri literature)

In Meitei mythology and folklore, the epic cycles of incarnations in Moirang (Meitei: Moirang Shayon, Moirang Sayon; Old Manipuri: Moilang Shaion, Moilang Saion) is a cyclic epic of seven incarnations (nine in some versions) of two divine lovers in the kingdom of Moirang (Note: Moirang was an independent kingdom in early times, though later became a province of a unified kingdom, called Manipur Kingdom.) in the realm of Ancient Kangleipak (early Manipur).

== Contents ==
=== Akongjamba and Phouoibi (ꯑꯀꯣꯡꯖꯥꯝꯕ – ꯐꯧꯑꯣꯏꯕꯤ) ===
During the reign of King Iwang Puriklai Kaba Purang (917–981 AD), Akongjamba, a handsome, married nobleman of Moirang, was captivated by the goddess Phouoibi, who fell in love with him. Due to Akongjamba's failure to keep his word and the cruelty of Akongjamba's wife, Phouoibi decides to leave the human world as well as her lover.

=== Henjunaha and Lairoulembi (ꯍꯦꯟꯖꯨꯅꯍꯥ – ꯂꯥꯏꯔꯧꯂꯦꯝꯕꯤ) ===
During the reign of King Iwang Puriklai Telheiba (28–78 AD), Henjunaha Yangleingamba, a fatherless lad, was brought up by a poor widowed mother. He loved Thongnang Lairoulembi, a beautiful lady brought up by a rich father. Henjunaha is murdered by evil spirits. Lairoulembi follows her lover by killing herself, after which she faces troubles and adventures in the underworld.

=== Khuyol Haoba and Yaithing Konu (ꯈꯨꯌꯣꯜ ꯍꯥꯎꯕ – ꯌꯥꯏꯊꯤꯡ ꯀꯣꯅꯨ) ===
During the reign of King Iwang Puriklai Sana Lakhwa (185–236 AD), Khuyol Haoba, was the son of late Khundouremba, a court official of Moirang. Yaithing Konu was the daughter of Luwang Huiningsumba, an influential nobleman. During an escape from a murderous attack by his enemies, Khuyol Haoba falls in love with Yaithing Konu. Konu is married, but fate permits Konu to unite with Haoba in the end.

=== Kadeng Thangjahanba and Tonu Laijinglembi (ꯀꯗꯦꯡ ꯊꯥꯡꯖꯍꯟꯕ – ꯇꯣꯅꯨ ꯂꯥꯏꯖꯤꯡꯂꯦꯝꯕꯤ) ===
During the reign of King Iwang Puriklai Laijing Punsiba (1138–1210 AD), Kadeng Thangjahanba is a talented and skilful royal chief metalsmith appointed by King Laijing Ningthou Punsiba. He loves Tonu Laijinglembi, the only daughter of Laijing Lakpa, a favourite nobleman of the King of Moirang. During the absence of Thangjahanba, Tonu is married to the King of Moirang, who was unaware of the relationship between the two lovers. Once the king found out the truth, he generously returns the lady to her true lover.

=== Ura Naha Khongjomba and Pidonnu (ꯎꯔꯥ ꯅꯍꯥ ꯈꯣꯡꯖꯣꯝꯕ – ꯄꯤꯗꯣꯅꯨ) ===
During the reign of King Iwang Puriklai Laijing Punsiba (1138–1210 AD), Khongjomba (1210–1263 AD) was the son of King Laijing Ningthou Punsiba and Lady Tonu Laijinglembi, but he was born in the house of his foster father Kadeng Thangjahanba, the second husband of Tonu Laijinglembi. Pidonnu was the daughter of a nobleman. Born as a legitimate but unrecognized royal offspring, Khongjomba faced abuse from the king's adopted son and her for his love affair with Lady Pidonnu. When the king discovers the truth, he his true son Khongjomba crowned as the sovereign of Moirang, discarding his adopted heir.

=== Wanglen Pungdingheiba and Sappa Chanu Silheibi (ꯋꯥꯡꯂꯦꯟ ꯄꯨꯡꯗꯤꯡꯍꯩꯕ – ꯁꯥꯞꯄ ꯆꯅꯨ ꯁꯤꯜꯍꯩꯕꯤ) ===
During the reign of King Iwang Puriklai Ura Khongyamba (533–574 AD), Wanglen Pungdingheiba was a skilled maker of pung (a type of drum). Lady Sappa Chanu Silheibi was a skilful weaver. The two lovers compete to determine who can perform their craft the fastest. Due to a misunderstanding, Lady Silheibi believes she is being mocked for her defeat and kills herself. Upon discovering his lover's corpse in a pool of blood, Pungdingheiba follows her.

=== Khamba Thoibi (no: ꯈꯝꯕ – ꯊꯣꯏꯕꯤ) ===
During the reign of King Iwang Puriklai Chingkhu Telheiba (1083–1138 AD), Khuman Khamba, an orphan raised by his elder sister, and Thoibi, the only princess of Moirang, fall in love. After facing different adventures, conspiracies, cruelties, threats and even murder attempts, the two lovers are united.

== In popular culture ==
In popular culture, the epic cycles of incarnations appear in arts, books, movies, theatres and many others.

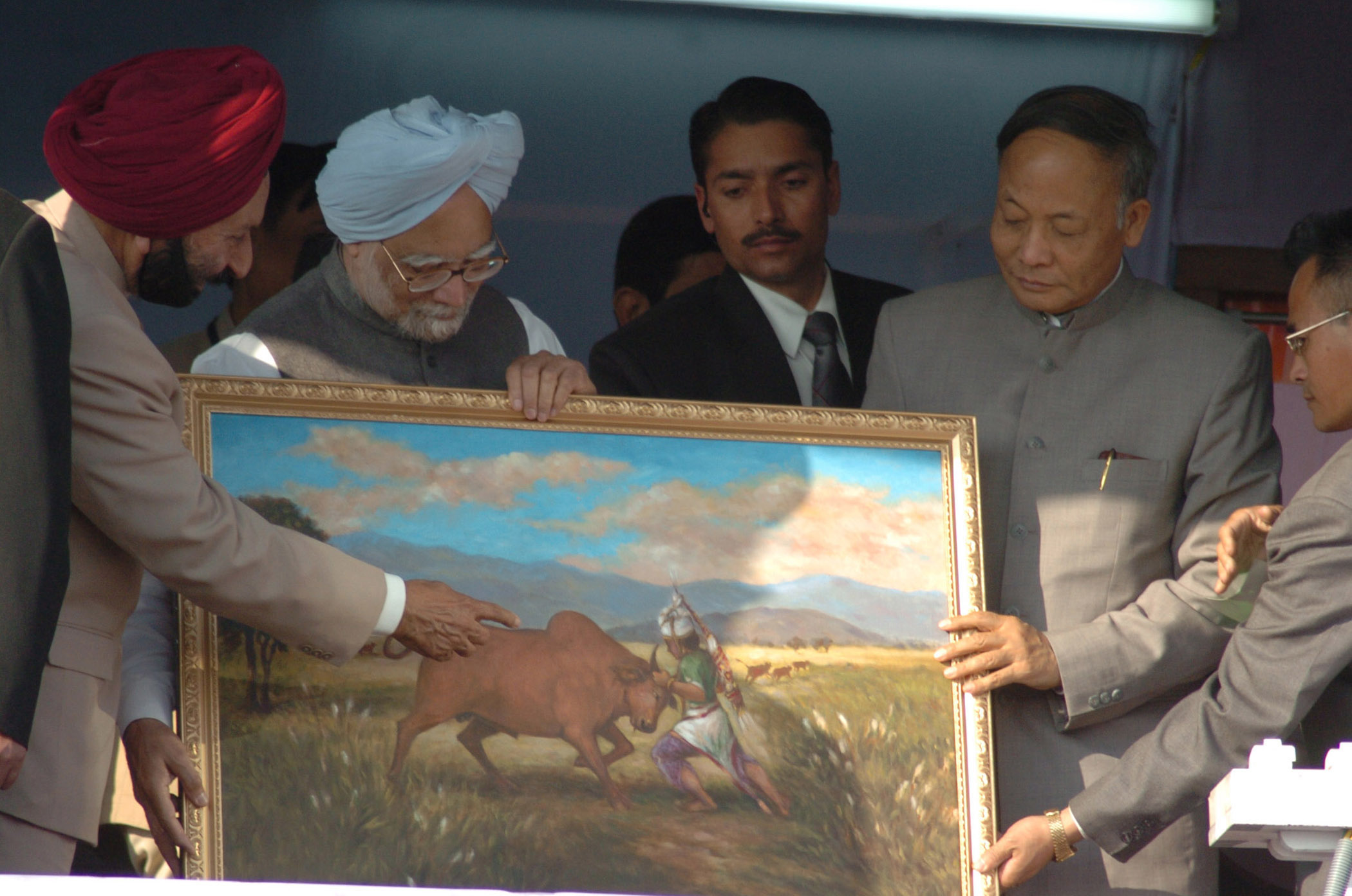
Manmohan Singh, the then prime minister of India, being presented a memento of a painting depicting Khuman Khamba capturing the Kao (bull), by Shivinder Singh Sidhu, the then Governor of Manipur and Okram Ibobi Singh, the then Chief Minister of Manipur, on the occasion of the foundation stone laying ceremony of three projects, National Academy of Sports, Convention Center and Manipur Institute of Technology, in the Kangla in Manipur on 2 December 2006

- Khamba Thoibi – a 1997 Meitei language film directed by Moirangthem Nilamani Singh
- Khambana Kao Phaba (painting) – a 2001 Meitei oil canvas painting, by M Betombi Singh, depicting Khuman Khamba capturing the Kao (bull)
- "Kao, the sacred bull" – a 2011 Meitei language theatrical show, by the Laihui Ensemble, about Khuman Khamba capturing the Kao (bull)
- Phou-oibi, the Rice Goddess – a 2013 Meitei language ballad opera
- "Tonu Laijinglembi" – a 2014 Meitei language drama written by Sarangthem Bormani and directed by B Jugolchandra
- Phouoibi Shayon – a 2017 Meitei language film
- Tonu Laijinglembi – a 2018 Meitei language drama, directed by L Bikram of the "Aryan Theatre, Imphal"
- Tonu Laijinglembi Seitharol – a 2018 Meitei Mayek edition of the book "Tonu Laijinglembi Seitharol" written by Hijam Guno
- Kao Faba – a 2020 Meitei language Shumang Kumhei, performed by Western Cultural Association, about Khuman Khamba capturing the Kao (bull)

== See also ==
- And That Is Why... Manipuri Myths Retold
- List of epics in Meitei language
- Numit Kappa
- The Tales of Kanglei Throne
