= Thumleima =

Meitei goddess of salt

Noinu Thumleima
- Goddess of salt and salt wells
- Member of Lairembis
- Other names: Thumkhong Lairembi
- Affiliation: Meitei mythology and Meitei religion (Sanamahism)
- Abodes: Salt brines
- Symbol: Salts
- Texts: Phouoibi Waron
- Gender: Female
- Region: Manipur
- Ethnic group: Meitei
- Festivals: Lai Haraoba

Genealogy
- Parents: Salailen (father)
- Siblings: Phouoibi; Ngaleima; Ereima

Equivalents
- Greek: Amphitrite
- Roman: Salacia

Noinu Thumleima (Meitei pronunciation: nói.nu tʰum.lə́i.mə) or Thumkhong Lairembi (Old Manipuri: Thumkhong Lailempi) is the Meitei goddess of salt.

== About ==
Thumleima (Meitei: ꯊꯨꯝꯂꯩꯃ, romanized: tʰum.lə́i.mə, lit. 'salt queen'), the Goddess of salt is also known as Thumkhong Lairembi (Meitei: ꯊꯨꯝꯈꯣꯡ ꯂꯥꯢꯔꯦꯝꯕꯤ, romanized: salt-well goddess) She is a sister (or sometimes friend) of the goddesses Phouoibi, Ngaleima and Ereima and a wife of Pakhangba, the royal deity.

People pray to her so there will be enough salt.

== In popular culture ==
- Phou-oibi, the rice goddess is a 2009 ballad opera based on the story of the goddess and her sister Phouoibi.
- Phouoibi Shayon is a 2017 movie based on the story of the goddess and her sister Phouoibi.

== See also ==
- Panthoibi, Meitei goddess of civilization, love, and warfare
