= Phouoibi Shayon =

2017 Manipuri language film

- A theatrical poster for "Phouoibi Shayon"
- Directed by: Oinam Samananda Meetei (O.S. Meetei)
- Written by: Goshe Meitei
- Story by: saga of goddess Phouoibi within the epic cycles of incarnations
- Based on: Epic cycles of incarnations of Meitei mythology by Goshe Meitei
- Produced by: Kanglei Movies World and Sergey Film Production
- Starring: Lilabati Chanam; Kaiku Rajkumar; Gokul Athokpam
- Distributed by: Shankar Talkies
- Release date: 2 April 2017
- Country: India
- Language: Meiteilon (Manipuri)

Phouoibi Shayon (transl. The incarnation of Phouoibi), shortly known as Phouoibi, is a 2017 Indian Meitei language mythological film, about goddess Phouoibi and other celestial fairies who came down to earth to prosper the human civilization. The film is directed by O. Samananda, starring Lilabati Chanam, Kaiku Rajkumar and Gokul Athokpam, under the collaboration of Kanglei Movies World and Sergey Film Production.

Phouoibi Shayon is considered as the first Manipuri film to complete filming in three days.

== Plot ==
There is a shortage of resources, including food, on earth, as human population increases. Goddess Phouoibi and her divine sisters (goddesses (Note: also described as heavenly or celestial fairies) namely Ngareima, Ereima, Thumleima, among many) are ordered by God Koupalu (Koubru) (Note: In traditional Meitei mythology and Meitei folklore, it was not God Koupalu (Koubru) who ordered the goddesses to go down to earth, but by God Salailen alias Soraren, the deity of sky.) to go down to earth to bless the mankind, with phou (paddy/rice), nga (fish), ee (water), thum (salt), respectively, among many. During the journey, all the sisters get separated from the group, as each prefers to station at certain places favourable to themselves. Finally, Phouoibi reaches Moirang kingdom and meets Akongjamba. The two fall in love with each other. Akongjamba promises her that he will come back, telling her a fixed day and location for the next meeting. But he doesn't. Unable to wait further, Phouoibi goes to his house, where she takes the disguise of a hill tribal woman to hide her divine identity. Akongjamba is absent in his house as he has gone for a work. Phouoibi is given a bad hospitality by Thoidingjambi, a woman in Akongjamba's house. Unable to tolerate the misbehavior any further, Phouoibi shows her true divine powers to Thoidingjambi, by sprinkling a huge amount of paddy that fills the entire courtyard of the house. Then, she leaves the house. Upon returning home, Akongjamba gets to know about Phouoibi's arrival and departure from his own house. He chases after Phouoibi's trails. He finds her on the way and requests her to come back. However, Phouoibi denies Akongjamba's plea. Finally, the two lovers gets separated from each other, until their next reincarnation in the Moirang Shayon.

== Cast ==
- Kaiku Rajkumar
- Lilabati Chanam as Phouoibi

== Theme ==
According to O. Samananda, the director of Phouoibi Shayon, the film is a simple effort to give a contribution towards preservation and lifting of their "culture and traditions" based on the Puyas (ancient Meitei scriptures). He noted that non-indigenous religious groups dominate the state of Manipur, due to which indigenous religion (Sanamahism) is "eclipsed".

He stated,

"In the modern society, there is an intense competition among the various religions of the world which has resulted in the extinction of many indigenous and small religions"

== Production ==
The film was made in a low budget project. It was described by its director as a "deviation from the modern commercial film" of the state. Filming was completed in three days, and is considered as the first of its kind in the cinema of Manipur state.

== Release ==
The film had its initial theatrical release on 2 April 2017, at Shankar Talkies, Lamphel, in Imphal. The film was later made available for public audience in YouTube and other internet platforms.

== See also ==
- List of Meitei-language films
