= Phou Ningthou =

Meitei God of agriculture and crops

- God of agriculture, crops, fertility, grains, harvesting, rice
- Member of agricultural deities
- Other names: Phouningthou
- Affiliation: Sanamahism
- Abodes: Paddy fields and granaries
- Symbol: Rice plant
- Gender: Male
- Region: Manipur)
- Ethnic group: Meitei
- Festivals: Lai Haraoba
- Consort: Phouoibi

Phou Ningthou (Meitei: ꯐꯧ ꯅꯤꯪꯊꯧ, lit. 'king of unhusked rice') is a deity in Sanamahism, the indigenous religion of Manipur). He is the God and the divine male personification of the agriculture, crops, fertility, grains, harvesting, rice paddies, rice and wealth. He is the consort of Phouoibi (Phouleima), the goddess of crops and agricultural fertility.

== Worship ==
Phou Ningthou is worshipped with Phouoibi, the goddess of rice. Farmers prayed to the two deities for a doubling of the previous year's yield, after the harvest.

Phoukourol (Phoukouron or Phougourol or Phougouron) is a sacred hymn to call the spirit of the paddy. It is generally sung during harvesting. It is done before the harvested crops are stored in the grain house.

The Phou Kouba (calling the paddy/rice) ceremony is usually performed during mis-happenings to the farmers. Mis-happenings may be theft or burning of the paddy/rice, an animal like cow trespasses the threshing ground, etc. People perform the rites and rituals to induce the deity to stay at their places.

Sareng (Wallago attu, helicopter catfish) with rice is the most important offering to the deity. It should be cooked with herbs and not with spices.
