= Mongba Hanba =

Forest god in Meitei mythology and religion

- Forest God
- Member of Umang Lais
- Major cult center: Mahabali Hanuman Thakur Temple Complex, Imphal East district, Manipur
- Abode: Mongba Hanba Umang
- Gender: Male
- Region: Manipur
- Ethnic group: Meitei
- Festivals: Lai Haraoba

Equivalents
- Hindu: Hanuman

Mongba Hanba (Meitei: ꯃꯣꯡꯕ ꯍꯟꯕ) is a forest god in Sanamahism, the indigenous religion of Manipur. He is mainly worshipped in the sacred forest Mongba Hanba Umang on the banks of the Imphal River.

== History ==
On Saturday, the 16th day of the Meitei lunar month of Inga, 1729, (during the reign of King Garib Niwaj Pamheiba), nine Umang Lais were brought and gathered at the Mongba Hanba's sacred forest and buried there, and a stone idol of the Hindu God Hanuman was installed. So, the cult of Mongba Hanba was replaced by that of Hanuman.

On 6 June 1979, an association was formed to save Mongba Hanba Umang. It struggled for controlling the sacred place for worshipping the traditional deity. There have been repeated attempts to revive the pantheon of the deity. However, there is opposition from the religious body of the Mahabali Temple of Hanuman.

During May 2015, an organization named Mongba Hanba Umang Laipham Kanba Lup appealed not to stop them from constructing a place of worship for God Mongba Hanba. The organization claimed that in 36 years, it had never prevented devotees of Hanuman from worshipping. The organization expected the same thing from the Hindu bodies not to stop them from establishing a place of worship for God Mongba Hanba in the complex.

== Worship ==
According to religious custom, Tampak Maiba was to worship God Mongba Hanba (Old Manipuri: Mongpa Hanpa). The atmosphere of blood sacrifice is said to be associated with the shrine of the deity.
