= Apokpa =

Ancient Meitei deity

- Ancestral deity of families and clans
- Member of Meitei deities
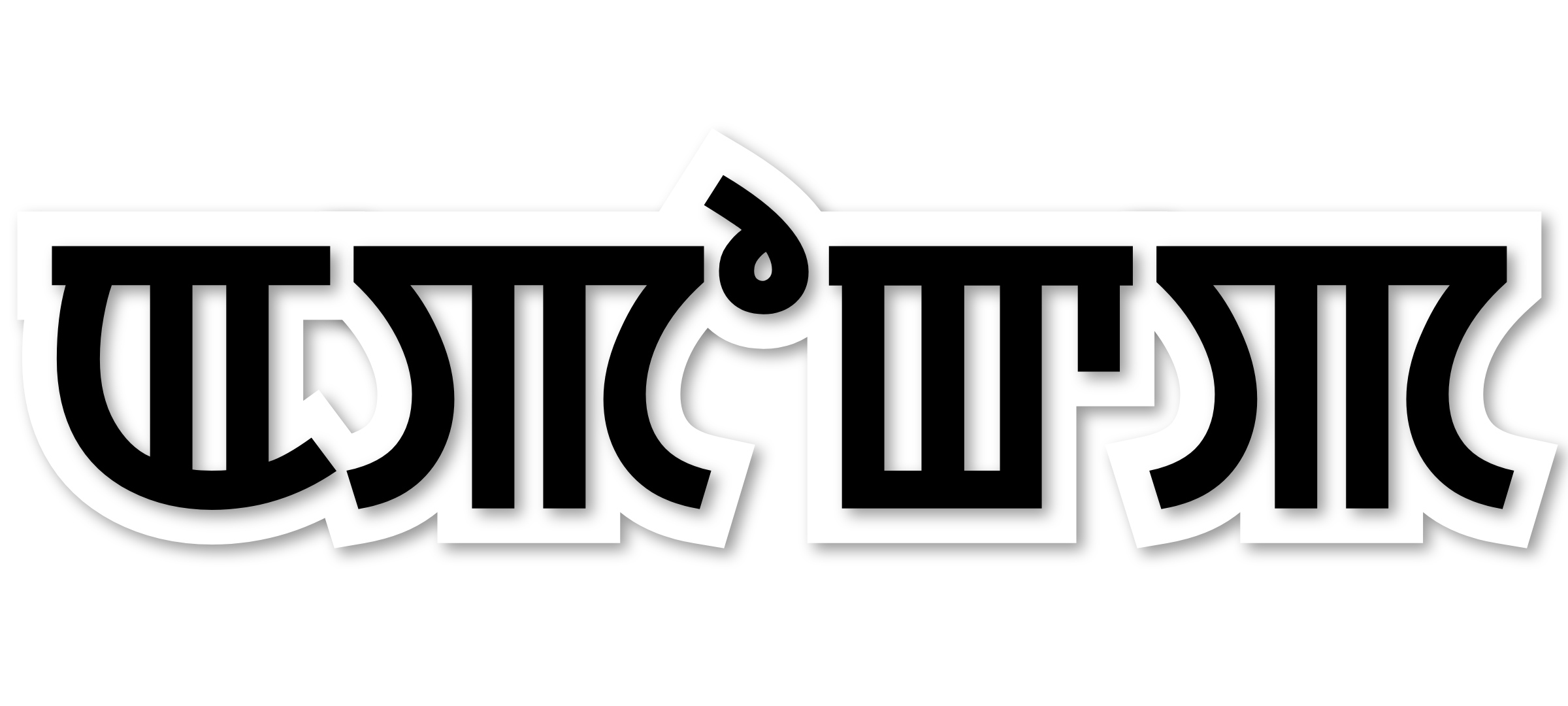
- Affiliation: Meitei religion (Sanamahism)
- Abodes: House of the respective family or clan
- Region: India (Manipur, Assam and Tripura), Bangladesh and Myanmar
- Ethnic group: Meitei ethnicity

An Apokpa or an Apokpi is an ancestral deity belonging to one particular clan or family, often prevailed in the Meitei religion (Sanamahism).

Each of the seven clans and the families of the Meitei ethnicity worship their ancestors having separate pantheons dedicated to them.

== See also ==
- Apokpa Marup
