= Phou-oibi, the Rice Goddess =

2013 Meitei language ballad opera

- Epic cycles of incarnations by Laihui Ensemble
- A theatrical poster for the "Phou-oibi, the Rice Goddess" in Singapore
- Other title: Phou-oibi, Phou-oibee
- Language: Meitei (officially called Manipuri)
- Based on: Meitei mythology and folklore
- Premiere: 2013; Tapestry of Sacred Music 2013 in Singapore

Phou-oibi, the Rice Goddess is a 2013 Meitei language ballad opera, based on the story of goddess Phouoibi, adapted from Meitei mythology and folklore, performed by the Laihui Ensemble from Manipur, India, as a part of the "Tapestry of Sacred Music 2013" programme, held at the Esplanade in Singapore.

== Plot ==
The ballad opera "Phou-oibi, the Rice Goddess" tells the divine narratives of different goddesses, associated with fish, land, metal, water, wealth and after all of rice, goddess Phouoibi, who are sent down to earth by the Supreme God to prosper the human civilization. On her way, Phouoibi meets Akongjamba in the ancient kingdom of Moirang and both fall in love with each other.

== See also ==
- Music of Manipur
- Nura Pakhang (Eu e Tu)
- Shakuhachi meets Pena
