= Ngareima =

Ngaleima
- Goddess of fish
- Member of Lairembis
- Other names: Lemlei Ngaleima; Lemlei Ngareima
- Affiliation: Sanamahism
- Abode: Underwater world
- Animals: Fish
- Symbol: Fish
- Texts: PuYas
- Gender: Female
- Region: Manipur
- Ethnic group: Meitei
- Festivals: Lai Haraoba

Genealogy
- Parents: Salailen (father)
- Siblings: Phouoibi; Thumleima; Ereima

Equivalents
- Greek: Amphitrite
- Roman: Salacia

Ngareima is the goddess of fish and aquatic life in Sanamahism, the indigenous religion of Manipur. She is a sister (or friend) of the goddesses, Phouoibi, Thumleima and Ereima.

== Myths ==
Menstrual blood, hay, rice stalks, hentak (edible fish paste), and broom are considered profane to Ngaleima. So, if there is an adverse entry of fish into the fishing nets, the presence of menstruating woman is highly suspected at the spot, especially on the floating dam. Other suspicious reasons are the dropping down of the charoo (hay, dried paddy stalks) or hentak (edible fish paste) or sumjit (broom) by people out of jealousy into the place.

Ngareima is considered to be one of the divine manifestations of Leimarel Sidabi, the supreme mother earth goddess. It is said that Leimalel becomes Ngaleima when she is in the fish yard.

== In popular culture ==
- Phou-oibi, the rice goddess is a 2009 ballad opera performed by the Laihui Ensemble. It is based on the story of the goddess and her sister Phouoibi.
- Phouoibi Shayon is a 2017 Manipuri language movie based on the story of the goddess and her sister Phouoibi.
