= Maibi =

Priestess in Sanamahism

Maibi are the priestesses of Manipur Kingdom commonly known for performing religious rites. They are considered as shamans as well as midwives. They possess various skills of religious activities and ancient medicinal knowledge.

Rank	Maibis	Salai	Deities worshipped
1	ꯁꯪꯂꯦꯟ, Shanglen	ꯃꯉꯥꯡ, Mangang	ꯄꯥꯈꯪꯕ, Pakhangba
2	ꯅꯣꯡꯃꯥꯢ, Nongmai	ꯂꯨꯋꯥꯡ, Luwang	ꯌꯨꯝꯖꯥꯎ ꯂꯩꯃ, Yumjao Leima
3	ꯐꯨꯔꯥ, Phura	ꯈꯨꯃꯟ, Khuman Salai	ꯅꯣꯡꯁꯥꯕ, Nongshaba

The male counterpart is a Maiba.

== See also ==
- Sanamahism
