= Phouoibi =

- Goddess of agriculture, crops, fertility, grains, harvesting, paddy, rice and wealth
- Member of Lairembis
- Other names: Fouoibi, Fouoipi, Fouleima, Foureima, Phouoipi, Phouleima, Phoureima
- Affiliation: Epic cycles of incarnations, Meitei mythology and Sanamahism
- Abodes: Farms and Fields
- Artifacts: Round black stone kept inside a pot
- Symbol: Paddy
- Texts: Phouoibi Warol
- Gender: Female
- Region: Ancient Kangleipak (early Manipur)
- Ethnic group: Meitei ethnicity
- Festivals: Lai Haraoba

Genealogy
- Parents: Salailen (father)
- Siblings: Thumleima, Ngaleima and Ereima (Ireima)
- Consort: Phou Ningthou

Equivalents
- Greek: Demeter
- Roman: Ceres

Phouoibi or Phouleima is the goddess and the female personification of the agriculture, crops, fertility, grains, harvest, paddy, rice and wealth in Meitei mythology and religion of Ancient Kangleipak (early Manipur). She is the lover of Akongjamba, a hero in ancient legends. But fate does not permit the lovers to unite. So, Phouoibi and Akongjamba reincarnated in the legends. She was sent by Thangching to Moirang kingdom to make the human world prosperous. The legends of her love with Akongjamba were believed to be enacted by Thangching as a part of the Moirang Saiyon legends.

Phouoibi is a spirit of the rice. So, she is not a member of the Umang Lais.

The characters of Phouoibi and other goddesses, including Panthoibi and Emoinu, depict, as well as influence, the boldness, courage, independence, righteousness and social honour of Meitei women. The Meitei people believe that the gleaming black stone is a personification of the goddess, which if kept inside the earthenware pot of the granary, will bring good luck and prosperity, as long as it shines.

== Etymology ==
Phouoibi or Phouleima literally means Lady of the Paddy in Meitei (Manipuri). Phou (Fou) means "unhusked rice", paddy. "Oibi" is derived from the verb "oiba" (meaning "to become") with the feminine suffix "i".

== Description ==
Phouoibi is a goddess who is very fickle in love. She fell in love with many mortals. However, she does not live permanently with anyone of them. She went to many places and had sex with many mortals only to discard them later. She lived with her favorite lover for some time and later left him. Her nature symbolizes that wealth does not last long. There were frequent wars and natural calamities in ancient times. So, the goddess of paddy is described as very inconstant in favouring to the mankind.

According to Meitei culture, the anger of Phouoibi was provoked with the neglect of paddy or rice. The rites and rituals dedicated to the goddess were regularly performed. By doing this, possible misfortunes were warded off that could have came to the peasants.

== Mythology ==
Once Phouoibi (Fouoibi) set out for a journey along with her sisters (friends in another version), Ngaleima and Thumleima. In Moirang, when the goddess was about to cross a river, Akongjamba came to the spot for hunting. Akongjamba and Phouoibi fell in love at first sight.

After some time passed, Phouoibi visited the house of Akongjamba. She disguised herself as a tribal woman (haonupi or haonubi). Akongjamba was not there but Akongjamba's mother did not give her good hospitality. Akongjamba's mother was about to hit Phouoibi (disguised as a tribal woman) with a swiping broom. Since a divine being could lose their powers at the touch of profane objects, Phouoibi fled to a coop (henhouse). She transfigured herself as a chicken. Akongjamba's mother followed her and counted the number of chicken. She found the number of chicken exactly as it was, neither more nor less. So, she went back to her home. Phouoibi spent the night inside the filthy and smelly henhouse. On the next day, she once again took her original form of a beautiful maiden in a glowing dress. She called Akongjamba's mother to come out. She told her that she wanted to give her the payment for spending a night at hers. She shook an enormous heap of golden grain off her body in the middle of the front yard of the house. Then, Phouoibi left the place travelling towards south east. Akongjamba's mother remained surprised.

In another version of the story, Phouoibi stayed a night at the yenakha (left or right side of the house). The place where the goddess stayed came to be known as Phayeng (fai or phai means to stay).

Later, Akongjamba returned home and found the pile of golden grain as high as a hill in front of the courtyard. When asked, his mother told him all the story. He realised that the lady was Phouoibi. He followed and caught up with her. He pleaded her to return home and live together. But she refused his proposal. She told him that they are not destined to be together to accomplish their work at that birth. Saying this, she left him sorrowfully.

As Phouoibi travelled towards southeast, she reached a riverbank. She did not know how deep the river was. At that moment, a deer appeared on the other side of the river. She asked the deer if the river was shallow or not. The deer lied telling her that the river was not deep. Phouoibi went down the river. She could not swim and got drowned.

A small ngamhai fish was also swimming there. It helped the drowning goddess to reach the shore of the next riverbank. She thanked the little creature and granted it a boon that it will shine like a mirror in the gleaming water. She wished that the ballad singers will always praise the fish for its silvery beauty whenever they retold her story.

Then, she glared at the deer. She cursed the deer and all its species that if they tried to eat her creation, paddy, then all their teeth will be fallen. So, still today, deer never eat paddy because of the fear that their teeth will fall out.

== Worship ==
Poinu (November-December interface month) is the Meitei lunar month of harvesting and the granary must not be disturbed. Its subsequent month Wakching (December-January interface month) is the time during which Goddess Phouoibi is worshipped.

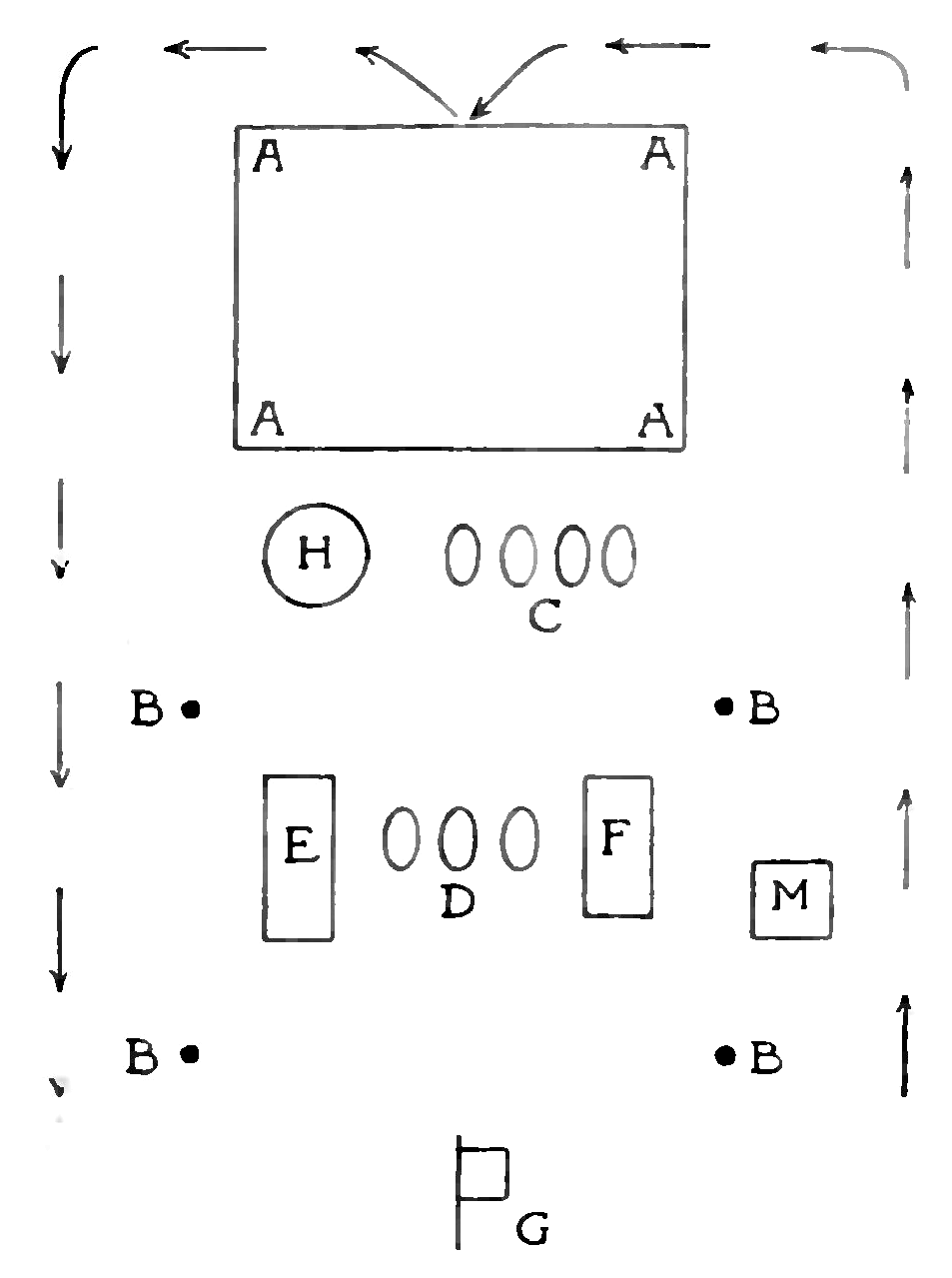
Plan of the ceremony dedicated to goddess Phauwoibi, sketch drawn by Col. John Shakespear in 1913: 1. A mat with the offerings of fruits and vegetables at the four corners.; 2. Poles supporting a white canopy.; 3. Vegetables and a Sareng fish offered to the goddess.; 4. Seven varieties of paddy.; 5. Offerings to the seven Lairembis, on a cloth.; 6. Offerings to the nine Umang Lais.; 7. A flag.; 8. A pot in which to cook the offerings.; 13. The Maiba.

Goddess Phouoibi is offered fruits and vegetables in the four corners of a specially prepared place. The place is divided into three sections. At each division, seeds are sown. The goddess is invoked by the maibas with the sacrifice of black hen and the offering of rice beer.

If the previous year's crop harvest was good, the maiba prayed to the goddess to give them good crops that year too. And if the previous year's crop harvest was not satisfactory, the maiba prayed to the goddess to give them satisfactory crops with no insects that year.

Rice and flowers on the banana leaves are thrown up on the harvest field by the farmers.

After threshing, Phou Kouba (calling the paddy/rice) ceremony is performed. Phoukourol (Phoukouron or Phougourol or Phougouron) is a hymn for summoning the spirit of the paddy.

Phoukou (Phougou) song is sung like this:

"He Lairemma Phouoibi!
Toi Toi Toi
Thangee Phoubi Peibiro!
Toi Toi Toi
Chaku Lankubiro!
Toi Toi Toi
Thangeena Chingdum Sabiro!
Toi Toi Toi
Ho Lairemma Phouoibi!
Toi Toi Toi"

To have abundant crop harvest, the Meitei people sing Phougou Eshei.

It is generally sung during harvest. It is done before the crop is stored in the granary. Goddess Phouoibi is worshipped with Phou Ningthou, the god of rice. Farmers prayed to the two deities for a doubling of the previous year's yield, after the harvest.

The Phou Kouba (calling the paddy/rice) ceremony is more frequently performed in case of mis-happenings to the farmers. Mis-happenings may be theft or burning of the paddy/rice, an animal like cow trespasses the threshing ground, etc. People believe that these are all because of the absence of the goddess. So, they perform the rites and rituals to induce the goddess to stay at their places.

In such cases, Sareng fish (Wallago attu, helicopter catfish) with rice is the most important offering to goddess Phouoibi. It should be cooked with herbs and not with spices.

The Sharotkhaibam (Sorokhaibam) family members used to invoke goddess Phouoibi in ancient times.

== Association with other goddesses ==
Phouoibi is often identified as a manifestation of the Goddess Panthoibi. Many legends say that Panthoibi became Phouoibi after a metamorphosis. She is also regarded as the incarnation of Leimarel Sidabi, the supreme mother earth goddess.

== Iconography ==
The goddess Phouleima often appears in ancient potteries. She is signified as a round black stone sitting in a pot. It is placed upon the bed of rice grains inside the granary. It is never kept directly on the ground. As long as the goddess is respected, the granary has no lack of grains.

== Texts ==
The Phouoibi Waron is a 13–14th century Meitei literary work that calls Phouoibi a fickle lady. According to the text, the goddess has love affairs with multiple partners and she always leaves them.

The Ningthourol Lambuba relates that Phouoibi and her six friends went to a place called Karan Lambuba. They measured all their walking sticks to see whose was the longest. Phouoibi was found to be the longest of all, by one knot. So, one knot was cut off. The place where the stick was cut off was named Kakmayai (kak means to cut in Manipuri).

The Loyumba Shinyen mentions that people of a family named Sharotkhaibam used to invoke the goddess of paddies in ancient times.

== In popular culture ==
- Phou-oibi, the rice goddess is a 2009 ballad opera performed by the Laihui Ensemble. It is based on the story of the goddess and her sisters.
- Phouoibi Shayon is a 2017 Manipuri mythology film based on the story of the goddess and her sisters.

== Namesakes ==
In 1979, two new rice high-yield varieties, Phouoibi (KD6-2-1) and Punshi (KD6-18-7), were developed by the Manipur State Rice Research Center, Wangbal. After these rice varieties became available, they were planted in 75 percent of high-yield rice growing areas. Phouoibi matures in 135 days. These rice varieties are more likely to be affected by insects than local varieties like Phourel and Moirang Phou.

Ima Keithel (English: Mothers' Market), the world's only market run by women, has three major building complexes. Phouoibi Ima Keithel isComplex Number 3, preceded by Leimarel Sidabi Ima Keithel (Complex Number 1) and Imoinu Ima Keithel (Complex Number 2). This 500 years old market is in the center of Imphal, the main city of the State of Manipur.
