= Meitei mythology =

Mythology of the Meitei people of South Asia

Meitei (Manipuri) mythology
- Cultural origins: Meitei culture

Subgenres
- Epic cycles of incarnations

Related topics
- Sanamahism, Meitei folklore, Meitei literature, Meitei cinema

Meitei mythology (or Manipuri mythology) (Meitei: Meitei Mi Lai Tingi Wari) is a collection of myths belonging to the religious and cultural traditions of the Meitei people, a Tibeto-Burman ethnic group native to the Indian state of Manipur. Meitei mythology is associated with the traditional Meitei religion of Sanamahism. Meitei myths explain various natural phenomena, how human civilization developed, and the reasons for many events.

== Textual sources ==
Mythical narration plays an integral role in nearly every genre of Meitei literature (Manipuri literature). Some of the best known literary sources are:

Ancient texts	Description
Khongjomnubi Nongarol	Legends of six girls turning into the Pleiades in the sky
Konthoujam Nongarol	Legends of Konthoujam Tampha Lairembi
Leishemlon	Creation myth
Leithak Leikharol	The creation of the world, genealogy of kings, moral teachings and mythology
Panthoibi Khongul	Romantic adventures of the Goddess Panthoibi and the God Nongpok Ningthou
Phouoibi Waron	Legends of the multitude of loves of Goddess Phouoibi
Poireiton Khunthok	Legend of the human civilization on earth led by Poireiton and Leinaotabi from the underworld.
Sakok Lamlen	A sequel to Leithak Leikharol.

== Mythical beings ==
Mythical beings include gods, goddesses, mythical creatures and many others.
