= Hangoi =

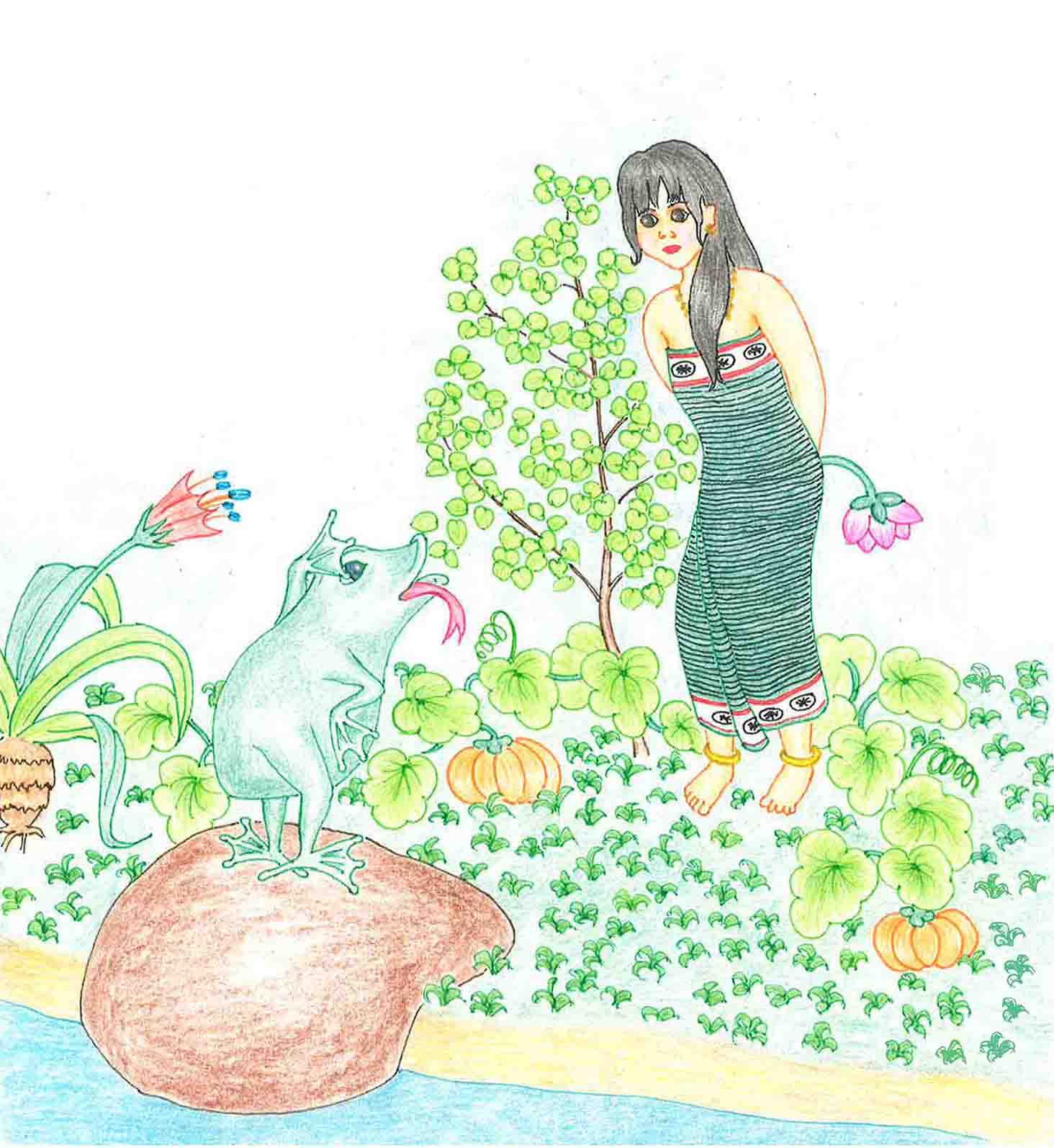
A Meitei princess and a Hangoi (Frog) in a Meitei folktale

Hangoi (ꯍꯉꯣꯏ), also known as Hangngoi or Hang-ngoi (ꯍꯪꯉꯣꯏ / ꯍꯡꯉꯣꯏ), are frogs or toads in the Meitei language of Manipur. Hangoi are significant characters in the Meitei arts, folklore, and mythology, and are often depicted as clever, resourceful, or morally instructive in traditional stories.

== In creation myths ==
In Meitei cosmology, the Supreme Creator God entrusted his son, Lainingthou Sanamahi, with the task of creating humans. During this process, Sanamahi produced a variety of creatures that did not meet the Creator’s expectations for what constituted a human being. Among these early creations was the frog, or Hang-ngoi. The frog occupies an important place in the narrative as one of the pre-human beings, showing the experimental stages of creation prior to the formation of humans.

=== In the Wakoklon text ===
Hangoi or “frog” is referenced in the Wakoklon Heelel Thilel Salai Amailon Pukok Puya, a holy and sacred manuscript text of Sanamahism, the indigenous religion of the Meitei civilisation. According to the text, Sitapa Mapu, literally “Immortal Master” or “Immortal Owner”, the Supreme Creator God, gave various beings with a soul (thouwai or thawai) during the primordial era, rather than creating them ex nihilo. Hangoi is mentioned alongside humans, fish, monkeys, insects, and other animals, as part of a cosmology in which all living beings possess a soul and participate in the divine order. Specifically, the manuscript text mentions humans (Mee), animals or beasts (Sa), fish (Nga), monkeys or apes (Yong), insects (Teel), mosquitoes (Kang), and other creatures such as grasshoppers (Kaucheng), houseflies (Haying), fruit flies (Tumit), and several additional beings referred to as Wahi, Khalou, and Khoiya. These entities are described as existing simultaneously with humans, showing a conception of the natural world in which all life forms are spiritually animated and integral to the primordial creation ordained by Sitapa Mapu.

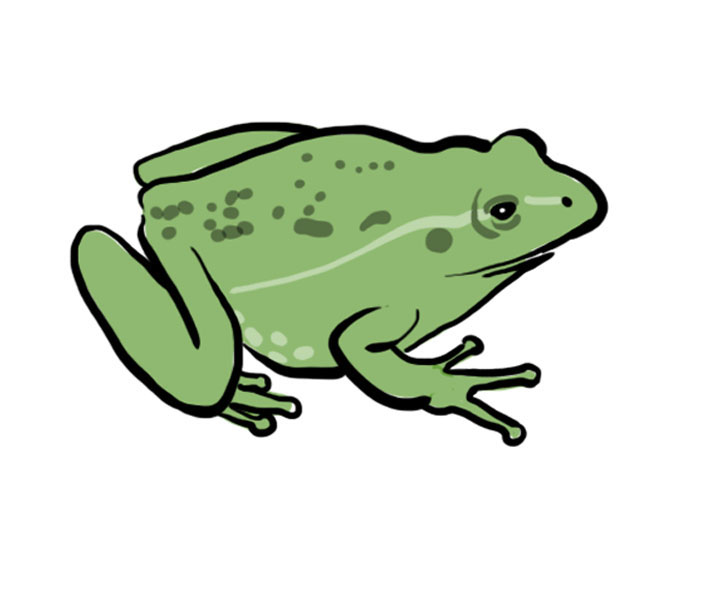
Frog illustration

== In folktales ==
Hangoi appears in several notable Meitei folktales, including:

- Kei amadi Shamu bu Hangoi na Maithiba Piba (“The Clever Frog Defeats Tiger and Elephant”), in which Hangoi uses wit to overcome larger and stronger animals.
- Lukhrabi amadi Hangoi (“The Widow and the Frog”), also known as Lukhrabi Macha Hangoi Porabi (Toad, Widow’s Son), which shows themes of kindness, cleverness, and the interaction between humans and animals.

These tales show the cultural importance of Hangoi as both a symbolic and narrative figure in Meitei oral tradition.

=== Kei Amadi Shamu bu Hangoi na Maithiba Piba ===
Kei Amadi Shamu bu Hangoi na Maithiba Piba (The Frog Defeats the Tiger and the Elephant) is a Meitei folktale from ancient Kangleipak (early Manipur). The main character of the story is Hangoi, the frog (or toad), who uses intelligence to overcome stronger animals.

In the story, a tiger and an elephant meet in a forest while searching for food. They do not respect each other. A fight takes place, and the tiger defeats the elephant. The tiger captures the elephant but does not kill it because it is not hungry at that time. While being held captive, the elephant sees Hangoi nearby and calls out loudly. Hangoi becomes angry at the elephant’s tone. Hangoi then proposes a race to decide who is greater. The elephant agrees. When the race begins, Hangoi secretly climbs onto the elephant. Near the end of the race, Hangoi jumps ahead and reaches the finish point first. Hangoi is declared the winner. After this, Hangoi and the elephant become friends. Later, the tiger finds that the elephant is no longer under its control. The tiger becomes angry and meets Hangoi. They argue and decide to have a race. Hangoi uses the same method as before and wins again. After losing to Hangoi, the tiger leaves.

The story presents Hangoi as intelligent and resourceful. The main idea of the folktale is that intelligence can be more effective than physical strength.

=== Lukhrabi Amadi Hangoi ===
Lukhrabi Amadi Hangoi (transl. The Widow and the Frog), also known as Lukhrabi Macha Hangoi Porabi (Toad, Widow’s Son), is a traditional Meitei folktale from the Meitei oral tradition of Manipur. The narrative centers on a supernatural frog who becomes the principal agent of transformation, justice, and social reversal within the tale. Unlike many folktales where the animal figure is passive or enchanted without agency, the frog in Lukhrabi Amadi Hangoi drives the narrative forward through deliberate action, strategic persistence, and the use of hidden magical power.

The story recounts how a frog possessing divine or supernatural abilities chooses to enter the life of a solitary widow. Observing her loneliness and industrious character, the frog proposes that they live together as mother and son. The widow accepts, and the frog becomes her adopted child. From this point onward, the frog assumes an active and purposeful role. After hearing descriptions of the king’s daughter, he resolves to marry her. The frog repeatedly instructs his mother to approach the king with a formal proposal. Despite the king’s refusals and the public humiliation inflicted upon the widow—including physical assault ordered by the king—the frog remains unwavering. The second rejection marks a turning point. When the widow returns injured and humiliated, the frog’s response is not defeat but resolve. He insists upon a third approach, this time offering to meet any condition imposed by the king and to accept any punishment if he fails. The king, intrigued by the frog’s persistence, sets seemingly impossible demands: the construction of a palace equal to his own within a single night, surrounded by flourishing gardens, adorned with gold and silver pathways, and staffed by hundreds of attendants. Failure would result in execution. During the night, while the widow sleeps, the frog reveals his concealed power. Producing jewels and precious stones from within his body, he invokes supernatural forces to manifest the palace and its grandeur exactly as demanded. By morning, the conditions are fulfilled, and the king is compelled to honor his promise. The frog marries the princess. On the wedding night, the princess dreams of a prince walking with her in a garden. Upon waking, she discovers the frog’s discarded skin. When she burns it, the frog’s true form is permanently revealed as a handsome prince. The frog’s animal form is thus understood to have been a temporary state or enchantment.

== In art ==
Frog imagery appears prominently in classical Meitei manuscript art from the 18th and 19th centuries, particularly in the Subika Laisaba text. One notable illustration depicts a human figure rendered with frog-like characteristics. While the figure retains all anatomical features of a human, its surface is textured with polka dots to evoke the appearance of a frog. The eyes remain distinctly human, producing a hybrid impression of a human-frog. The artwork employs a limited palette of Indian red, black, and yellow ochre, showing the characteristic color scheme of Meitei artists of the period. This illustration is considered one of the more unusual and imaginative creations in historical Meitei art. In an adjacent panel, another composition combines the images of a frog, a fish, and a human being in close proximity. Human traits are shown in the hands, head, and torso. The developmental stages of a frog, from egg to maturity, are shown through the use of tails and limbs. By slightly rotating the composition (approximately 45°) and adjusting the depiction of the head and tail portions, the figure can also be interpreted as a fish. Similar to the frog-human hybrid, this artwork uses Indian red, black, and yellow ochre, showing a regular aesthetic and color usage in Meitei manuscript illustrations. These artworks show the inventive visual language of Meitei artists, combining elements of human and animal forms to explore themes of transformation and hybridity.

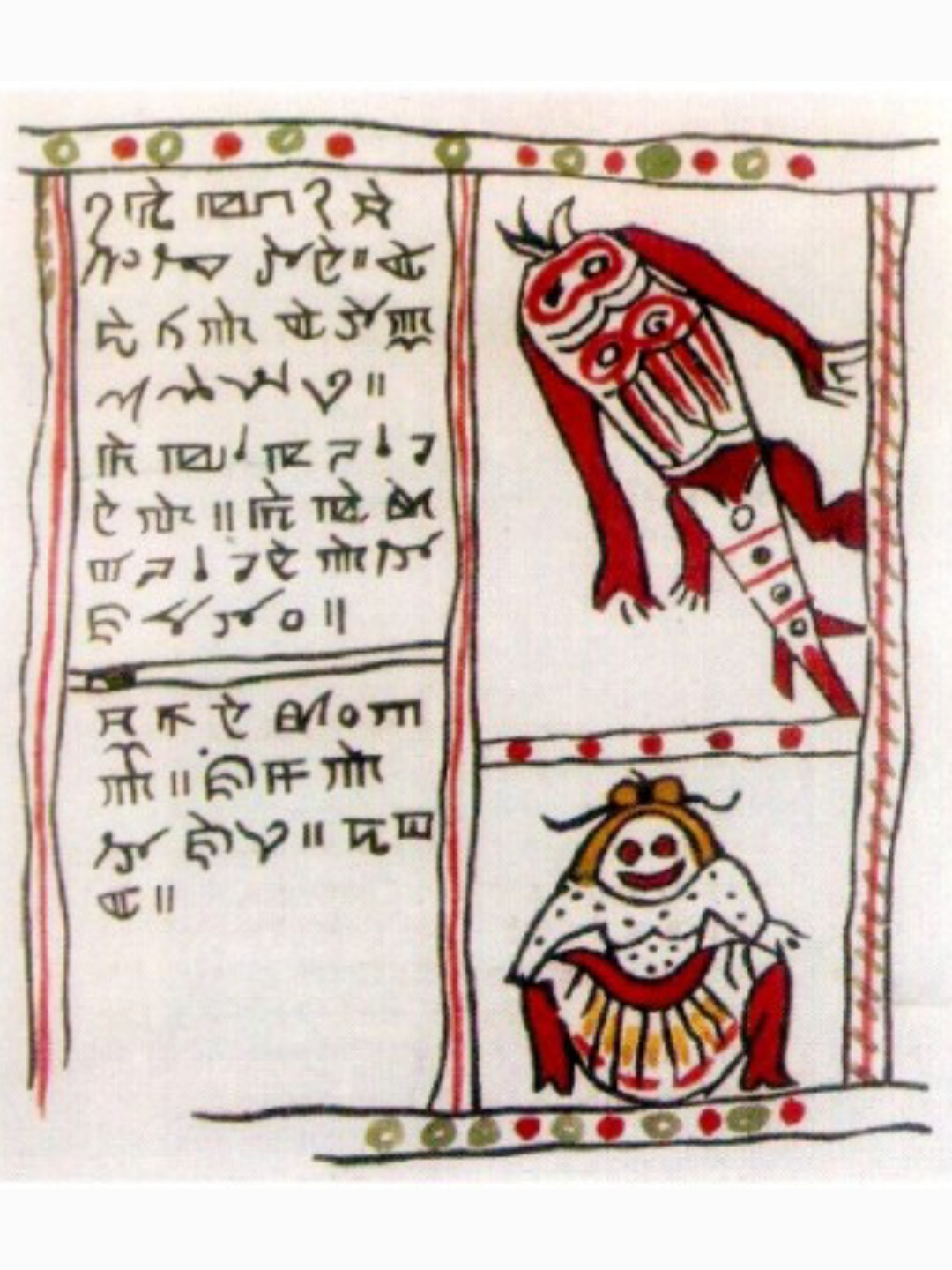
Depictions of a frog-like figure and a human figure in the illustrations from the Subika (ꯁꯨꯕꯤꯀꯥ), an 18-19th century Meitei language manuscript in Meitei script (18 × 12 cm)

== In archery ==
In Meitei traditional weaponry, people in ancient Kangleipak (early Meitei civilization) used a special kind of arrows known as the Hangoi Taokapli, for shooting at frogs, floating in the water bodies, like ponds, lakes, etc. for practicing archery to improve accuracy in target shooting.

== In literature ==
- Brojeshwor (1975). Hangoi Khongbadasu Lingga Khongbadasu (in Manipuri). Manipur University Library, Imphal. Internet Archive; Digital Library of India.

== See also ==
- Frogs in culture
- The Frog Prince
- Shamu (Meitei culture)
- Houdong
- Meitei Hui
- Meitei Nganu
- Meetei San
