= Meitei Hui =

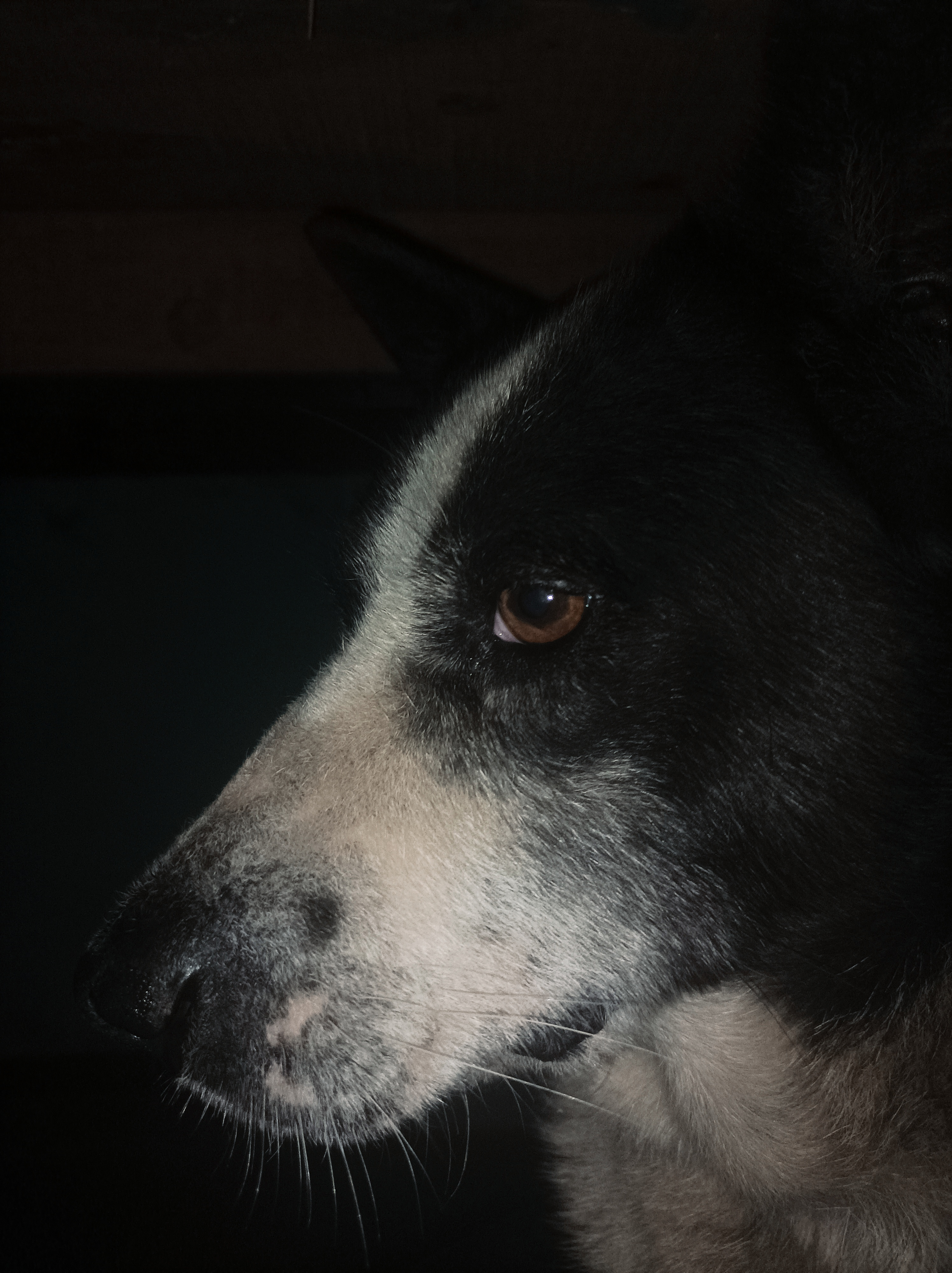
- An individual Meitei Hui dog
- Common nicknames: Meetei Hui
- Origin: India
- Distribution: Manipur, northeast India
- Notes: "Hui" means dog in Meitei language (Manipuri language)

Meitei Hui (ꯃꯩꯇꯩ ꯍꯨꯏ), also spelled as Meitei Huei, is a lesser-known indigenous dog variety from the Indian state of Manipur. It is traditionally domesticated by the eponymous Meitei people. It has often been undervalued and poorly recognized compared to non-native dog breeds.

== Background ==
The Meitei Hui is believed to have been domesticated by early Meitei communities in the Imphal Valley of Manipur. As these communities began practicing agriculture, they also tamed local wild wolves, which gave rise to the Meitei Hui dog. This process of domestication is estimated to have occurred around 10,000 years ago, contributing to the development of settled and more organized societies in the region.

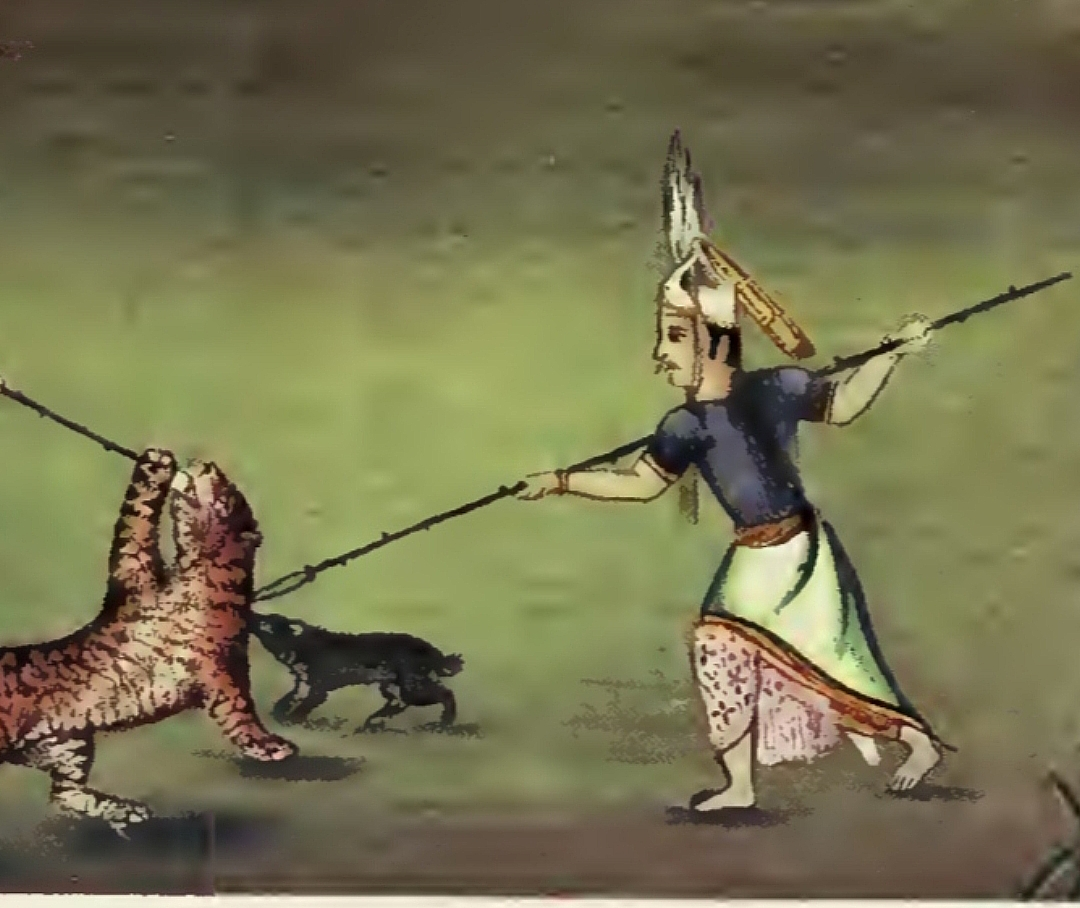
Meitei people have been using local dogs in hunting since ancient times.

The Meitei Hui has traditionally lived alongside local communities in Manipur. Over time, local dogs were sometimes regarded as inferior or lacking intelligence. However, observations and public events involving Meitei Hui dogs have challenged this perception.

== Public recognition ==
In 2004, the Meitei Hui was featured in the first organized canine show in Imphal, held at the Polo Ground. The breed participated alongside four local Awang Huijao dogs and more than 150 other dogs. The event, organized by the United Kennel Club of Manipur, marked one of the earliest public recognitions of the Meitei Hui in a formal exhibition setting.

A major moment in public recognition of the Meitei Hui occurred on 14 February 2004 at the First All Breed Dog Show Championship, held at Mapal Kangjeibung, Imphal. During this event, a Meitei Hui dog named Jone, owned by Nongmeikapam Jotin, a resident of Thongju Part II, Imphal East district, participated in the competition.

Jone received the Best of the Breed award at the show. The award drew attention from a large audience and helped increase local awareness and acceptance of the Meitei Hui as a capable and competitive dog variety.

== Conservation awareness efforts ==
Following the public recognition of Jone, Nongmeikapam Jotin carried out long-term awareness activities to promote the protection of indigenous dog breeds in Manipur. He led a campaign known as “Hui Chaba Toklase”, which focused on discouraging the killing and consumption of local dogs and encouraging respect for indigenous breeds.

As part of this campaign, Jotin visited various meat shops along with his Meitei Hui dog named Jone, to raise public awareness about indigenous dogs and their value. These activities became one of the more visible efforts connected with the Meitei Hui.

== Perception and abilities ==
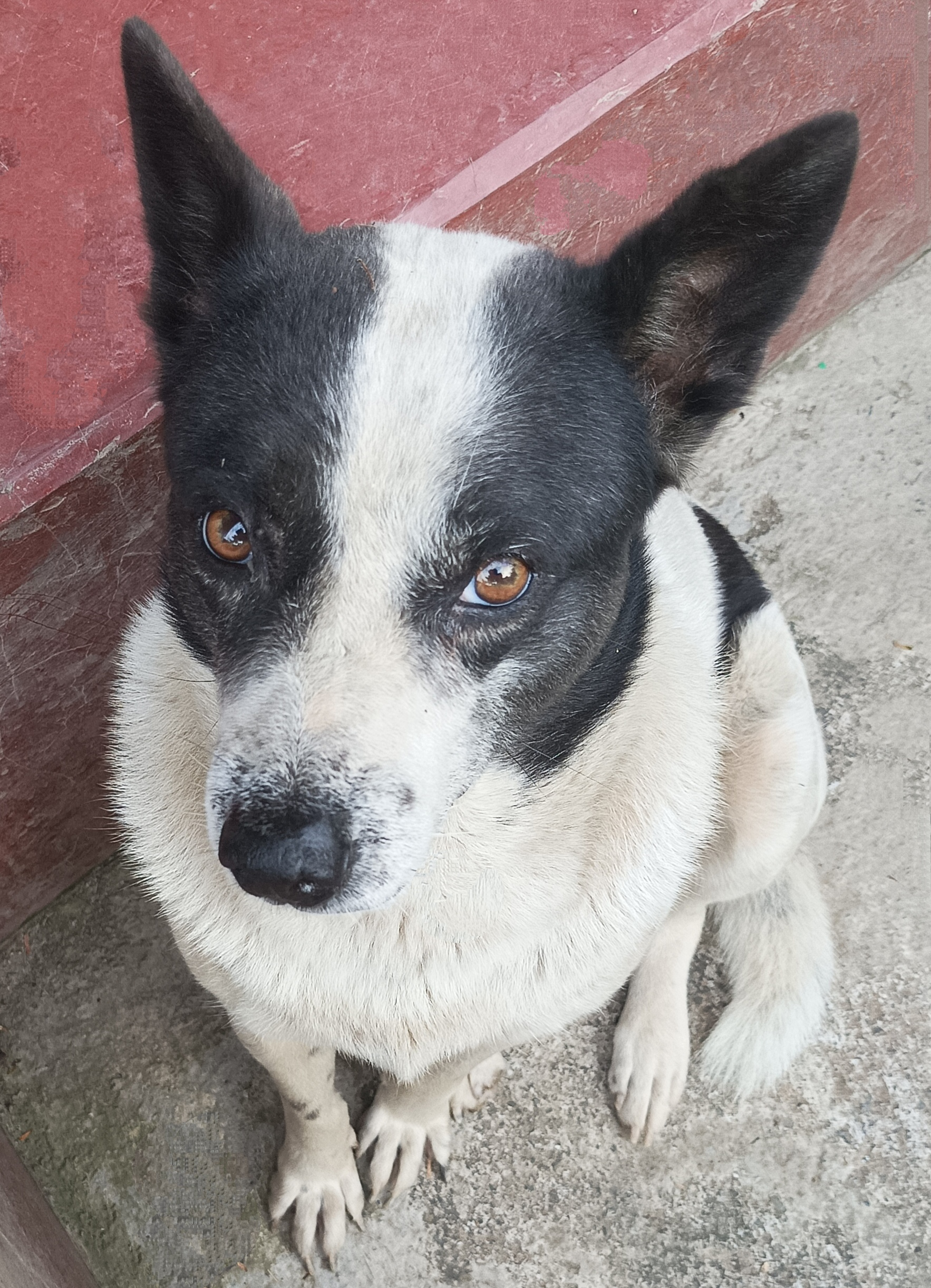
A photograph of an individual from the Meitei Hui dog breed

Public demonstrations and participation in dog shows helped counter the belief that local dogs, including Meitei Hui, are unintelligent or incapable. The performance of Jone in competitive settings was often cited locally as evidence of the breed's ability.

== Participation in dog welfare events ==
The Manipur Dog Lovers Club (MDLC) organized a Festival of Dogs, also called a Canine Carnival, at Hapta Kangjeibung, Imphal, under the themes “Stop Dog Meat” and “Health First”. Meitei Hui dogs were among the breeds presented during the event, highlighting their presence in dog welfare and awareness programs in the state.

== See also ==
- Shamu (Meitei culture)
- Houdong
- Meitei folktales
