= Pebet =

Pebet may refer to:

- Pebet (bird), a bird species mentioned in Meitei mythology
- Pebet (cultivar), of karuka, a tree
