= Houdong =

Cats in Meitei culture

Houdong (Meitei: ꯍꯧꯗꯣꯡ)
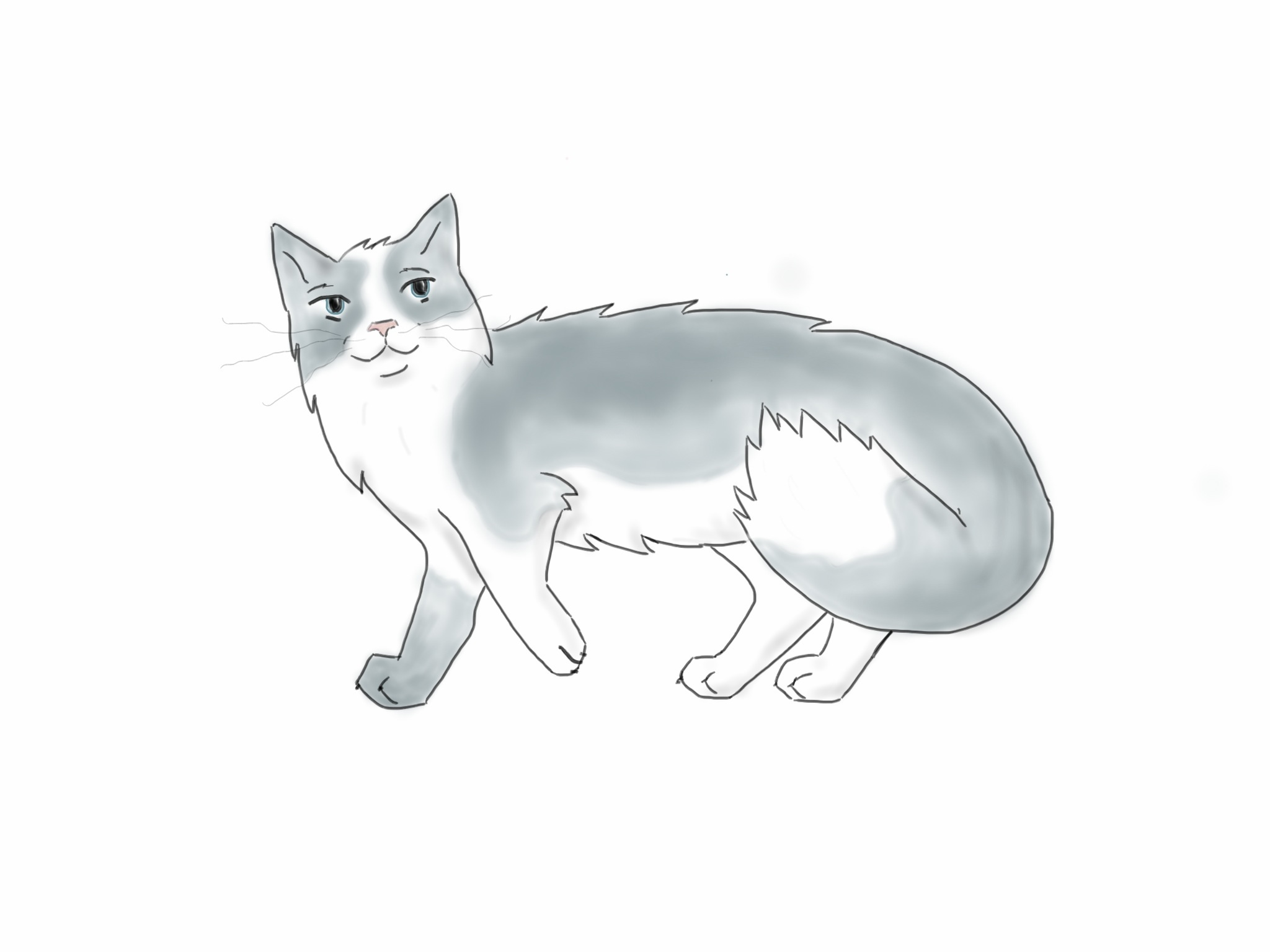
- A Houdong (transl. the cat)

Creature information
- Other name(s): Haudong, Houtong, Hautong
- Grouping: Animal
- Sub grouping: Cat
- Similar entities: Keibu Keioiba
- Family: Felines
- Folklore: Meitei folklore

Origin
- Country: India
- Region: Manipur

Houdong (transl. the cat), sometimes spelled as Haudong, appears frequently in Meitei mythology and Meitei folktales of the Meitei folklore of Ancient Kangleipak (early Manipur).

== Houdong Lamboiba and Pebet ==
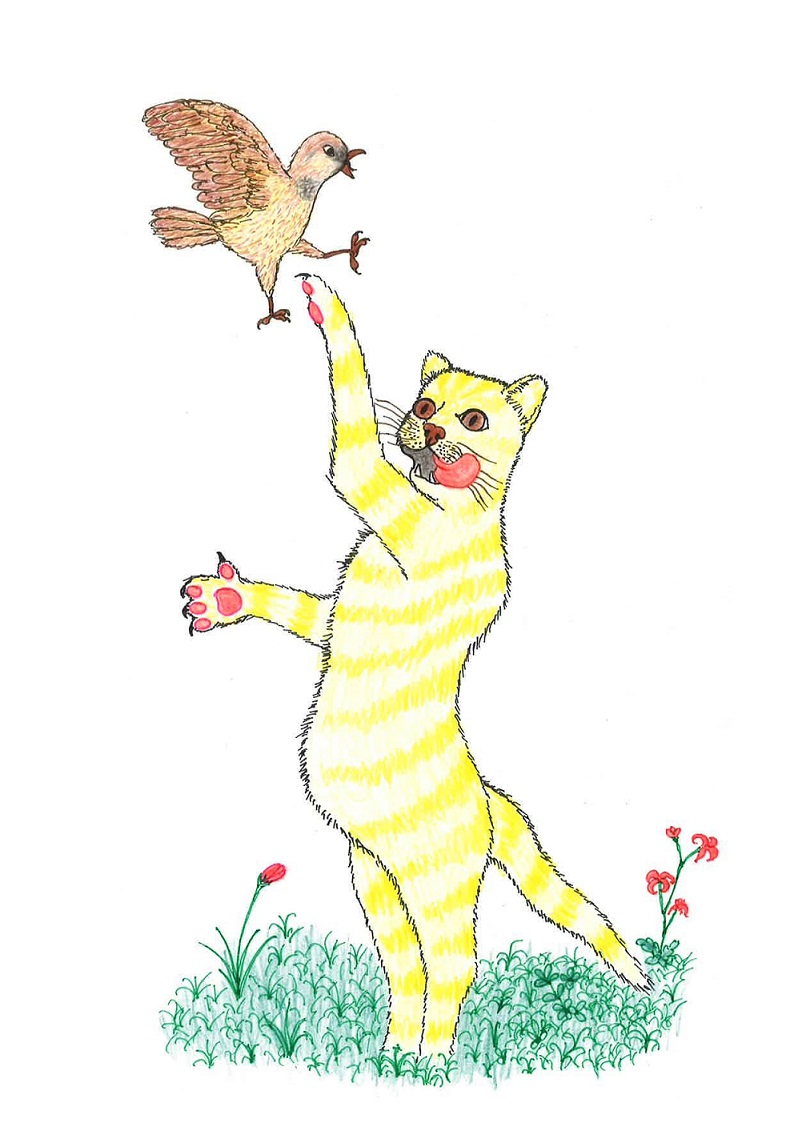
Houdong Lamboiba, the monk cat, and Pebet bird

=== The flattery ===
In the Meitei folktale of "Houdong Lamboiba And Pebet" (transl. The Mystic Cat and Pebet), a clever cat, who fancied himself a monk cat (Meitei: Houdong Lamboiba), stumbled upon a mother pebet with her newly hatched chicks. He harbored a secret desire to devour the chicks but needed to gain the mother's trust first. He approached the mother pebet and asked, "Am I not the most handsome cat you've ever seen?" The mother pebet, aware of his true intentions and his lack of real beauty, knew she had to tread carefully. She replied, "Oh, you are as beautiful as the red flowers of the bamboo plants." Satisfied with her flattering response, he left, feeling pleased. However, he couldn't resist returning frequently to hear more compliments. Each time, the mother pebet compared him to the most beautiful elements of nature, and each time, he left with the same contented smile, his secret intentions momentarily forgotten.

=== The revelation ===
Many times passed, and the Houdong Lamboiba (Meitei: ꯍꯧꯗꯣꯡ ꯂꯝꯕꯣꯏꯕ) watched as the pebet children grew up. One day, he approached mother pebet with his usual question, hoping for a nice answer. But this time, mother pebet looked at him with disdain. "You are ugly," she said, comparing his face to the bottom of a black pot. Her harsh words stung, and she scolded him for his persistence.

=== Consequences ===
The Houdong Lamboiba was taken aback by Mother Pebet's sudden change in behavior. His surprise quickly turned to anger, and he decided to eat Mother Pebet and her children. As he prepared to pounce, Mother Pebet instructed her children to fly away. They all took to the air, but the youngest was caught by him. Determined to save her child, Mother Pebet used her wits. She told him that the best way to eat a pebet bird was to wash it thoroughly and then let it sunbathe on a banana leaf. He, foolishly trusting her, followed her instructions. Once the young pebet was dry and stronger from the sun, Mother Pebet told her to fly. The rejuvenated pebet flew away swiftly, escaping his grasp. In a twist of fate, the young pebet pooped in his hands as she flew off. Without thinking, he ate the poop, convinced that if it tasted good, the bird itself would be even better. Meanwhile, Mother Pebet and her children escaped safely, leaving the Houdong Lamboiba to ponder his foolishness.

== Houdong Sekpi marup ani ==
In the Meitei folktale of "Houdong Sekpi marup ani" (transl. The cat and the bat), a cat and a bat were good friends, living together in a forest. They were always there for each other, offering help and honesty in times of need. One tragic day, a wild elephant trampled the bat's five babies. Heartbroken, the bat wept until the cat arrived. "Why are you crying?" asked the cat. The bat recounted the devastating loss and pleaded with the cat to avenge her babies. She promised a feast of fish curry and fried rat if the cat could kill the elephant. Moved by the bat's sorrow, the cat vowed to help. As he roamed the jungle, he encountered a beehive and sought the bees' assistance in fulfilling his promise. The bees agreed and soon found the elephant in a dense part of the forest, where they attacked and killed it. The cat, eager to share the news and enjoy the promised feast, returned to the bat. However, the bat, overwhelmed with shame for not preparing the feast, flew away to hide. She perched upside down on a tree, and it is said that bats hang this way to avoid facing cats.

== Haudonggi Lamchat ==
In the Meitei folktale of "Haudonggi Lamchat" (transl. Cat's Nature), a mischievous cat caused trouble for everyone. However, one particular house bore the brunt of his antics. Every day, like clockwork, he would sneak into this house to pilfer fish, milk, and other delicious treats. The homeowner decided it was time to teach the cat a lesson. One day, he hid in a corner, waiting for the cat to arrive. After a long day of chasing and harassing little birds, the cat was exhausted and thirsty. The thought of cold, sweet milk filled his mind. He made his way to the house, moving stealthily towards the milk vessel. The owner, ready and waiting, grabbed a nearby stick and struck the cat. As a punishment, he then placed a necklace made of lai-tharoi (a type of small and elongated snails) around the cat's neck. The cat limped out of the house, burdened by the heavy necklace. Suddenly, he spotted a holy man approaching with a walking stick. Having just been beaten with a stick, the cat was bewildered to see another person carrying one. The cat felt a wave of relief upon realizing that the holy man had no ill intentions. The holy man then said, "I have renounced all worldly pleasures." Hearing this, the cat felt a deep sense of shame. However, it is often said that a cat's good manners are like a stain on its fur—it can simply lick it away, and soon everything is forgotten. So, as soon as the holy man departed, the cat wandered off to another house, searching for fish and milk.

== See also ==
- Yenakha Paotabi
- Pebet
- Lai Khutsangbi
- Khambrangchak
- Keibu Keioiba
