= Khambrangchak =

Meitei mythological bird

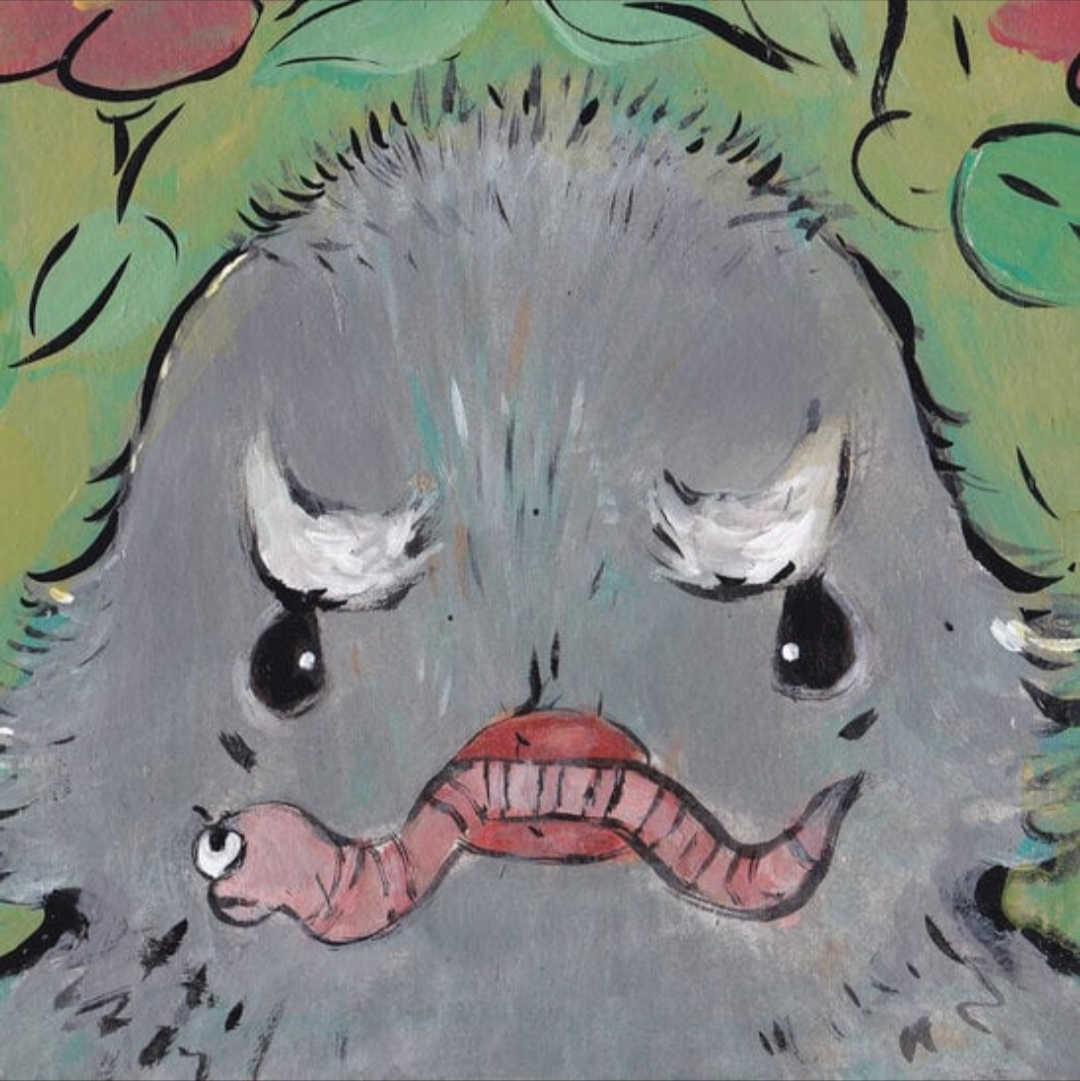
- Illustration of a baby khambrangchak

Creature information
- Grouping: birds
- Similar entities: Pebet, Kakyen, Uchek Langmeitong
- Folklore: Meitei mythology and folklore

Origin
- Country: India
- Region: Kangleipak (present day Manipur)

Khambrangchak (Meitei: ꯈꯝꯕ꯭ꯔꯥꯡꯆꯥꯛ) is a bird species frequently mentioned in Meitei mythology, folklore of Ancient Kangleipak (early Manipur).

The folktale of Lady Khambrangchak shows a series of mishaps she causes while preparing to visit her family of birth. She is later forgiven by the judging king, declaring it as a nature of women to be emotional during such preparation.

Khambrangchak is often known as "Khambrangchak Pidonnu" (Meitei: ꯈꯝꯕ꯭ꯔꯥꯡꯆꯥꯛ ꯄꯤꯗꯣꯟꯅꯨ) or "Khambrangchak Tonsenu" (Meitei: ꯈꯝꯕ꯭ꯔꯥꯡꯆꯥꯛ ꯇꯣꯟꯁꯦꯅꯨ).

== Identification ==
Some scholars identity Khambrangchak as yellow wagtail. Some scholars identify Khambrangchak as white pied wagtail.

Moirangthem Kirti Singh identified Khambrangchak as partridge.

A publication of the "World Wide Fund for Nature, India", identified Khambrangchak as multiple bird species. These species were (1) black naped blue fly catcher, (2) grey wagtail, (3) yellow headed wagtail, (4) white pied wagtail, etc.

== Stories ==
Once there was a Khambrangchak couple. One day Lady Khambrangchak told her husband that she wished to visit her parental house. Her husband allowed her to go. Happily, Lady Khambrangchak went to a nearby river to bathe. There was a crab in the river, which Lady Khambrangchak mistook as a stone and stood on. She started bathing, jumping and singing happily, disturbing the crab. The crab got angry and hurt her legs with its claws. Lady Khambrangchak shouted in pain and flew away, towards a fruit tree and sat on its branch, causing fruit to fall down on an anthill. A group of angry ants emerged. They saw an old woman sitting nearby and bit her. The old woman rolled on the ground in pain, destroying a fence. There was a bat's nest in the fence, which was also destroyed. The bat got frightened and flew away. As bats could not see properly in daytime, it accidentally flew inside a King's elephant's nostril. Unable to find a way out, it stayed inside the elephant's nose.

From that day onwards, the elephant did not eat anything. It felt sick. The King called a physician, who observed the elephant. He treated the elephant with medicine. The smell of the medicine disturbed the bat, who flew out of the nose. The King's guards caught the bat and brought it before the King.

The King asked the bat why it stayed inside his elephant's nose. The bat blamed the old woman for everything. The old woman was brought before the King. She blamed the ants for everything. The ants were brought before the King. They blamed the fruit. The fruit was brought before the King. The fruit blamed Lady Khambrangchak for everything.

Lady Khambrangchak was brought before the King. She confessed that she disturbed a crab. The King said that it was not only human women who were over-excited to beautify themselves to visit their parental houses, but also the female birds and female animals. The king set her free. Thus, the preparation of Lady Khambrangchak for visiting her parental house became widely known and blameworthy in the entire kingdom.

In another version of the story, the group of ants bit a pig. The pig jumped on a banana tree. The banana tree could not hold the pig's weight. The tree fell on a fence. The fence was broken. It fell on a pond] The pond fell angry and complained to the king. The king called all of the accused. All of them told him whatever they had experienced. Later, the king set all of them free.

== Interpretation ==
Regarding the preparation of Lady Khambrangchak for visiting her parental house (Meitei: Khambrangchak Mapam Chatpa), scholar Chirom Rajketan Singh said,

“Carelessness can lead to chaos and the careless woman in Khambrangchak Mapam Chatpa caused a series of anger. Though pardoned for her fault, the tale depicts the woman's unawareness of things around her as she was engrossed in beautifying herself. This implies woman's love and fascination for beauty which can make her see nothing around.”

— Chirom Rajketan Singh

== In art ==
Khambrangchak is shown in an artwork of goddess Phouoibi (Meitei: ꯐꯧꯑꯣꯏꯕꯤ), along with flower designs, found in Senjam Chirang (Meitei: ꯁꯦꯟꯖꯝ ꯆꯤꯔꯥꯡ). It is kept in the Manipur State Museum.

== See also ==
- Uchek Langmeitong
