= Shamu (Meitei culture) =

Elephants in Meitei civilization

Shamu (Samu) Elephants in Meitei culture
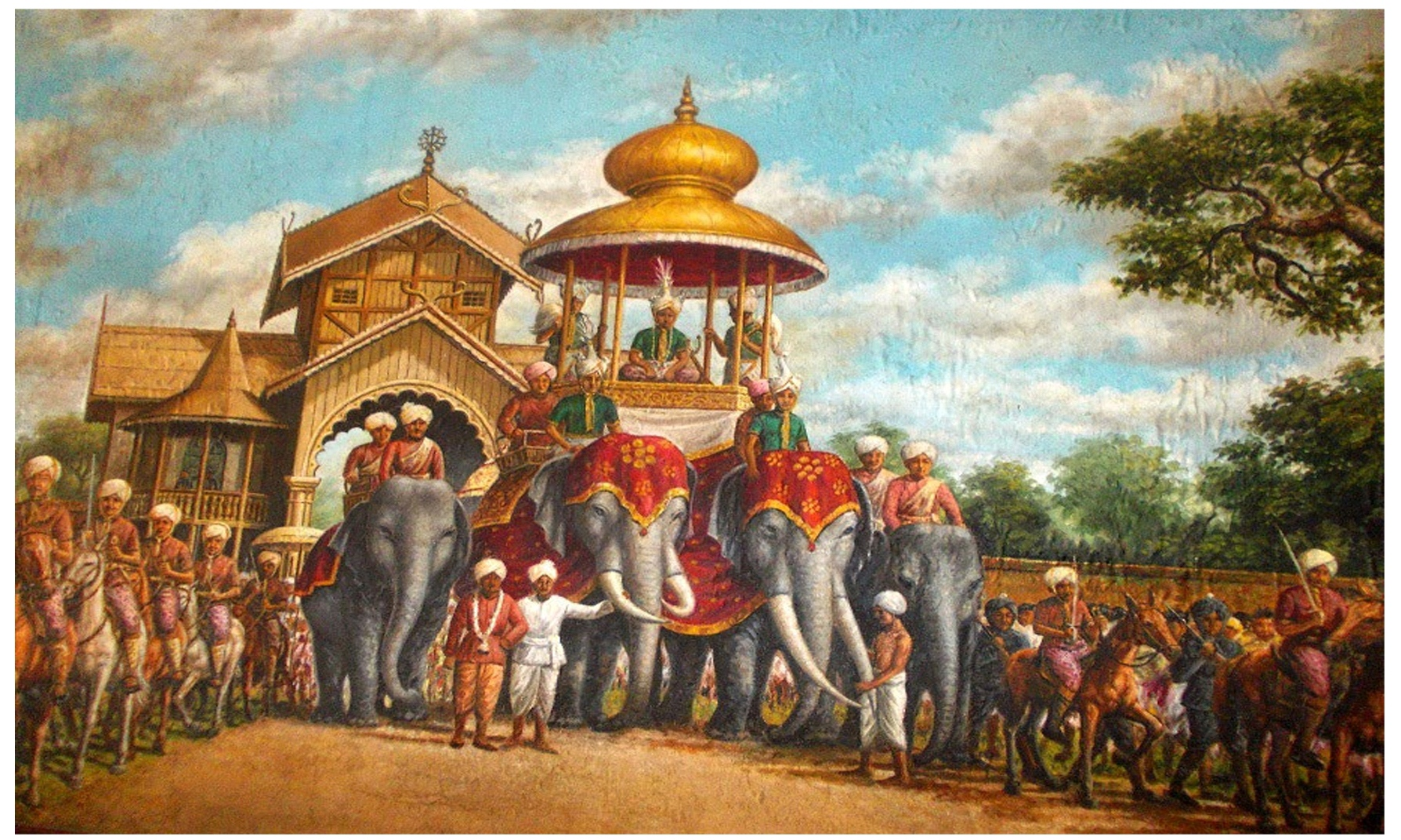
- A classical Meitei painting depicting Meitei king Chandrakirti, the ruler of Kangleipak (Manipur), riding on his imperial pet elephants
- Stylistic origins: Meitei culture
- Cultural origins: Meitei culture

In Meitei civilization, elephants, known as Shamu or Samu in Meitei language, play important roles, in different aspects of the cultural heritage of the Meitei people (also known as Manipuris) in Manipur, and other Meitei populated places in Assam, Bangladesh, Myanmar, Tripura, among others.

Elephants are often treated as royal animals, besides horses. In Meitei language and literature, elephants and horses are collectively known as yaisa or langgoi.

== History ==
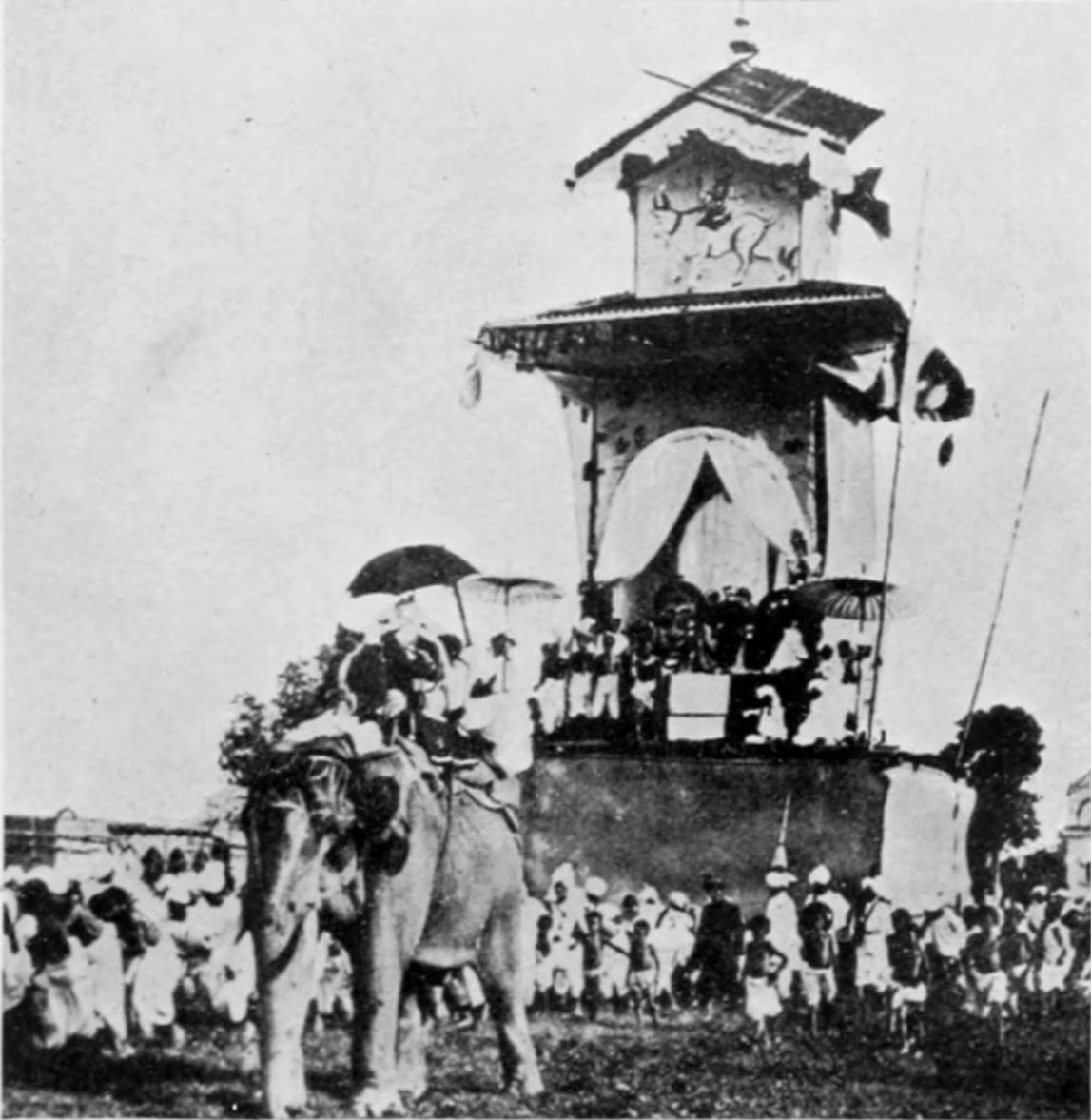
An elephant being used by the Meitei royalties during a festive occasion in Manipur

=== Early times ===
Elephants (Shamu) are featured in the design called "Shaphee Lanphee." This traditional fabric, often a shawl, has a black background with a red border. The fabric includes 10 different designs, including the elephants (Shamu). The Shaphee Lanphee is made by hand with needlework on fabric woven by Meitei women using a Loin Loom. "Shaphee" refers to animal fabric, and "Lanphee" refers to the fabric of war. The origin of this particular Meitei clothing dates back to the time of King Loiyumba (c. 10th century CE).

=== Medieval times ===
The elephant plays a significant role in the story of Meitei King Rajarshi Bhagyachandra, also known as Karta Maharaj, during his time in Assam. To test his legitimacy as the king of Manipur, the king of Tekhao (Assam) asked Bhagyachandra to capture a wild elephant that had been causing disturbances. This elephant, known for its aggression, had been kept at the Tekhao palace after escaping during the upheaval caused by the 1764 war with Awa (in Myanmar).

When Bhagyachandra approached the elephant, it unexpectedly behaved in a calm manner, kneeling before him, allowing him to mount it. This behavior was interpreted as a divine sign, symbolizing Bhagyachandra’s rightful position as the ruler of Manipur. The elephant’s recognition of Bhagyachandra, possibly due to a previous connection, played a pivotal role in the validation of his kingship.

The elephant involved in the incident may have been Rajballabh, a domesticated elephant from the time of King Garibniwaj. This elephant had lived for many years and was familiar to the people of Manipur. Its interaction with Bhagyachandra reinforced the cultural and symbolic significance of elephants in Meitei society, where they were regarded as symbols of power and were used in both warfare and ceremonial events.

== Meitei language terms ==
- māut (ꯃꯥꯎꯠ) – A person who takes care of or drives an elephant. This person is called a "mahout."
- yāisā (ꯌꯥꯏꯁꯥ) – The most important animal, often referring to a royal horse or elephant.
- lānggoi (ꯂꯥꯡꯒꯣꯏ) – A horse or elephant, though this word is not commonly used in everyday conversation.
- sāmu (ꯁꯥꯃꯨ) – An elephant. There are different terms related to elephants:
  - sāmu kāti (ꯁꯥꯃꯨ ꯀꯥꯇꯤ) – A small metal rod with a hook used to control an elephant.
  - sāmu tāibot (ꯁꯥꯃꯨ ꯇꯥꯏꯄꯣꯠ) – A howdah, which is a seat placed on an elephant's back.
  - sāmu mayā (ꯁꯥꯃꯨ ꯃꯌꯥ) – The tusk of an elephant.
  - sāmu yāisa (ꯁꯥꯃꯨ ꯌꯥꯏꯁꯥ) – A large and beautiful royal elephant.
  - sāmu lamsā (ꯁꯥꯃꯨ ꯂꯝꯁꯥ) – A wild elephant.
  - sāmusang (ꯁꯥꯃꯨꯁꯪ / ꯁꯥꯃꯨꯁꯡ) – A large shelter where elephants are kept and fed.

== Folktales ==
=== The Flying Elephant: Samu Apaibi ===
In the Meitei folktale of "Samu Apaibi" (transl. The Flying Elephant), a dead elephant was found in a jungle, having died from bee stings. Eagles were feeding on the elephant's intestines, creating holes in its stomach. Due to the intense sunlight, the torn parts of the stomach hardened, trapping the eagles inside.

A performer of dance and music passed through the jungle and encountered the dead elephant. To determine if the elephant was truly dead, he played a traditional musical instrument. The sound caused the eagles to fly out of the elephant's body in fear, briefly causing the elephant to rise into the air. After the man played the musical instrument again, the elephant flew once more, but it fell back to the ground.

The man decided to ride the elephant and, by playing the musical instrument, caused the elephant to fly again. He then decided to take the elephant to the king, hoping to sell it. Upon arriving at the palace, the man flew the elephant in front of the king, queen, and ministers, attracting attention. The king offered the man gold in exchange for the elephant and the musical instrument. The man agreed, receiving the gold in return.

The king, now in possession of the flying elephant, showed it to his court. He and the queen later took a ride on the elephant, which was decorated for the occasion. The king played the musical instrument, causing the elephant to rise into the sky. As the elephant flew higher, the eagles trapped inside began to fly out through the holes in its body. Eventually, the elephant began descending and crashed back to the ground, causing harm to the king and queen.

The story serves as a cautionary tale, illustrating how the king, in his greed and overconfidence, was deceived by the man, resulting in the loss of both his wealth and his life.

=== The Clever Frog Defeats the Tiger and Elephant ===
In the Meitei folktale of "Kei Amadi Shamu bu Hangoi na Maithiba Piba" (transl. The clever frog defeats Tiger and Elephant), in a forest, an elephant and a tiger, both strong and fearless, lived without encountering each other until one day, they both arrived at the same location in search of food. They did not respect each other. The tiger's roar was powerful enough to shake the mountains, while the elephant's trumpet caused the forest to tremble, scaring the other animals away.

The tiger overpowered the elephant and took him captive. Although the tiger considered killing the elephant, he was already full from eating, so he kept the elephant alive for the time being. While captive, the elephant noticed a frog on a nearby tree and called out to it. The loud voice of the elephant angered the frog, which made the elephant even more frustrated.

The frog then proposed a race, stating that the winner would be considered the greater one. The race began, and during the race, the frog jumped onto the elephant’s back and then leapt off before reaching the finish line, thus winning the race. The two then became friends.

When the tiger realized the elephant had escaped, he searched for him and encountered the frog. They argued, and another race was arranged. Using the same technique as before, the frog won the race again. The tiger, defeated, fled.

As a result, the frog successfully saved the elephant from the tiger. The two lived peacefully thereafter. This story demonstrates that intelligence can sometimes be more effective than physical strength.

=== The egotistical elephant and praying pebet ===
In the Meitei folktale of "The egotistical elephant and praying pebet", in a forest at the edge of a large forest, a pebet bird and her young lived in a nest containing eggs awaiting hatching. One day, a herd of elephants approached the area where the nest was located. As the elephants came closer, the baby pebets became anxious and asked their mother to request the elephants to be cautious to avoid destroying the nest and the eggs.

The mother pebet approached the leader of the herd and respectfully requested that the elephants be careful as they passed. All elephants, except for one, heeded her request. The last elephant, young and arrogant, ignored the plea and, believing his strength made him invincible, crushed the nest and its contents underfoot.

The mother pebet, deeply saddened by the loss of her young, confronted the young elephant, expressing her anger at the destruction. However, the young elephant disregarded her words and continued with the herd. In her grief, the pebet prayed to the divine mother, Leimarel, seeking guidance.

After several days of prayer, the divine form of Mother Leimarel appeared, offering advice and blessings. Following this guidance, the pebet attacked the young elephant by repeatedly striking a sensitive area on his back, causing a wound. She then allowed flies to lay eggs in the wound, which later hatched into maggots, worsening the elephant’s condition.

As the elephant grew weaker, he eventually begged for mercy, acknowledging the pain he had caused and expressing regret. The pebet, remembering the advice of forgiveness given by Mother Leimarel, agreed to spare the elephant’s life on the condition that he would respect all living creatures. The elephant, now repentant, promised to change his ways.

The pebet then used medicinal herbs to treat the elephant’s wound. Over time, the elephant recovered, and his reputation in the jungle changed from one of arrogance to one of gentleness. The pebet and the elephant formed a lasting friendship.

=== King's Elephant in "Lamhui amashung Keishal" ===
In the Meitei folktale of "Lamhui amashung Keishal" (transl. The Fox and the Jackal), a king once had a large elephant that he used for riding. One day, the elephant wandered into the jungle and died there. The king sent his soldiers to search for the elephant but could not find it. He offered a reward to anyone who could return the elephant.

Meanwhile, a couple of foxes found the elephant’s body in the jungle. They decided to live inside the elephant’s stomach to avoid searching for food. After a few days, they grew tired and wanted fresh air, but when they tried to leave, the hole they had made to enter had closed up. They were trapped.

The king’s soldiers later came across the elephant’s body, thinking it was asleep. The female fox came up with a plan and pretended to be the elephant. She called out, asking the soldiers to bring oil and ghee to rub on the elephant’s legs, as they were numb from sleeping.

The soldiers returned with oil and ghee and began to rub the elephant. The female fox saw that the hole had softened and ordered the soldiers to step back so she could get up. She quickly crawled out, and her husband followed but was caught by the soldiers.

The soldiers brought the male fox to the king, who ordered his execution. The fox was tied up in the royal stable.

That night, a jackal visited the stable and saw the fox. The fox told the jackal that the king had planned to marry him off to his daughter, but he had refused and was going to be executed. The jackal wished he had such luck, and the fox offered to swap places. The jackal agreed, and the fox tied him up in his place before escaping.

The next morning, the king’s men arrived and, thinking it was the fox, beheaded the jackal. The fox returned to the jungle and shared the story with his wife. They both laughed at the trick and lived happily in the jungle.

=== Heavenly elephant in "Apangbagi Laibak" ===
In the Meitei folktale of "Apangbagi Laibak" (transl. The Foolish Man's Fortune), a foolish man and his wife lived in a village. One day, while the man was guarding his field, an elephant flew down from the sky and began eating his crops. The man became angry and decided to punish the elephant. He grabbed the elephant’s leg, and the elephant flew up into the sky, carrying him with it.

They reached the Sky Kingdom, where the Sky King was surprised to see a human. The man explained that the elephant had eaten his crops and asked for compensation. The King gave him gold and silver and ordered the elephant to take him back home.

The man became rich, and his wife wore gold and silver. In the same village, there was a clever man whose wife sold vegetables. She noticed the foolish man’s wealth and asked him how he became rich. The fool explained everything, and the clever man asked to be taken to the Sky Kingdom.

The two men waited for the elephant to return. When it did, the fool grabbed its leg, and the clever man held onto the fool. The elephant flew up into the sky, and as they were flying, the clever man asked how much gold and silver the King had. While trying to show the amount with his hands, the fool let go of the elephant’s leg. Both men fell from the sky, and the clever man died. The fool survived and lived happily with his newfound wealth.

=== Pebet's Avenge to the Wild Elephant ===
In the story of "Pebet's Avenge to the Wild Elephant", a Pebet bird had a nest in the bushes with her chicks and newly hatched eggs. One day, a herd of elephants approached the nest. The chicks warned their mother that the elephants were getting close and might crush them. The Pebet mother asked the leader of the herd to take another route to avoid the nest. The leader agreed, but the last elephant in the herd, who was large and rude, ignored the request and crushed the chicks and eggs with its foot.

The Pebet bird, upset by the loss of her chicks, vowed to take revenge. She began to poke the elephant's back, causing pain and allowing flies to lay maggots on its skin. The elephant became infected and died after a few days.

The story teaches that all creatures, regardless of their size, should be treated with respect. Even the small Pebet bird was able to defeat the large elephant.

=== Elephant in "Houdong Sekpi marup ani" ===
In the Meitei folktale of "Houdong Sekpi marup ani" (transl. The cat and the bat), an elephant was targeted by a cat and a bat, who lived together as good friends in a jungle. They helped each other and were honest with one another. One day, a wild elephant killed all five of the bat's babies. The bat became very upset and asked the cat for help in getting revenge on the elephant. The bat requested the cat if he could kill the elephant.

The cat felt sorry for the bat and agreed to help. While walking through the jungle, the cat asked a beehive for help. The bees agreed to assist and found the elephant. Together, they killed the elephant.

== Mythology and religion ==
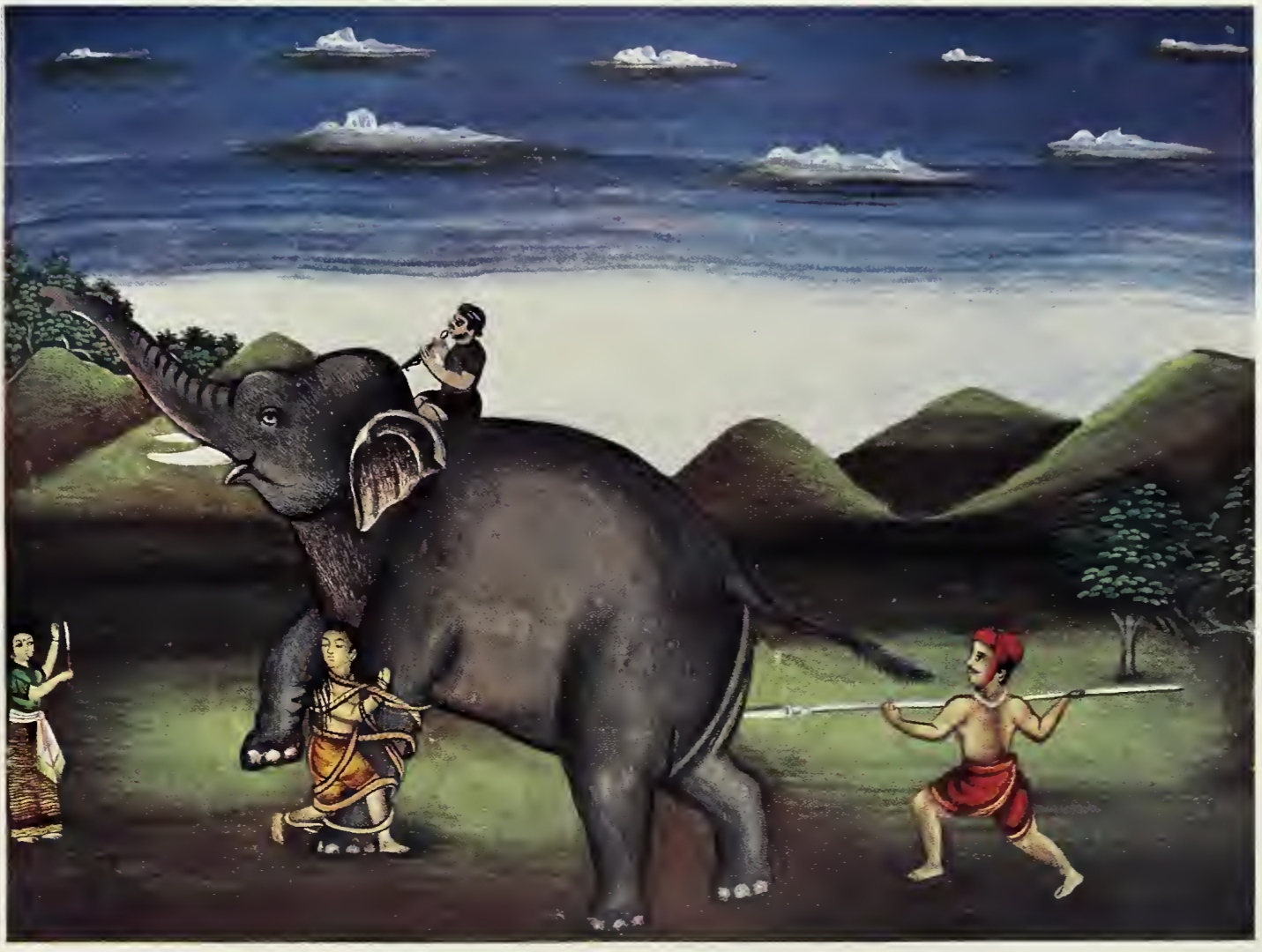
A traditional Meitei painting depicting an attempt to assassinate Khuman Khamba by his enemies using an elephant, in the classical Meitei epic of Khamba Thoibi

=== Elephant's torture incident in "Khamba Thoibi" ===
Shamu Khongyetpa (Torture of Khamba by Elephant) is a significant episode in the Khamba Thoibi epic, a central narrative of Meitei folklore from the ancient Moirang civilization in Manipur. In this episode, Khamba, the protagonist, is subjected to punishment by an elephant, reflecting themes of suffering and endurance. The story is an integral part of the epic, which focuses on the love and trials of Khamba and Thoibi. The Shamu Khongyetpa episode contributes to the larger narrative of the epic, which includes elements of heroism, betrayal, and redemption.

In the classical Meitei epic of Khamba Thoibi, Prince Chingkhu Akhuba and Nongban Kongyamba planned to harm Khuman Khamba. They sent messengers to call Khamba to meet the Prince. On his way, Khamba was stopped by Kongyamba and his men. Kongyamba asked Khamba to give up his feelings for princess Thoibi, but Khamba refused. They fought, and Khamba defeated Kongyamba’s men. He nearly hurt Kongyamba, but Kongyamba’s men pulled him away, beat him, and tied him to an elephant.

The Prince arrived and ordered that Khamba be tied to the elephant. They used ropes to attach Khamba to the elephant's leg, but the elephant did not harm Khamba, thanks to the protection of God Thangjing. Kongyamba struck the elephant with a spear, but the elephant did not react.

That night, Goddess Panthoibi appeared to Thoibi in a dream and told her that Khamba was tied to the elephant. Thoibi quickly went to help him, cut the ropes, and helped him recover.

The incident was reported to the imperial court, and Nongtholba and Feiroijamba protested. The Prince ignored the complaints, leading to a disagreement with Nongtholba. Eventually, they went to the King. Before they arrived, princess Thoibi had already told the King about the situation. King Chingkhu Telheiba ordered that the criminals be punished, and Prince Akhuba and Kongyamba were imprisoned.

== Proverbs ==
- Samu mathunda pena khongba
  - Literal Meaning: Playing pena on the elephant’s back.
  - Real Meaning: This refers to not paying attention while listening.
- Samu mapot iroida thonba
  - Literal Meaning: Loading the buffalo with the elephant’s stuff.
  - Real Meaning: This means asking someone to do something beyond their ability.
- Samugi kokthengfam Chothe-gi napteifam
  - Literal Meaning : Elephant’s head-touch, Chothe’s handkerchief.
  - Real Meaning: This refers to a situation where everyone tries to blame towards a particular person.
- Samuna nai khangde, ningthouna naithide
  - Literal Meaning: An elephant knows no pain; a king knows no defeat.
  - Real Meaning: This refers to forgetting or ignoring the struggles or feelings of close ones.
- Samuna taalaga yarakta hotchillu
  - Literal Meaning: Rush inside the teeth if the elephant chases you.
  - Real Meaning: This refers to give up when you're in an impossible situation.
- Samu maya thindorakpa mang-ge theng-guna yeisinba yade
  - Literal Meaning:
  - Real Meaning: This means you cannot stop something that is already moving forward or inevitable.
- Samuna mayang kanglaga iroimuk chaowee
  - Literal Meaning: The elephant is just a buffalo when it is lean.
  - Real Meaning: This refers to the idea that when someone in a high position is reduced or weakened, they are no different from ordinary people.

== Theatre ==
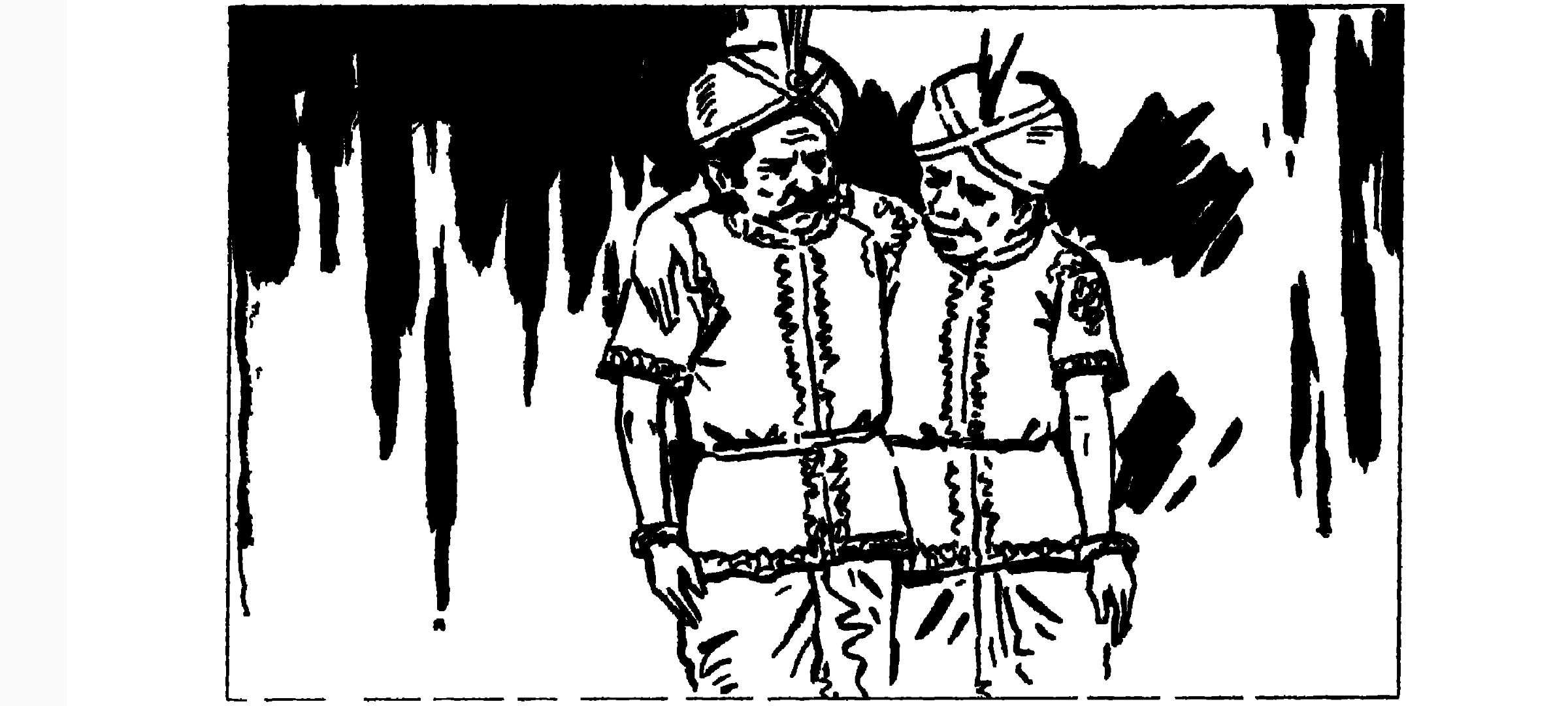
Meitei King Bhagyachandra (also known as Ching Thang Khomba) of Kangleipak (Manipur) and his Assamese counterpart after the former captured the elephant

"Bhagyachandrana Tekhao Shamu Phaaba" is a classical Meitei theatrical performance staged in Borobekra village, Jiribam, Kangleipak (Manipur). The play dramatizes the historical event of the capture of an elephant in the Tekhao region by Meitei King Bhagyachandra, also known as Ching Thang Khomba, of Kangleipak. This event is significant in the region's history, symbolizing the king's authority and power. The performance incorporates traditional Meitei dance, music, and dramatic techniques to depict the capture of the elephant, reflecting the cultural and historical importance of the event.

== Shamu Taipot ==
The Shamu Taipot is a decorative howdah that was used by Meitei King Churachand Singh of Manipur (1891–1941 CE). It is traditionally placed on the back of an elephant, secured by ropes around the elephant's belly. It can also be placed across the backs of two elephants in a configuration known as "Khabak Lakpa." This arrangement is used during royal processions and festive occasions. It is crafted from Chingshu teak wood and is designed to resemble a small, dome-shaped temple, a style common in Meitei temples in Bangladesh and in the monuments of the Meitei Kings at RadhaKunda (U.P).

The Shamu Taipot features a double-seated structure with an extended canopy at the front. The four sides of the howdah are decorated with high-relief carvings of animals and floral motifs. The front panel includes two stages with a figure looking backward, with the inscription "MANIPUR STATE" at the top. The lower section of this panel depicts the Nura Khudonglei flowering plant.

The six supporting pillars of the howdah are also carved with high-relief motifs, including stag horn ferns at the curved lower ends. The side panels display figures of flying horses in a prancing pose.

== Shamu Makhong ==
The Statue of Shamu Makhong is a notable monument where a statue of Meitei King Bheigyachandra is mounted on a large elephant. This statue was erected by Heisnam Betombi Singh. The monument commemorates the significance of elephants in Meitei culture and the role of King Bheigyachandra in the history of Manipur.

== Shamu Hanjaba ==
Shamu Hanjaba was the Superintendent of State Elephants in the Meitei kingdom during its monarchical period. The role involved the management and care of the royal elephants, which were significant for both military and ceremonial purposes. The Shamu Hanjaba was responsible for ensuring the elephants' readiness for various state functions, including warfare and royal processions. This position was integral to the administration of the Meitei kingdom, reflecting the importance of elephants in the kingdom's culture and governance.

== In paintings ==
The elephant is a prominent subject in Bhadra's artwork, particularly in his painting Shamu Khongyetpa (Torture of Khamba by Elephant). Bhadra employed techniques of light and shade to create a sense of volume, moving beyond traditional line-oriented illustrations. In this work, the elephant is depicted with a focus on realistic form and detail, showcasing Bhadra’s skill in blending colors and using fine lines. His approach to depicting the elephant contributed to the development of Meitei visual art during the period of cultural renaissance in literature and performing arts.

== Gallery ==
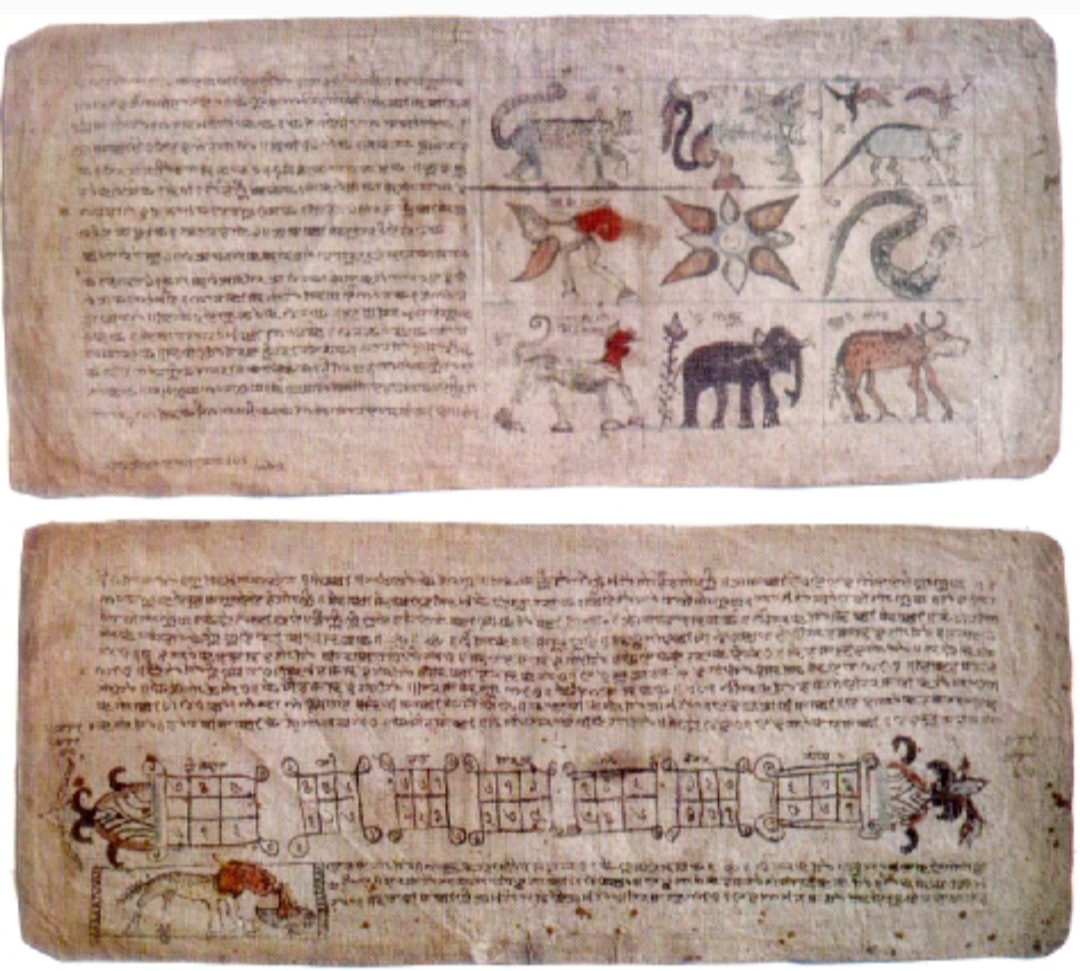

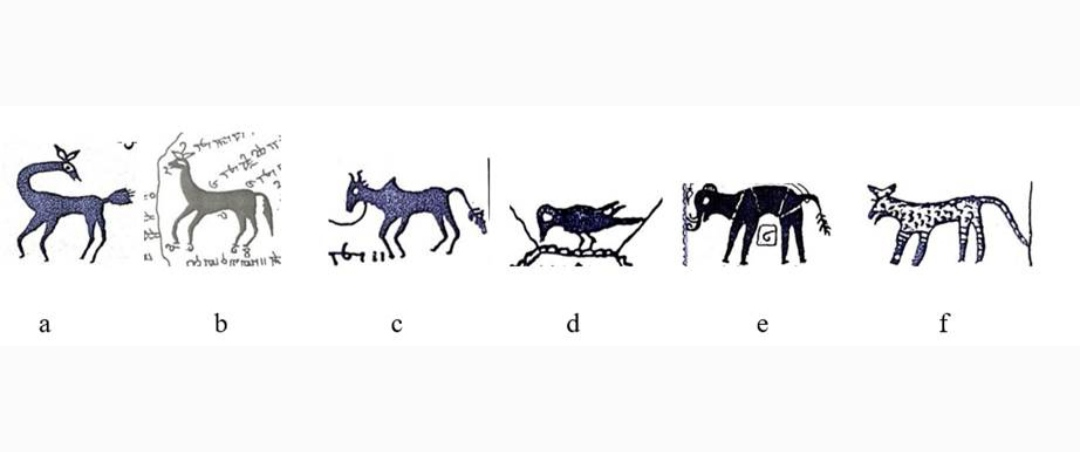

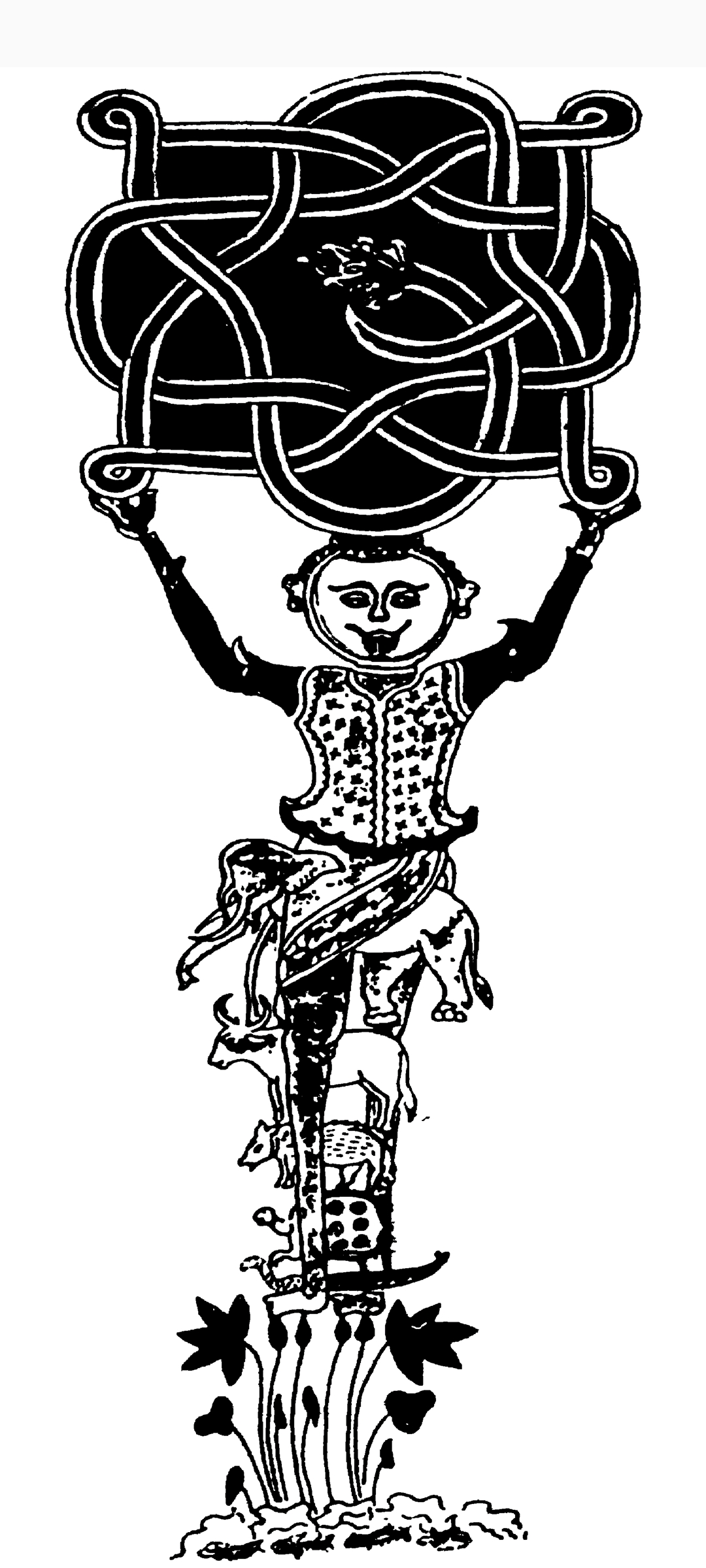

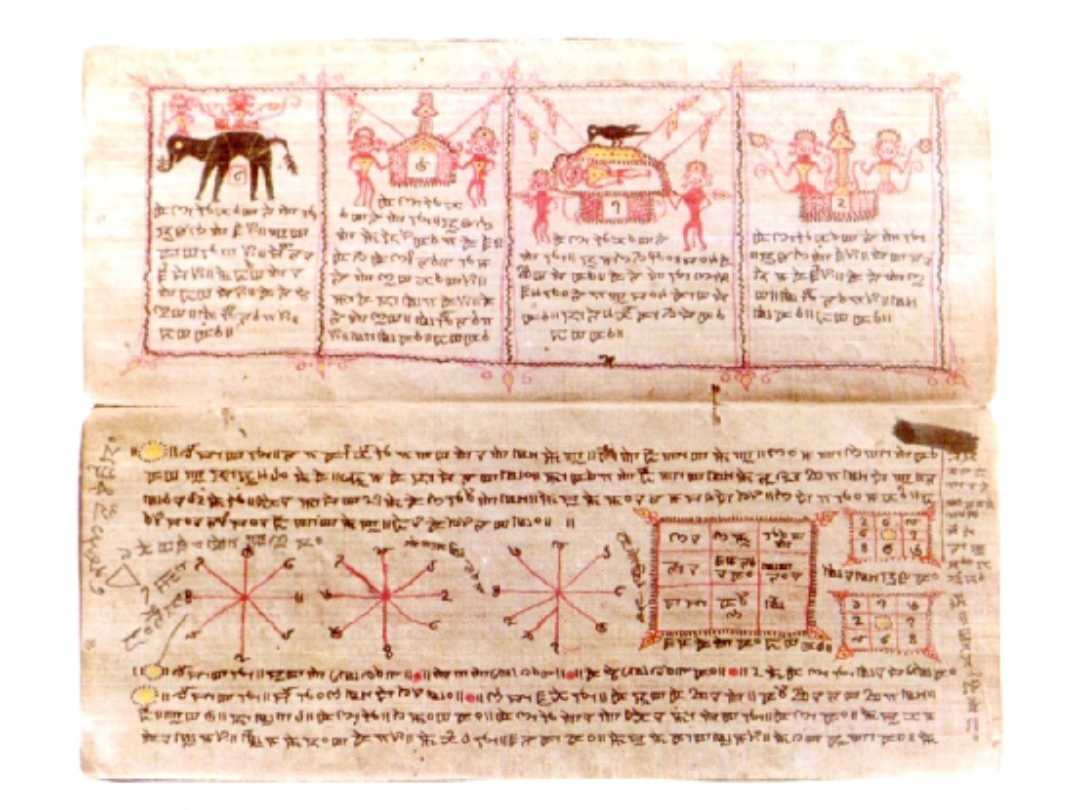

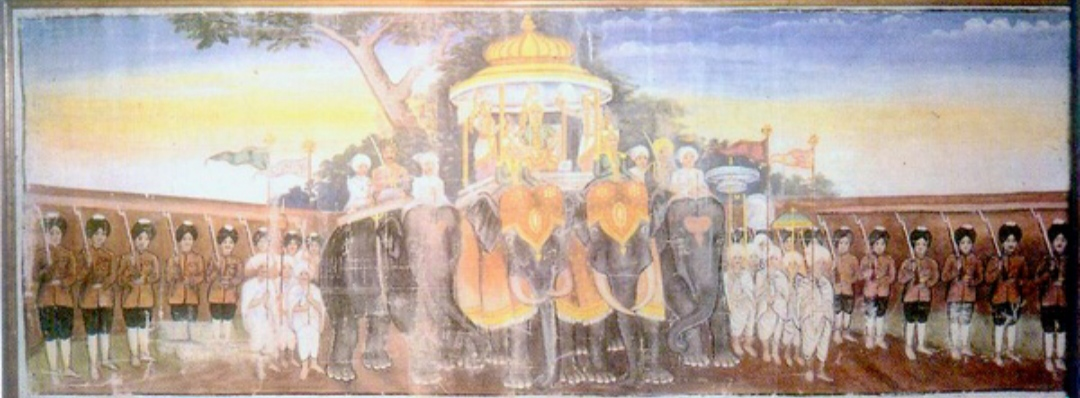

== See also ==
- Captive elephants
- Cultural depictions of elephants
- Elephants in ancient China
- Elephants in Kerala culture
- Elephants in the room
- War elephants
- Lai Haraoba
- Meitei traditional games
- Meitei traditional weapons
- Meitei traditional toys
- Meitei traditional fishing
- Meitei martial arts
