= Meetei San =

Cattle breed

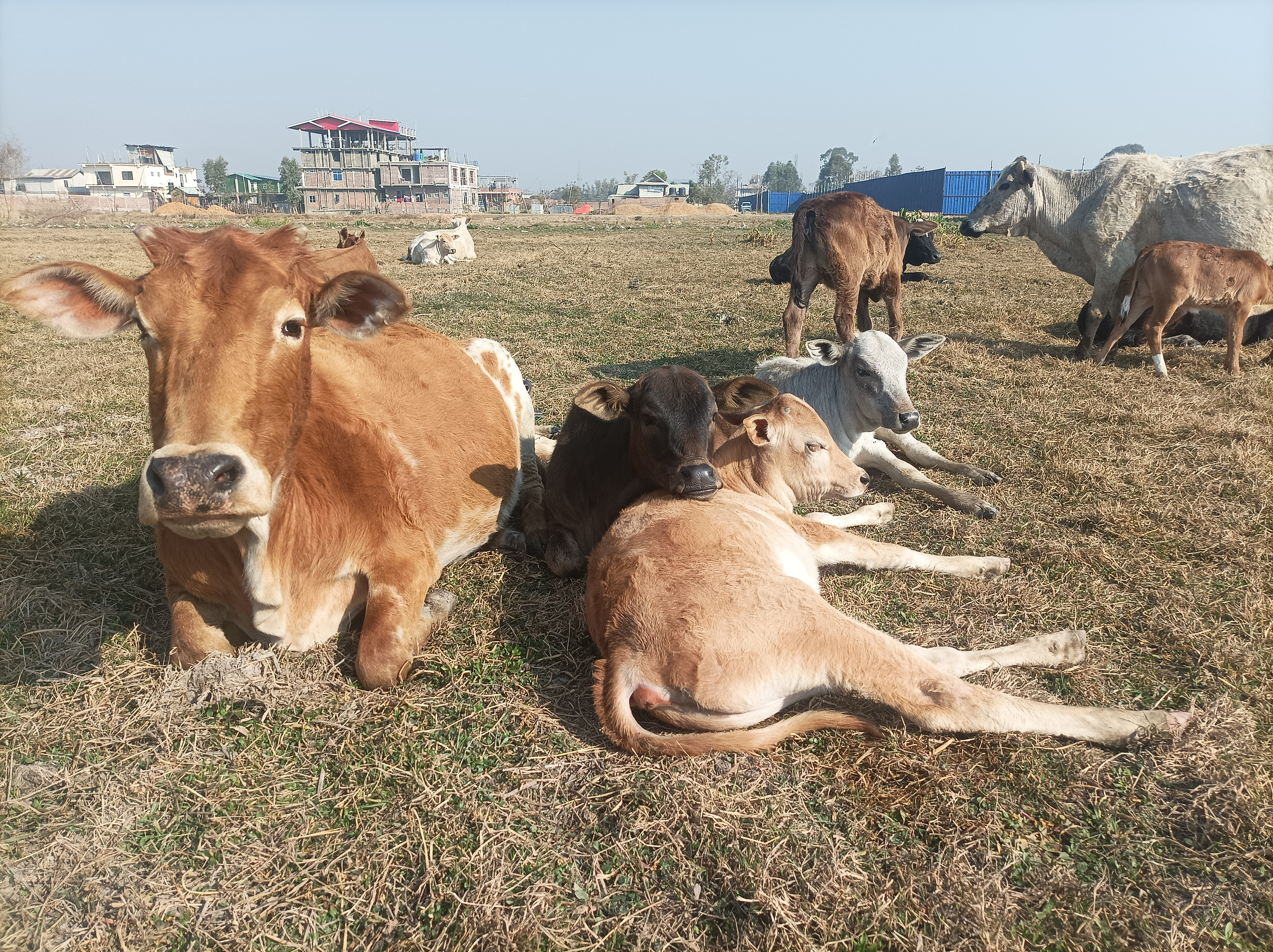
Meitei cattle grazing in a field

Meetei San (ꯃꯤꯇꯩ ꯁꯟ), also called Manipuri San (ꯃꯅꯤꯄꯨꯔꯤ ꯁꯟ), Meitei San (ꯃꯩꯇꯩ ꯁꯟ), or Sal (ꯃꯩꯇꯩ ꯁꯜ), is an indigenous cattle breed found in Manipur, India. These cattle are medium-sized, strong, and hardy. They can survive under difficult conditions. Meetei San is a dual-purpose animal, meaning it is used for both draught work and milk production. It is also used for meat to some extent.

Even though these cattle are important for families and the local economy, they are not used fully. Their milk production is low, and their population is decreasing. Because of this, the breed is facing the risk of extinction. There are also not enough efforts to protect and conserve this cattle breed.

== Etymology ==
The word Meetei refers to the indigenous people of Manipur, and San means cow. Because of this, the cattle are commonly known as Meetei San throughout the state. Manipuri communities in Manipur rear these cattle.

== Distribution and domestication ==
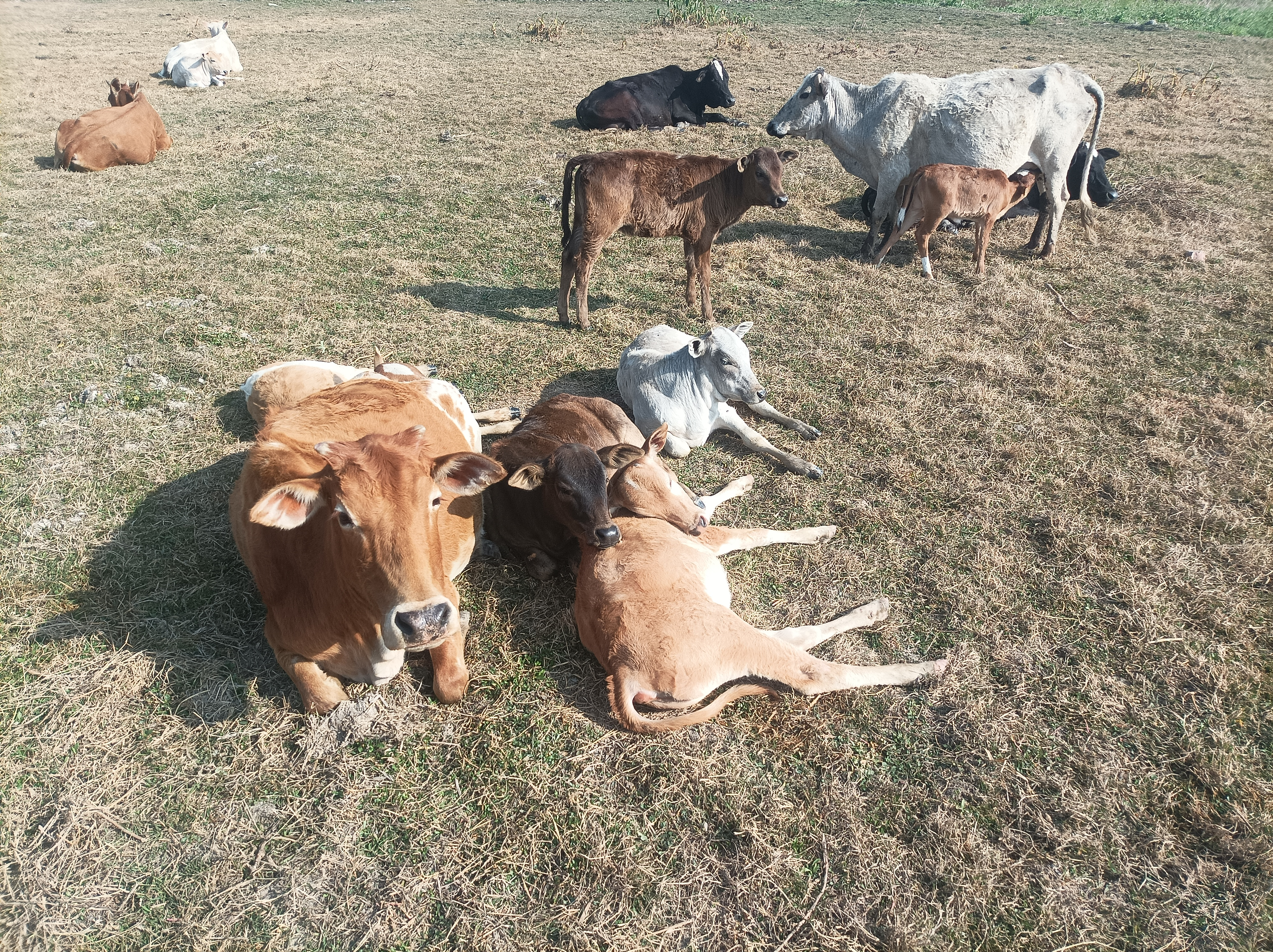
Meitei cattle in a field

Meetei San cattle are found only in Manipur. They live mainly in districts that have plains and grazing land. These cattle are reared in open grazing areas and also in closed cowsheds. A semi-intensive system is followed, where animals both graze and are stall-fed.

The breed has a semi-wild nature and is considered a rare type of cattle.

According to the 20th Livestock Census (2019), Manipur had about 2.63 lakh cattle. Out of these, 2.19 lakh were indigenous cattle and 0.44 lakh were crossbred cattle.

== General characteristics ==
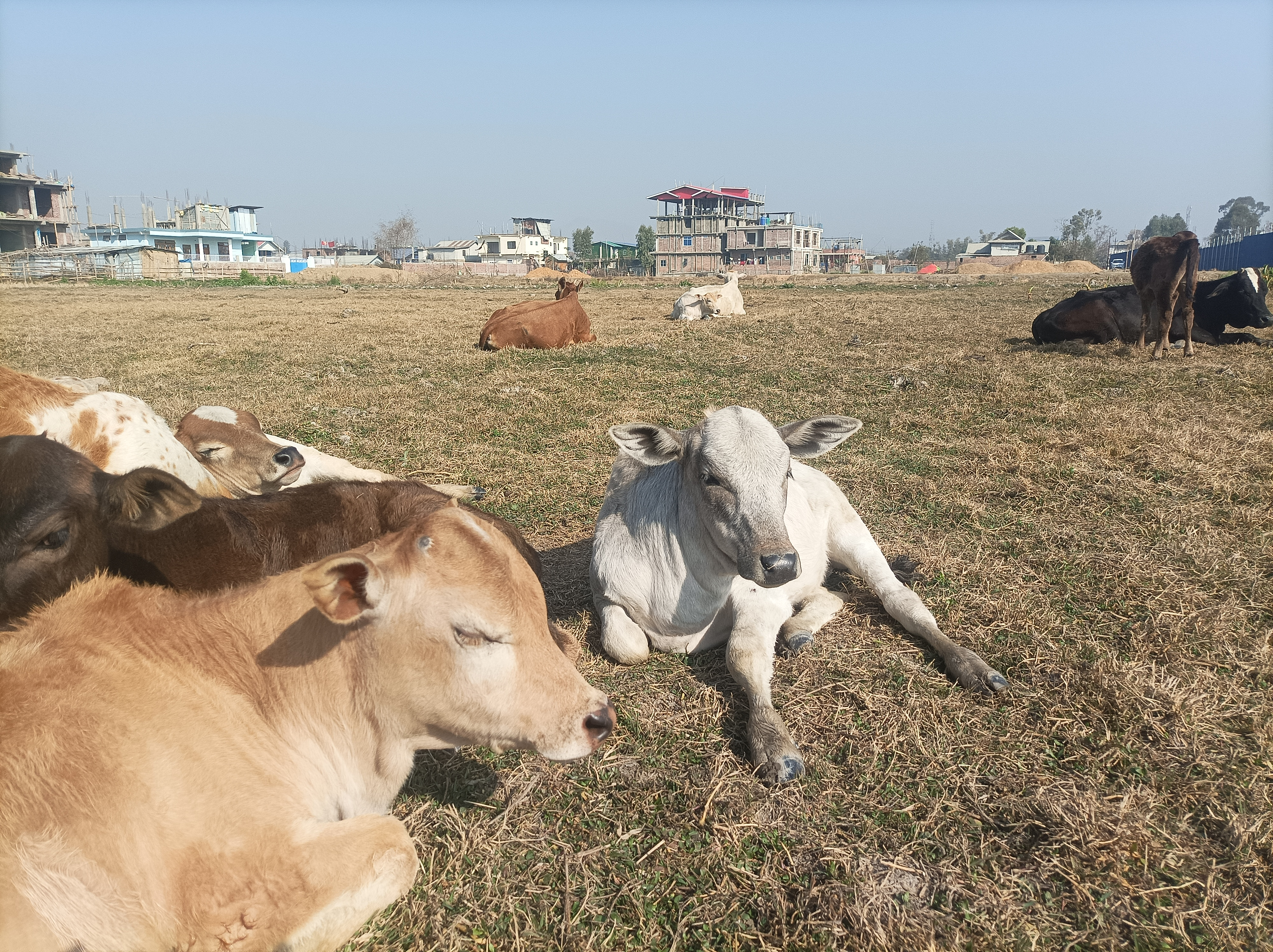
Meitei cows & bulls in a grazing area

Meetei San cattle are strong and well adapted to local conditions. They can survive with limited feed and simple management. These cattle are mainly used for draught work. Milk production is limited, but it still contributes to household needs.

The average daily milk yield ranges from 2.0 to 4.5 kg. This shows that there is scope to improve milk production in Manipur through proper breeding programs.

Cows begin calving at about 34 months of age, give birth annually, and produce approximately 7–8 calves during their lifetime. The breed is easy to rear, produces about 1.5 to 3 liters of milk per day (averaging around 2 liters), and its milk has been a staple food for the local population, though overall milk production has declined with the falling cattle numbers. The breed also shows some tolerance to common diseases such as foot and mouth disease, hemorrhagic septicemia, and black quarter.

== Reproductive characteristics ==
=== Age at sexual maturity ===
The average age at sexual maturity is 26.00 ± 0.36 months. This age is higher than in some other cattle breeds. This may be due to poor quality feed, lack of grazing land, and poor management conditions.

=== Oestrous cycle ===
The average length of the oestrous cycle is 21.50 ± 0.13 days. The average duration of oestrus is 18.43 ± 0.11 hours.

Oestrous behaviour

During the oestrus period, the following behaviors were seen:

- Restlessness was observed in 100% of the animals
- Frequent urination was seen in 70%
- Tail raising was seen in 20%
- Bellowing was observed in 90%
- Homosexual behavior was seen in 20%
- All animals showed genital discharge during oestrus.

Physical signs of oestrus

The following physical signs were observed:

- Vulval swelling
- Marked swelling: 60%
- Moderate swelling: 20%
- Mild swelling: 20%
- Hyperemia (reddening) of the vulval mucous membrane was seen in 80% of the animals

Genital discharge

The genital discharge was:

- Clear in 90% of animals
- Opaque in 10% of animals
- The amount of discharge was plenty in 60% of the cases. The amount and type of discharge can vary between breeds and also depend on the health of the reproductive organs.

=== Breeding performance ===
Age at first service

The average age at first fertile service was 27.00 ± 0.36 months. Differences in age at first service may occur due to breed, nutrition, housing, climate, and stress conditions.

Age at first calving

The average age at first calving was 37.35 ± 0.33 months. This age can vary depending on feeding, management, and environmental conditions.

=== Gestation period ===
The average gestation period was 280.10 ± 0.17 days. This value is within the normal range for cattle. Gestation length is not greatly affected by feeding or housing but can affect calf size.

== Milk production ==
=== Daily milk production ===
The average daily milk production was 2.86 ± 0.03 kg. This is lower than that of crossbred cattle, which usually produce more milk under good climatic and feeding conditions.

=== Total milk production ===
The total milk production per lactation was 363.34 ± 5.86 kg. Milk yield is an important economic trait because it affects the income of farmers and the success of dairy farming.

Providing good quality fodder and stress-free housing can help improve milk production in Meetei San cattle.

=== Lactation and dry period ===
Lactation length

The average lactation length was 407.23 ± 1.83 days.

Dry period

The average dry period was 148.00 ± 3.00 days. The dry period is important for the health of the cow and the growth of the unborn calf. Very short or very long dry periods can reduce productivity and reproductive efficiency.

== Calving and fertility traits ==
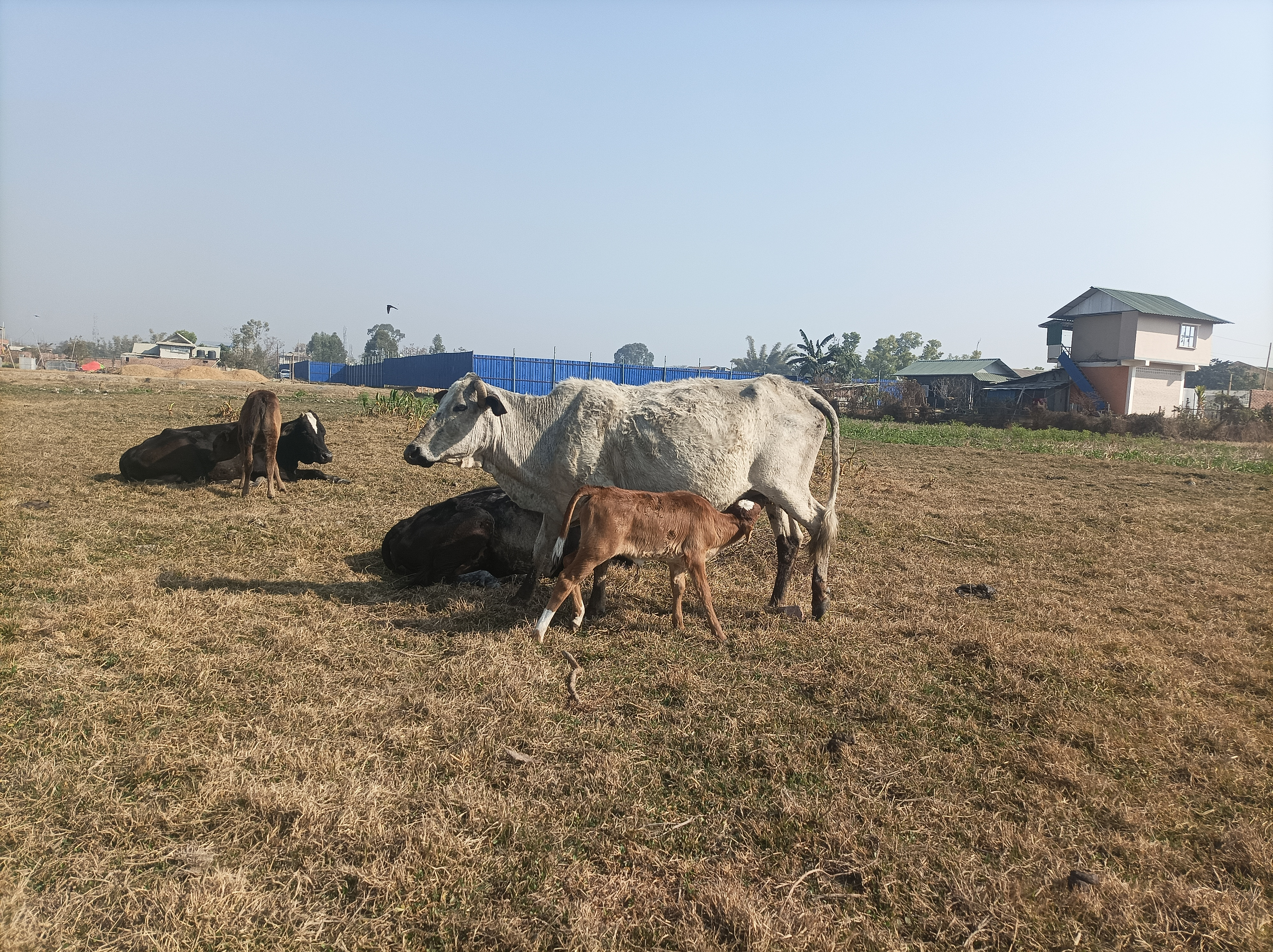
A calf drinking milk from a cow in a herd of Meitei cattle

=== Inter-calving period ===
The inter-calving period was 555.23 ± 3.97 days. This is the time between two calvings. A shorter inter-calving period is considered better for productivity.

=== Open days ===
The average number of open days was 275.13 ± 3.95 days. Open days are the number of days from calving until the cow becomes pregnant again. High open days may be caused by poor nutrition, reproductive problems, or management issues.

=== Services per conception ===
The number of services per conception was 2.28 ± 0.12. This means that, on average, more than two services were needed for one pregnancy. This shows moderate reproductive efficiency. Poor quality feed and stress from stall-feeding may affect fertility.

== Conservation status ==
The population of Meetei San cattle is decreasing rapidly. This decline is caused by poor feeding, lack of grazing land, environmental stress, and weak breeding and conservation programs. Proper management and conservation efforts are needed to protect this indigenous cattle breed for the future.

Traditionally used for agricultural work since ancient times, the breed experienced a sharp decline in use and population following the introduction of mechanized farming during the Green Revolution. In 2022, the Central Agricultural University (CAU), Imphal, initiated efforts to secure official recognition of the indigenous cattle variety Meetei San, as a distinct breed for its promotion and conservation. The absence of official recognition by the Government of India has resulted in the breed being classified as “nondescript” in livestock censuses conducted every five years by the Veterinary Department of Manipur. Census data show a population decline from 3.49 lakh in 2003 (17th census) to 2.06 lakh in 2019 (20th census). The bulls were previously in high demand for ploughing and agricultural work, including in Assam's Golaghat region. The Veterinary Science Department of CAU completed a three-year research study on Meetei San under the ICAR project on Characterisation of Livestock and Poultry Genetic Resources (NER) Manipur (2021–2022), covering physical characteristics, body measurements, reproductive traits, and management practices. A final report has been submitted to the National Bureau of Animal Genetic Resources, Karnal, seeking official registration and recognition of the breed. Due to the lack of recognition, Meetei San is currently excluded from several government development schemes, and recognition is expected to support its conservation and population growth. Mechanization has reduced the use of cattle in farming, leading to fewer farmers rearing them, and that increased slaughter for meat poses an additional threat to the breed.

== See also ==
- Kao (bull)
- Khambana Kao Phaba (painting)
