= Kabok =

Meitei ethnic food item

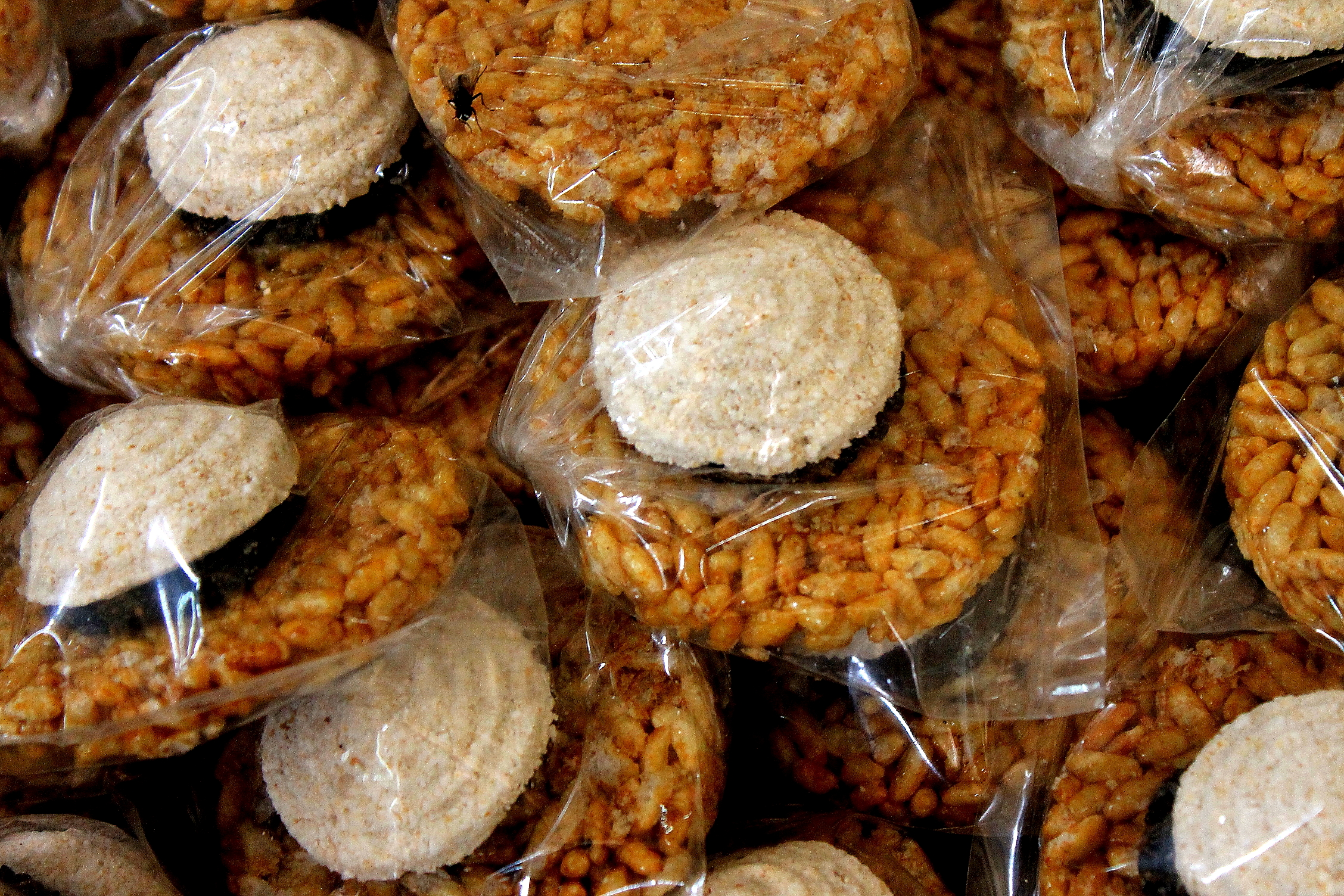

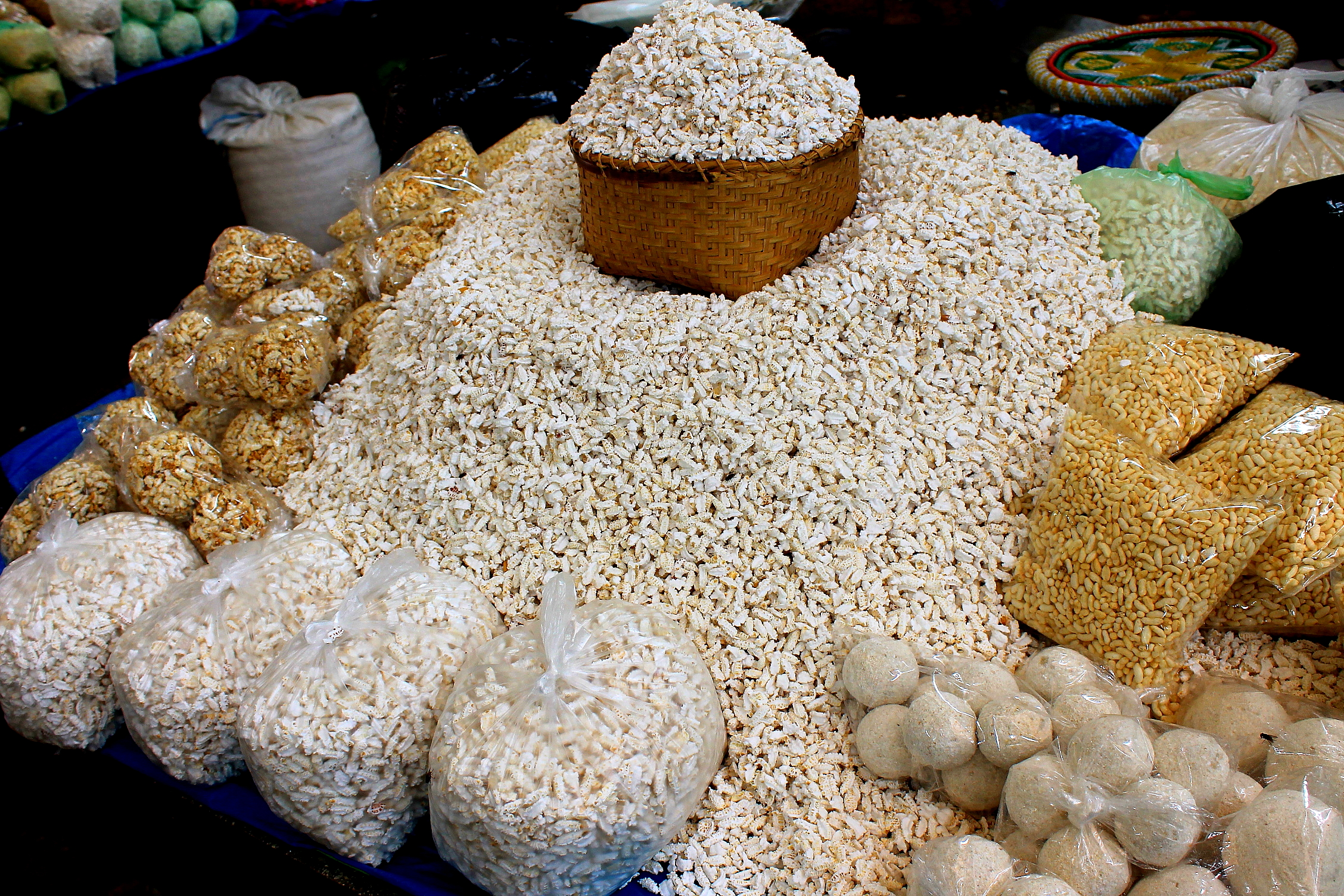

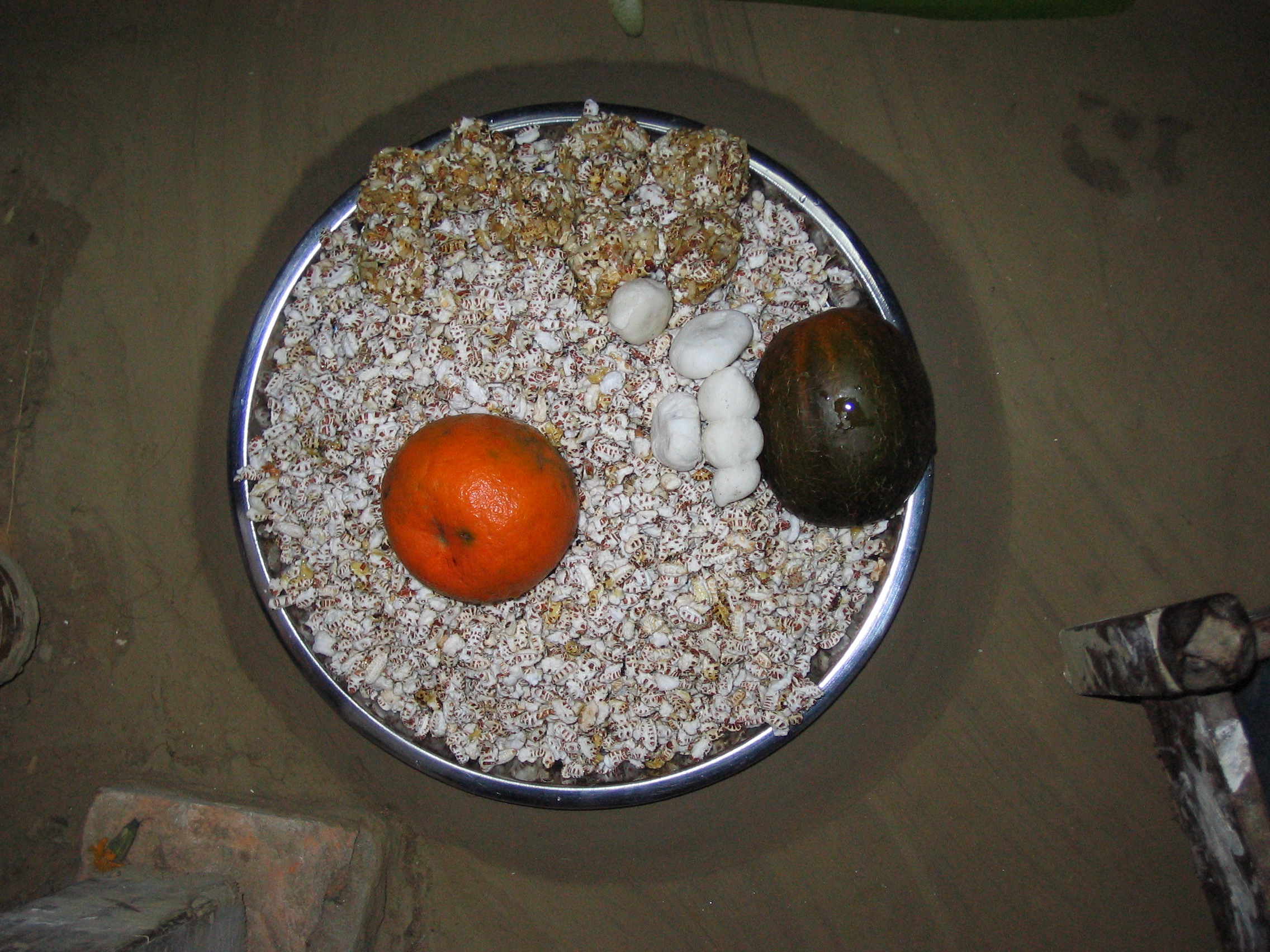

Kabok or Kapok is a Meitei ethnic food item, generally made up of puffed rice, roasted rice and molasses. It is available in many flavours, including honey flavor, sugarcane flavor and many others. It is a very popular snack in the Indian state of Manipur, especially among the Manipuri ethnicity. Tronglaobi village is the largest Kabok producing village in Manipur

== See also ==
- Rice pudding
- Gruel
