= Meitei folktales =

Folktales of Meitei ethnicity

Meitei folktales (Meitei Phunga Wari (Meitei))
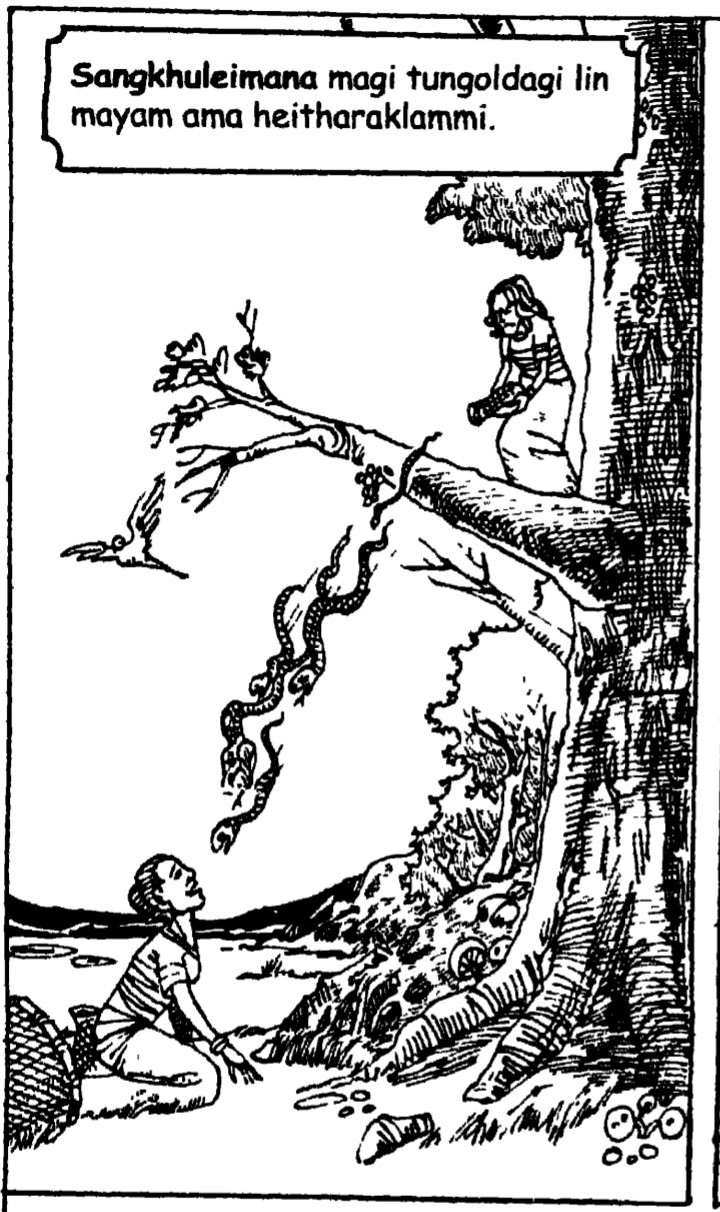
- A scene from the story of Sandrembi and Chaisra, a Meitei folktale
- Stylistic origins: Kangleipak (Meitei for 'Manipur')
- Cultural origins: Meitei culture

Related genres
- Meitei mythology

Related topics
- Meitei folklore

The Meitei folktales (Meitei: Meitei Phunga Wari), also sometimes referred to as the Manipuri folktales, are the large collections of folk stories developed from the Meitei culture since Ancient Kangleipak (early Manipur). Folktales are called "funga wari" ("phunga wari"), literally meaning "stories of kitchen furnace or stove" in Meitei language (officially called Manipuri language). In early times, in the Meitei households, children must have gathered around the kitchen fire, listening to the stories narrated by the elders. Generally, Meitei folktales were developed from the creativity of the old folks, especially the grandparents, who narrated the children the diverse sagas of varying genres.

== List of Tales ==
- The Rain of Kabok (Meitei: ꯀꯕꯣꯛꯀꯤ ꯅꯣꯡ, romanized: Kabok ki Nong)
- The Female Mosquito's Plight (Meitei: ꯀꯥꯡ ꯑꯃꯣꯝꯒꯤ ꯇꯦꯡꯊꯥ, romanized: Kang Amomgi Tentha)
- The Clever Frog Defeats the Tiger and the Elephant (Meitei: ꯀꯩ ꯑꯃꯗꯤ ꯁꯃꯨꯕꯨ ꯍꯉꯣꯢꯅ ꯃꯥꯢꯊꯤꯕ ꯄꯤꯕ, romanized: Kei amadi Shamu bu Hangoi na Maithiba Piba)
- Water that Turns Everyone into Tigers (Meitei: ꯀꯩ ꯑꯣꯟꯕ ꯀꯣꯝꯒꯤ ꯏꯁꯤꯡ, romanized: Kei Onba Kom Gi Eshing)
- Tiger Head (Meitei: ꯀꯩꯕꯨ ꯀꯩꯑꯣꯢꯕ, romanized: Keibu Keioiba)
- The Flying Elephant (Meitei: ꯁꯃꯨ ꯑꯄꯥꯢꯕ, romanized: Samu Apaibi)
- Sandrembi and Chaisra (Meitei: ꯁꯟꯗ꯭ꯔꯦꯝꯕꯤ ꯆꯩꯁ꯭ꯔꯥ, romanized: Sandrembi Chaisra)
- The Golden Deer and the Golden Parrot (Meitei: ꯁꯅꯥꯒꯤ ꯁꯖꯤ ꯑꯃꯗꯤ ꯁꯅꯥꯒꯤ ꯇꯦꯅꯋꯥ, romanized: Sanagi Saji amadi Sanagi Tenawa)
- The Golden Parrot (Meitei: ꯁꯅꯥꯒꯤ ꯇꯦꯅꯋꯥ, romanized: Sanagi Tenawa)
- The Doe and the Crow (Meitei: ꯁꯖꯤꯒ ꯀ꯭ꯋꯥꯛꯀ ꯃꯇꯥ ꯁꯥꯟꯅꯕ, romanized: Saji ga Kwak ka Mataa Saanaba)
- The Two Brothers (Meitei: ꯁꯥꯍꯤꯡ ꯆꯥꯕ ꯃꯆꯤꯜ ꯃꯅꯥꯎ, romanized: Sahing chaba machil manao)
- The Pigeon's Feast (Meitei: ꯂꯝꯈꯨꯅꯨꯅ ꯆꯥꯛꯀꯧꯕ, romanized: Lamkhunu Na Chakkouba)
- The Clever Fox (Meitei: ꯂꯝꯍꯨꯢ ꯂꯧꯁꯤꯡ, romanized: Lamhui Lousing)
- The Fox and the Jackal (Meitei: ꯂꯝꯍꯨꯢ ꯑꯃꯁꯨꯡ ꯀꯩꯁꯥꯜ, romanized: Lamhui amashung Keishal)
- The Fox's Trick (Meitei: ꯂꯝꯍꯨꯢ ꯒꯤ ꯇꯥꯠ, romanized: Lamhui gi Tat)
- Light Spirit (Meitei: ꯂꯥꯟꯃꯩ ꯊꯥꯟꯕ, romanized: Lanmei Thanbi)
- The Witch without a Chin (Meitei: ꯂꯥꯢ ꯈꯗꯥꯡ ꯄꯥꯟꯗꯕ, romanized: Lai Khadang Pandabi)
- The Doll's Groom (Meitei: ꯂꯥꯢꯐꯗꯤꯕꯤꯒꯤ ꯅꯨꯄꯥ, romanized: Laifadibigi Nupa)
- The Doll's Boon (Meitei: ꯂꯥꯢꯐꯗꯤꯕꯤꯒꯤ ꯊꯧꯖꯥꯜ, romanized: Laiphadibigi Thouchaal)
- The Seven Poor Sons (Meitei: ꯂꯥꯢꯔ ꯃꯆꯥ ꯇꯔꯦꯠ, romanized: Laira Macha Taret)
- The Python's Promise (Meitei: ꯂꯥꯢꯔꯦꯟꯅ ꯋꯥꯁꯛ ꯉꯥꯛꯄ, romanized: Lairen na Waashak Ngaakpa)
- The Widow's Son (Meitei: ꯂꯨꯈ꯭ꯔꯥꯕꯤ ꯃꯆꯥ, romanized: Lukhrabi Macha)
- The Widow and the Frog (Meitei: ꯂꯨꯈ꯭ꯔꯥꯕꯤ ꯑꯃꯗꯤ ꯍꯉꯣꯢ, romanized: Lukhrabi amadi Hangoi)
- The Demon Queen (Meitei: ꯂꯩꯃ ꯍꯤꯡꯆꯥꯕ, romanized: Leima Hingchabi)
- A Contest of Wit (Meitei: ꯂꯧꯁꯤꯡꯒꯤ ꯆꯥꯡꯗꯝꯅꯕ, romanized: Loushing gi Changdamnaba)
- Big Head (Meitei: ꯃꯀꯣꯛ, romanized: Makok)
- The Three-Headed Men (Meitei: ꯃꯀꯣꯛ ꯑꯍꯨꯝ, romanized: Makok Ahum)
- The Stepmother (Meitei: ꯃꯃꯥ ꯄꯣꯛꯇꯕ, romanized: Mama Poktabi)
- The Brother and Sister (Meitei: ꯃꯆꯤꯜ ꯃꯧꯄ꯭ꯋꯥ, romanized: Machil Moupwa)
- The Brother and Sister (Meitei: ꯃꯆꯤꯟ ꯃꯧꯄ, romanized: Machin Moupa)
- The Woman who Turned into a Parrot (Meitei: ꯃꯤꯅ ꯇꯦꯅꯋꯥ ꯑꯣꯟꯕ, romanized: Mee na Tenawa Onba)
- The Man who Turned into a Bird (Meitei: ꯃꯤꯅ ꯎꯊꯨꯝ ꯑꯣꯟꯕ, romanized: Mina Uthum Onkhiba)
- The Magic Stick (Meitei: ꯃꯤꯠꯇ꯭ꯔꯪꯒꯤ ꯆꯥ, romanized: Mitrang-gi Chei)
- The Magical Stool (Meitei: ꯃꯤꯠꯇ꯭ꯔꯪꯒꯤ ꯐꯥꯜ, romanized: Mitrang gi Fal)
- The Origin of Humans (Meitei: ꯃꯤꯒꯤ ꯍꯧꯔꯛꯐꯝ, romanized: Mee gi Hourakpham)
- The King's Umbrella (Meitei: ꯄꯦ ꯅꯥꯔꯦꯛꯄ, romanized: Pay Nareckpi)
- The Bird and the Tiger (Meitei: ꯄꯦꯕꯦꯠ ꯑꯃꯁꯨꯡ ꯀꯩ, romanized: Pebet amashung Kei)
- The Egotistical Elephant and the Praying Bird (Meitei: ꯅꯥꯄꯜ ꯆꯥꯎꯕ ꯁꯃꯨ ꯑꯃꯗꯤ ꯄꯦꯕꯦꯠ, romanized: Naapal Chaoba Shamu amadi Pebet)
- The Proud Bamboo (Meitei: ꯅꯥꯄꯜ ꯆꯥꯎꯕ ꯋꯥ ꯄꯥꯝꯕ, romanized: Naapal Chaoba Waa Pambi)
- The Proud Buffalo (Meitei: ꯅꯥꯄꯜ ꯆꯥꯎꯕ ꯏꯔꯣꯢ, romanized: Napal Chaoba Eeroi)
- Two Princes (Meitei: ꯅꯤꯡꯊꯧ ꯃꯆꯥꯅꯨꯄꯥ ꯑꯅꯨ, romanized: Ningthou Machanupa Ani)
- The Man who Shot the Sun (Meitei: ꯅꯨꯃꯤꯠ ꯀꯥꯞꯄ, romanized: Numit Kappa)
- The sun and the cock (Meitei: ꯅꯨꯃꯤꯠ ꯑꯃꯗꯤ ꯌꯦꯟꯕ, romanized: Numit amadi Yenba)
- Blessings from Spirit (Meitei: ꯇꯝꯅꯂꯥꯢꯒꯤ ꯊꯧꯖꯥꯜ, romanized: Tamnalai Gi Thoujal)
- Tapta (Meitei: ꯇꯞꯇꯥ)|
- The Seven Loaves (Meitei: ꯇꯟ ꯇꯔꯦꯠ, romanized: Tan Taret)
- The Human Python (Meitei: ꯇꯥꯢꯕꯪ ꯃꯤꯅ ꯂꯥꯢꯔꯦꯟ ꯑꯣꯟꯕ, romanized: Taibang Mee na Lairen Onba)
- Tembalaithak (Meitei: ꯇꯦꯝꯕꯂꯥꯢꯊꯛ)|
- Revenge on the Cat (Meitei: ꯇꯣꯛꯄ ꯂꯥꯟꯗꯥꯕ, romanized: Tokpa Laan-daaba)
- The Clever Hare (Meitei: ꯊꯦꯕ ꯂꯧꯁꯤꯡꯕ, romanized: Theba Lousingba)
- The Brave Friend (Meitei: ꯊꯧꯅꯥꯐꯕ ꯃꯔꯨꯞ, romanized: Thaunaphaba Marup)
- An Old Couple Plant Taro (Meitei: ꯍꯅꯨꯕ ꯍꯅꯨꯕꯤ ꯄꯥꯟ ꯊꯥꯕ, romanized: Hanuba Hanubi Paan Thaba)
- The Girl who Turned into a Cicada (Meitei: ꯍꯥꯎꯁꯤ ꯅꯃꯣꯢꯅꯨ, romanized: Haosi Namoinu)
- The Cruel Stepmother (Meitei: ꯍꯥꯎꯗꯤꯒꯝ ꯆꯅꯨ ꯐꯠꯇꯕ, romanized: Haodigam Chanu Phattabi)
- The Vampire (Meitei: ꯍꯤꯌꯥꯡ ꯑꯊꯧꯕ, romanized: Hiyangthau)
- Henjunaha (Meitei: ꯍꯦꯟꯖꯨꯅꯍꯩ)
- The Cat and the Bat (Meitei: ꯍꯧꯗꯣꯡ ꯁꯦꯛꯄꯤ ꯃꯔꯨꯞ ꯑꯅꯨ, romanized: Houdong Sekpi marup ani)
- The Mystic Cat and the Bird (Meitei: ꯍꯧꯗꯣꯡ ꯂꯝꯕꯣꯢꯕ ꯑꯃꯗꯤ ꯄꯦꯕꯦꯠ, romanized: Houdong Lamboiba amadi Pebet)
- The Cat's Nature (Meitei: ꯍꯧꯗꯣꯡꯒꯤ ꯂꯝꯆꯠ, romanized: Houdong gi Lamchat)
- The Carpenter and Chaoren (Meitei: ꯎ ꯁꯨꯕ ꯑꯃꯗꯤ ꯆꯥꯎꯔꯦꯟ, romanized: U suba amadi Chaoren)
- A Sculpted Wooden Face (Meitei: ꯎꯅ ꯁꯥꯕ ꯁꯛꯇꯝ, romanized: Una saba saktam)
- The Hornbill (Meitei: ꯎꯆꯦꯛ ꯂꯥꯡꯃꯩꯗꯣꯡ, romanized: Uchek Langmeidong)
- My Friendly Lamp (Meitei: ꯏꯇꯥ ꯊꯥꯎꯃꯩ, romanized: Eta Thangmei)
- A Foolish Younger Brother (Meitei: ꯑꯄꯪꯕ ꯃꯅꯥꯎ, romanized: Apangba Manao)
- The Foolish Man's Fortune (Meitei: ꯑꯄꯪꯕꯒꯤ ꯂꯥꯢꯕꯛ, romanized: Apangba gi Laibak)
- The Truth-telling Fruit (Meitei: ꯑꯆꯨꯝꯕ ꯉꯥꯡꯕꯒꯤ ꯃꯍꯩ, romanized: Achumba ngangba gi mahei)
- Child Who Turned into a Pumpkin (Meitei: ꯑꯉꯥꯡꯗꯒꯤ ꯃꯥꯢꯔꯦꯟ ꯑꯣꯟꯕ, romanized: Angangdagi Mairen Onba)

== See also ==
- The Tales of Kanglei Throne
- And That Is Why... Manipuri Myths Retold
- Phungawari Shingbul : A Collection Of Manipuri Folk Tales And Fables compiled and edited by B. Jayantakumara Sharma.
- New Folktales of Manipur, by James Oinam.
- Collection of Folk Tales from Manipur from E-pao.
