= Laphumaton =

Folk tale
- Name: Laphumaton
- Also known as: Lafumaton
- Aarne–Thompson grouping: no
- Mythology: Meitei mythology, Meitei folklore
- Country: India
- Region: Manipur
- Origin Date: unknown
- Published in: Manipuri Fungawari (Manipuri Phungawari)

Laphumaton, also written as Lafumaton (ꯂꯐꯨꯃꯇꯣꯟ), is a folktale from the Meitei tradition of Kangleipak (modern day Manipur). It tells the story of a young man named Laphumaton, his travels, his marriages, and his struggles with a king. The tale includes themes of obedience, courage, cleverness, and hidden strengths.

== Story ==
=== Early life ===
A widow lived alone with her son. She raised him by herself. When he grew into a handsome young man, she told him that his father had wished for him to earn his own wealth. The boy took a fishing line and went to a river to catch fish. Instead of a fish, a golden lotus was caught in his hook. He brought the lotus home and placed it in his mother's hands.

The widow decided to offer the lotus to the king. The king admired it and ordered her to bring the plant that produced the flower. He told her that if she and her son failed to bring the plant within three days, they would be exiled.

=== Search for the Golden Lotus Plant ===
Laphumaton decided to search for the plant. He travelled east and reached a faraway land, where he met Princess Shabireima and her friends at a pond. The princess decided she would marry him, and the girls took Laphumaton to the palace.

The king of the land agreed to the marriage. Later, Laphumaton married another princess, Nganureima, in another kingdom. He explained to his wives that he had come because of a punishment from his own king and that he needed to continue his search.

He travelled on and met a third princess, Khunureima. She also wished to marry him, and the king of that land agreed. When Laphumaton told the king that he was searching for a plant that produced a golden lotus, the king showed him a pond where such a plant grew.

Before taking the plant, Laphumaton prayed for his misery to be removed. He uprooted the plant and returned to the homes of Khunureima, Shabireima, and Nganureima, taking them with him. He returned to his mother and gave her the lotus plant to offer to the king.

=== King's demands ===
The king planted the lotus carefully. But after hearing about Laphumaton's three beautiful wives, he became jealous and wished to take them as his own queens. He began giving Laphumaton impossible tasks.

First task
picking seeds

The king ordered Laphumaton to pick up hajam (skeel tree) seeds that would be scattered over ploughed land. Laphumaton was sad, but Khunureima comforted him. She prayed to her father for help, and he sent one thousand pigeons. The pigeons gathered every seed, and the task was completed perfectly.

Second task
gathering paddy from a pond

Next, the king threw two baskets of paddy into a pond and ordered Laphumaton to collect every grain by the next morning. Nganureima asked her father for help. He sent five hundred ducks, who dived into the pond and gathered all the paddy.

Third task
jumping into a bonfire

The king then declared that Laphumaton must jump into a bonfire. Shabireima prayed to her father, who sent three hundred porcupines. They dug a large underground tunnel from her house to the bonfire pit.

Before leaving, Shabireima instructed Laphumaton to circle the fire and then jump from the southern side into the burrow. Laphumaton prayed and obeyed. He escaped through the tunnel and returned safely to his house.

=== After the escape ===
The king's men came to tell Laphumaton's wives to go to the palace, thinking Laphumaton had died. Laphumaton spoke from inside the house, telling the men that wrongdoing cannot stand against what is right. The king was shocked and regretted the injustice he had done.

From that day, he treated Laphumaton as a friend and allowed him to live like a second king. Laphumaton and his wives lived a peaceful and contented life.

== Character names and meanings ==
The story itself explains the meanings of several names:

- Khunureima (Khunu Leima): From khunu meaning "pigeon" and reima (leima), meaning "princess"/"queen"/"lady".
- Nganureima (Nganu Leima): From nganu, meaning "duck".
- Shabireima (Shapi Leima): From shabi, said to mean "porcupine"/"rodent" in this tale.
- The name Laphumaton comes from laphu, meaning "plantain", and maton, meaning "top" or possibly "bud". A plantain stem has many layers. The story shows that Laphumaton also has many hidden traits, which appear over time like the layers or bud of a plantain.

== Themes ==
The tale presents Laphumaton as a man with many qualities:

- He obeys the king like a loyal servant.
- He shows bravery by facing impossible tasks.
- He becomes a friend to the king and lives like a second king.
- He protests when the king tries to take his wives, even though he obeyed earlier harsh demands.

The story suggests that Laphumaton's hidden strengths appear gradually, just as new layers or buds appear in a plantain stem.

== See also ==
- Lai Khutsangbi
- Lai Khadang Pandabi
- Yenakha Paotabi
- Helloi
- Hingchabi
