= Lai Phattaba =

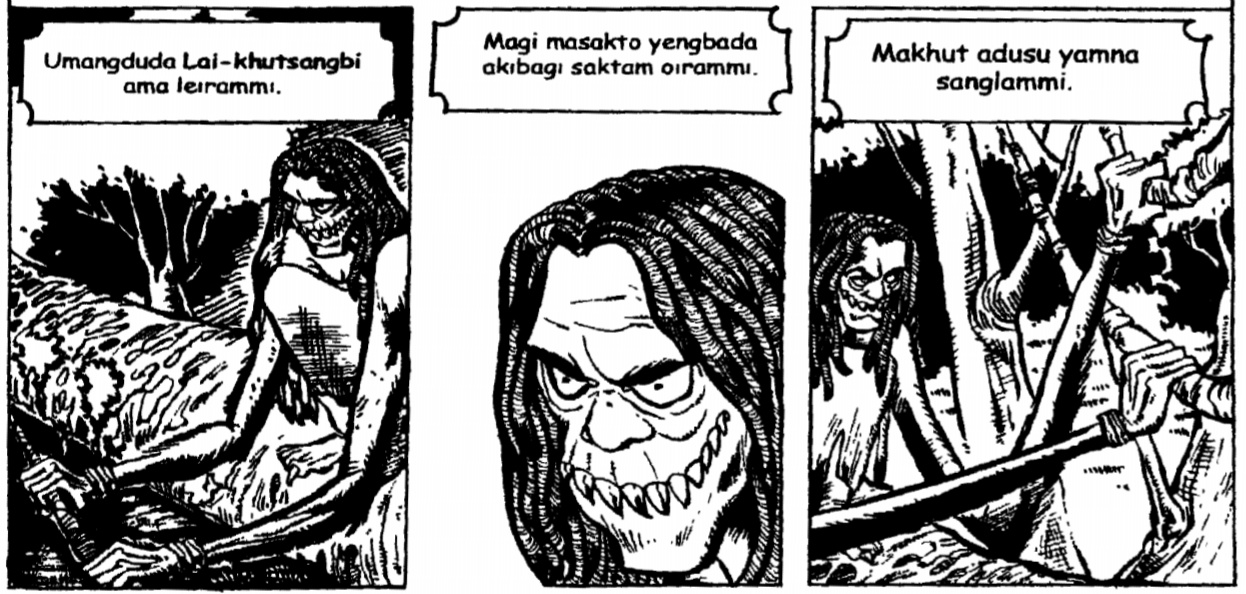
Lai Khutsangbi, a type of Lai Phataba being

Lai Phattaba (ꯂꯥꯏ ꯐꯠꯇꯕ), also spelled as Lai Phataba (ꯂꯥꯏ ꯐꯇꯕ), is a term in the Meitei language that refers to an evil spirit.

== In different beliefs ==
Even in Meitei terminology, in monotheistic religions, there is usually only one evil spirit, similar to the single holy spirit. This spirit, often called the devil, represents darkness and opposition to light, symbolizing the contrast between good and evil.

In polytheistic religions, there are many evil spirits, just as there are many benevolent spirits.

== In Meitei polytheism ==
Meitei polytheism recognizes multiple evil spirits, which can be grouped according to their nature and domain:

- Dark and mischievous spirits
  - Laimu – a spirit of black or dark nature
  - Sharoi (alias Saroi) – a mischievous or evil-following spirit of divinity
  - Sharoi-ngaroi (alias saroi ngaroi, literally meaning, "beast and fish creatures") – a form of Sharoi
  - Laimu-Teenmu – similar to Laimu
- Demonic and haunting spirits
  - Lai-hingcha – a demonic spirit
  - Tamna-Lai – a haunting evil spirit
  - Hiyang-Athouba – a vampire-like spirit
  - Laikhut-shangbee – a long-handed evil spirit
- Presiding spirits of land and water
  - Lammaba – the presiding evil spirit of land
  - Tumaba – the presiding evil spirit of water or submerged land

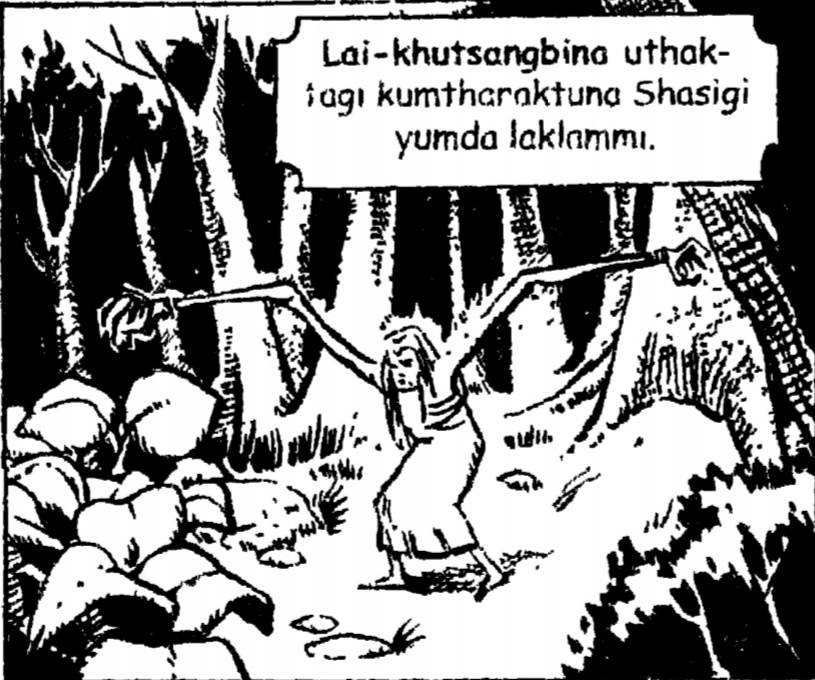
Lai Khutshangbi, a type of Lai Phataba, coming to human settlement to cause bad things

=== Rituals and offerings ===
When offering food to the Lai Phataba spirit, devotees always face east. This is considered the correct direction for prayer. It is believed to roam around the surroundings of every family. During the offering, the head of the family places the food on a plantain leaf set on a bronze plate. He also carries a small traditional knife, called Heijrang in Meitei language.

== See also ==
- Meitei mythology
- Meitei folklore
- Yenakha Paodabi
- Lai Khadang Pandabi
- Keibu Keioiba
- Kei Onba water
- Helloi
- Hingchabi
