= Hiyang Athouba =

Hiyang Athouba (ꯍꯤꯌꯥꯡ ꯑꯊꯧꯕ)

Folk tale
- Name: Hiyang Athouba (ꯍꯤꯌꯥꯡ ꯑꯊꯧꯕ)
- Also known as: Heeyang Athouba, Hiyangthau or Hiyangthou (ꯍꯤꯌꯥꯡꯊꯧ)
- Aarne–Thompson grouping: no
- Mythology: Meitei mythology and folklore
- Country: India
- Region: ancient Kangleipak (early Manipur)
- Origin Date: antiquity
- Published in: Meitei literature
- Related: Lai Khutshangbi, Yenakha Paotabi, Hingchabis, Helloi Taret, etc.

Hiyang Athouba (ꯍꯤꯌꯥꯡ ꯑꯊꯧꯕ), also written as Heeyang Athouba, Hiyangthau or Hiyangthou (ꯍꯤꯌꯥꯡꯊꯧ), is a figure in Meitei mythology and folklore of ancient Kangleipak (early Manipur). It refers to a corpse that transforms into a demon-like, monstrous, or vampire-like being. Folktales in Meitei tradition describe numerous cases in which dead human bodies undergo such a transformation. A frequently told narrative describes the transformation of a woman who dies alone and becomes a Hiyangthau. It is considered as one of the Lai Phattaba beings or the evil spirits in traditional Meitei beliefs.

== Folkloric context ==
Within Meitei tradition, the Hiyang Athouba is understood as a supernatural entity originating from a human corpse. Some stories describe the transformation as occurring when a dead body remains unattended and certain events—such as an animal, especially black cat, passing over the corpse—take place. The transformed being is often said to appear in the likeness of the deceased person.

== Synopsis of a traditional narrative ==
=== Separation of a couple ===
In one folktale, a poor married couple is forced to work continuously for daily sustenance. When the wife becomes pregnant, the husband advises her to rest and assumes full responsibility for earning food. He borrows money from a wealthy neighbour to support her for several months and then departs for a foreign land to seek further income. During his prolonged absence, the wife becomes increasingly worried as her resources diminish.

=== Illness, neglect, and death ===
The woman eventually falls ill and becomes bedridden. Neighbours initially assist her but later withdraw due to their own obligations and resentment towards the absent husband. Left unattended, the woman dies, and her body remains undiscovered in the house. According to the folktale, a cat jumps over the corpse, triggering her transformation into a Hiyangthau.

=== Husband’s return ===
Several days later, the husband returns at night carrying silver he has earned. When he calls for his wife, the Hiyangthau responds using her voice and invites him inside. He observes her in disordered clothing with unkempt hair and unusual behaviour. Upon noticing signs of her damaged body, he becomes frightened as she reveals enlarged teeth and stares at him with wide eyes. He flees the house.

=== Attempted escape ===
As he runs through the village, the husband pleads for neighbours to open their gates, but none respond because it is late at night. He climbs a liana to escape. The Hiyangthau is unable to touch the liana and throws stones at him before waiting below. At dawn, when birds begin to chirp, the entity returns to the house and reverts to a lifeless corpse.

=== Discovery and cremation ===
The husband descends and informs the neighbours of the events. They accompany him to the house and discover the woman's body. A knowledgeable villager identifies the situation as a case of transformation into a Hiyangthau and warns that the corpse must be cremated immediately with appropriate ceremonies to prevent further reanimation.

The neighbours arrange the funeral, and the husband performs the required rites. Filled with regret for leaving his wife alone, he demolishes the house, sells the land, and later departs on a pilgrimage, never returning to the village.

== Cultural significance ==
The narrative illustrates themes of neglect, social responsibility, and supernatural retribution within Meitei folklore. It reflects local beliefs regarding death, improper care of the deceased, and the potential consequences of abandonment.

== See also ==
- Traditional Meitei religion
- Yenakha Paodabi
- Lai Khutsangbi
- Lai Khadang Pandabi
- Keibu Keioiba
- Kei Onba water
- Helloi
- Hingchabi
