= Manipuri duck =

Manipuri duck may refer to:

- Any of the indigenous duck breeds found natively in Manipur
  - Meitei Nganu, one of the many duck breeds found in Manipur
- Nganu Leima, a duck goddess of the Meitei religion of Manipur
- One of the ducks mentioned in the Manipuri folktale of Laphumaton
