= Sandrembi and Chaisra =

Ancient Meitei folktale

Sandrembi and Chaisra (Sanarembi and Chaisra)
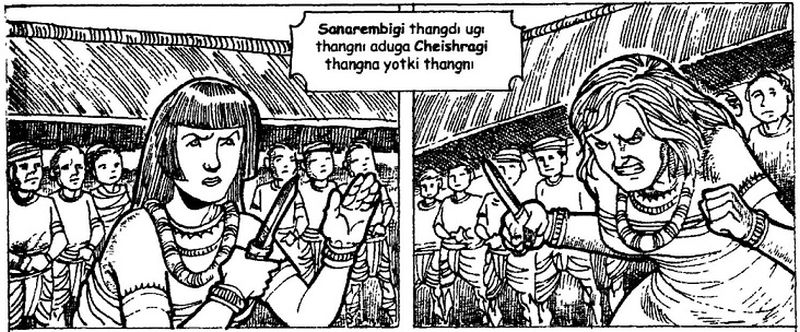
- The fight between Sandrembi (true queen) and Chaisra (false queen) in the trial by ordeal

Folk tale
- Name: Sandrembi and Chaisra (Sanarembi and Chaisra)
- Mythology: Meitei mythology
- Country: Ancient Kangleipak (historical); India (present)
- Region: Kangleipak (Meitei for 'Manipur')
- Related: Helloi, Lai Khutsangbi, Thabaton, Uchek Langmeidong, Yenakha Paotapi

The legend of Sandrembi and Chaisra (Meitei: ꯁꯟꯗ꯭ꯔꯦꯝꯕꯤ ꯆꯥꯢꯁ꯭ꯔꯥ) or Sanarembi and Chaisra (Meitei: ꯁꯅꯔꯦꯝꯕꯤ ꯆꯥꯢꯁ꯭ꯔꯥ) is a folktale of the Meitei ethnicity of Ancient Kangleipak (early Manipur). It is a story of the clash between two stepsisters, Sandrembi (Sanarembi), the elder, and Chaisra, the younger, born to the same father but different mothers. Sandrembi, the protagonist, is a young lady, living in forsaken environment and in dire circumstances that are changed into a remarkable fortune. She is portrayed as a person having the nature of God like mind.

== Reception ==
The story of Sandrembi and Chaisra is considered a perfect combination of "Cinderella" and "The Three Oranges".

== Story ==
=== Beginning ===
In an era called Haya Chak, King Sentreng Apanba ruled the realm of Ancient Kangleipak (early Manipur). Khulen Nganba, one of the King's nobleman, had two good ladies, the senior lady named Yangkhuleima (aka Yangkhureima, Yaibireima or Yaipileima) and the junior lady named Sangkhuleima (aka Sankhureima). (Note: The names of the two ladies are rhyming words and are often confused with each other. So, in the subsequent passages, the terms "elder lady" ("senior lady") and "younger lady" ("junior lady") are used to refer to the two to avoid confusion.) The elder lady had a daughter named Sandrembi (Sanarembi) (and also boy in another version of the story) and the younger lady had only one daughter named Chaisra (aka Cheisra). Nobleman Khulen Nganba died after some time. And so the two widows sold vegetables and fishes caught from Shilempat (Meitei for 'Shilem lake') in the market to earn their living. The younger widow was jealous of the elder widow. And so, she always planned for ways to harm the elder lady. One day, it so happened that the elder lady caught many fish but the younger lady caught some snakes and reptiles and not a single fish. While both the widows were taking rest under a fig tree, the younger widow, getting envious of the elder lady's lucky catch, hatched an evil plan to kill her. This, the younger lady climbed up the fig tree to pluck some fruits. Once or twice she dropped the ripped fig fruits to the elder lady who enjoyed of the juicy fruits. And finally, the younger lady made the elder lady close her eyes and open her mouth wide telling her to swallow the most delicious fruit which she said she was about to drop down. Then, the younger lady poured the snakes from her fish basket. The poor elder woman swallowed them and died immediately due to snake bite. The younger lady came down and pushed the dead body of the elder lady into the deep water of the lake. The corpse transformed into a tortoise (or turtle) unknown to anyone. The younger lady told everyone about the tragic death of the elder widow was due to drowning in the lake. In another version of the story, the younger lady told others that the stubborn elder lady didn't want to return home and chose to catch fish further until sunset.

=== Childhood ===
The younger widow and her daughter Chaisra (Cheisra) mistreated Sandrembi (Shanarembi) after her mother's death. One night, Sandrembi saw her mother in her dream, revealing the truth behind her tragic death. Her mother told her to bring the tortoise from the lake and keep it inside a pitcher for five consecutive days without any break at which only she could re-assume her human form. Sandrembi did so but before the completion of the five days, Chaisra discovered the tortoise and so, she insisted her mother to make Sandrembi cook the tortoise meat for her. The stepmother forced poor Sandrembi to boil the tortoise. Sandrembi tried to take away the fuel stick on hearing the tortoise mother's words from the boiling pan/pot but she could not save her tortoise mother before them.

Chaisra and her mother devoured the tortoise meat to their heart's content and threw away the bones in the verandah. Again the tortoise mother told Sandrembi in her dream to keep the tortoise bones undisturbed inside a basket by covering it with a cloth for 7 consecutive days. Sandrembi did so. However, before the completion of the said period, out of her anxiety as well as curiosity, Sandrembi opened the basket and as it disturbed the normal process of regaining the human shape, the tortoise mother came out in the form of a sparrow and flew away.

=== Married life and death ===
Many years died and the two stepsisters grew up. Sandrembi, became beautiful and accomplished but not nicely dressed up. Chaisra became ugly although properly dressed. Once a King ("Crown Prince" in another version of the story) came for hunting and saw the two maidens fetching water by a riverside. Knowing the quality of Sandrembi's beauty and elegance, though not wearing nice clothes, the king immediately took Sandrembi away with him (after some days or weeks in other versions of the story). She was made the Queen after a ceremonial marriage. She spent her life ("with her brother" in another version of the story) with joy in the palace. A son was also born to her, named Machi Sana Melei Khomba in Meitei sacred lores. Her stepmother and her stepsister Chaisra were still jealous of her luck. So, the two planned to kill Sandrembi. They invited her for a dinner in their house. Sandrembi came to her parental house with the permission of the King. After the dinner, Chaisra, according to their plan, dropped Sandrembi's dresses under a bed ("in a hole" in another version of the story). When Sandrembi went under the bed to bring the clothes out, her stepmother poured the hottest water over Sandrembi's body. Poor Sandrembi died and her soul (or corpse in another version of the story) got transformed into a pigeon and flew away. Chaisra, disguising as Sandrembi in the Queen's dress, went to the palace and behaved as if she was the real Sandrembi. The suspected king told her in anger, "You are not my queen whose face is as fair as the lily. You are disfigured." Chaisra answered that she contracted mental and physical agony when she wept for her son. The king noticed Chaisra's long nose, deep eyes and bushy eyelids, which are contrasting to Sandrembi's features. When asked about her sudden ugliness, Chaisra told him that crying and rubbing her eyes all her way due to missing the king make her ugly. In spite of his suspicion, the King wanted suitable opportunity to detect if she was a false queen.

=== Words of the pigeon ===
In the meantime, the pigeon (transformation of Sandrembi after her death) flew into the Royal Garden, perched on a tree branch and addressed to the Royal Gardener ("grass cutter" in another version of the story) concerning the forgetfulness of the King about Queen Sandrembi, animal epidemic in the kingdom, grievances of the Prince and loss of the gardener's own sickle along with a warning for reporting these words to the King. The king, on getting the report, came to the pigeon with grains of paddy in his hands. The King kept the supernatural bird in his palace. Even as a bird, she took away the dirty things from the Prince's eyes. During the King's absence, Chaisra killed the bird and prepared a nice meal from the meat. Upon knowing that the meat was that of the talking pigeon, the king refused to consume it and buried it behind the Royal Kitchen.

=== Fruit lady ===
The remains of the meats and the bones of the pigeon in the ground grew up as a lucious fruit plant and it bore full of fruits overnight ("only one fruit" in another version). Chaisra gave the lucious fruit as a gift to a monk ("servant" in another version of the story). The man kept the fruit inside a jar in his house since that fruit was not yet ripen enough to be eaten. Later, it so happened to him that fruit disappeared when the knife was available in many times and knife disappeared when the fruit was found in other times. One early morning, he went out for work. Returning home, he was surprised to find that his cottage had been washed and his meal had been cooked by someone. He kept the mystery concealed for some days and was determined to find it out by any means. One day, long before the first streak of sun light came, he woke up and pretended to be gone some distance away and secretly entered the cottage silently and peeped into his own room. At sunrise, he saw a beautiful woman coming out of the jar (where he kept the fruit) and roaming in kitchen for house work. "It is a fruit maiden", he muttered. Recognising her as Queen Sandrembi, he took her to the king. There was a quarrel between Sandrembi and Chaisra, on the issue of the identity of the real Queen. The obstinate Chaisra denied the whole story and called Sandrembi to be a "fruit maiden".

=== Trial by ordeal ===
At long last, the king decided to settle the case by appealing to a divine ordeal. The two had to fight a duel with swords. As per the code, the defendant was allowed to use a bright and sharp sword but the plaintiff (Sandrembi) had to use a rusty knife ("wooden knife" in another version of the story) for on her part laid the burden of proof. It was thought that if justice was really on her, she would win in spite of using a rusty sword. Chaisra had no belief in the trial by ordeal and was hopeful that she would be able to kill her rival with one stroke. Her demand for use of the bright sword was a legitimate one. Sandrembi had the faith in her, "If I am innocent, may Chaisra's sword become harmless to me." In the arena, while Chaisra hewed and hacked at her with her sharp sword, Sandrembi remained unharmed. Suddenly, the blunt sword, of its own accord, slipped out of Sandrembi's hand and chopped off Chaisra's neck. In another version of the story, there was no fighting between them. Sandrembi, the elder pardoned Chaisra, the younger. Both of them lived together as chief queen and younger queen respectively in great happiness.

== Editions ==
- In 1978, the story of Sandrembi and Chaisra was reproduced into a book by N. Manijao.
- In 1993, the folktale of Sandrembi and Chaisra was re-written by Memchaubi and was published by Aribam Samarendra.

== Gallery ==
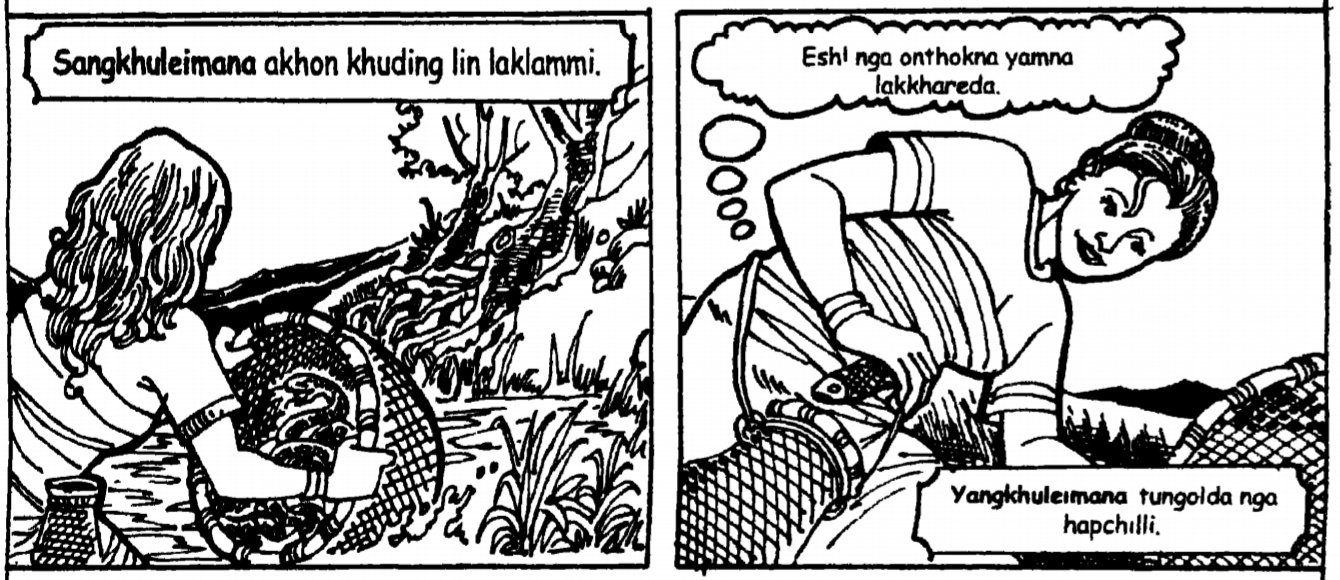

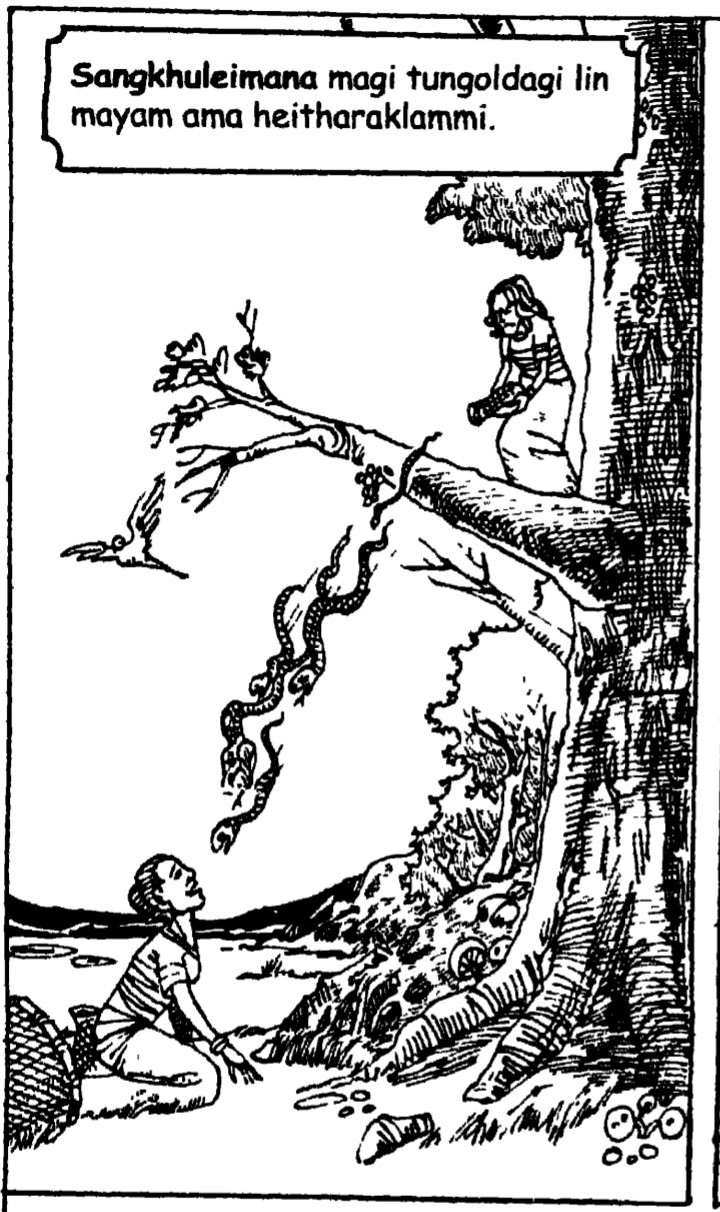

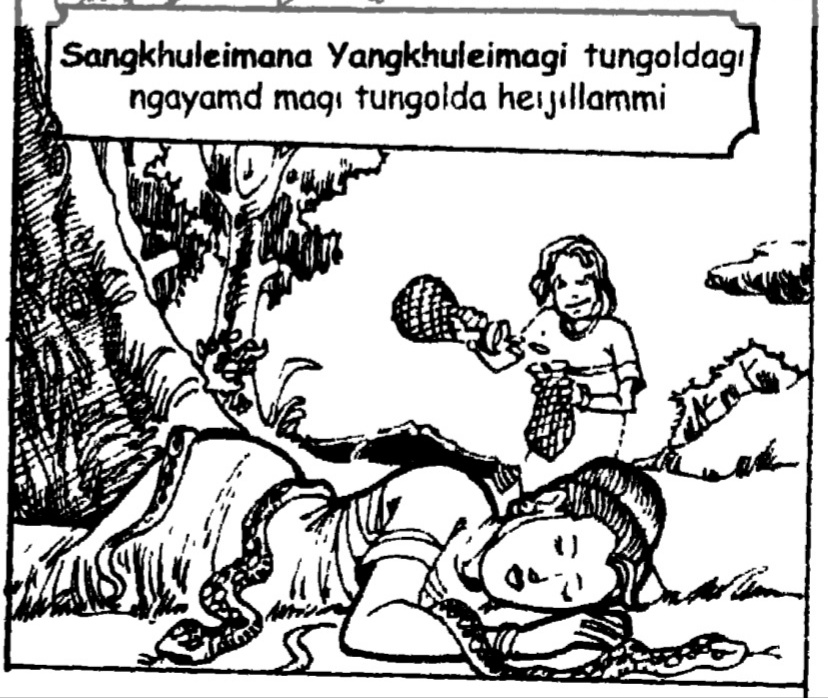

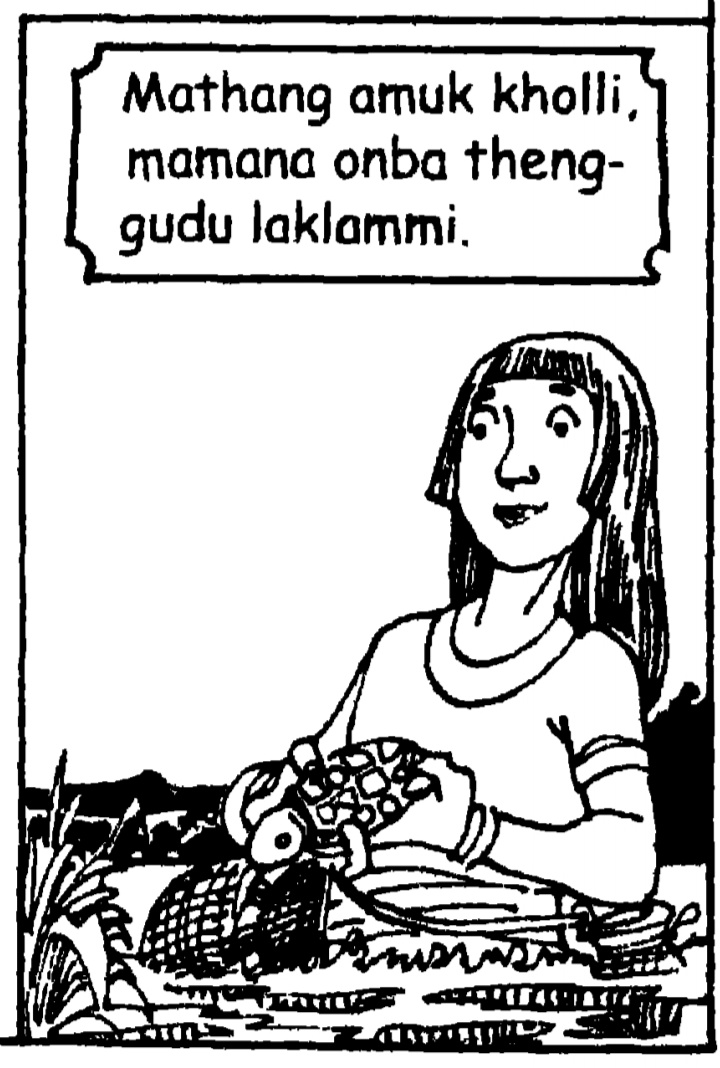

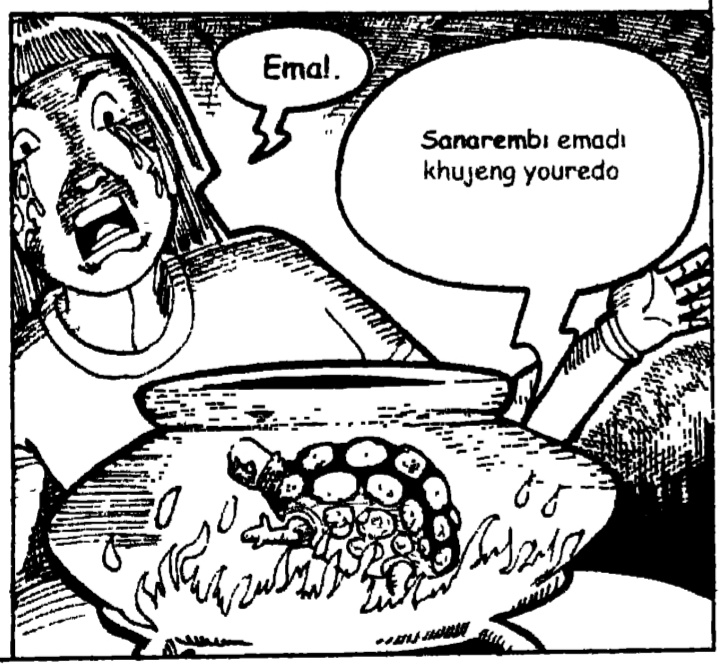

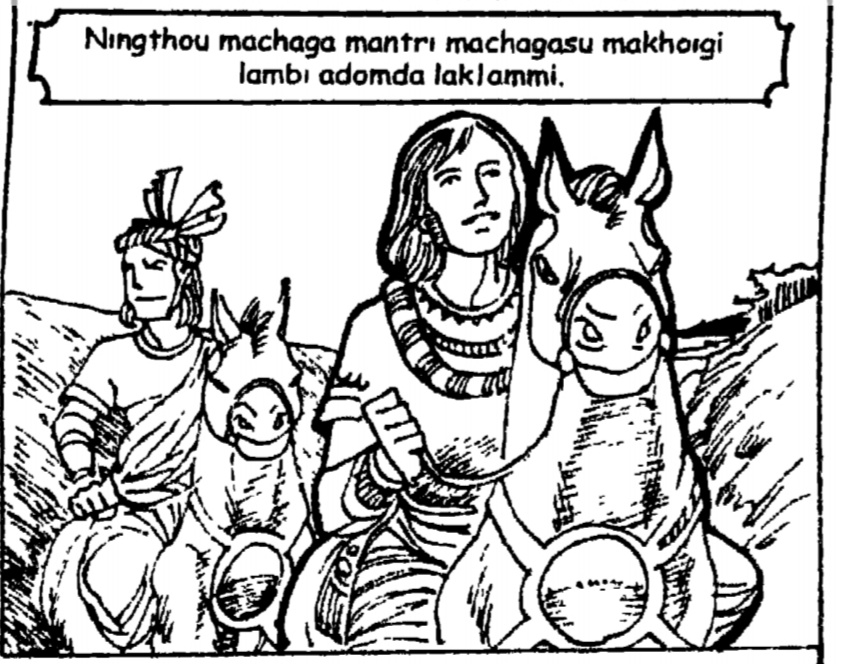

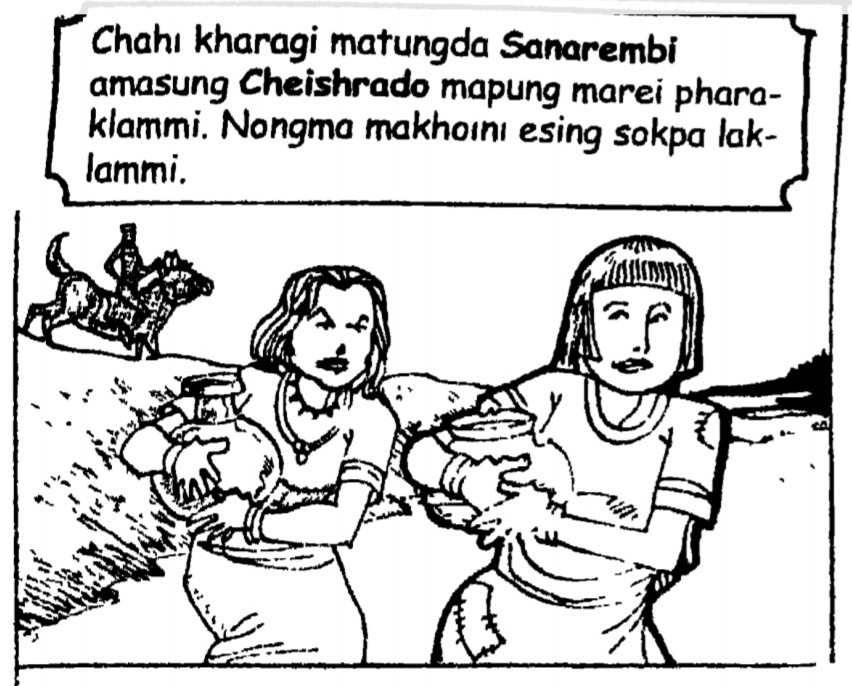

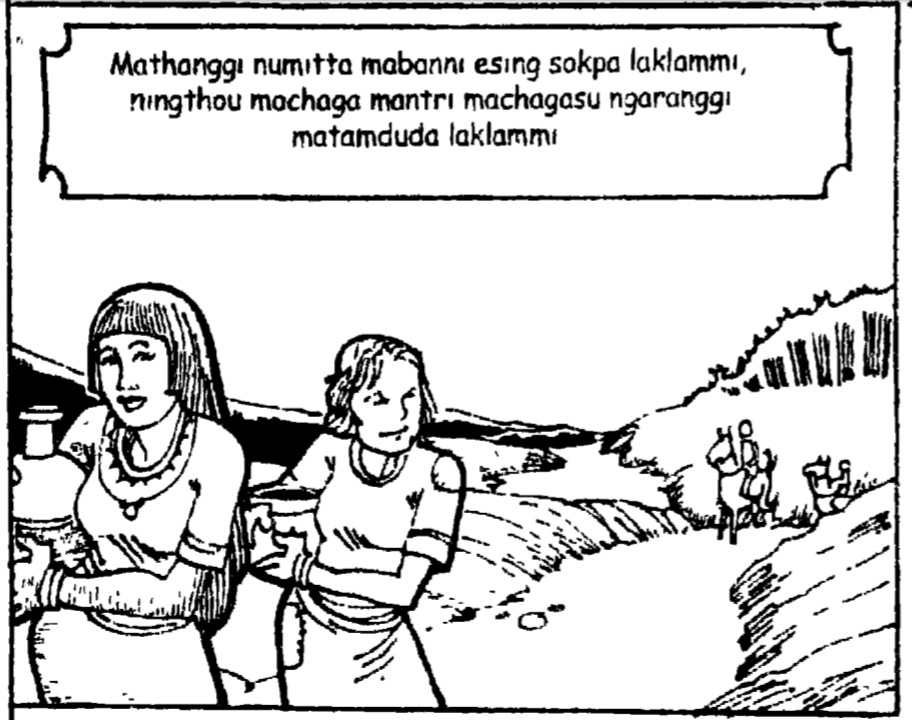

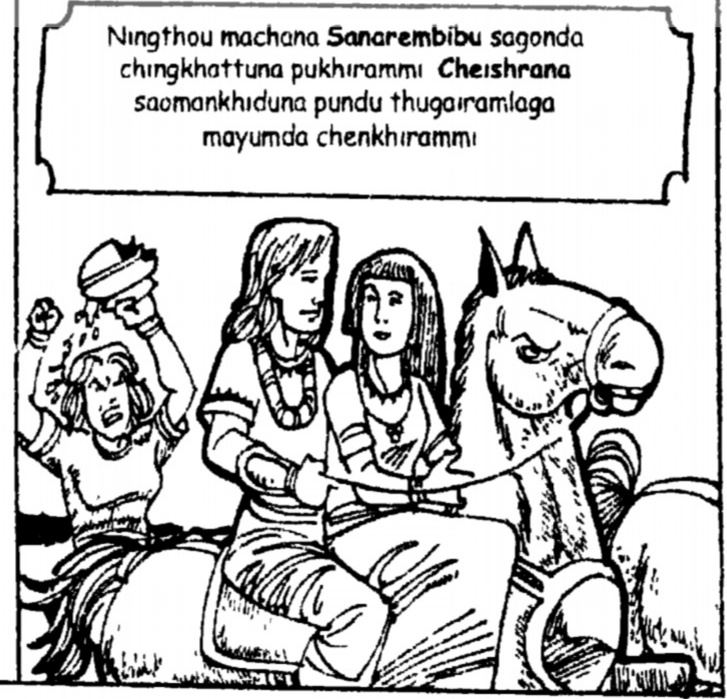

== See also ==
- List of Meitei folktales
- The King of the Snakes
- The Younger Sister Marries the Snake
- Schalanggor

== Bibliography ==
- "Sandrembi Chaishra: A Manipuri Folk Tale by Bonny Elangbam". Goodreads.
- "Sandrembi Chaishra: A Manipuri Folk Tale". Goodreads.
- Ibomacā, Ẏūmalembama (2017). Come Out Sandrembi, We Will Make a Grandiose Home for You. Manipur State Kala Akademi. ISBN 978-81-908813-1-9.
- "The Forgotten Sandrembi By Omila Thounaojam". www.e-pao.net.
