= Ita Thaomei =

Ancient Meitei folktale

Folk tale
- Name: Ita Thaomei
- Also known as: Eta Thaomei or Eta Thangmei
- Aarne–Thompson grouping: no
- Mythology: Meitei mythology
- Country: India
- Region: Manipur
- Related: Yenakha Paotapi; Pebet; Lai Khutshangbi; Khambrangchak; Keibu Keioiba

Ita Thaomei, also known as Eta Thaomei (Meitei: ꯏꯇꯥ ꯊꯥꯎꯃꯩ, lit. 'Friend lamp'), or Eta Thangmei (Meitei: ꯏꯇꯥ ꯊꯥꯡꯃꯩ), is a Meitei folktale from Manipur. It is the story of a lonely old woman, her lamp (Meitei: Thaomei) and a thief.

== Title ==
The Meitei language terms, "Ita" or "Eta" (Meitei: ꯏꯇꯥ) literally means “female friend", and "Thaomei" (Meitei: ꯊꯥꯎꯃꯩ / ꯊꯥꯑꯣꯃꯩ) means "oil lamp" or "oil-fire".

== Story ==
In a village, there lived an elderly widow who resided alone. She was diligent, spending her days weaving on the loom and her nights spinning. Alongside her hard work, she was known for her wisdom and wit. One dark night, a thief crept into her house silently while she was spinning by the fireside. A thaomei (transl. oil lamp) was burning nearby. The thief concealed himself in a dark corner, waiting for the old woman to fall asleep. After a while, the woman sensed someone hiding behind the thaomei. Though frightened, she acted as if she was unaware of the thief's presence and continued spinning.

She quickly came up with a plan to catch the thief. She called out, "Ita-thaomei! Ita-thaomei!" When there was no answer, she continued, "How strange that you haven't replied today. We chat every day. What's wrong today? Are you sleepy, or is there an intruder in the house tonight?" The thief was astonished. The woman spoke loudly, "Ita-thaomei, if you don't reply, it means there's an intruder in the house." The thief thought, "Incredible! A thaomei that answers a human call. Maybe it's silent because I'm here. I can't let her know I'm here. I'll answer her call this time. She'll think everything is normal." Soon, the old woman called again, "Ita-thaomei, can you hear me?" The thief replied, "Yes Ita, I can hear you." The widow was now certain. She knew she could easily catch the thief. She asked, "Were you asleep a little while ago?" "Yes, I felt very sleepy and dozed off for a bit," the thief replied. The widow continued, "As usual, let me tell you a story. Listen carefully." "I'm listening, please go on," the thief responded.

The old widow began her story: "Once upon a time, there lived an old woman in a village. She lived alone. One night, while spinning, she fell asleep. In her dream, she saw a thief breaking into her house. Actually a thief had already broken into her house and was trying to steal the utensils in the house. The old woman woke up and saw it. Immediately, she began to shout, "Thief, thief. There is 'a thief in my house." The old widow actually kept shouting at the top of her voice. Her neighbours woke up and rushed to her house, where they caught the thief and thanked the clever widow.

== In popular culture ==
The Meitei language animation film Ita Thaomei, inspired by the folk tale of the same name, was officially launched at the Software Technology Park of India in Mantripukhri. This groundbreaking 40-minute film was produced by X-treme Wave. Dr. Thangjam Rabikanta took on the role of art director, while the animation work was carried out by Rajkumar Sanahal and Wairokpam Trishinath. Hijam Satyabrata, a cartoonist, also contributed by designing various characters. The movie had a budget of around ₹15 lakhs.

== See also ==
- One Thousand and One Nights
