= Lai Khadang Pandabi =

Lai Khadang Pandabi (ꯂꯥꯏ ꯈꯗꯥꯡ ꯄꯥꯟꯗꯕꯤ)
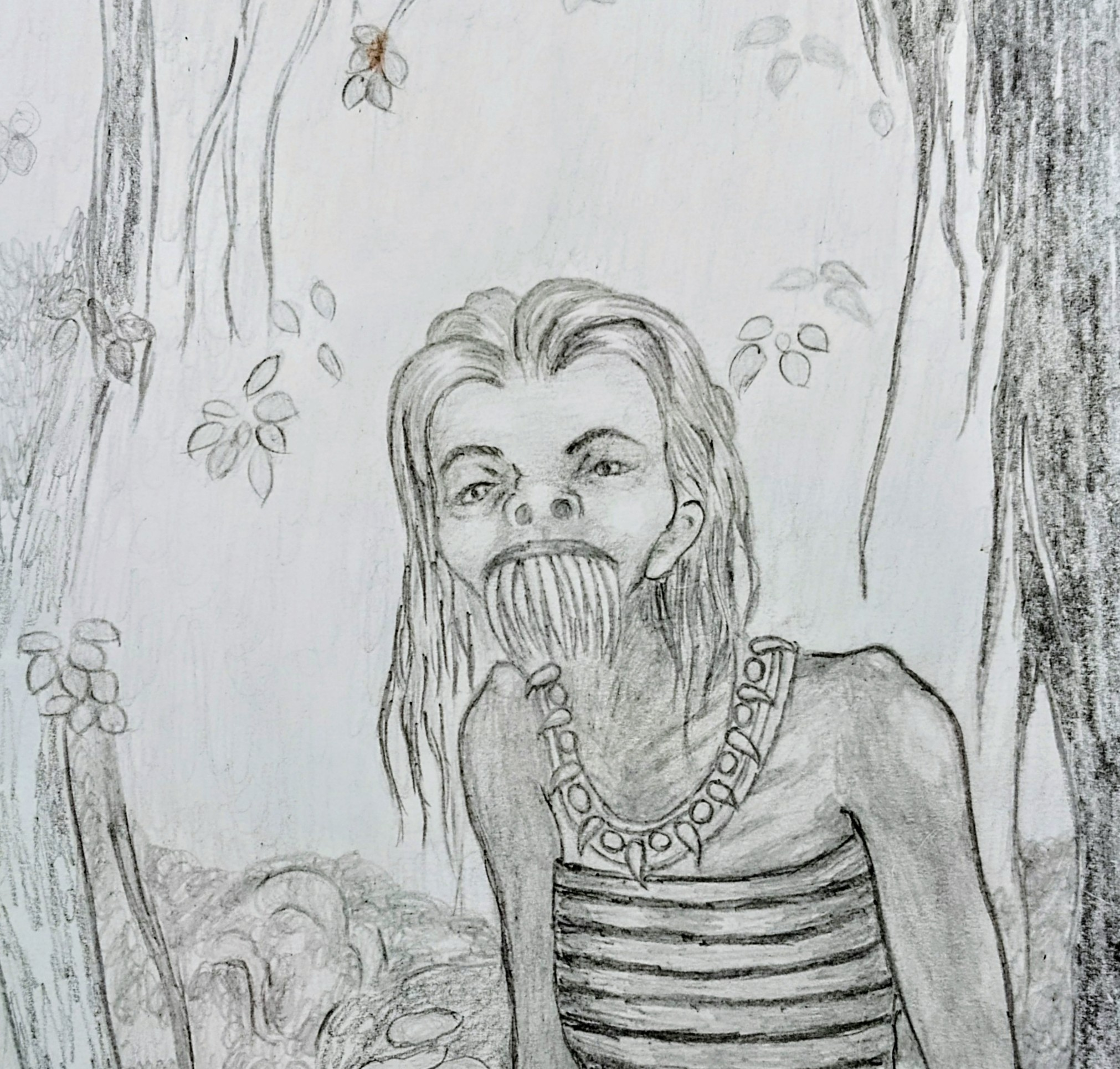
- An illustration of Lai Khadang Pandabi

Folk tale
- Name: Lai Khadang Pandabi (ꯂꯥꯏ ꯈꯗꯥꯡ ꯄꯥꯟꯗꯕꯤ)
- Also known as: the devil without jaws; the witch without chin; the cheekless woman; Lai Khadang Yaodabi
- Mythology: Meitei mythology
- Country: India
- Region: Manipur
- Origin Date: unknown

Lai Khadang Pandabi (ꯂꯥꯏ ꯈꯗꯥꯡ ꯄꯥꯟꯗꯕꯤ), also spelled as Lai Khadaang Paandabi, also known as the devil without jaws, or the witch without chin, or the cheekless woman, is a traditional folktale from Meitei culture of Ancient Kangleipak (early Manipur). The tale tells the story of a dishonest and lazy woman who tricks her hardworking husband and is later caught for her actions.

== Characters ==
- The Husband: A diligent and responsible man who works hard in the fields and takes care of his family.
- The Wife: A lazy and selfish woman who avoids household duties and deceives her husband.

== Summary ==
=== Daily life of the couple ===
In a village, a man and his wife lived together. The husband was industrious, working both in his garden and traveling to earn money. Despite his efforts, he rarely had time to rest. In contrast, the wife avoided housework and was mostly concerned with eating flavorful meals.

Although the husband brought food home regularly, the wife pretended to be careful with resources. She cooked only fish heads and bones with minimal salt when her husband was present. Once he left for work, she prepared and ate rich meals using dried fish such as ngakra, ngamu, and ngafak without sharing.

=== Invention of the witch ===
To hide her actions, the wife made a story about a supernatural being. She claimed that a creature known as the "Witch Without Chin" was stealing the food stored in the house, particularly the dried fish.

She supported her claim by suggesting that the witch had also visited other homes, including one belonging to a woman named Leirik, and stolen their food as well. The husband pretended to believe her but began to suspect the truth.

=== Husband's strategy ===
The husband decided to investigate. He told his wife that he was going to another village for a land-related matter and might stay overnight. He asked her to prepare food early. She served her husband a watery curry made only of leafy greens and fish heads. After eating a small portion, the husband pretended to leave but returned secretly to hide and observe her. Believing herself to be alone, the wife began to prepare a meal for herself using vegetables and a variety of dried fish.

=== Revelation of the truth ===
From his hiding place, the husband watched the wife bring out a storage box called ngarubak and cook dried fish with peas, potatoes, and onions. She prepared a large portion of rice and curry for herself and ate it alone. Due to her unusually short chin, she dropped food while eating, making the kitchen messy with bones and chili skins.

The husband then confronted her, exposing her behavior and referring to her as the "Witch Without Chin." Embarrassed and ashamed, the wife fled to her parents' home.

== Moral ==
The folktale conveys a lesson about honesty and proper behavior. It warns that greed, poor manners, and dishonesty may eventually lead to public shame and consequences. Sharing and truthfulness are presented as preferable values.

== See also ==
- Helloi
- Hingchabi
- Lai Khutsangbi
- Yenakha Paotabi
