= Meitei Nganu =

Duck breed

Meitei Nganu (ꯃꯩꯇꯩ ꯉꯥꯅꯨ), also known as Eshing Nganu (ꯏꯁꯤꯡ ꯉꯥꯅꯨ), is an indigenous Manipuri duck breed from the Indian state of Manipur. It is traditionally reared by local Manipuri people and is part of the region's native animal genetic resources.

== Recognition and registration ==
The Meitei Nganu was officially registered as a distinct indigenous duck breed by the Indian Council of Agricultural Research – National Bureau of Animal Genetic Resources (ICAR-NBAGR), Karnal, Haryana. The registration was approved by the Breed Registration Committee at its 13th meeting held on 12 November 2025 in New Delhi.

The breed was one of 13 indigenous livestock and poultry breeds approved during the meeting. It was assigned the accession number INDIA_DUCK_1200_MANIPURI_11008.

== Indigenous official status ==
With its registration, Meitei Nganu became one of four indigenous animal breeds from Manipur registered with ICAR-NBAGR. The other registered breeds from the state are the Manipur pony, Manipur chicken Kaunayen, and the Manipur black pig.

== See also ==
- Nganu Leima
