= Temba Laithak =

Folk tale
- Name: Temba Laithak
- Also known as: Tembalaithak
- Aarne–Thompson grouping: no
- Mythology: Meitei mythology & Meitei folklore
- Country: India
- Region: Manipur
- Origin Date: unknown
- Published in: Meitei literature
- Related: other Meitei folktales

Tembalaithak (also rendered Temba Laithak, ꯇꯦꯝꯕ ꯂꯥꯏꯊꯛ) is a central figure in a Meitei folktale that illustrates themes of social marginality, coercion, deception, and the construction of reputation. The narrative presents Tembalaithak as an individual who, despite lacking social acceptance and economic resources, attains influence through manipulation, staged demonstrations of ability, and fortuitous circumstances.

== Characterization ==
Within the folktale, Tembalaithak is depicted as a middle-aged, unmarried man characterized by physical features and social behavior that contribute to his marginal status. He is described as short, dark-skinned, narrow-eyed, flat-nosed, rough-voiced, and notably hairy. Socially, he is portrayed as isolated and lacking familial support. His persistent and uncompromising temperament results in fear and aversion among the people around him. His attraction to Ngangbiton, the daughter of the minister Keirakpa, forms the core motivation for many of his actions.

== Marriage negotiation and coercive conduct ==
Temba's attempt to formalize a marriage with Ngangbiton begins with his request that village elders present a proposal to Keirakpa. Although the elders comply, Keirakpa refuses while maintaining social decorum. The narrative subsequently shifts to an incident in which Temba confronts Ngangbiton at a riverbank. There, he threatens her life and his own, expressing a belief that killing both would ensure union in a future life. This action is framed in the folktale as a coercive attempt to secure emotional or moral leverage. Ngangbiton's plea for safety results in Temba releasing her after extracting a promise.

== Simulated death and social consequences ==
Later, Temba enters Keirakpa's household and stages his own death in Ngangbiton's room. The discovery of his apparently lifeless body prompts Keirakpa to order his burial. Temba escapes before burial is completed, leading Keirakpa to direct blame toward Ngangbiton. As a response to social pressure and shame, Ngangbiton relocates to Temba's residence, an action portrayed in the narrative as voluntary acquiescence. Keirakpa, assuming her death, symbolically destroys his earthen cooking vessels.

== Economic condition and occupational shift ==
The folktale emphasizes the poverty of Temba and Ngangbiton following their union. Faced with deteriorating circumstances, Temba resolves to adopt the role of a fortune-teller. This occupational transformation marks a turning point in the narrative, demonstrating how strategic deception becomes a means of social and economic elevation.

== Demonstrated trickery and reputation formation ==
Temba gains initial recognition by placing ten murrel fish in a pond and presenting their retrieval as a demonstration of supernatural ability. Observers interpret this act as evidence of psychic or prophetic power, leading to the rapid spread of his reputation. His new status allows him to further manipulate social situations, including orchestrating the recovery of items he had previously stolen from Keirakpa. This act reinforces his perceived divinity or prophetic ability among the local population.

== Interactions with neighboring authorities ==
As Temba's reputation expands, he is approached by servants of a neighboring king seeking assistance in locating a stolen boat. Initially fearing exposure, Temba discovers through interrogation that the servants themselves hid the boat. Using this information, he successfully identifies the location, leading to its recovery and resulting in substantial rewards from the king. This episode demonstrates how Temba's manipulation of social cues and human fear functions as a tool for achieving authority and material gain.

== Drought crisis and attribution of rainfall ==
A subsequent episode involves a king from another kingdom requesting Temba's intervention during a drought. Temba performs ritual activities despite anticipating failure. Upon hearing a frog's croak, he anticipates coming rainfall and frames his ritual as directed toward frogs, described in the tale as symbols or agents associated with rain. After three days without rainfall, a sudden climatic shift results in heavy rain, which the king and populace interpret as confirmation of Temba's efficacy. He is rewarded again with valuable gifts.

== Interpretation ==
The folktale ends with the assertion that Tembalaithak achieved enduring success and lived peacefully with Ngangbiton. The tale is read as a commentary on how fear, strategic deception, public perception, and coincidence can construct social authority. Temba's rise from social marginality to elevated status illustrates mechanisms of reputation-building within oral narrative tradition of the Meitei people in ancient Kangleipak (early Manipur).

== See also ==
- List of Meitei folktales
