= Kei Onba water =

Kei Onba Water, also known as Kei Onba Kom Gi Eshing (ꯀꯩ ꯑꯣꯟꯕ ꯀꯣꯝ ꯒꯤ ꯏꯁꯤꯡ), or Water That Turns Everyone Into a Tiger, or Kei Oiba Gi Ishing (ꯀꯩ ꯑꯣꯏꯕꯒꯤ ꯏꯁꯤꯡ), or Keioibi Pat (ꯀꯩꯑꯣꯏꯕꯤ ꯄꯥꯠ), or Keioibi Lake, is a folktale from the Meitei community of ancient Kangleipak (early Manipur). The narrative recounts the consequences faced by a woman who consumed water from a forbidden place, resulting in her transformation into a tiger. The water body is described either as a pond or a lake or a stream in different variations of the story.

== Background ==
The story is set in a small village situated over the mountains. A married couple lived in the village with their children. The couple cultivated a large area of forestland over the mountain, converting it into agricultural fields and sustaining themselves through crop production.

== Forbidden water pit ==
During a period of agricultural work, the wife experienced severe thirst. Unable to find water in the surrounding area, she requested permission from her husband to search for water. He cautioned her against going alone, warning that a pit located nearby contained water that could transform anyone who drank from it into a tiger.

Despite this warning, the wife proceeded in search of water, initially resisting the temptation of the forbidden pit. Ultimately, overcome by thirst, she consumed the water from the pit. She did not disclose this action to her husband upon returning.

== Transformation and consequences ==
Following her consumption of the water, the woman exhibited increasingly abnormal behavior, reflecting characteristics of a tiger. Upon observing these changes, her husband realized that she had drunk from the forbidden pit. The woman confessed her actions and sought forgiveness. Despite this, the effects of the water persisted.

The woman thereafter maintained a dual existence: during the day, she retained her human form and performed her household duties; at night, she transformed into a tiger and hunted in the forest. This routine continued for a period, motivated by her concern for her family.

== Community response ==
Over time, the villagers discovered evidence of human predation linked to the woman's nocturnal activities, resulting in fear and suspicion. Observing the progressive intensification of her tiger-like behavior, the villagers decided to expel her from the community.

The woman subsequently took permanent residence in the forest as a tiger. Despite her transformation, she occasionally returned near her family's home, leading the villagers to reinforce boundaries and prevent access to the forbidden water pit. The pit was covered, surrounded by a fence, and designated as off-limits to all members of the community.

== Moral and cultural significance ==
The folktale serves as a cautionary narrative emphasizing the consequences of disobeying prohibitions. The story illustrates the transformation of the woman as a direct result of disregarding warnings and illustrates the broader theme of human vulnerability to forbidden actions.

== See also ==
- Temba Laithak
- Ngangbiton
- Thabaton
- Kumcha Lempi
- Khoirentak tiger
