= Sentreng Apanpa =

Ancient ruler of pre-historic Kangleipak

Sentreng
- King of Ancient Kangleipak
- Spouse: Sandrembi
- Issue: Mechi Sana
Era name and dates
- Haya Chak era of Ancient Kangleipak: Unknown
Regnal name
- Sentreng Apanpa, Sentreng Pakhangba
- Dynasty: Ancient Kangleipak
- Father: Korou Nongdren Pakhangba
- Mother: Thadon Leima Lairembi
- Religion: Sanamahism

Sentreng Apanpa was a semi-legendary king in the pre-historical Ancient Kangleipak history. He is mentioned in many folklore, especially the Sandrembi and Chaisra story, in which he was the husband of Sandrembi.

== Family and Kingship ==
Sentreng Apanpa was the youngest son of Korou Nongdren Pakhangba, and Thadon Leima Lairembi. Sentreng's elder brother was Kuptreng. Alternately, Korou Nongdren Pakhangba taught Sentreng the art of leadership, and Kuptreng the art of administration. Therefore, Sentreng became the king of Kangleipung (Manipur), while Kuptreng became the administrator.

== The Laibungthou System ==
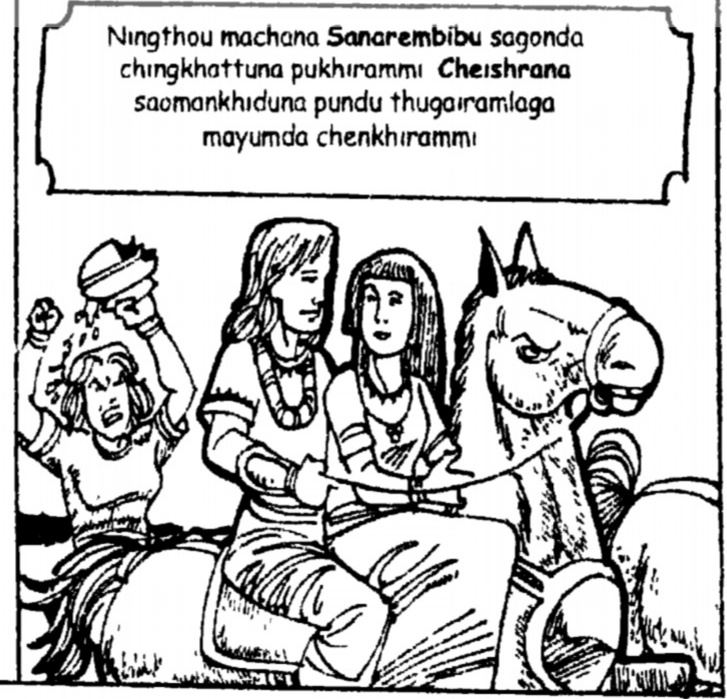
Sandrembi and Sentreng on their way to the palace.

King Sentreng Apanpa's royal court was structured according to a special form of government called the Lai-Bung-Thou, or "Heads of the Phamthous". Pham refers to a post or position while Thou can mean duty, labour, or the act of directing and guiding. In modern terms, "Lai-Bung-Thou" means "Head of Department".

There were nine Laibungthous in total, each regarded as the "God of Phamthous". There were five Phamthous under each Lai-Bung-Thous, creating a total position of sixty-one positions which included the seven kings of the seven clans, represented in the royal court. To ensure that their position and function were immediately identifiable during assemblies and state functions, each Lai-Pung-Thou was given a particular colour and ceremonial attire. The nine designations were: 1) Ingouba – White; 2) Khemaanba – Light Black; 3) Sangboren – Mossy Green; 3) Ngaangbaren – Bright Red; 4) Waobaren – Ashy White; 5) Leingaanglen – Light Red; 6) Senmaren – Metallic Bright; 7) Memaren – Bright Brown; 9) Ashanba – Variegated Colours.

== Sandrembi-Chaisra folklore ==
Sandrembi (or Sanaa Rembi) was the Queen of Sentreng Apanpa. Sentreng Apanpa ruled in the Haya Chak era. Khulen Ngamba, one of the king's nobleman had two wives. The elder wife had a daughter named Sandrembi, while the younger wife had a daughter named Chaisra. Later, the nobleman died and the two wives were left as widows. The elder widow was killed by the younger widow after dropping snakes to the former's mouth, telling her that they were much delicious ones of the fruits they were eating. After the elder widow died, Sandrembi was mistreated by the younger widow and Chaisra.

Later on, they grew up. Sandrembi became beautiful although she was not properly dressed up, while Chaisra became ugly even though she properly dressed up. One day, King Sentreng Apanpa came for hunting and saw the two maidens fetching water by the riverside. Knowing the quality of Sandrembi's beauty, the king decided to take her to the palace and make her the Queen. Later, they lived happily and got a son called Mechi Sana (Machi Sana Melei Khomba in the story).

Her stepmother and Chaisra were jealous of her luck. So, the two decided to kill her by inviting her for dinner. Sandrembi came to her parental house with the permission of Sentreng Apanpa. After the dinner, Chaisra dropped Sandrembi's dresses under the bed. When Sandrembi went under the bed to bring the clothes out, her stepmother poured the hottest water over Sandrembi's body. Sandrembi died and got transformed into a pigeon and flew away. Chaisra disguised as Sandrembi and went to the royal palace. The king suspected her because she did not look like Sandrembi who was beautiful as a lily.

=== Revival ===
Later in the story, Sandrembi was revived from a fruit. There was a quarrel between Sandrembi and Chaisra. Eventually, the king decided to settle the matter through a duel. Chaisra, the defendant, was permitted to fight with a bright, sharp sword, while Sandrembi, the plaintiff, had to use a wooden knife, since she bore the burden of proving her innocence. It was believed that if Sandrembi truly deserved justice, she would win despite wielding only a rusty sword. Chaisra doubted the validity of the trial by ordeal and hoped to defeat her opponent with a single strike. Her request for the shiny sword was justified. Sandrembi trusted in her innocence and declared, "If I am innocent, may Chaisra’s sword become harmless to me". During the fight, as Chaisra attacked with her sharp sword, Sandrembi remained unharmed. Suddenly, the blunt sword miraculously slipped from Sandrembi’s hand and struck Chaisra’s neck, chopping it off.

== Gallery ==
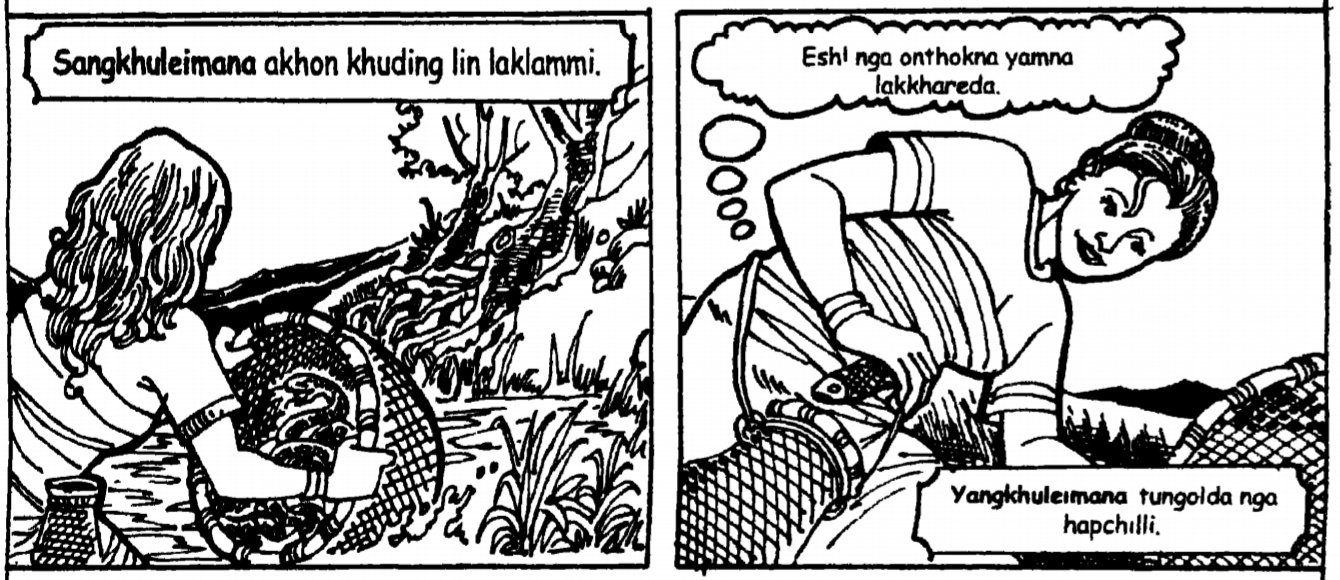

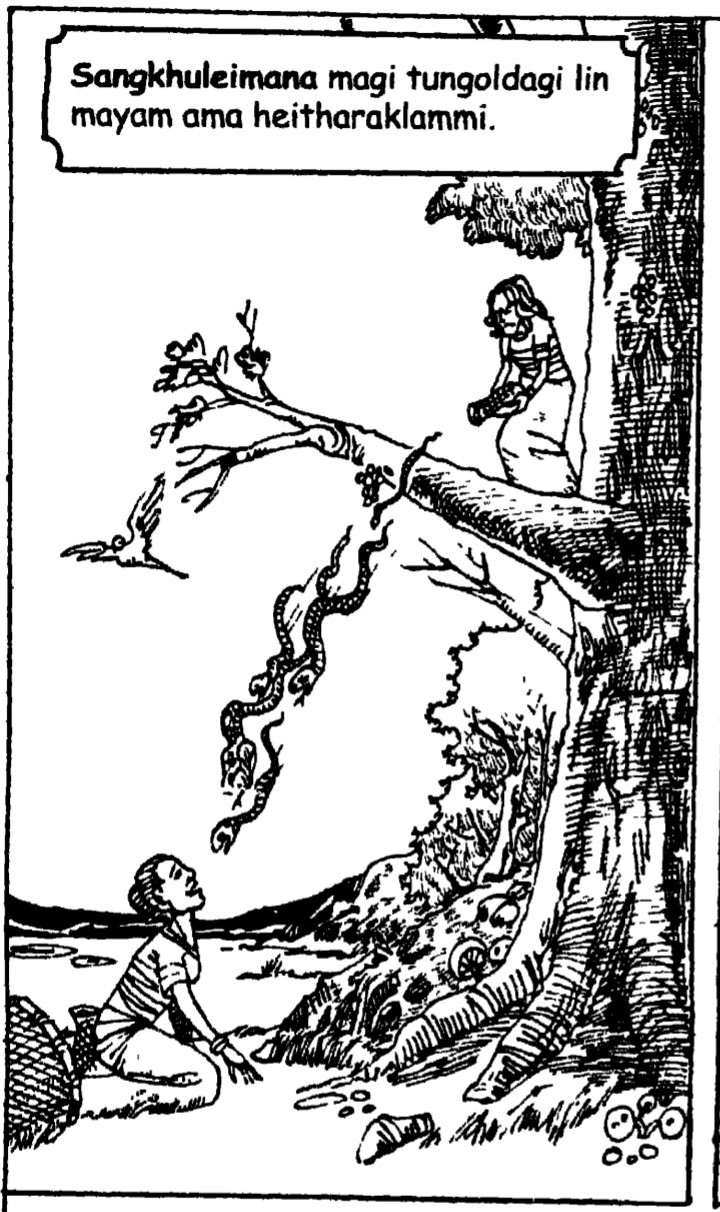

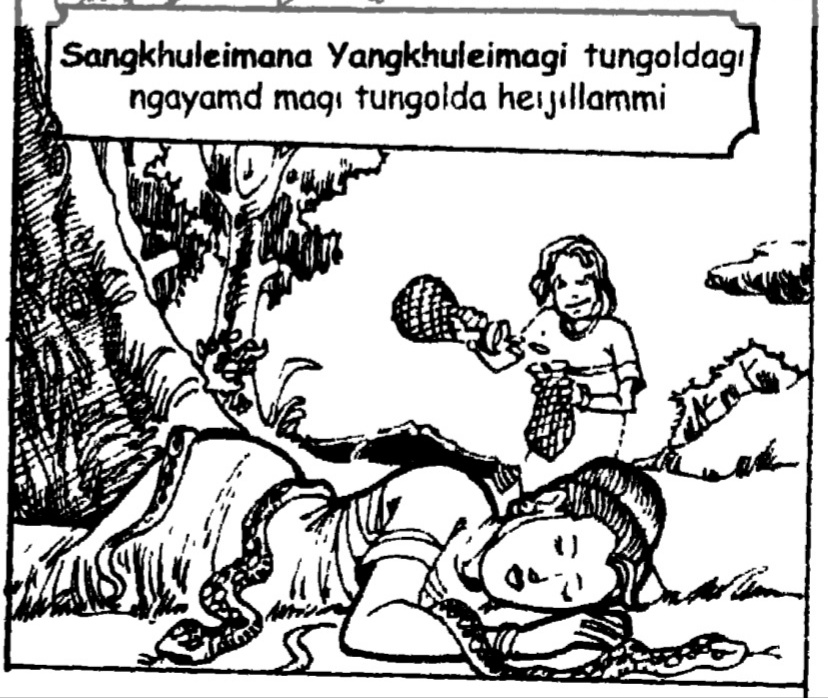

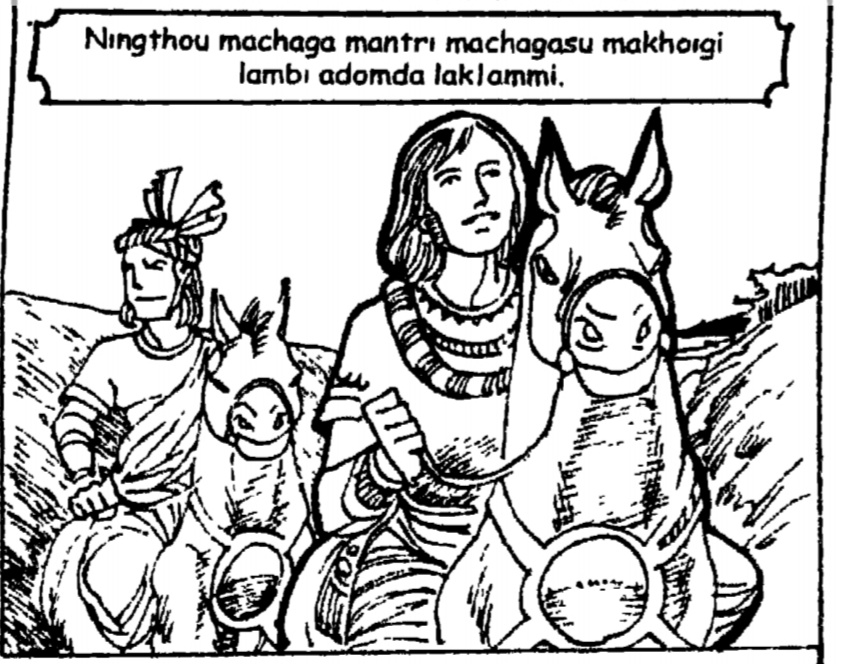

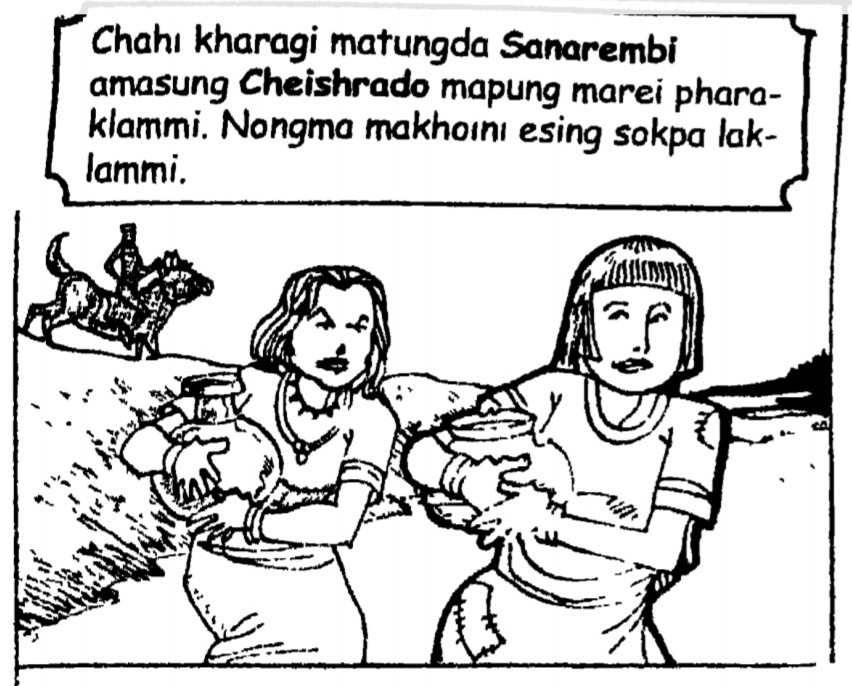

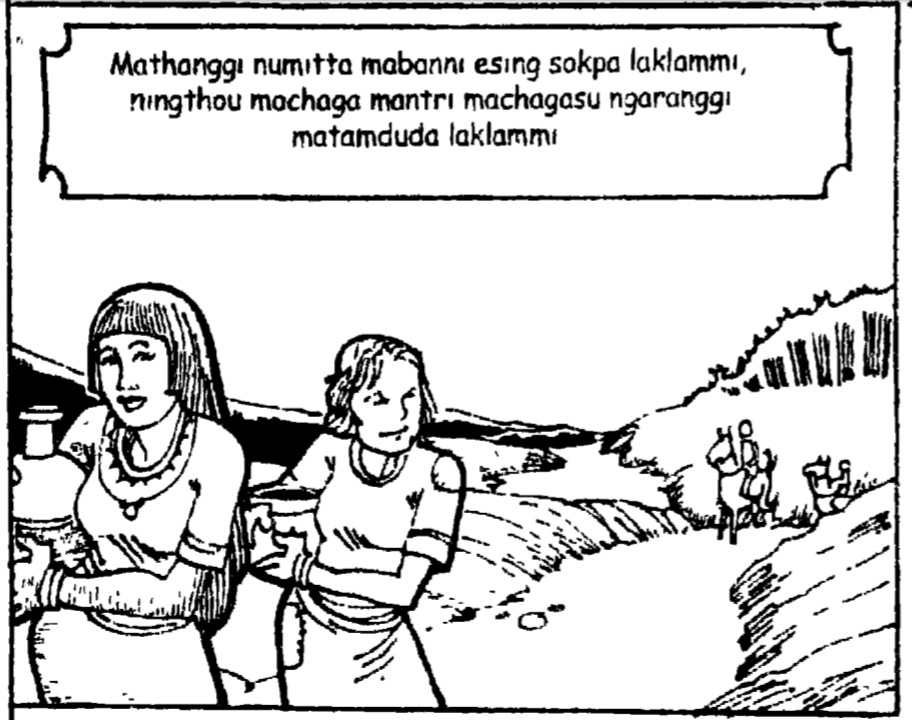

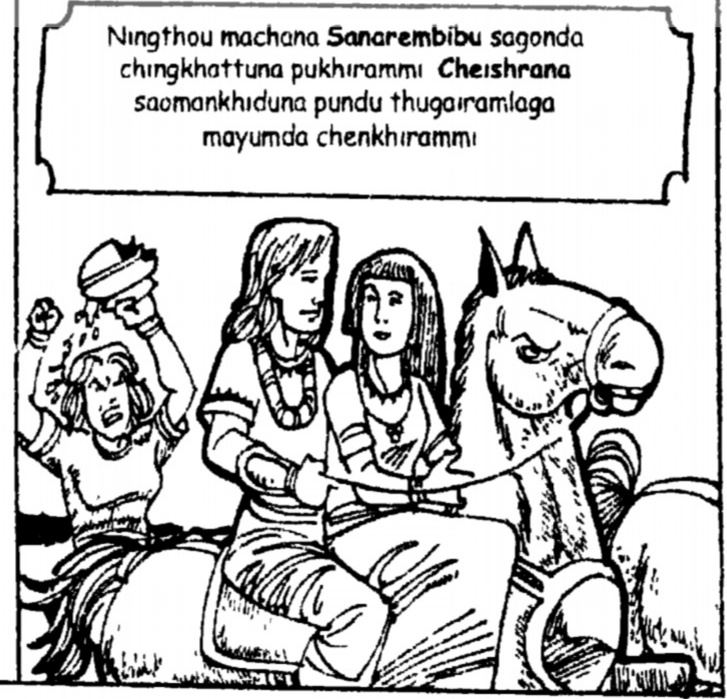

== Related pages ==
- Sandrembi and Chaisra
- Ancient Kangleipak
