= Shapi Leima =

Goddess of rodents in Meitei mythology

- Goddess of rodents
- Member of Lairembis
- Other names: Sapi Leima; Shabi Leima; Shabireima; Sabi Leima; Sabireima
- Affiliation: Meitei mythology (Manipuri mythology) and Meitei religion (Sanamahism)
- Animals: rodents
- Symbols: rodents
- Gender: Female
- Region: Manipur, Northeast India
- Ethnic group: Meitei ethnicity
- Festivals: Lai Haraoba

Genealogy
- Parents: Salailen (Soraren)
- Siblings: Khunu Leima and Nganu Leima

Shapi Leima (Shabi Leima) or Sapi Leima (Sabi Leima) is the goddess of rodents in Meitei mythology and religion. She is a sister of goddesses Khunu Leima and Nganu Leima. Legend says that all three sisters married the same mortal man.

== Description ==
Shapi Leima (Shabi Leima) is described as the mistress of all the rodents of the world. At any time, she could summon all the rodents at any place she wishes. She is the youngest daughter of the god Salailen (alias Soraren).

== See also ==
- Ireima (Ereima), Meitei goddess of water
- Leimarel (Leimalel), Meitei goddess of earth
- Ngaleima, Meitei goddess of fish
- Phouoibi (Phouleima), Meitei goddess of agricultural crops
- Thumleima, Meitei goddess of salt

== Bibliography ==
- Glimpses of Manipuri Culture - Dr. Yumlembam Gopi Devi
- The History of Manipur: An early period - Wahengbam Ibohal Singh · 1986
