= Ngangbiton =

Folktale character

Ngangbiton (ꯉꯥꯡꯕꯤꯇꯣꯟ / ꯉꯥꯪꯕꯤꯇꯣꯟ) is a character in a Meitei folktale that features Tembalaithak (also known as Temba Laithak). She is described as the daughter of Keirakpa, a minister in her community. Ngangbiton plays an important role in the story, which follows events surrounding her unwanted attention from Temba, her father's reaction, and the difficult life that follows.

== Background ==
Ngangbiton is presented as a young woman known for her beauty. She is the daughter of Keirakpa, who holds the position of minister in the area. Her social position becomes significant because Tembalaithak believes he is too inferior to be accepted as her husband.

== Incident at the river ==
In the folktale, Ngangbiton goes to the river with her friends to bathe, even though she usually does not bathe there. At the river, she is confronted by Temba, who grabs her hand and threatens to kill both her and himself. Frightened, she asks him to spare her life. Temba releases her only after she makes a promise to him.

== Aftermath of the incident ==
Later, when Temba pretends to be dead inside Keirakpa's house, Keirakpa blames Ngangbiton for the situation. He scolds her harshly and becomes angry after learning that Temba has escaped. Feeling ashamed because of her father's reaction, Ngangbiton leaves her home and goes to Temba's house, where she is welcomed.

Keirakpa, believing that his daughter has died, breaks his earthen cooking pots as a sign of sorrow.

== Life with Temba ==
Ngangbiton and Temba live together in poverty. Their financial situation becomes worse over time. Ngangbiton remains with Temba throughout the events of the folktale, including his rise to fame through deception, fortune-telling, and assistance given to different kings.

== Role in the folktale ==
Ngangbiton's role in the story is closely linked to the actions and decisions of Tembalaithak. Her experiences reflect themes of fear, social pressure, family conflict, and the difficult position of women within the narrative. The folktale ends by stating that Ngangbiton lives peacefully with Temba for the rest of her life.

== See also ==
- Women in Meitei culture
- List of Meitei folktales
- Thambalnu
- Thabaton
- Yaithing Konu
- Pidonnu
- Khamnu
- Hayainu
- Haosi Namoinu
