= Khunu Leima =

Meitei goddess of pigeonsand doves

- Goddess of pigeons and doves
- Member of Lairembis
- Other names: Khunuleima; Khunureima
- Affiliation: Meitei mythology (Manipuri mythology) and Meitei religion (Sanamahism)
- Animals: pigeons and doves
- Symbols: pigeons and doves
- Gender: Female
- Region: Manipur, Northeast India
- Ethnic group: Meitei ethnicity
- Festivals: Lai Haraoba

Genealogy
- Parents: Salailen
- Siblings: Nganu Leima and Shapi Leima

Khunu Leima (Meitei: ꯈꯨꯅꯨꯔꯩꯃ, lit. 'pigeon lady') or Khunureima is the goddess of pigeons and doves in Sanamahism' the indigenous religion of Manipur. She is a sister of goddesses Nganu Leima and Shapi Leima. Legend says that all three sisters married the same mortal man.

== Description ==
Khunu Leima is the ruler of all pigeons. At any time, she could summon all pigeons to any place she wishes. She is one of the daughters of the sky god Salailen.

== See also ==
- Ngaleima, Meitei goddess of fish
