= Hingchabi =

Mythical creature in Sanamahism

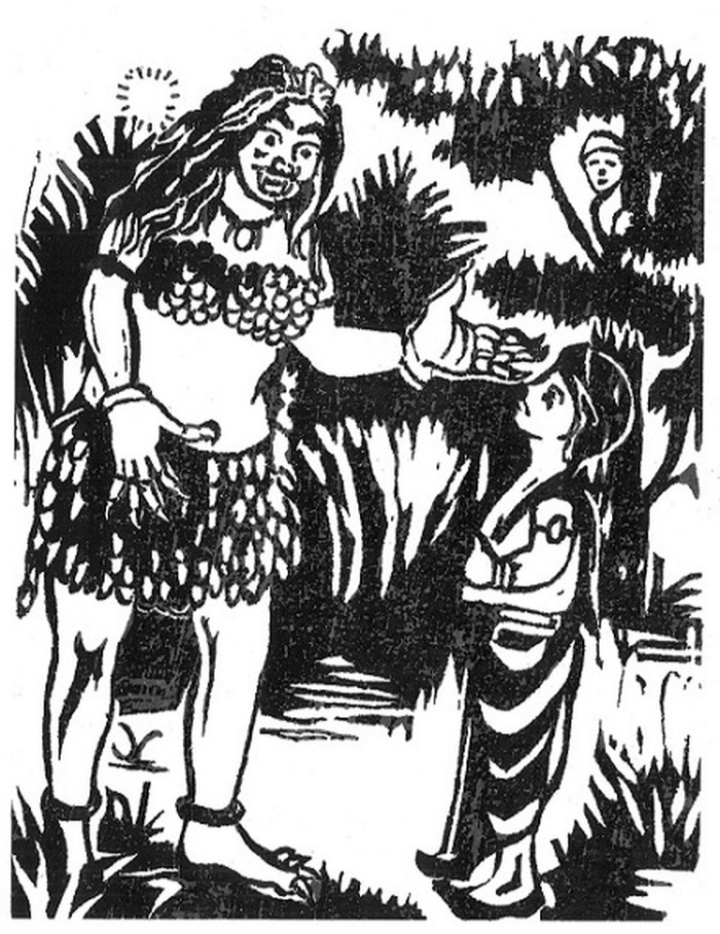
- A typical hingchabi of Meitei Manipuri folklore

Creature information
- Other name(s): Hingchapi, Sha hingchabi, Saa hingchabi
- Grouping: Mythology
- Sub grouping: Meitei mythology (Manipuri mythology)
- Similar entities: Helloi, Lam Lai, Umang Lai, Keibu Keioiba
- Family: demoness
- Folklore: Meitei folklore (Manipuri folklore)

Origin
- Country: India
- Region: Manipur

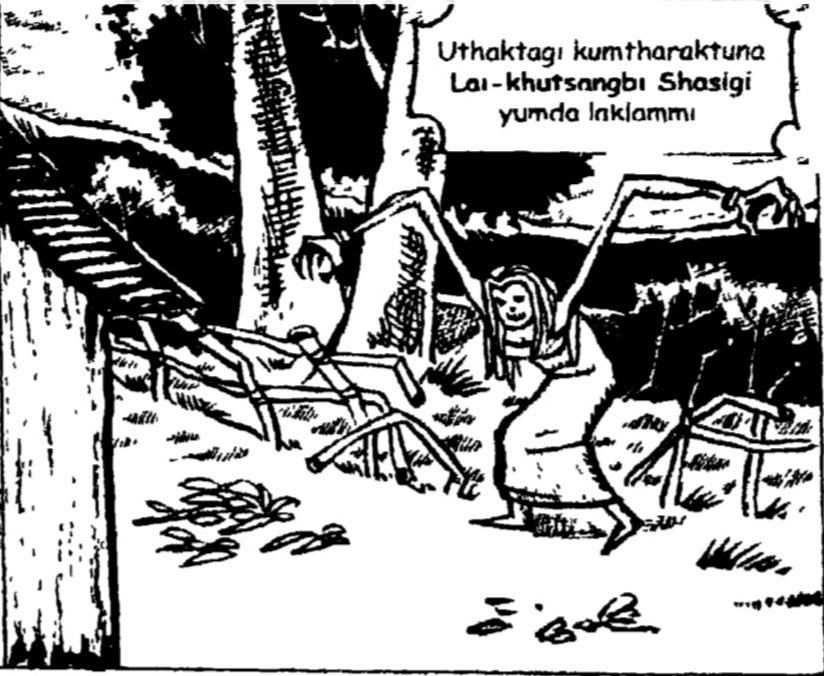
Lai Khutshangbi, a popular Hingchabi.

A Hingchabi (Meitei: ꯍꯤꯡꯆꯥꯕꯤ, Old Manipuri: ꯍꯤꯡꯆꯥꯄꯤ, romanized: hing-chaa-pee, lit. 'giantess') is a mythical creature in Meitei mythology, folklore and religion (Sanamahism) of Antique Kangleipak (Ancient Manipur). She has characters similar to those of the vampires as well as the witches. The terms, "hing" means "raw" and "chaa" means "to eat" in Meitei language (Manipuri language).

== Sources ==
- Chaudhury, Sukant Kumar (2006). Culture, Ecology, and Sustainable Development. Mittal Publications. p. 145. ISBN 978-81-8324-132-8.
- South Asian Anthropologist. Sarat Chandra Roy Institute of Anthropological Studies. 1994.
- Singh, Moirangthem Kirti (1998). Recent Researches in Oriental Indological Studies: Including Meiteilogy. Parimal Publications.
- The Anthropologist: International Journal of Contemporary and Applied Studies of Man. Kamla-Raj Enterprises. 2003.
