= Nganu Leima =

Meitei goddess of ducks and waterfowl

- Goddess of ducks and waterfowl
- Member of Lairembis
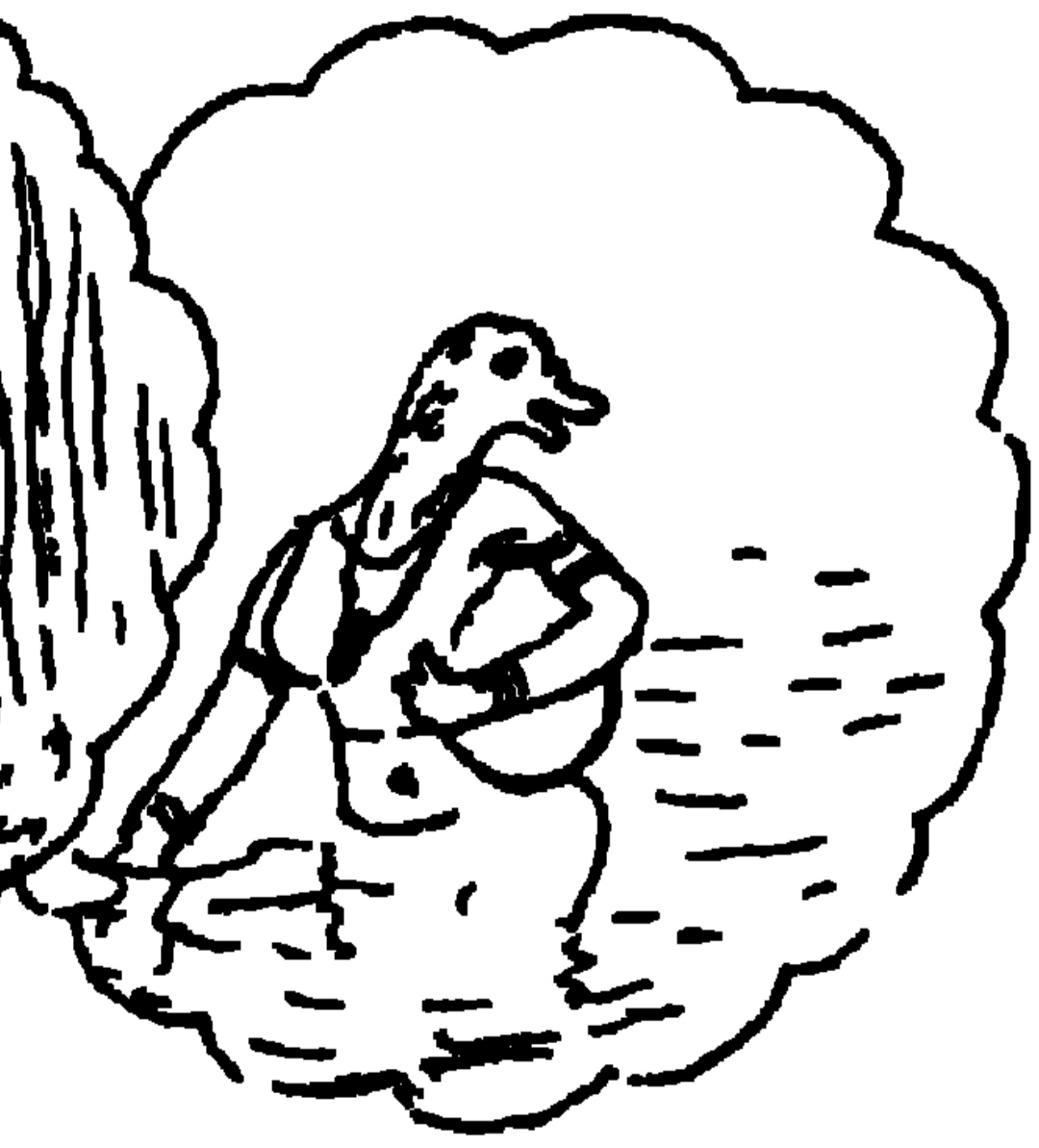
- Depiction of Nganu Leima
- Other names: Nganuleima; Nganureima
- Affiliation: Meitei mythology (Manipuri mythology) and Meitei religion (Sanamahism)
- Animals: ducks and waterfowl
- Symbols: ducks and waterfowl
- Gender: Female
- Region: Manipur, Northeast India
- Ethnic group: Meitei ethnicity
- Festivals: Lai Haraoba

Genealogy
- Parents: Salailen (Soraren)
- Siblings: Khunu Leima and Shapi Leima

Nganu Leima (Meitei: ꯉꯥꯅꯨ ꯂꯩꯃ, lit. 'duck lady') is the goddess of ducks and waterfowl in Sanamahism, the indigenous religion of Manipur. She is a sister of goddesses Khunu Leima and Shapi Leima. Legend says that all three sisters married to the same mortal man.

== Description ==
Nganu Leima is described as the mistress of all the ducks and waterfowl of the world. According to the Sanamahist religion she has the ability to summon all the ducks and waterfowl at any place she wishes. She is one of the daughters of the sky god Salailen.

== See also ==
- Ireima (Ereima), Meitei goddess of water
- Ngaleima, Meitei goddess of fish
