= Lai Khutshangbi =

Demoness in Meitei folklore

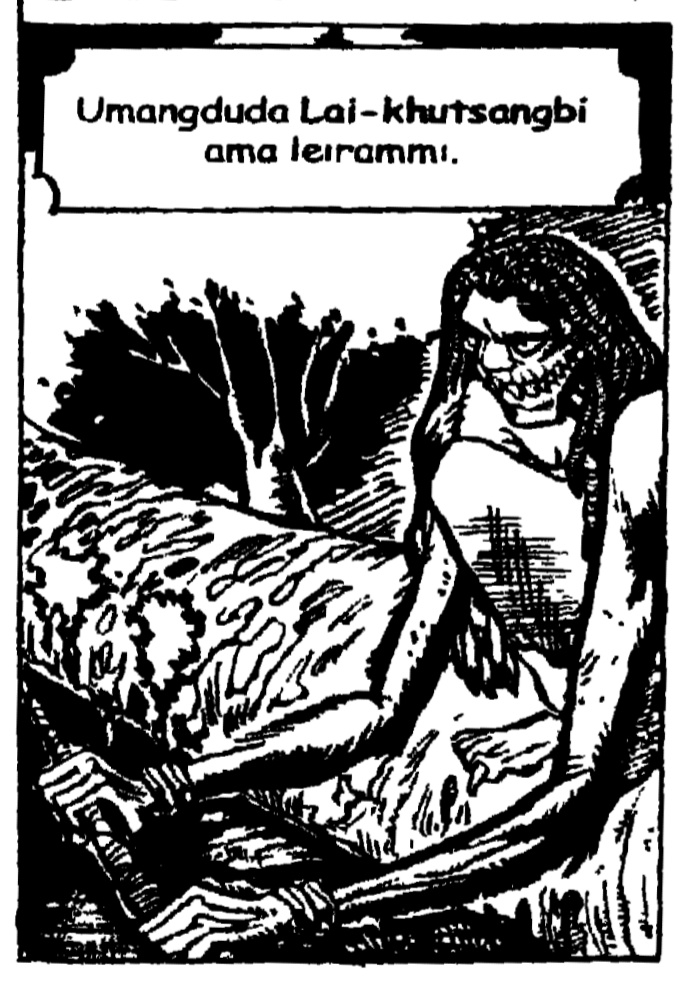
- Lai Khutshangbi, the long handed demoness.

Creature information
- Other name: Lai Khutsangbi
- Grouping: Mythology
- Sub grouping: Meitei mythology (Manipuri mythology)
- Similar entities: Yenakha Paodabi, Keibu Keioiba
- Family: Hingchabi (demoness)
- Folklore: Meitei folklore (Manipuri folklore)

Origin
- Country: Ancient Manipur (historical); India (present)
- Region: Manipur

Lai Khutshangbi (/laai-khoot-shaang-bee/) is a demoness (hingchabi) in Meitei mythology and folklore of Antique Kangleipak (Ancient Manipur). She has very long hands. The word "Lai" means "deity or divinity," "Khut" means "hand," and "Sangbi" or "Shangbi" means "long" in Manipuri (Meitei). The legend says that when she walks, her long hands touch the ground. Her fingers are as sharp as thorns. She has a large mouth with a long tongue. Her appearance is very frightening.

== Story ==
There was a man and woman with a little child named Shasi (or "Shachi" or "Leirik" or "Naocha" in other versions) living in an isolated house in a hamlet. Nearby was the forest where Lai Khutsangbi lived. She usually stole and ate livestock and human babies from the village. She took advantage of people's loneliness, sowing terror in the people in the village.

Lai Khutsangbi especially wanted to eat the child Shasi. But Shasi's father, Shasipa was so brave that the Lai Khutsangbi was afraid of him. One day, Shasipa left home to work somewhere far away. He would be gone for days. Lai Khutsangbi came to the house at night and asked Shasi's mother, Shasima if her husband was at home or not. Shasima was wise, so she lied and said her husband was at home. Lai Khutsangbi left. But she came back night after night and asked the same question again and again. Shasi's mother also gave the same reply, hiding the true fact that Shasipa was away. After some time, Shasi's father returned home and Shasi's mother told him what had happened. Hearing this, Shasi's father devised a plan to defeat the demoness. That night, he waited for Lai Khutsangbi with a sharpened sword. At midnight, the demoness, as usual, came to ask Shasima if her husband was home. This time, Shasi's mother replied that he was away from home. Unaware of the trick, Lai Khutsangbi broke through the wall of the house with one of her powerful hands, trying to find Shasi, the child. Shasi's father, who was waiting for this opportunity, chopped off the hand with his sword. Then, the demoness screamed painfully,

Ayo Ema, I am dead!
Ayo yo Ema ayo yo
Leimadeng deng Ningjaobi
You a big liar
Ayo yo Ema ayoyo

Lai Khutsangbi fled from the house, dragging her remaining long arm. The blood flew out of her cut arm and fell onto many plants growing on her way to the forest. It is said that the red patches seen on some plants is her blood. Shasi's father followed her blood trail into the woods. The demoness could not run fast as fast as she usually could because she was injured. Shasi's father caught her and stepped on her other remaining hand. Then, he chopped off that arm too. The villagers thanked Shasipa for his bravery. From that day onwards, Lai Khutsangbi, the long handed demoness, was never seen again.

== Gallery ==
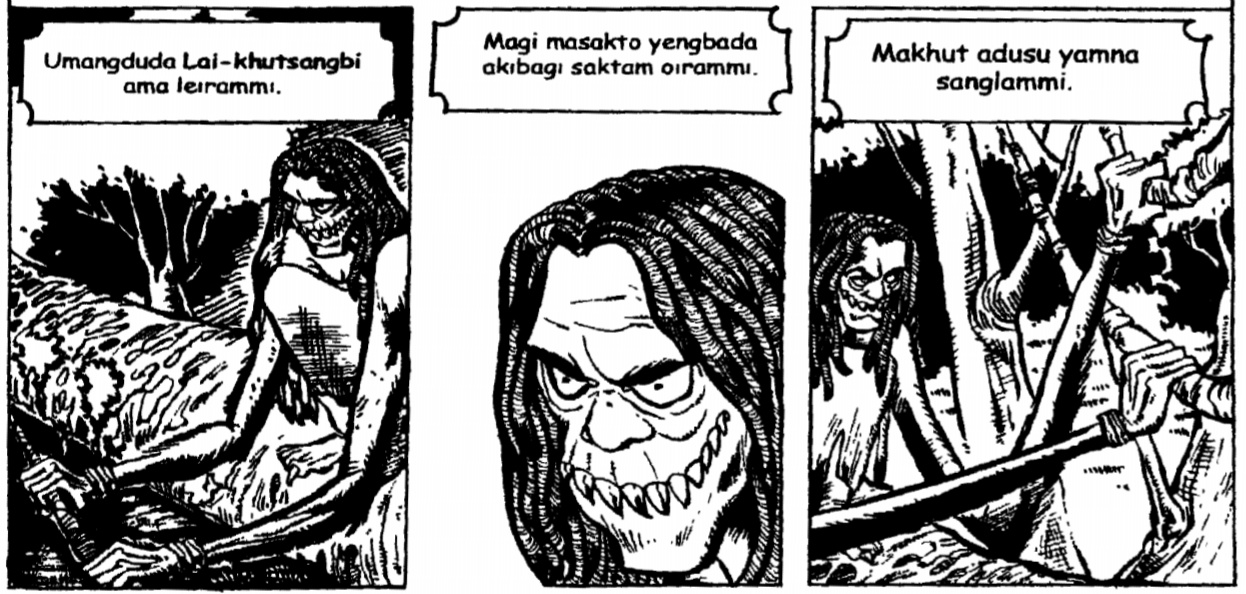
Lai Khutsangbi

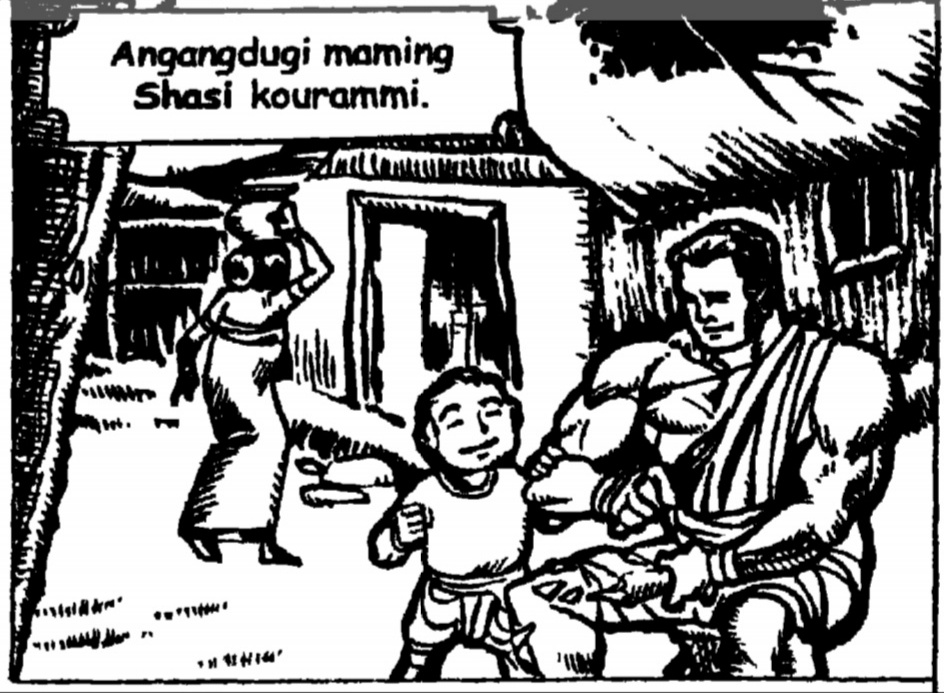
The family of Shasi, the child who is desired by Lai Khutsangbi

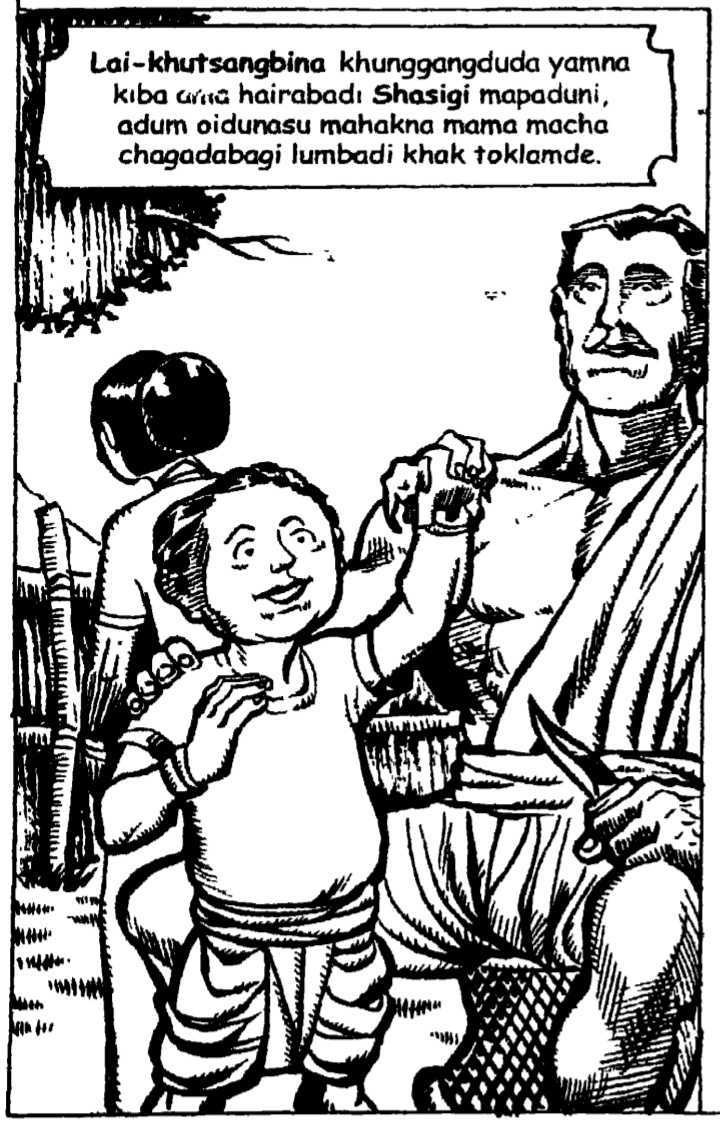
The family of Shasi, the child who is desired by Lai Khutsangbi

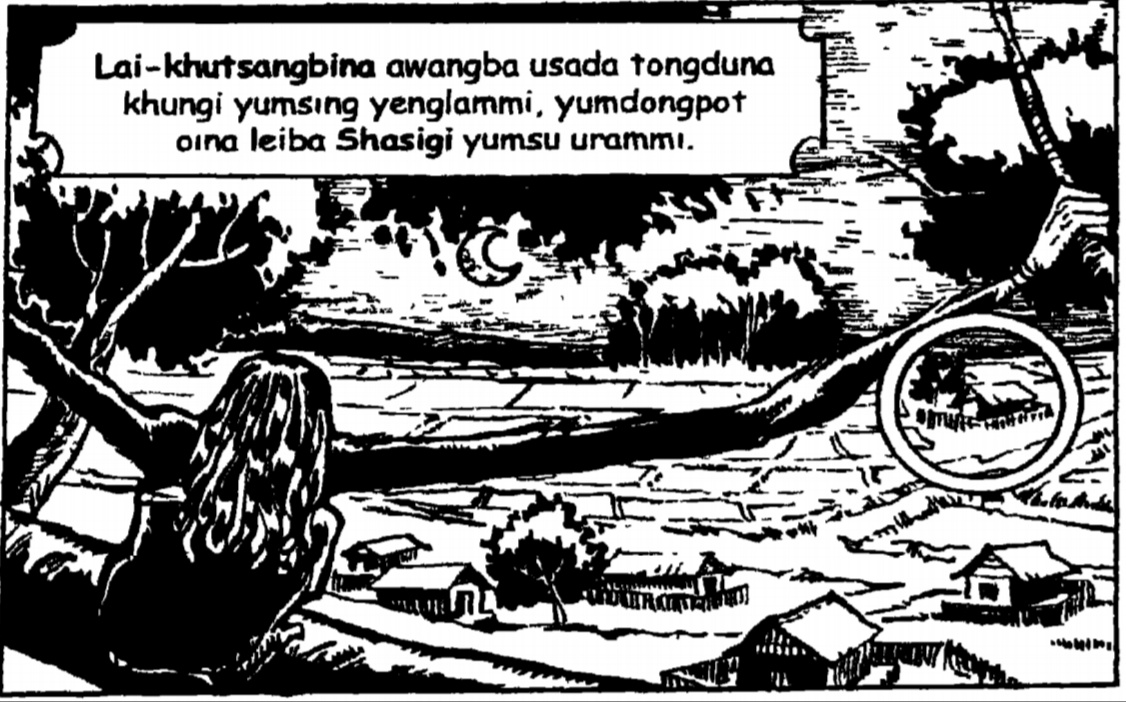
Lai Khutsangbi aiming to the lonely house

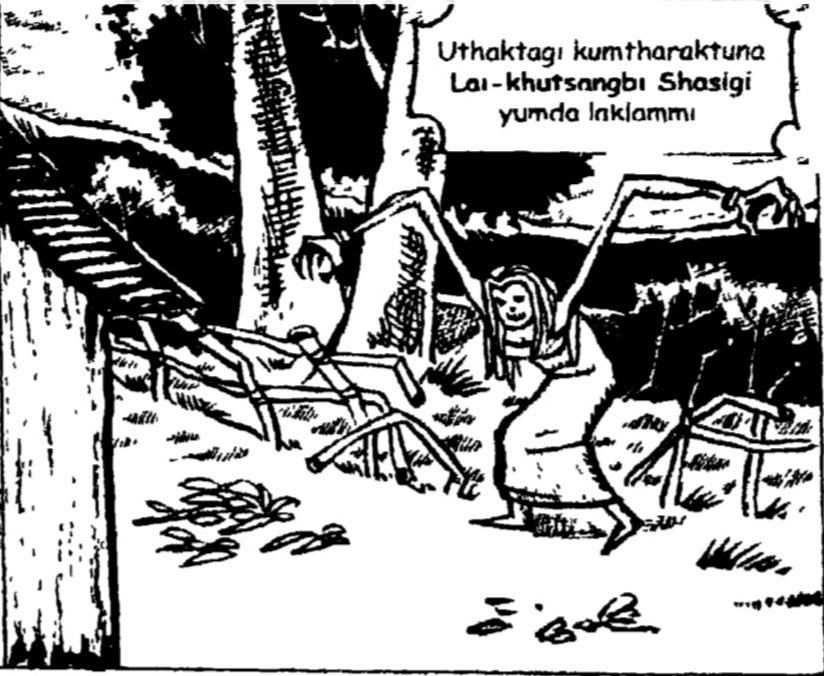
Lai Khutsangbi coming to human settlement

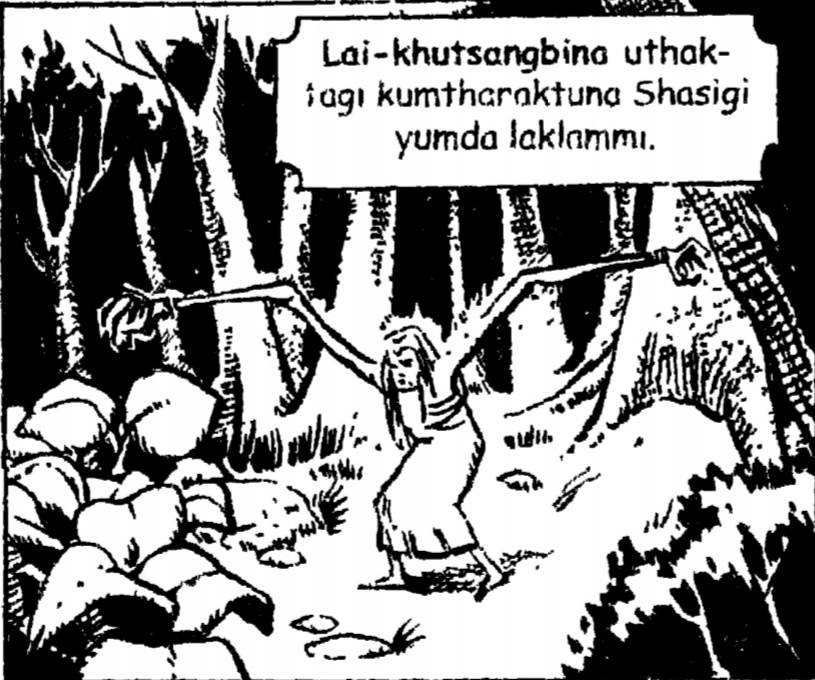
Lai Khutsangbi coming to the village

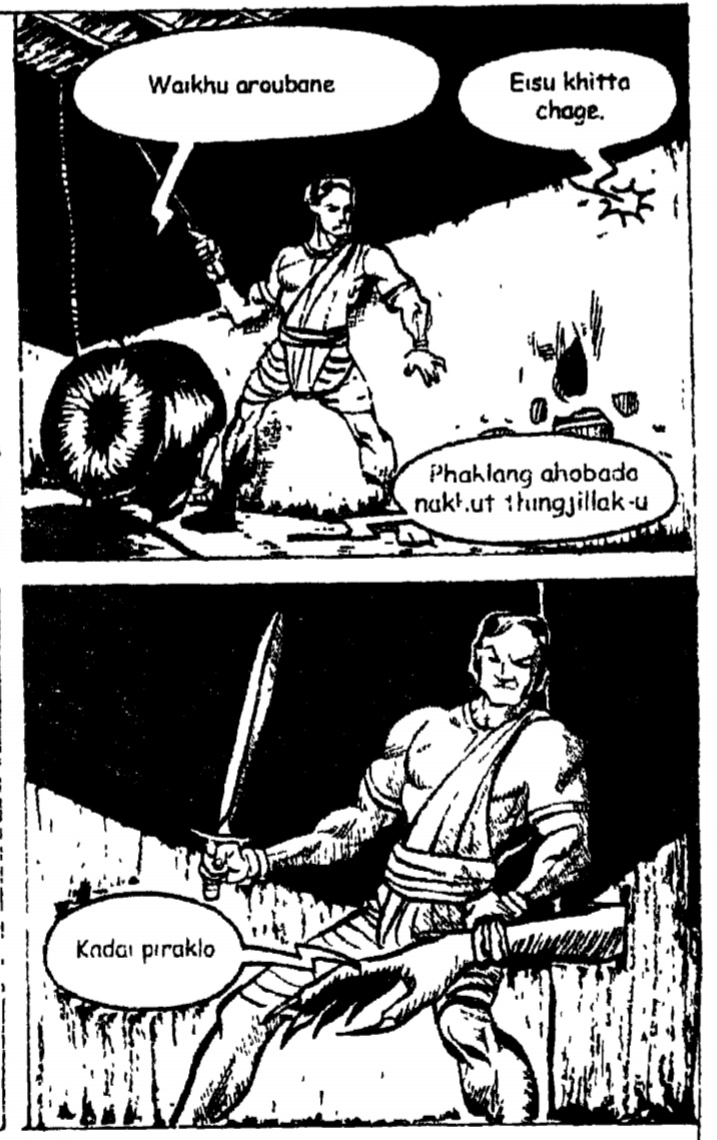
Lai Khutsangbi penetrating the wall of the house with her powerful hand

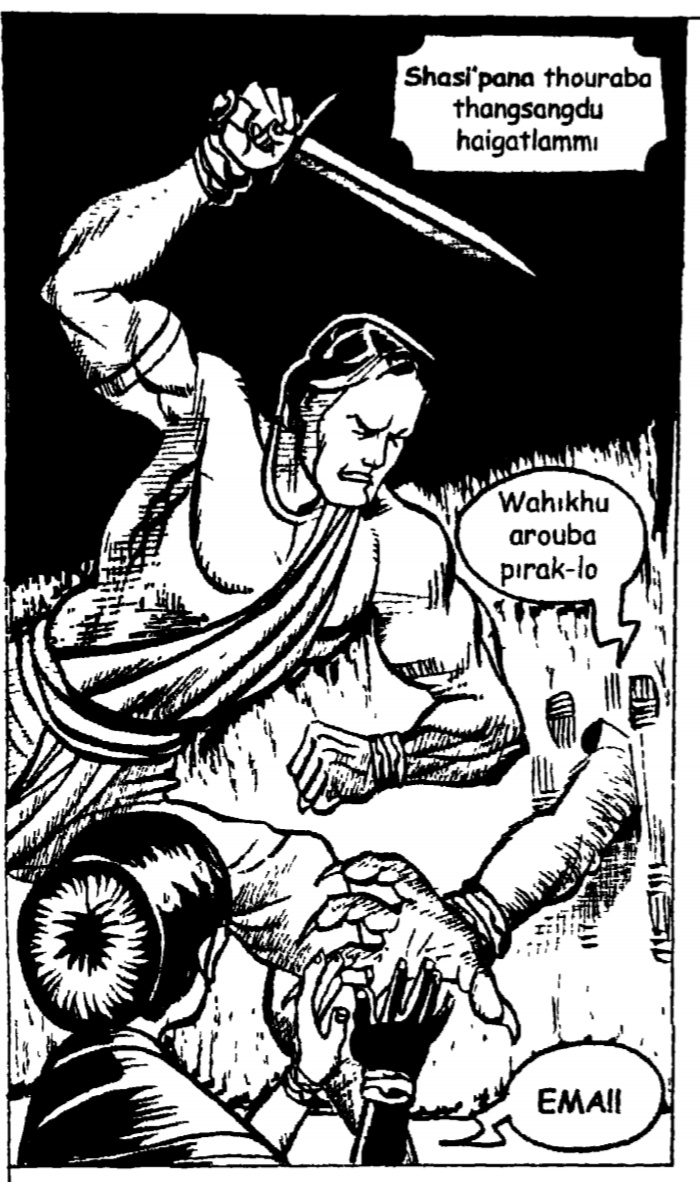
Lai Khutsangbi's hand about to chopped off by Shasipa, Shasi's father

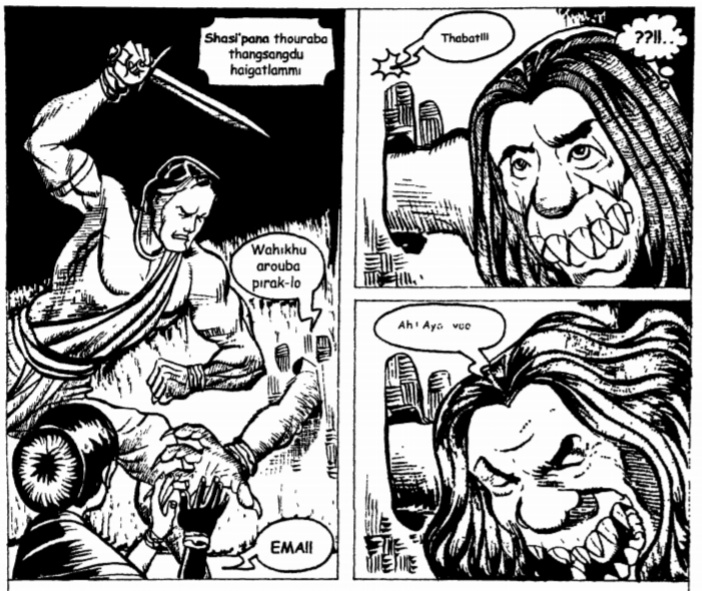
The first hand being chopped off

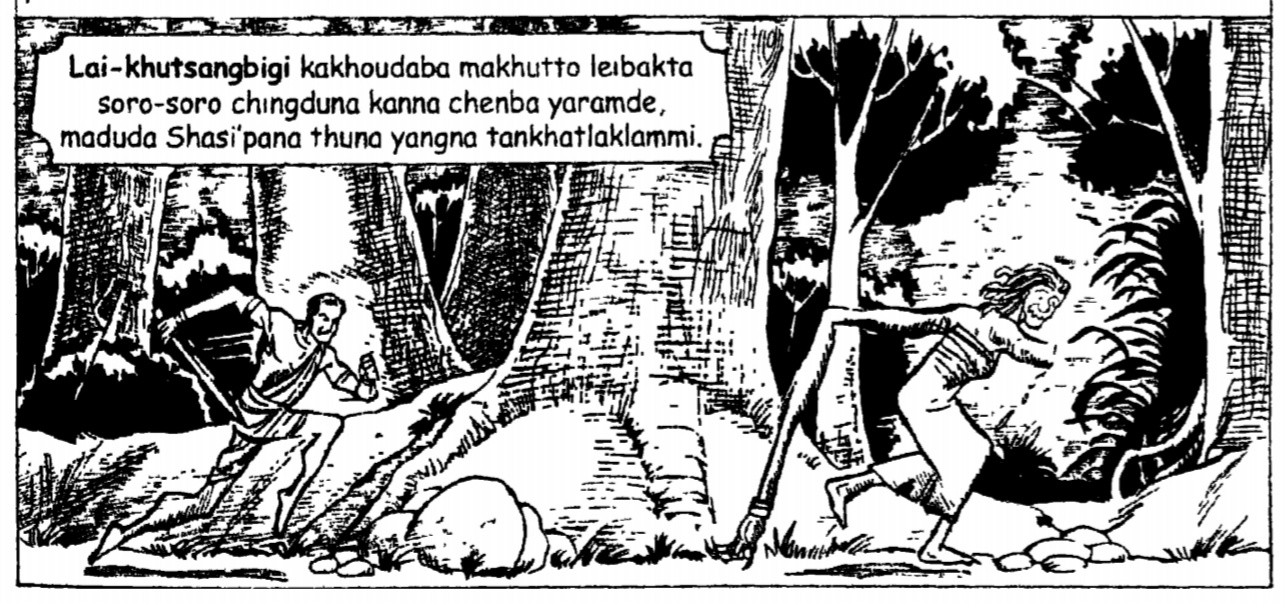
Lai Khutsangbi being followed by Shasi's father

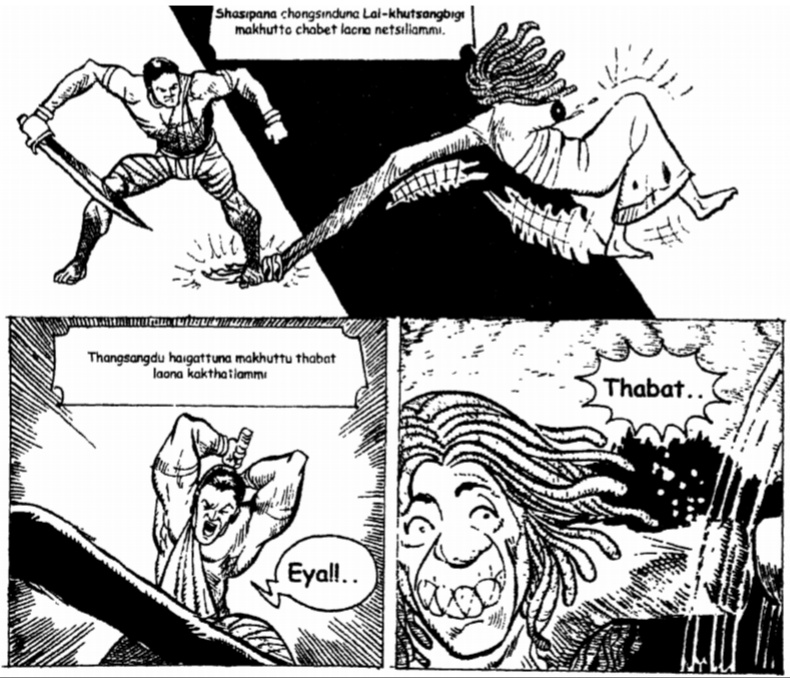
The second hand being chopped off

== Other websites ==
- The Secret of Lai Khutsangbi
- Lai Khutsangbi, female power and punishment
