= Yenakha Paotapi =

Demoness from ancient Meitei mythology

- Eavesdropping evil deity
- Member of Hingchabis and Lairembis
- A book art depicting the Evil Eavesdropper Yenakha Paotapi transfiguring herself into the form of a man's, and meeting the very man
- Other names: Yenakha Pao Tabi Saijin Polibi, Yenakha Paotabi, Yenakha Paodabi
- Affiliation: Meitei mythology (Manipuri mythology), Meitei folklore (Manipuri folklore) and Meitei religion (Sanamahism)
- Abodes: Eaves and graves
- Gender: Female
- Region: Ancient Kangleipak (early Manipur)
- Ethnic group: Meitei ethnicity

Yenakha Paotapi or Yenakha Paodabi Saijin Polibi (English: Eavesdropper), also known as the evil eavesdropper, is an old demoness (Meitei: hingchabi). Stories often show her as an evil spirit. She lingers around the eaves of roofs in Meitei mythology and folklore of Ancient Kangleipak (early Manipur). She is described as the one who interferes everywhere. Legend says that she could not live with human beings. Instead, she lives like a dog or a jackal, sitting on graves. In some cases, she is depicted as a minor goddess (Meitei: lairembi) in the Meitei religion.

== Mythology ==
There are many legends of Yenakha Paotaapi.

=== Yenakha Paotaapi and the childless couple ===
Once there was a childless couple. They would play a game together. They would make riddles. Whoever lost the riddle game would give the winner a Shareng fish (Wallago attu, helicopter catfish). The husband made a riddle like this:

"A man with four hands
With a rucksack by his side,
Is dancing round and round.
Rolling around cheerful is another man in front."

The wife could not find the answer to the riddle. Then, the husband told her the answer:

"The answer is what you do many times. You use a four spoked wheel and when you rotate it, the yarn ball rotates in the front."

Then, the wife told a new riddle to her husband:

"What is that cries when fed and stops crying when you stop feeding?"

The husband answered that it was a "kaptreng", a traditional Meitei traditional wooden tool for ginning cotton. The wife had to give her husband a fish the next day. They went to sleep that night. But Yenakha Paotabi, the old demoness, had been listening to their riddles. She thought of an evil plan to ruin the couple's life. While planning, she thought,

"I should not lose this opportunity.
Tomorrow, I will impersonate the wife when she is away.
She will be driven away by her husband. I will stay with him as his wife for few days and one day, when he is asleep, I will cut his throat and drink his blood. Oh! How tasty it will be!"

The next day, Yenakha Paodabi did everything in to her plan: She changed her appearance so she looked like the wife. When the real wife was away at the market, Yenakha Paodabi entered the house holding a Shareng fish, when the actual woman was away to market. The husband had no doubt about the woman until his real wife returned home. He was filled with surprise to see two women who looked exactly like his wife. There was a huge quarrel and then a fight between the two identical women. The husband was unable to solve the problem. So, all of them went to the King to judge their matter. After hearing the whole story, the king said to the two women,

"As both of you are firm on your stands, let the great God show us the truth."

Then, as per a new plan devised by the King, a priest (maiba) got blessings from the Lainingthou (Great God) and put a hollow bamboo pipe on a banana leaf. Then, the king told the two women that only the real woman would be able to pass through the narrow bamboo pipe. The king and asked the two to try to go through the pipe to prove their real identity. But this was a trick. The demoness, not realizing, immediately transformed. She shrunk until she could fit into the hollow bamboo pipe. Then, the king immediately made his men close both the ends of the bamboo pipe. Thus, Yenakha Paodabi, was trapped. He tried to burn the bamboo pipe, but Yenakha Paodabi requested that he let her go. The king released her. From that day onwards, Yenakha Paodabi never interfered again with the couple's life.

=== Machil Moupwa (the brother and the sister) ===
Once there lived a widowed lady with her three children. Since her husband's death, the woman went to market and sell vegetables to feed her children. The eldest child was a girl. The girl was little grown up. So, she helped her mother in household works. The two younger children were boys. The youngest one still fed on mother's milk. One day, the mother did not return home from the market. The boys started crying. Their sister tried to console them but she failed to do so. Meanwhile, Yenakha Paotabi heard the cry. She was very happy at this. She planned to eat up all the children that very day. It had been a very long time she had not eaten any human child. So, she hid herself at that house's eaves.

While she was away from the house, the mother eloped with a man. Taking advantage of this situation, Yenakha Paotabi transfigured herself to look like the mother. She pretended to be returning from the market. She took the youngest child from the sister's hand. She held the little boy in her arms. She ate him by breaking into pieces. The elder brother asked her what she was eating. Yenakha Paotabi replied that it was not something he could eat. She said it was Thambou (Lotus stem) brought from the market. The sister discovered that the strange woman was not their mother but a witch. So, she thought of running away with her survived younger brother to save their lives. The brother and the sister ran away from the place. Yenakha Paotabi finished eating the small boy. Then, she looked for the rest of the children. She found them missing. So she started following the children. The brother and the sister hid themselves at the neighbouring house ("a house at far away place found after running" in another version of the story).

Later, the two siblings found their real mother. They ran towards her joyfully calling "mother". But the mother denied them as her children. Her newly married husband fell suspicious of her as the children called her "Mother". It was because she lied to him that she did not have any child. So, he asked her if she was hiding something from him. The mother brought a Shuk (stick of rice grinder). She said that the child who can throw this Shuk in front of the front yard of the house was her true child. According to her, the one who could not do it was not her true child. The daughter (sister) mentioned God Lainingthou's name. She closed her eyes filled with tears. She threw the Shuk. The Shuk fell ahead of the front yard. The younger brother failed to do so. It was because he was not strong. According to the mother's words, the sister was accepted but the little boy was rejected. The sister cried at her mother's rejection of her younger brother. The sister took out some food to feed her little brother. Her mother scolded at her. After that, the sister gave her younger brother only paddy grains to cook. The younger brother brought the grains to cook it somewhere. Accidentally, he slipped on a Lukrak (Culm sheath of bamboo tree) and all the grains fell off. When he was picking up the grains, a bird known as Waba Chengjaba ate up the grains. The younger brother cried and narrated the mishaps to his sister. She gave him some more grains. Taking the grains, he came back joyfully. However, he met the same mishaps again. All his grains were eaten up by the bird. He got angry. At the same time, he was also scared of his sister to tell her the second time. So, he suffered his hunger for that day. On the next day, he told everything to his sister. She gave him some rice and three strains of hairs. She taught him how to catch the bird.

The younger brother made a net from the hair. He put some rice in front of the net. Looking at the rice, the bird came and tried to pick it up. However, the net hooked its feet. Thus, it was trapped in the net. The young boy told the bird that he would kill it. He said that he would give the bird's two legs to his sister and would take the bird's body for himself. The bird promised him a Yai (magical diamond stone) in place of its life. The Yai would give everything that he wished.

The bird took out the Yai from his mouth and gave it to the boy. The bird was set free. The brother took his sister and fled away to a deserted area. They built a palace with the help of the Yai. With the help of the Yai, they gave a lot of food and clothing to many poor people. Their mother and the stepfather grew poorer day by day. They had heard of the children's fame. So, the couple approached to the children for help. They were given good food, clothing and treasures. On the way back, the mother died because of embarrassment. The stepfather returned home with all the gifts. In another version of the story, the brother and the sister planned to kill both the mother and the stepfather. So, the brother gave the couple two bamboo bottles filled with bees. He told them that the bamboo bottles contained drinks for them. On the way back to home, the couple fell tired of their journey. So, without looking into the bamboo bottles, they opened the bamboo bottles. They bees stung them, and they died. The brother and the sister lived happily ever after.

== See also ==
- Imoinu (Emoinu) - Meitei goddess of wealth
- Ireima (Ereima) - Meitei goddess of water
- Leimarel (Leimalel) - Meitei goddess of earth
- Ngaleima - Meitei goddess of fish
- Panthoibi - Meitei goddess of civilization, love and warfare
- Phouoibi (Phouleima) - Meitei goddess of agricultural crops
- Thumleima - Meitei goddess of salt
