= Meitei folklore =

Folklore of the Meitei people

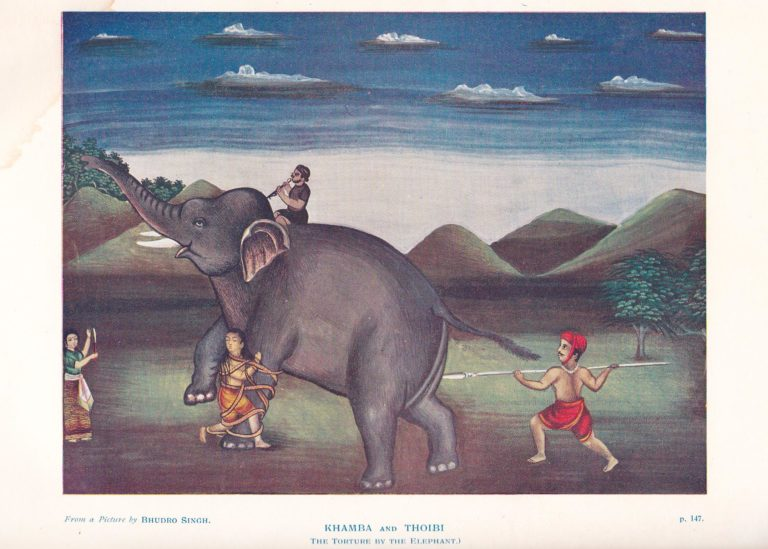
A scene from the Khamba Thoibi epic legends of ancient Moirang, a southern province of Ancient Manipur.

Meitei folklore is the folklore and mythology of the Meitei people of Manipur, India.

Such folklore is traditionally passed from generation to generation. Currently, the government of Manipur is planning to preserve the folklore of the Meitei people through primary education in government institutions.

== See also ==
- Meitei folktales
