= Khuman Tongbu =

Khuman Tongbu (ꯈꯨꯃꯟ ꯇꯣꯡꯕꯨ) was a warrior from the Khuman clan of ancient Kangleipak (early Manipur). He was known for his unmatched bravery, martial skills, and tragic end. He is mentioned in the classical Meitei literary work Chainarol, an anthology of real-life single combats. He lived during a time when personal duels served as a means of settling disputes, asserting clan honour, and preserving personal and communal dignity.

Khuman Tongbu's character is emblematic of martial honour, as even in betrayal, he demonstrated the dignity and ritual conduct expected of a warrior. His cultural values show the social pressures on men to perform martial feats, often under the influence of familial and communal expectations. His story is a tragedy of heroism, as his end is both heroic and tragic, a cautionary tale of pride, trust, and the consequences of underestimated deceit.

== Historical and cultural background ==
The Khuman clan was one of the principal lineages in ancient Kangleipak (early Manipur), rivaling others such as the Moirang and Ningthouja/Mangang Meitei clans. In this martial culture, individual valour was highly esteemed, and warriors often engaged in arranged single combats to prove their strength and maintain clan pride. Khuman Tongbu was one such warrior, remembered for his fearless attitude and strict adherence to the warrior code, even in the face of treachery.

== Duel ==
The duel involving Khuman Tongbu is one of the most well described narratives in the Chainarol. His confrontation took place at Adon Mairengba Maroupan, a border area between the Moirang kingdom and Khuman kingdom, beneath a significant silk-cotton tree, a symbolic site of challenge and combat.

=== Challenge ===
Tongbu had gained a reputation as an undefeated warrior. This status drew the envy of two Moirang warriors, Ahou Meikayang and Athingmongbisu, who were provoked by their wives to prove their masculinity. They devised a plan to ambush Tongbu, one would confront him, and the other would lie in wait.

When approached with a duel, Tongbu at first hesitated, citing an injury from a previous combat with another warrior, Khurai Ngaren Pamba. He asked for a day's time to prepare, but this was denied. Ignoring the ominous signs and his wife's plea, he prepared for the duel with ceremonial food and wine, a traditional practice of ancient Kangleipak.

=== Combat and death ===
The Moirang warriors ambushed Tongbu. Despite being seriously wounded, Tongbu retained his composure and fulfilled the warrior customs. He offered his opponents the food and drink he had brought and requested a swift and honourable decapitation to preserve his dignity and prevent desecration of his corpse by scavengers.

His death, though brought about by deceit, was met with grace and honour, exemplifying the noble warrior ideals upheld in the Chainarol.

== See also ==
- Khuman warrior traditions
- Meitei martial arts
- Meitei traditional weapons
- Khuman kingdom
- Moirang kingdom
- Khuman dynasty
- Khuman Apokpa
- List of Khuman kings
- List of Khuman queens
- Khuman royal necklace incident
- Khuman Kangleirol
- Moirang Kangleirol
- Khuman Puremba
- Khuman Khamba
- Khumanlol
- Khuman language
- Khuman Kwakpa Litonpanba
- Maithingkongaba
- Thongbu Wainucha
- Chakha Moiremba
- Haoba Athouba
- Haokhong Sinaikhu
- Kangchin
- Kaoba Hingamba
