= Namun Chaobi =

Namun Chaobi (ꯅꯥꯃꯨꯟ ꯆꯥꯎꯕꯤ) was a noblewoman of the Khuman clan in ancient Kangleipak (early Manipur), best known from the classical Meitei literary work Chainarol (An Account of Combats). She is remembered for her role as the widow of the Khuman warrior Chakha Moiremba, and for her unwavering pursuit of justice following her husband's death in a ritual combat.

== Background ==
Namun Chaobi was married to Chakha Moiremba, a brave and honourable warrior of the Khuman clan. Her name is associated with loyalty, courage, and agency in a highly patriarchal warrior society. Though not a combatant herself, her actions deeply influenced the events that followed one of the most iconic duels recorded in the Chainarol.

== Role in the duel aftermath ==
After Chakha Moiremba was killed in single combat by Kangbishu, a fearsome warrior from the Heirem community, Namun Chaobi mourned his death but did not accept it passively. She initially appealed to the Khuman king, requesting official revenge for her husband's death on the trickster Heirem warrior.

The Khuman king refused, declaring that Chakha Moiremba had accepted the terms of ritual combat voluntarily and died in honourable fashion, even if his opponent had acted deceitfully.

== Pursuit of justice ==
Refusing to be silenced, Namun Chaobi sought out her long-separated brother-in-law (husband's brother), and persuaded him to avenge Chakha Moiremba's death. He agreed. In a daring operation conducted at night, the brother-in-law infiltrated the Heirem settlement, where Kangbishu lived. He beheaded Kangbishu as well as the warriors who had stood guard by his side. The decapitated heads were taken back to the Khuman territory, where justice was seen as fulfilled.

== See also ==
- Women in Meitei civilisation
- Khuman warrior traditions
- Meitei martial arts
- Meitei traditional weapons
- Khuman kingdom
- Moirang kingdom
- Khuman dynasty
- Khuman Apokpa
- List of Khuman kings
- List of Khuman queens
- Khuman royal necklace incident
- Khuman Kangleirol
- Moirang Kangleirol
- Khuman Puremba
- Khuman Khamba
- Khumanlol
- Khuman language
- Khuman Kwakpa Litonpanba
- Maithingkongaba
