= Thongbu Wainucha =

Thongbu Wainucha (ꯊꯣꯡꯕꯨ ꯋꯥꯏꯅꯨꯆꯥ) was a warrior of the Khuman clan in ancient Kangleipak (early Manipur). He is notably mentioned in the classical Meitei text Chainarol (An Account of Combats), where he is portrayed as a brave fighter whose strength and fame were unmatched in his time. His tragic end, however, is remembered as a cautionary tale of betrayal in battle.

== Background ==
Thongbu Wainucha lived during a period when clan-based warfare and one-on-one ritual combat were central to the martial culture of ancient Meitei civilisation in Manipur. He belonged to the Khuman kingdom, one of the major clan-dynasty-based kingdoms before the unification of Manipur under the Meitei kings.

Thongbu Wainucha was celebrated for his physical prowess, courage, and invincibility in combat, often traveling with a companion or second to help assert territorial or honour-related claims.

== Encounter at Waya Khong ==
Thongbu Wainucha's most notable combat is recorded in the Chainarol, during his journey to annex the region of Waya Khong, a place admired for its beauty and strategic value. Accompanied by his comrade Makpiting Haomiyacha, Thongbu encountered Khoiri Tonjaosu, a warrior of Moirang kingdom, and his companion Khoiri Lamsingba, who had also come to claim the same territory.

At first, the two parties attempted a spear duel, which ended without a clear winner. They then engaged in wrestling, which too proved inconclusive for a long time.

== Betrayal and death ==
The stalemate was broken when Khoiri Tonjaosu, prompted by his companion, resorted to dishonourable tactics. During the wrestling match, he bit Thongbu Wainucha's private parts, causing severe injury. Overcome with pain and unable to continue, Thongbu collapsed.

Khoiri Tonjaosu then beheaded the wounded Khuman warrior, placing his head in a basket and returned triumphantly to Moirang. This act, though bringing victory, was seen as a breach of the martial code of honour upheld by the combatants of the time.

== Related pages ==
- Khuman warrior traditions
- Meitei martial arts
- Meitei traditional weapons
- Khuman dynasty
- Khuman Apokpa
- List of Khuman kings
- List of Khuman queens
- Khuman royal necklace incident
- Khuman Kangleirol
- Moirang Kangleirol
- Khuman Puremba
- Khuman Khamba
- Khumanlol
- Khuman language
- Khuman Kwakpa Litonpanba
- Maithingkongaba
- Chakha Moiremba
- Haoba Athouba
- Haokhong Sinaikhu
- Kangchin
