= Haokhong Sinaikhu =

Haokhong Sinaikhu (Note: written in traditional Meitei Mayek script as ꯍꯥꯎꯈꯣꯡ ꯁꯤꯅꯥꯏꯈꯨ.) was a Khuman warrior mentioned in the classical Meitei literary work Chainarol (An Account of Combats). He had a duel with the Meitei warrior named Tengleimaka Amba. He fought with his opponent for the honour, oath-keeping, and divine justice in Meitei martial tradition.

== Background ==
Haokhong Sinaikhu belonged to the Khuman clan, the major clan lineage in Khuman kingdom, known for its military might and skilled warriors. During his time, formal one-on-one combats were a common way to settle disputes or prove bravery between warriors from different clans or communities. It involved shared codes of conduct, rooted in ritual and honour.

== Fighting ==
Sinaikhu engaged in a duel with Tengleimaka Amba, a warrior of the Ningthouja/Mangang clan. In the fight, Haokhong Sinaikhu's spear was the first to strike him, which caused bleeding from the opponent. It should have confirmed his victory, but Tengleimaka Amba requested him to spare his life, and to allow him to return home alive. He promised to him by showing his spear that he would tell others he had been defeated.

Moved by his opponent's humble request and the oath taken, Sinaikhu spared him and eventually returned to the Khuman kingdom, claiming victory.

== Oath-breaking ==
Later, a Khuman singer traveling to the Ningthouja/Mangang kingdom, saw Tengleimaka Amba alive and well, getting dressed as a noble and heading to court. When he asked him why he was not dead as believed, Tengleimaka made fun of the Khuman claim, denying that he had ever been defeated.

Upon hearing this news, Haokhong Sinaikhu felt deep shame for being dishonoured by a false oath. Remembering that the opponent had sworn by the spear, Sinaikhu threw his spear into a fire, calling upon divine justice. Soon afterward, Tengleimaka Amba died suddenly. His death was believed to be the result of breaking his sacred promise.

== See also ==
- Khuman warrior traditions
- Meitei martial arts
- Meitei traditional weapons
- Moirang kingdom
- Khuman dynasty
- Khuman Apokpa
- List of Khuman kings
- List of Khuman queens
- Khuman royal necklace incident
- Khuman Kangleirol
- Moirang Kangleirol
- Khuman Puremba
- Khuman Khamba
- Khumanlol
- Khuman language
- Khuman Kwakpa Litonpanba
- Maithingkongaba
- Thongbu Wainucha
- Chakha Moiremba
- Haoba Athouba
- Kangchin
