= Kangchin (Khuman warrior) =

Kangchin (ꯀꯥꯡꯆꯤꯟ) was a warrior of the Khuman clan in ancient Kangleipak (early Manipur). He is known for his cunning and bravery during a duel with a Meitei warrior named Chimarangba. His story is notably mentioned in the classical Meitei literary work Chainarol, that documents historic and semi-historic single combats between warriors of various early Meitei clans. Kangchin is celebrated for his presence of mind and bold strategy that turned certain defeat into victory.

Kangchin is remembered for his intelligence overcoming brute force, his quick thinking, composure under pressure, and use of cultural ritual to disarm a deceitful opponent. He faced the tension between honourable combat (or warrior code) and betrayal (or treachery). Unlike other warriors who used brute strength, Kangchin's victory stemmed from psychological agility. By defeating a dishonourable enemy, Kangchin restores justice and personal dignity.

== Historical context ==
The period in which Kangchin lived was marked by inter-clan rivalries in ancient Kangleipak (present-day Manipur). The Khuman, Moirang clan, Ningthouja/Mangang, and other clans frequently clashed in contests of honour through ritualized single combat. These duels followed a martial code, showing courage, sportsmanship, and ritual respect, though at times they also revealed treachery and deceit.

== Encounter with opponent ==
The encounter between Kangchin and Chimarangba, a warrior from the Ningthouja/Mangang clan, took place at a place called Kangamung. Both warriors met each other on the way and laid claim to the same tract of land. Their dispute led to an agreement to resolve the matter through a non-lethal challenge.

== Challenge ==
Kangchin and Chimarangba decided that the land in dispute would belong to the warrior who could first hoist his pennant on a broad-leafed tree the following morning. According to their pact, both were to appear unarmed to ensure a fair contest.

== Breach of Honour ==
Kangchin arrived first at the tree, climbed it, and hoisted his flag. However, Chimarangba arrived shortly afterward, armed with a spear and shield, violating their agreement. From below, he declared the land his and prepared to attack Kangchin, who was trapped in the tree.

== Turnaround ==
Kangchin quickly devised a clever strategy. Pretending to surrender, he requested that they share a final meal, invoking the warrior tradition of consuming food and drink brought by one's wife before death. Moved by the gesture, Chimarangba disarmed himself.

In a swift and surprising move, Kangchin leapt from the tree, overpowered the unarmed opponent, and beheaded him, claiming both victory and honour.

== See also ==
- Khuman warrior traditions
- Meitei martial arts
- Meitei traditional weapons
- Khuman kingdom
- Moirang kingdom
- Khuman dynasty
- Khuman Apokpa
- List of Khuman kings
- List of Khuman queens
- Khuman royal necklace incident
- Khuman Kangleirol
- Moirang Kangleirol
- Khuman Puremba
- Khuman Khamba
- Khumanlol
- Khuman language
- Khuman Kwakpa Litonpanba
- Maithingkongaba
- Thongbu Wainucha
- Chakha Moiremba
- Haoba Athouba
- Haokhong Sinaikhu
