= Chakha Moiremba =

Chakha Moiremba (ꯆꯥꯈꯥ ꯃꯣꯏꯔꯦꯝꯕ) was an ancient warrior of the Khuman clan in early Khuman kingdom. He is remembered for his tragic yet heroic duel with Kangbishu, a fighter of the ancient Heirem community. His story is notably mentioned in the classical Meitei literary work Chainarol (An Account of Combats), which records 27 real-life single combats between warriors of different clans of Meitei civilisation of ancient Kangleipak (early Manipur).

== Background ==
Chakha Moiremba belonged to the Khuman clan, one of the prominent clan-based principalities in Manipur in early period. At a time when the Heirem warrior Kangbishu had become a source of fear and oppression in the southern region of the region, none dared to confront him, except Chakha Moiremba.

== Duel with Kangbishu ==
Despite warnings from his wife Namun Chaobi, who had a bad dream suggesting danger, Chakha Moiremba volunteered to face Kangbishu in single combat. Before departing, his wife prepared food and drinks for him, a common practice in the Chainarol, where duels were conducted with ritualistic respect, even among enemies.

The two warriors met, armed with spears, and prepared for the fight by measuring the distance between them. Out of respect, Chakha Moiremba offered Kangbishu the advantage of fighting on his home ground. Kangbishu refused, stating that since the Khuman warrior issued the challenge, he should strike first.

Chakha Moiremba's spear grazed Kangbishu's foot, but Kangbishu lied, claiming it was because of only a leech bite and not a wound caused by the spear. In his turn, Kangbishu threw his spear and fatally struck Chakha Moiremba in the abdomen.

== Final moments ==
Even in defeat, Chakha Moiremba showed great dignity. He offered his rival the food and wine prepared by his wife. He begged Kangbishu to take his head swiftly and without torture. He died with honour, following the warrior code.

== Revenge and legacy ==
Soon after the duel, Kangbishu fell seriously ill, which was interpreted as divine punishment for his deceit in battle. Chakha Moiremba's widowed wife, Namun Chaobi, appealed to the Khuman king for revenge, but her plea was rejected. She then found her long-lost brother-in-law (Chakha Moiremba's brother), who entered Kangbishu's residence at night and killed both Kangbishu and his guards, bringing back their heads to the Khuman kingdom.

== See also ==
- Khuman warrior traditions
- Meitei martial arts
- Meitei traditional weapons
- Moirang kingdom
- Khuman dynasty
- Khuman Apokpa
- List of Khuman kings
- List of Khuman queens
- Khuman royal necklace incident
- Khuman Kangleirol
- Moirang Kangleirol
- Khuman Puremba
- Khuman Khamba
- Khumanlol
- Khuman language
- Khuman Kwakpa Litonpanba
- Maithingkongaba
- Thongbu Wainucha
- Haoba Athouba
- Haokhong Sinaikhu
- Kangchin
