= Khuman martial traditions =

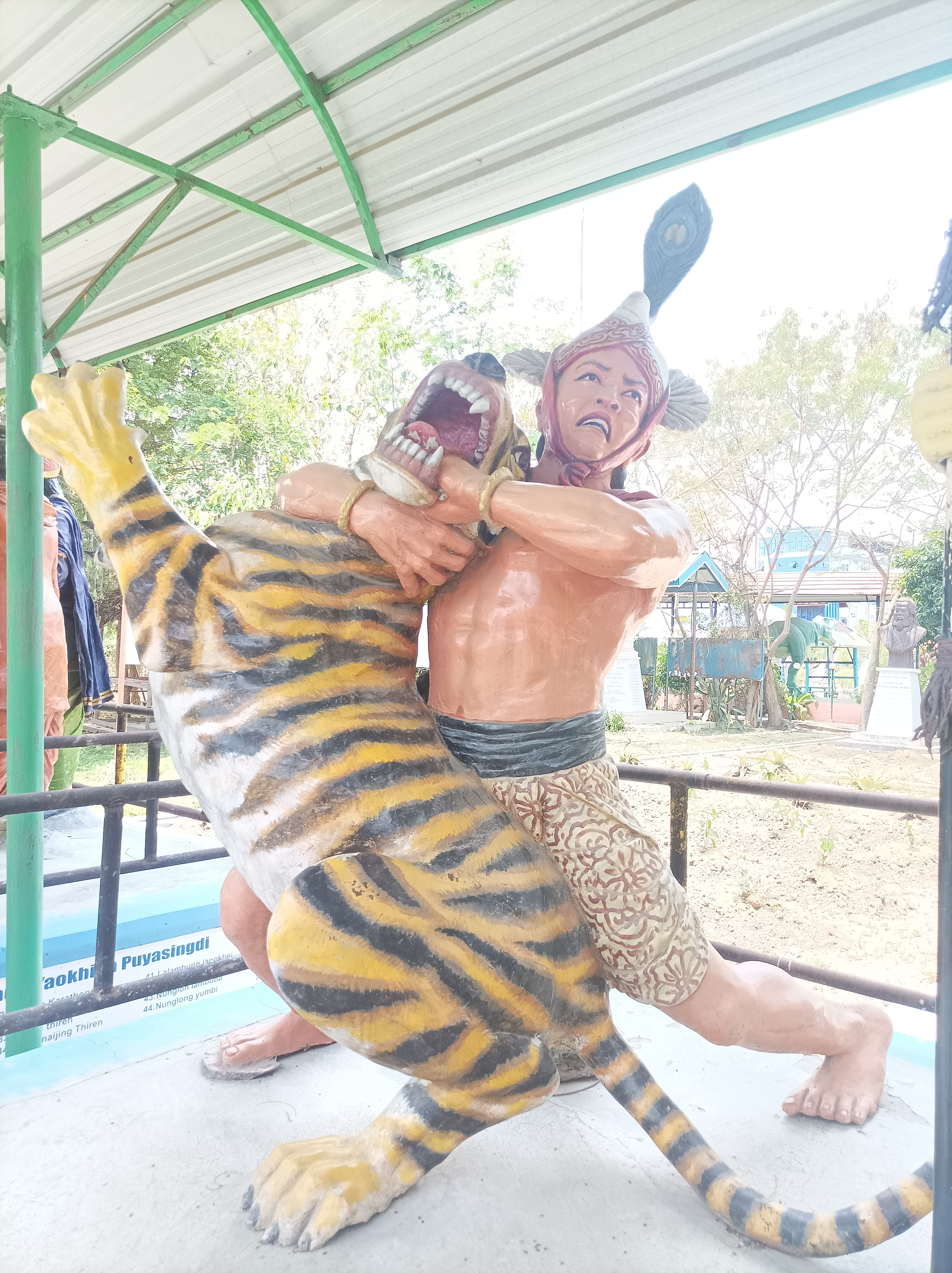
In the Moirang Kangleirol tradition, Puremba (Purenba), a warrior of Khuman clan, is remembered for capturing wild tigers in the Torbung hunting incident.

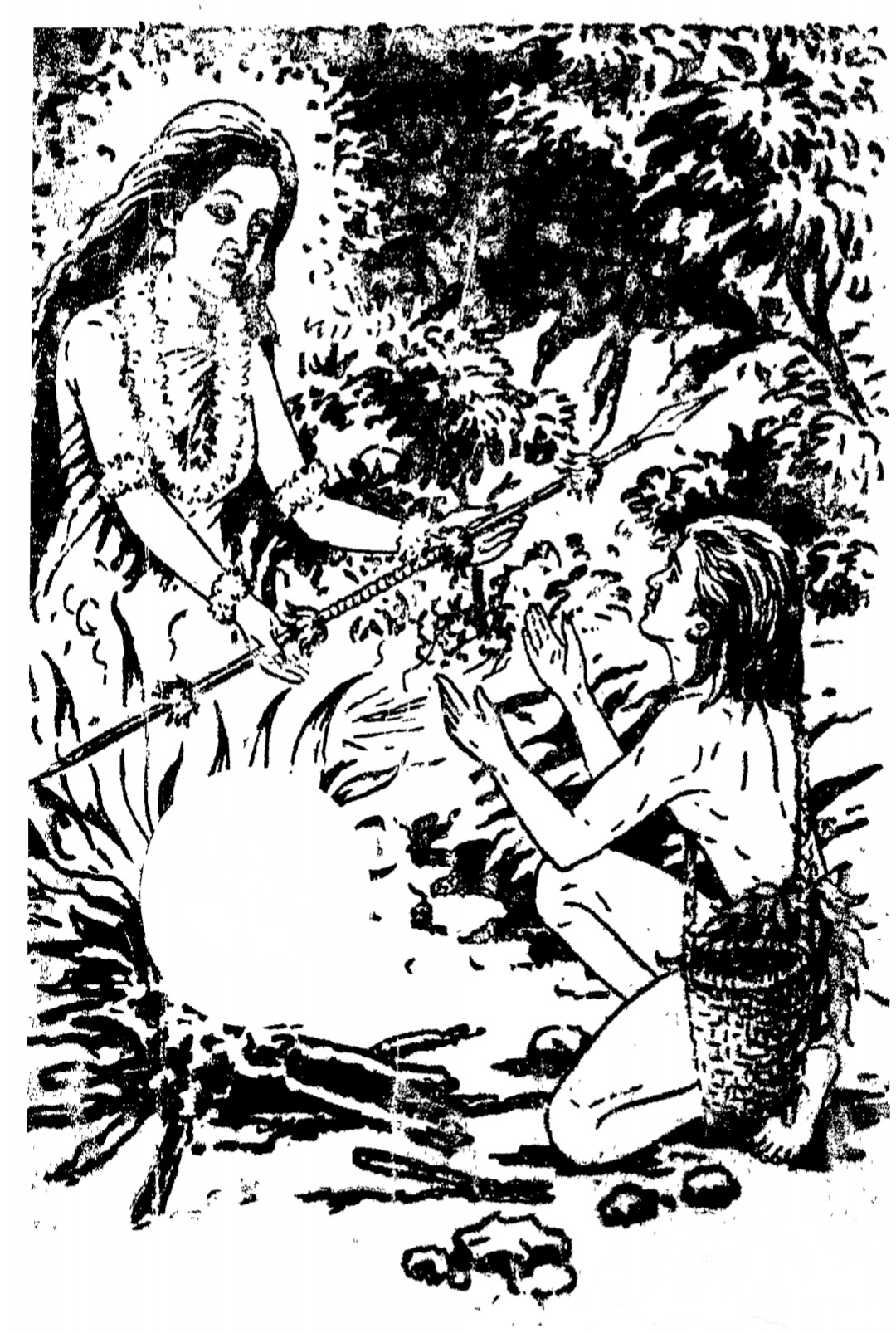
A Meitei goddess blessing a Khuman warrior with a divine weapon

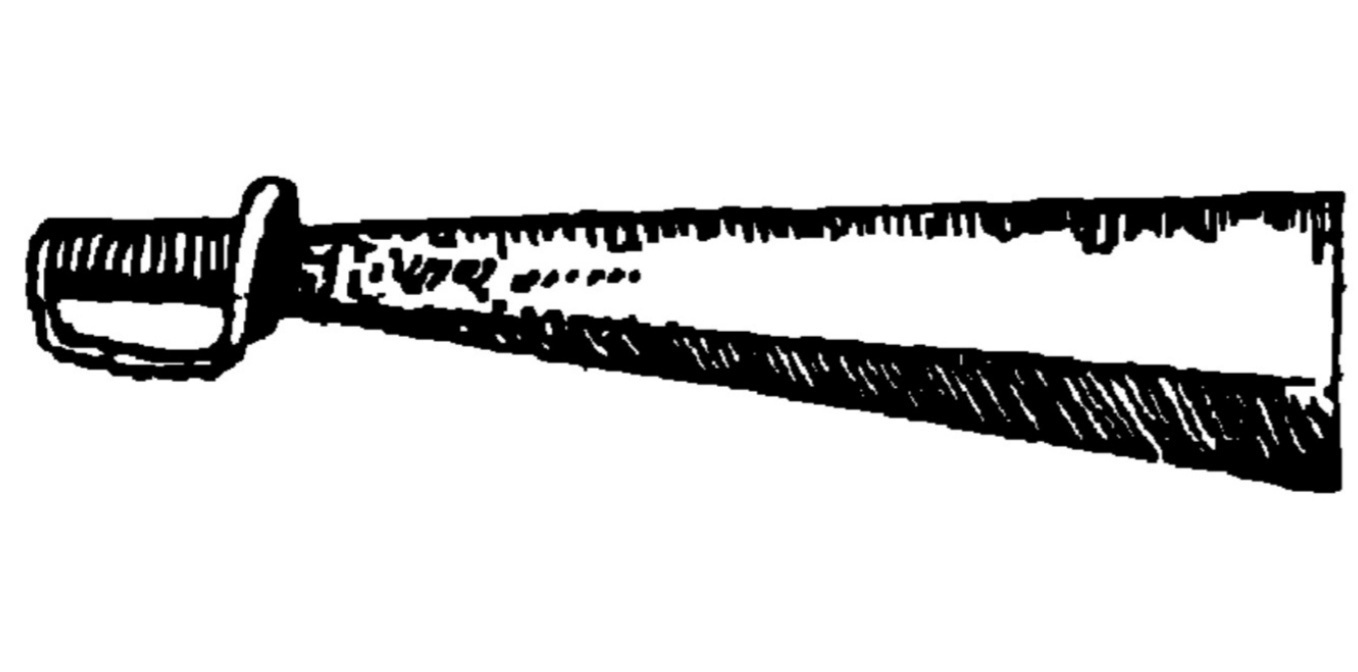
Khuman dynasty traditional emblematic sword was used for both warfare as well as ritualistic ceremonies.

Khuman martial traditions or Khuman warrior traditions (ꯈꯨꯃꯟ ꯂꯥꯜꯂꯣꯡ) refer to the code, customs, and cultural values surrounding warfare and personal combat practiced by the Khuman clan in Kangleipak, present-day Manipur, India. Drawing on ancient Meitei literature, including the Thawanthaba Hiran, the Chainarol (an account of combats), the Khuman Kangleirol traditions, the Moirang Kangleirol traditions, these literary works show how the Khumans perceived honour, conflict, and inter-clan interactions.

== Historical context ==
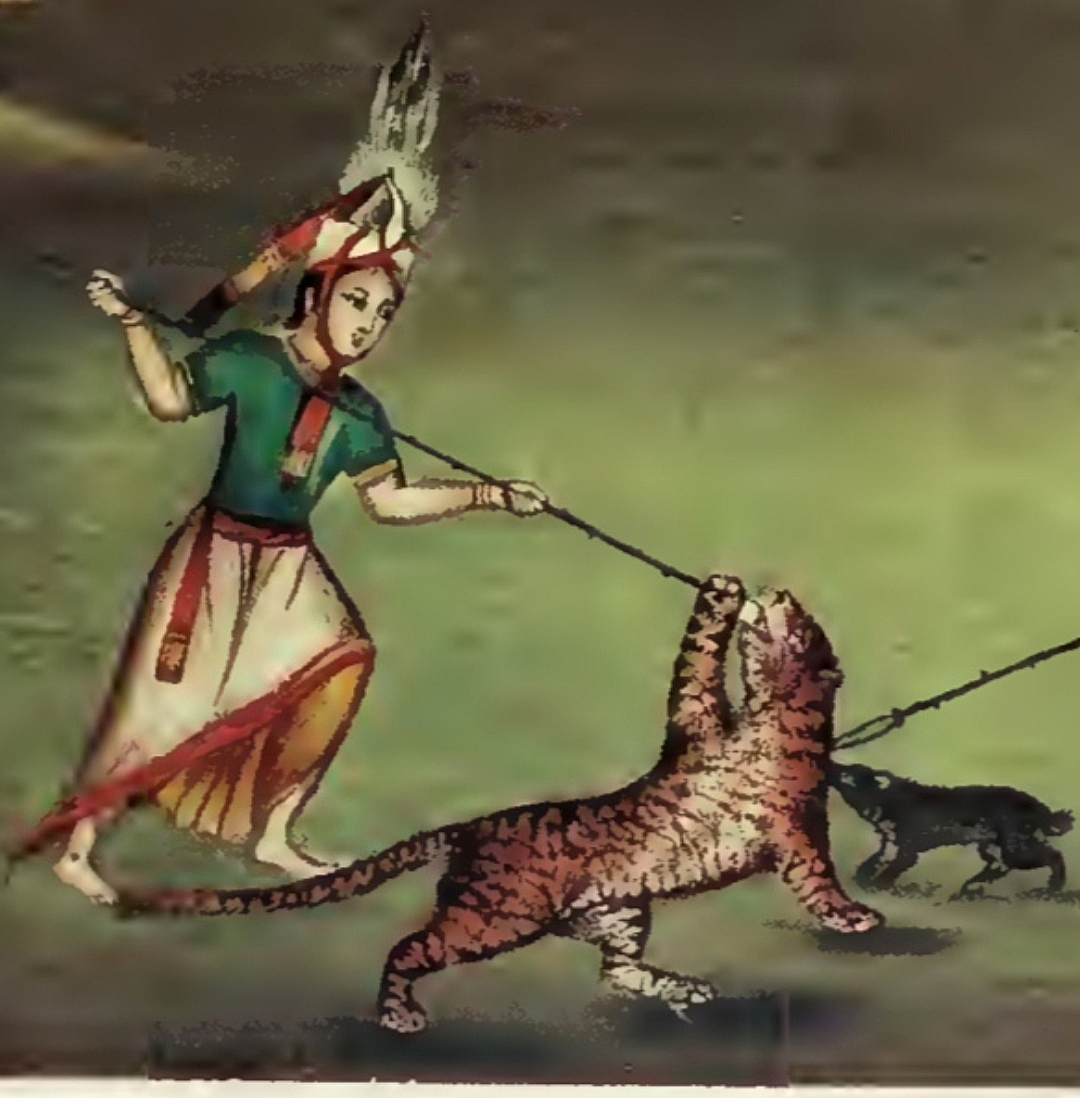
Khuman Khamba, a warrior of Khuman clan, was remembered for a successful mission to kill a tiger in Ancient Moirang kingdom.

The Khumans were one of the major clan-based polities in the Imphal Valley, whose political autonomy and martial culture were well-acknowledged by neighboring clan dynasties like the Meiteis (Ningthoujas) and Moirangs.

In the Thawanthaba Hiran text, Khuman King Punshiba displays strategic depth, using marriages, military expeditions, and even ambushes to advance Khuman interests.

In the Chainarol text, Khuman warriors are frequent figures in ritualised one-to-one combat narratives, cementing their reputation for courage and fidelity to codes of honour.

== Core features of Khuman martial culture ==
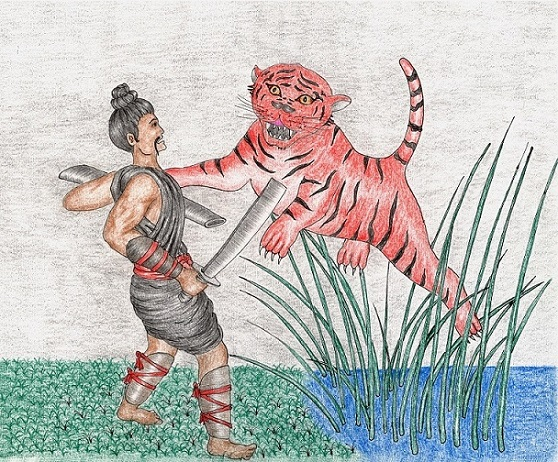
Khuman Puremba fighting with a tiger at Torbung hunting incident

=== Ritualised single combat ===
Khuman warriors were instrumental in popularising face-to-face duels. In Chainarol, combatants would choose a site, agree to standards (weapons used, sequence of strikes), and conduct formal challenges, often beginning with ceremonial sharing of food, drink, and farewells from their wives. Chakha Moiremba, a Khuman warrior, entered a formal spear duel with Kangbishu of the Heirem group. Even in death, Moiremba followed convention by offering a parting meal and requesting a dignified beheading.

=== Adherence to honour code ===
Khuman fighters upheld a strict moral framework. They acknowledged victory or defeat openly and demonstrated composure in death. They even invoked ancestral deities to witness truth and honour. Khuman warrior Haokhong Sinaikhu spared his rival Tengleimaka Amba after the latter's plea, trusting in the sanctity of his oath and later invoking divine justice when that oath was broken.

=== Ideals of stoicism and fearlessness ===
Khuman warriors were known for their mental resilience. They would hold firm despite physical or spiritual omens. Khuman warrior Chakha Moiremba faced death without fear and spoke graciously to his enemy before succumbing.

=== Female role in martial culture ===
Khuman women played vital roles in both emotional and strategic domains. They prepared final provisions for battles. They provided moral support, or counsel against war, as seen with Moiremba’s wife, who warned him against fighting. After defeat, they sometimes engineered vengeance, as with Lady Namun Chaobi, who persuaded her brother-in-law to retaliate after Moiremba’s death.

=== Pragmatism and strategic flexibility ===
While honour was paramount, Khumans were also astute strategists. In the Thawanthaba Hiran text, Khuman King Punshiba arranged ambushes during joint campaigns. Even as he valued ritual codes, he used espionage and timing to gain advantage.

== Cultural impact and legacy ==
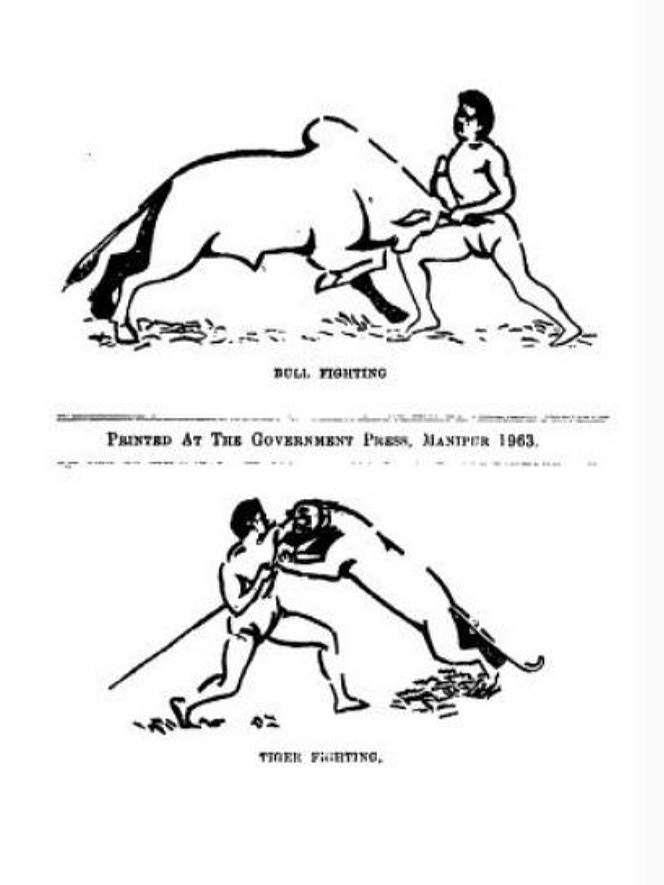
Khuman Khamba, the hero of the Khamba Thoibi epic, and a warrior of Khuman clan, was remembered for performing Kao (bull) fighting and Khoirentak tiger fighting, as parts of his martial traditions.

Khuman martial traditions shaped warrior identity and inter-clan dynastic dynamics in ancient Kangleipak (early Manipur). Their ideal of honour above victory resonates in both Chainarol (through duels) and Thawanthaba Hiran (through royal ethics). Their tales influenced Meitei literature, theatre, cultural memory, and clan ideology long after their integration into the Ningthouja dominion.

=== Key examples ===
Legend / Affair	Source	Description
Chakha Moiremba vs Kangbishu	Chainarol	Moiremba died honourably; his wife’s family avenged him
Haokhong Sinaikhu vs Tengleimaka Amba	Chainarol	Mercy shown; oath-breaking led to divine retribution
Ambush of Khuman scouts	Thawanthābā Hiran	Strategic response; head-taking for injustice
Marriage & vengeance narrative	Thawanthābā Hiran	Inter-clan/inter-dynastic diplomacy turned fatal; Khumans retaliate honorably

== Related pages ==
- Meitei martial arts
- Meitei traditional weapons
- Khuman kingdom
- Moirang kingdom
- Khuman dynasty
- Khuman Apokpa
- List of Khuman kings
- List of Khuman queens
- Khuman royal necklace incident
- Khuman Kangleirol
- Moirang Kangleirol
- Khumanlol
- Khuman language
- Khuman Kwakpa Litonpanba
- Khuman Maithingkongaba
- Khuman Thongbu Wainucha
- Khuman Chakha Moiremba
- Khuman Haoba Athouba
- Khuman Haokhong Sinaikhu
- Khuman Kangchin
- Khuman Tongbu

== Bibliography ==
- Khelchandra Singh, Ningthoukhongjam (1980). Khuman Kangleirol (in Manipuri). India: Digital Library of India; Internet Archive.
- Kullachandra Sharma, B (1998). Khuman Ningthouron Lambuba (in Manipuri). India: Digital Library of India; Internet Archive.
- Ibobi, Laikhuram (1998). Khuman Kangleiron Amasung Laikhuram Shageigee Meihouron (in Manipuri). India: Digital Library of India; Internet Archive.
- Kullachandra, B. (1989-03-15). Khumal Ningthourol Lambuba (in Manipuri). India: Digital Library of India; Internet Archive.
