= Maithingkongaba =

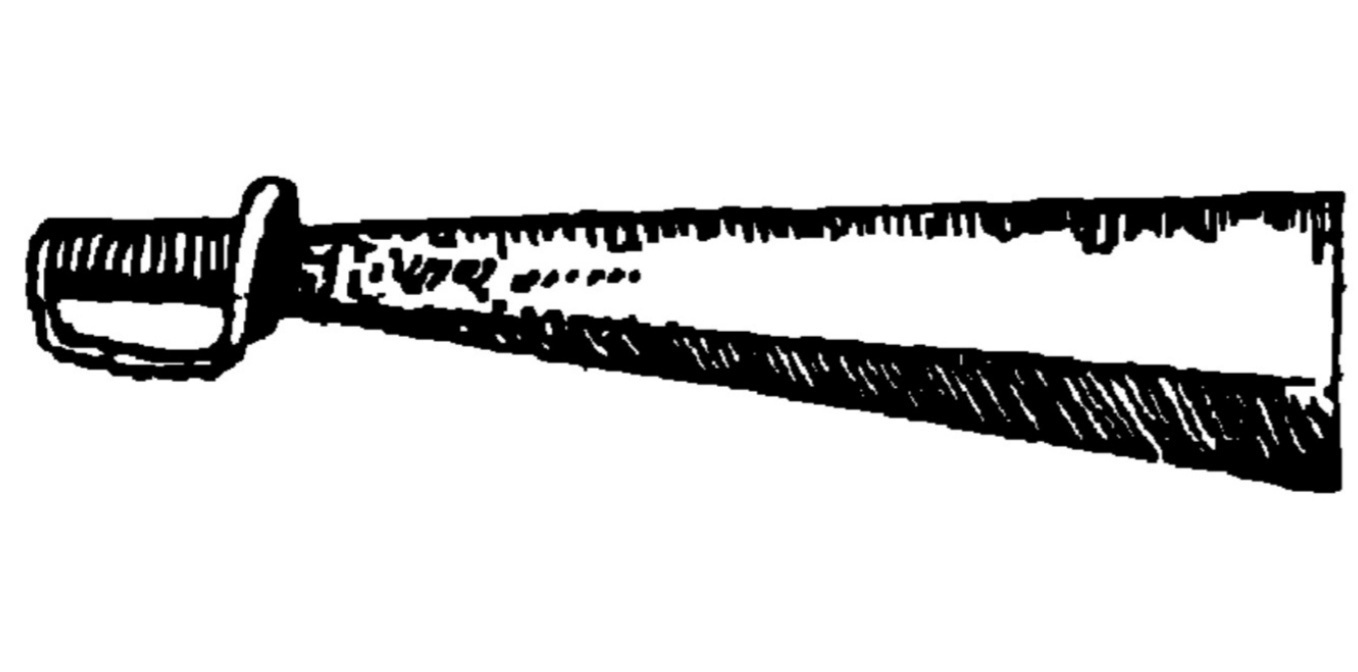
Sword of the Khuman group

Maithingkongaba (ꯃꯥꯏꯊꯤꯡꯀꯣꯡꯉꯥꯕ) was a warrior of the Khuman clan who lived in ancient Kangleipak (early Manipur). He is notably mentioned in the historical classical Meitei text Chainarol, a collection of dramatic real-life duels between warriors from various clans. His encounter with the Meitei warrior named Akangsu is remembered for its ironic twist and serves as an example of both overconfidence and unexpected mercy in the warrior tradition of Manipur. His experience shows that even the most well-prepared warriors can fall if they let their guard down.

== Background ==
During Maithingkongaba's times, clan-based warrior culture played a central role in maintaining honour, reputation, and social order. Warriors often issued direct challenges to their counterparts, and these duels were often ceremonial, having shared meals and a code of conduct even in the face of death.

Maithingkongaba’s tale is one of the many that show the unpredictability of combat, where not just strength, but wit and timing, play decisive roles.

== Encounter at Waisen Pheibok Yi ==
Maithingkongaba, dressed up in full warrior attire and equipped with sword, spear, and shield, left his home in search of combat. His destination was Waisen Pheibok Yi, a known location for warrior duels.

There, he came across Akangsu, a Meitei man, engaged in fishing. Spotting what seemed to be an easy target, Maithingkongaba challenged Akangsu to a fight. However, Akangsu, being unarmed and focused on his fishing task, politely requested a short delay, stating that he had not yet caught enough fish. Maithingkongaba, confident and perhaps dismissive, agreed and settled under the shade of a nearby tree. In a moment of carelessness, he fell asleep.

== Turn of events ==
As Maithingkongaba fell asleep, Akangsu seized the opportunity. Quietly approaching the sleeping Khuman warrior, he overpowered and bound Maithingkongaba’s hands and feet. The situation, which had begun with Maithingkongaba holding the upper hand, had completely reversed.

Fearing for his life, Maithingkongaba pleaded for mercy. He offered his fine warrior garments and weapons as trophies, hoping that Akangsu might spare his life and return home as a victor. In a surprising act of compassion, Akangsu chose not to kill him. He untied the Khuman warrior and allowed him to live. Akangsu then returned to his people, displaying the captured weapons and garb as symbols of his cunning victory.

== See also ==
- Khuman warrior traditions
- Meitei martial arts
- Meitei traditional weapons
- Khuman kingdom
- Moirang kingdom
- Khuman dynasty
- Khuman Apokpa
- List of Khuman kings
- List of Khuman queens
- Khuman royal necklace incident
- Khuman Kangleirol
- Moirang Kangleirol
- Khuman Puremba
- Khuman Khamba
- Khumanlol
- Khuman language
- Khuman Kwakpa Litonpanba
- Thongbu Wainucha
- Chakha Moiremba
- Haoba Athouba
- Haokhong Sinaikhu
- Kangchin
