= Kangbishu =

Kangbishu or Kangbisu (ꯀꯥꯡꯕꯤꯁꯨ) was a warrior of the Heirem community, an influential group in ancient Kangleipak (early Manipur). He is best known for his legendary single combat with Chakha Moiremba of the Khuman clan, an episode recorded in the classical Meitei martial chronicle Chainarol (An Account of Combats). His story shows themes of martial pride, betrayal, divine retribution, and clan rivalry in early Manipur. While he was undoubtedly a skilled and fearsome warrior, his story also warns against dishonourable conduct in combat. His downfall serves as a moral lesson in ancient Meitei literature, showing how violating the unwritten codes of single combat leads to both social disgrace and divine retribution.

== Background ==
Kangbishu belonged to the Heirem clan, a militarily dominant community located in the southern part of the Manipur valley. By the time of his famed duel, Kangbishu had gained a fearsome reputation and was considered a threat to the safety and dignity of other clans, especially the Khumans.

== Duel with Chakha Moiremba ==
When no other warrior dared to face Kangbishu, Chakha Moiremba, a brave Khuman fighter, volunteered to meet him in single combat.

The fight followed the customary code of honour typical of Chainarol traditions. The warriors met armed with spears and observed pre-combat formalities. Chakha Moiremba was allowed the first strike. His spear grazed Kangbishu's foot, but Kangbishu denied being wounded, claiming instead that the blood came from a leech bite, a clear act of deception. Kangbishu then retaliated with full force. His spear struck Chakha Moiremba in the abdomen, fatally wounding him. Despite the dishonourable tactic, Kangbishu accepted the food and drink offered by the dying Khuman and took his head as per martial custom.

== Death ==
After his apparent victory, Kangbishu returned home with Chakha Moiremba's head encaged in a wicker basket. However, he soon fell seriously ill, which was interpreted as divine punishment for violating the warrior code by lying about his injury and winning through deceit.

Chakha Moiremba's widowed wife, Namun Chaobi, sought vengeance for her husband's death. Though her request was rejected by the Khuman king, she eventually found her brother-in-law (Chakha Moiremba's brother) who took it upon himself to avenge Chakha's death.

In a daring nighttime operation, the avenger entered Kangbishu's home, killed both him and his guards, and returned with their severed heads.

== See also ==
- Meitei martial arts
- Meitei traditional weapons
- Khuman martial traditions
- Khuman kingdom
- Meitei warriors
