= Chimarangba =

Chimarangba (ꯆꯤꯃꯥꯔꯥꯡꯕ) was a Meitei warrior of Mangang clan in ancient Kangleipak (present-day Manipur). He is notably mentioned in the classical Meitei historical-literary work Chainarol, a collection of narratives centered on one-on-one combats between warriors from different clans. His story is known for his moral complexity and for the dramatic turn it takes during his fateful duel with a Khuman warrior named Kangchin. He is remembered not only for his violation of the warrior's code of conduct but also as a caution in how betrayal can lead to one's downfall.

== Background ==
During the early period of Manipur, warfare among clans such as the Meitei Mangang, Khuman, Moirang clan, and others was often ritualized through structured single combats. These duels, rich in ceremonial and ethical dimensions, were expressions of both personal honour and clan prestige. While the warrior code upheld fairness and integrity, violations of this code, as seen in Chimarangba's case, sometimes led to disgrace.

== Duel at Kangamung ==
=== Dispute ===
Chimarangba and Kangchin met each other at Kangamung, a historic location, each claiming the same plot of land as his own. To avoid open conflict, the two warriors agreed to a peaceful contest. The condition was that the land would belong to the one who hoisted a pennant on a designated tree first at dawn the next day, and importantly, that both would come unarmed.

=== Breach of Code ===
Kangchin arrived early the next morning, climbed the tree, and placed his flag. While he waited above, Chimarangba appeared, violating the agreed rules by bringing weapons. Armed with a spear and shield, Chimarangba declared the land his and demanded Kangchin's surrender, asserting dominance by force rather than by agreement.

=== Turn of events ===
Feigning surrender, Kangchin appealed to Chimarangba's warrior sensibility and asked to share food and drink, provisions prepared by his wife, in accordance with customary practice before death. Chimarangba, perhaps out of pride or misplaced trust, laid down his weapons to participate in the final ritual.

In a sudden and decisive act, Kangchin leapt from the tree, attacked the now-disarmed Chimarangba, and beheaded him, thereby claiming victory and justice.

== See also ==
- Meitei martial arts
- Meitei traditional weapons
- Khuman martial traditions
- Khuman kingdom
- Meitei warriors
