= Thongpu Shamuknucha =

Thongpu Shamuknucha (also called Nongyai Thongpu Shamuknucha, ꯅꯣꯡꯌꯥꯏ ꯊꯣꯡꯄꯨ ꯁꯃꯨꯛꯅꯨꯆꯥ) was the 21st king of the Khuman dynasty, as recorded in the historical chronicle Khuman Kangleiron. He is remembered for his name's legendary origin and for leading a military expedition in the region called Konyang.

== Family ==
Thongpu Shamuknucha was the son of Nongballon Kainoupi Sam-yok, a queen known for her attractive and well-kept hair. Her name was given in reference to this beauty, using local words: Khing khing means "hair" and Kainou means "chignon" or "hair bun". She became popular among the people of the Selloi-Langmai hills for her appearance. The Khuman royal chronicle shows the importance of the queen-mothers, always naming them before telling the story of each king.

== Name origin ==
The name Thongpu Shamuknucha is related to a myth of Chingkhong Poireiton, a figure who came to Earth from the underworld. According to the story, a cow led Poireiton and his followers out of the dark world by using its horns to open the door of the passage. This cow later gave birth to many calves. The Khuman king, Thongpu Shamuknucha, had to raise these animals. To do this, he built a strong corral (an enclosure for animals). Because of this role, he was given the name Nongyai Thongpu Shamuknucha, meaning the one who tended the sacred calves and built the enclosure.

== Military success ==
Thongpu Shamuknucha also led a military campaign southwestward, into the heartland of Konyang. During this campaign, houses of enemies were burned, enemy forces were defeated, the chief's wife, named Haonu Tomson Langmeinu, was also killed in the fighting. After this victory, Thongpu Shamuknucha received the extended title "vanquisher of Haonu Tomson Langmeinu Shantongainubi." The Khuman royal chronicle shows that this name was well-earned due to his success in battle.

== See also ==
- List of Khuman kings
- List of Khuman queens
