= Khuman Kwakpa Litonpanba =

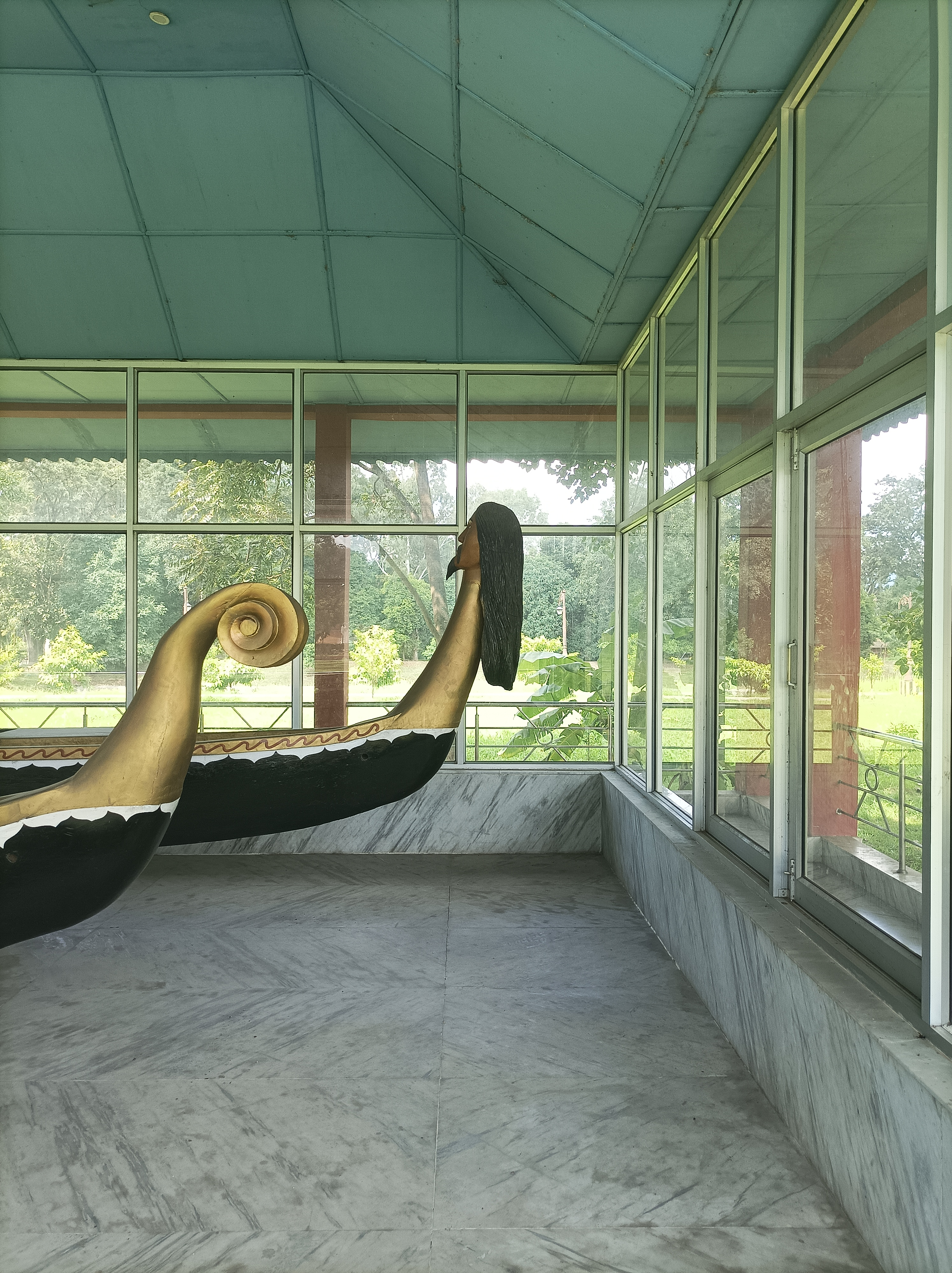
Replica of the beheaded head of Khuman Kwakpa Litonpanba being installed in the stern of the Meitei imperial dragon race boat (Hiyang Hiren), kept in the Kangla Fort, Imphal

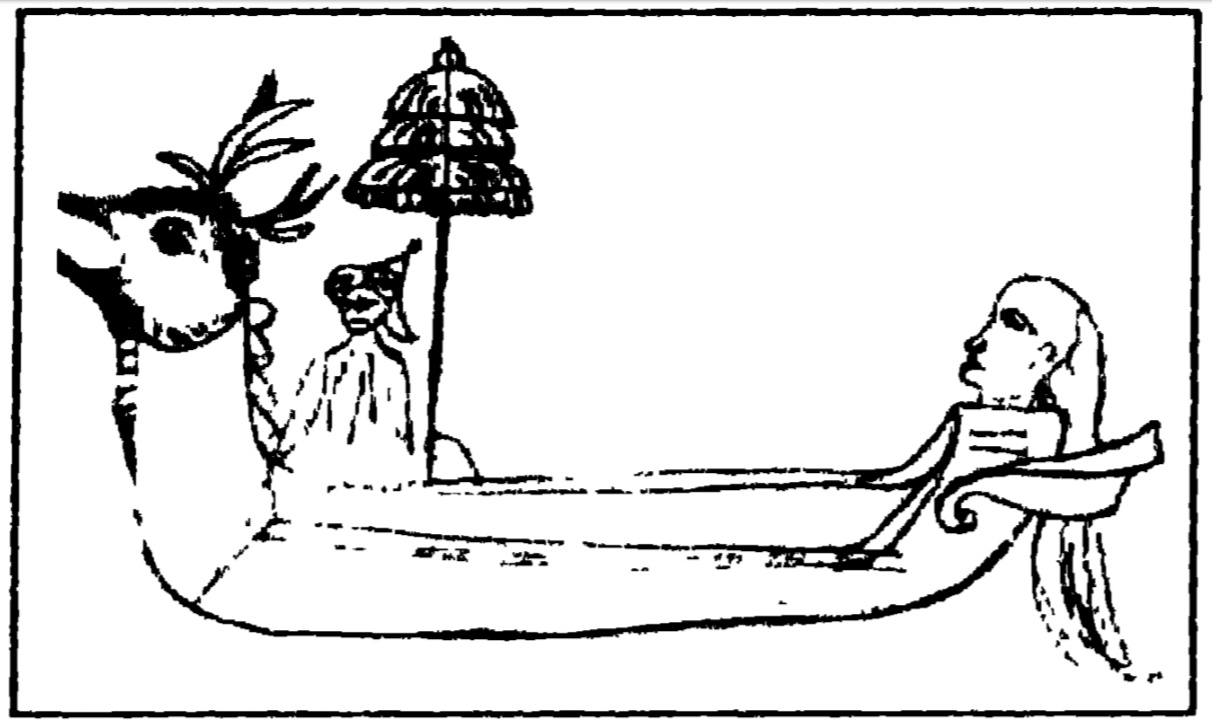
Replica of the beheaded head of Khuman Kwakpa Litonpanba being installed in the stern of the Meitei imperial dragon race boat (Hiyang Hiren)

Khuman Kwakpa Litonpanba (ꯈꯨꯃꯟ ꯀ꯭ꯋꯥꯛꯄ ꯂꯤꯇꯣꯟꯄꯥꯟꯕ), shortly known as Kwakpa Litonpanba (ꯀ꯭ꯋꯥꯛꯄꯥ ꯂꯤꯇꯣꯟꯄꯥꯟꯕꯥ), or Khuman Kwakpa (ꯈꯨꯃꯟ ꯀ꯭ꯋꯥꯛꯄꯥ), was an ancient Khuman warrior mentioned in the classical Meitei language literary-historical narrative Thawanthābā Hiran. Known for his exceptional bravery and daring spirit, he is remembered as one of the most courageous warriors in the conflict between the Khuman kingdom and Meitei (Ningthouja) kingdom during the 13th century CE. His valiant but fatal attempt to capture the Meitei king during a river escape remains one of the most dramatic moments in Meitei folklore and literature.

== Role in the conflict ==
The most well documented event involving Khuman Kwakpa Litonpanba occurs during a critical moment in the war between the Meiteis and the Khumans, following the execution of Meitei Queen Khayoiron Tangja Samphabi (a Khuman princess) by the Meitei Ningthouja king Thawanthaba, and the subsequent retaliatory killing of Khuman Queen Chingkhei Thanbi (a Ningthouja princess) by the Khuman king.

During the escalating conflict, Thawanthābā was trapped in the Khuman kingdom, and he attempted to flee from Khuman territory by boat across a river, making a hasty escape after learning of an imminent ambush by the Khumans. In an act of extraordinary bravery, Khuman Kwakpa Litonpanba leapt into the river and tried to seize the king’s speeding boat, attempting to stop his escape by force.

Despite the strength and skill he demonstrated in the attempt, Litonpānba was ultimately overpowered by the Meitei oarsmen, who struck him down during the encounter.

Kwakpa's plot was detected by Taoriya Elangba, a warrior of the Meitei (Ningthouja) side. Acting swiftly, Taoriya Elangba seized Khuman Kwakpa and beheaded him, bringing a decisive end to the scheme. His death was recorded as a major loss for the Khuman side and is portrayed with tragic heroism in the historical and folk narratives. The Ningthouja Meitei warriors then carried Khuman Kwakpa’s severed head and placed it on the stern of their boat as a powerful symbol of victory over the Khuman kingdom. In later times, replicas of Khuman Kwakpa’s head were installed on traditional boats known as Hiyang Hiren, preserving this event as a lasting emblem of Ningthouja triumph and historical memory.

== Character and symbolism ==
Kwākpā Litonpānba is remembered as loyal to his kingdom. His lone assault on the fleeing Meitei king’s boat, with no guarantee of survival, shows his personal courage and devotion to duty. In Manipuri cultural memory, he represents the ideal warrior, unafraid of death, unwavering in resolve, and driven by honor.

His actions contrast with the strategic caution of other characters in the Thawanthābā Hiran, showing individual heroism against the backdrop of political betrayal and warfare.

== Legacy ==
Though his life ended in battle, Kwākpā Litonpānba’s name lives on as a symbol of Khuman military valor. His dramatic final act is frequently recounted in traditional storytelling, theater performances, and scholarly discussions of ancient Meitei literature. Replicas of the severed head of Khuman Kwakpa Litonpanba are traditionally installed on the sterns of many Hiyang Hiren boats.

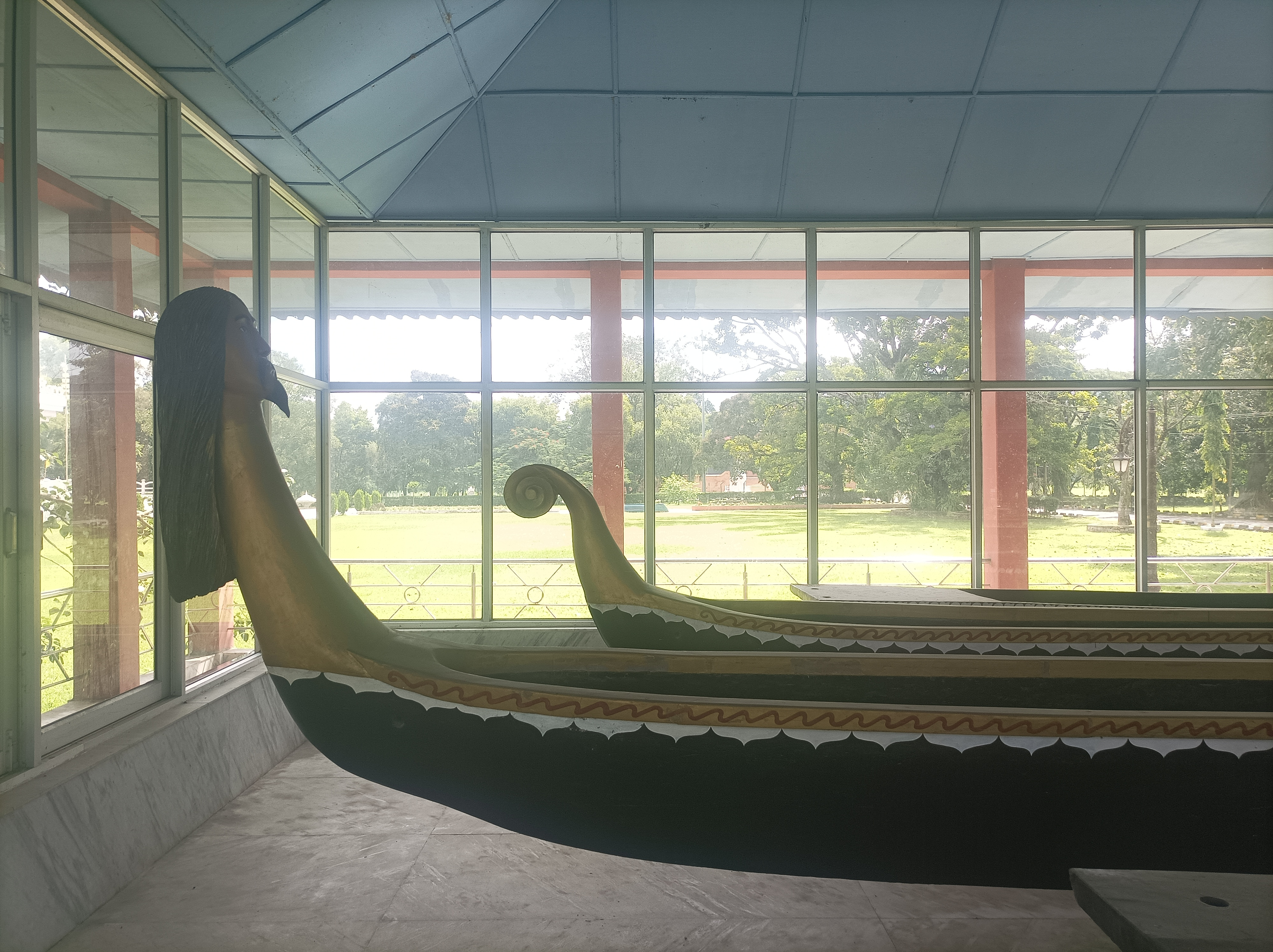
Replica of the beheaded head of Khuman Kwakpa Litonpanba being installed in the stern of the Meitei imperial dragon race boat (Hiyang Hiren), kept in the Kangla Fort, Imphal

== Gallery ==
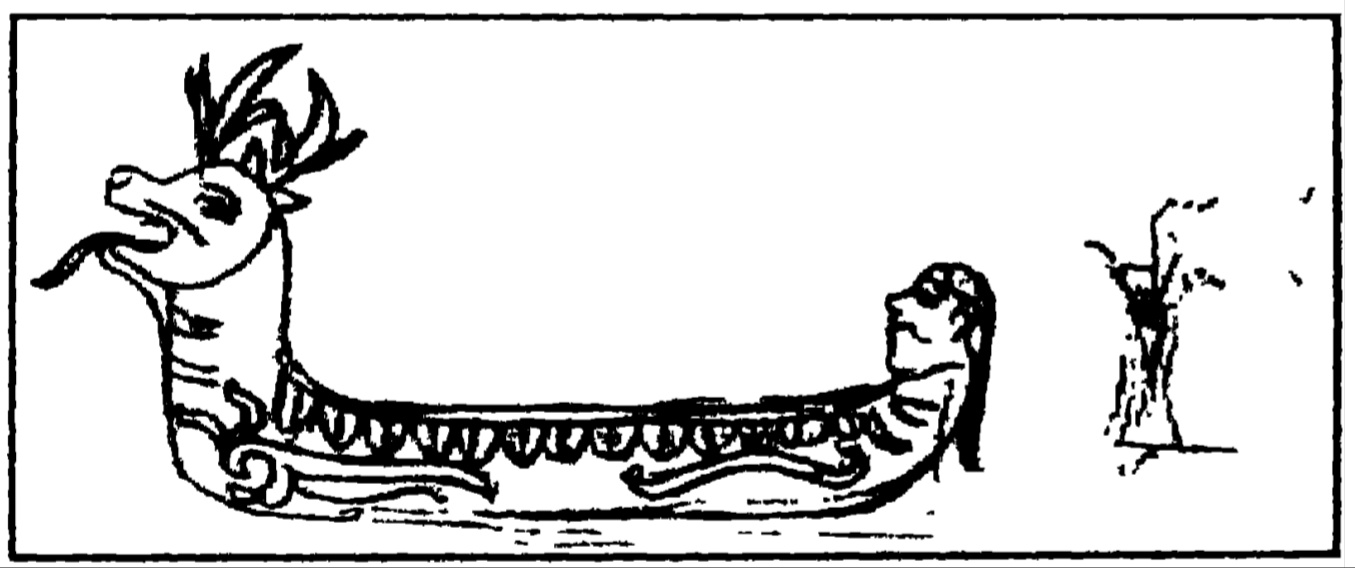

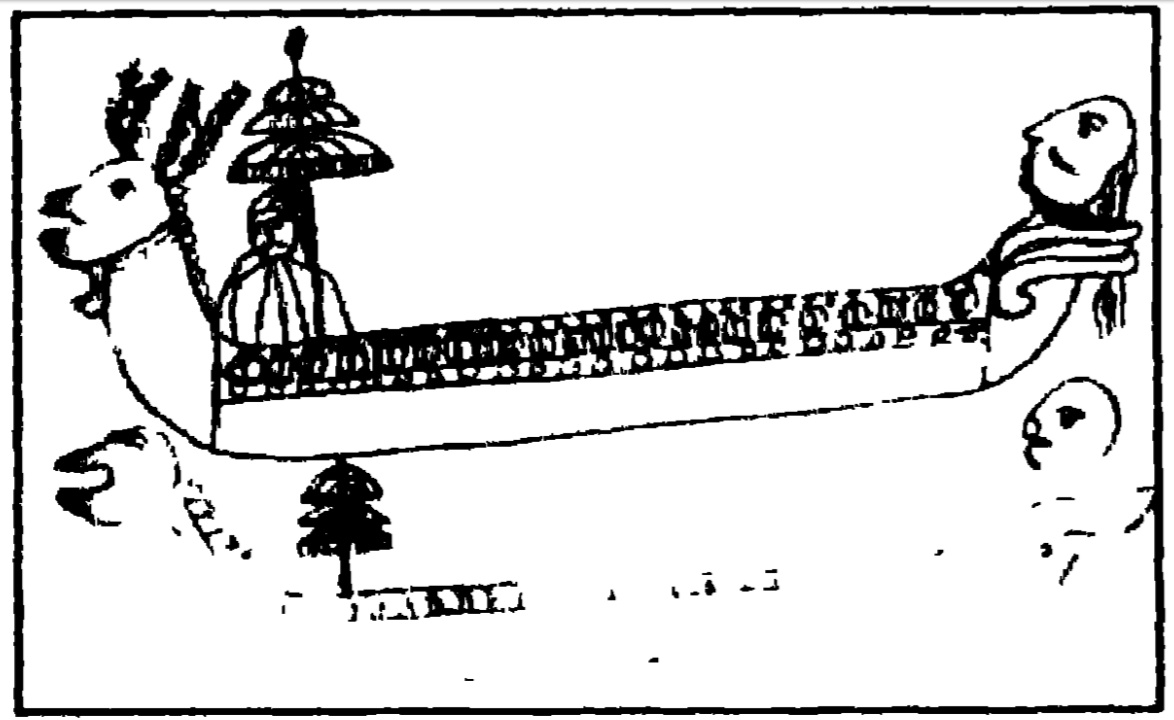

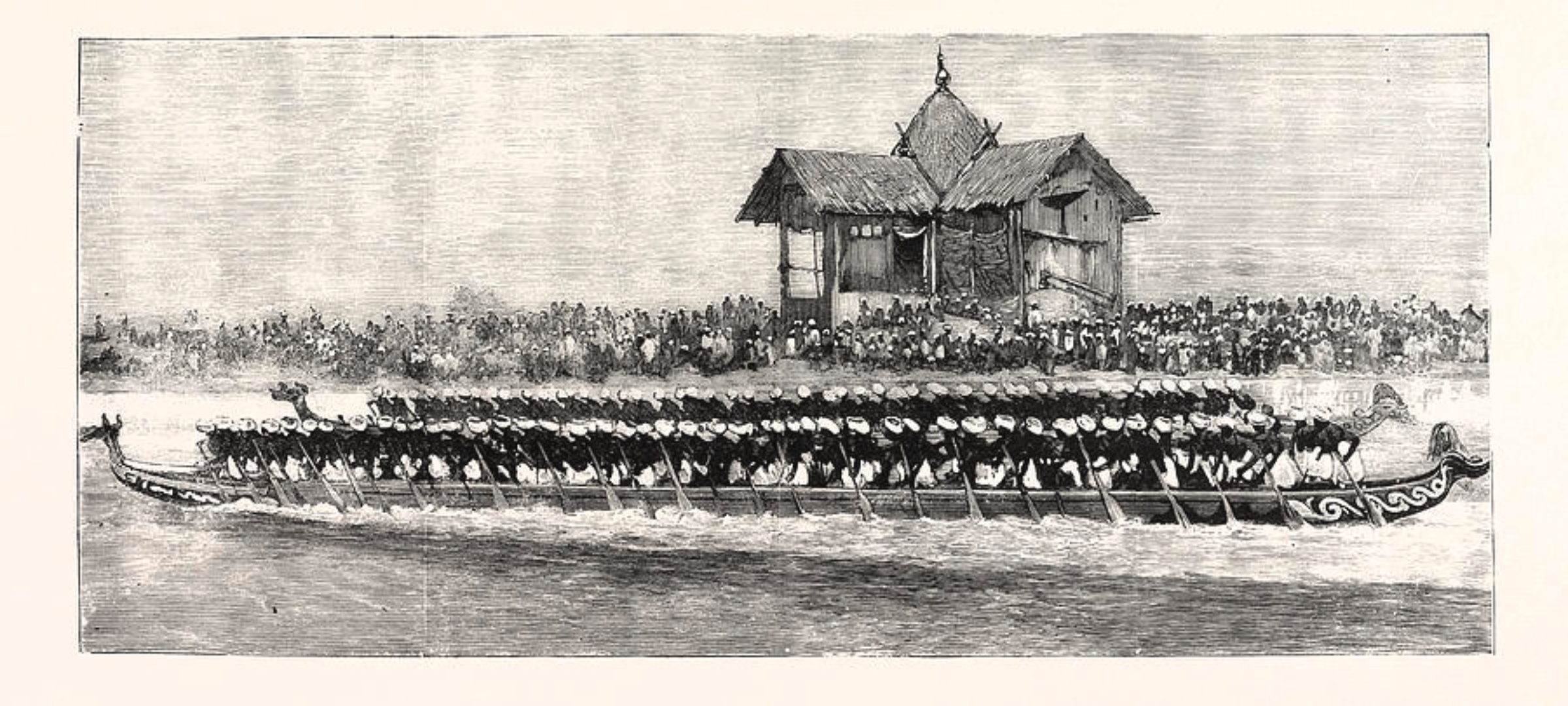

== See also ==
- Khuman dynasty
- Khuman Kangleirol
- Khumanlol
- Khuman language
- Lai Haraoba
- Hiyang Tannaba
- Khuman Maithingkongaba
- Thongbu Wainucha
- Chakha Moiremba
- Haoba Athouba
- Haokhong Sinaikhu
- Kangchin

== Bibliography ==
- Khelchandra Singh, Ningthoukhongjam (1980). Khuman Kangleirol (in Manipuri). India: Digital Library of India; Internet Archive.
- Kullachandra Sharma, B (1998). Khuman Ningthouron Lambuba (in Manipuri). India: Digital Library of India; Internet Archive.
- Ibobi, Laikhuram (1998). Khuman Kangleiron Amasung Laikhuram Shageigee Meihouron (in Manipuri). India: Digital Library of India; Internet Archive.
- Kullachandra, B. (1989-03-15). Khumal Ningthourol Lambuba (in Manipuri). India: Digital Library of India; Internet Archive.
