= Khuman dialect =

Historical dialectal variety of the Meitei language

Khuman
- Khumal, Khumanlon, Khumanlol, Khumallon, Khumallol
- ꯈꯨꯃꯟ
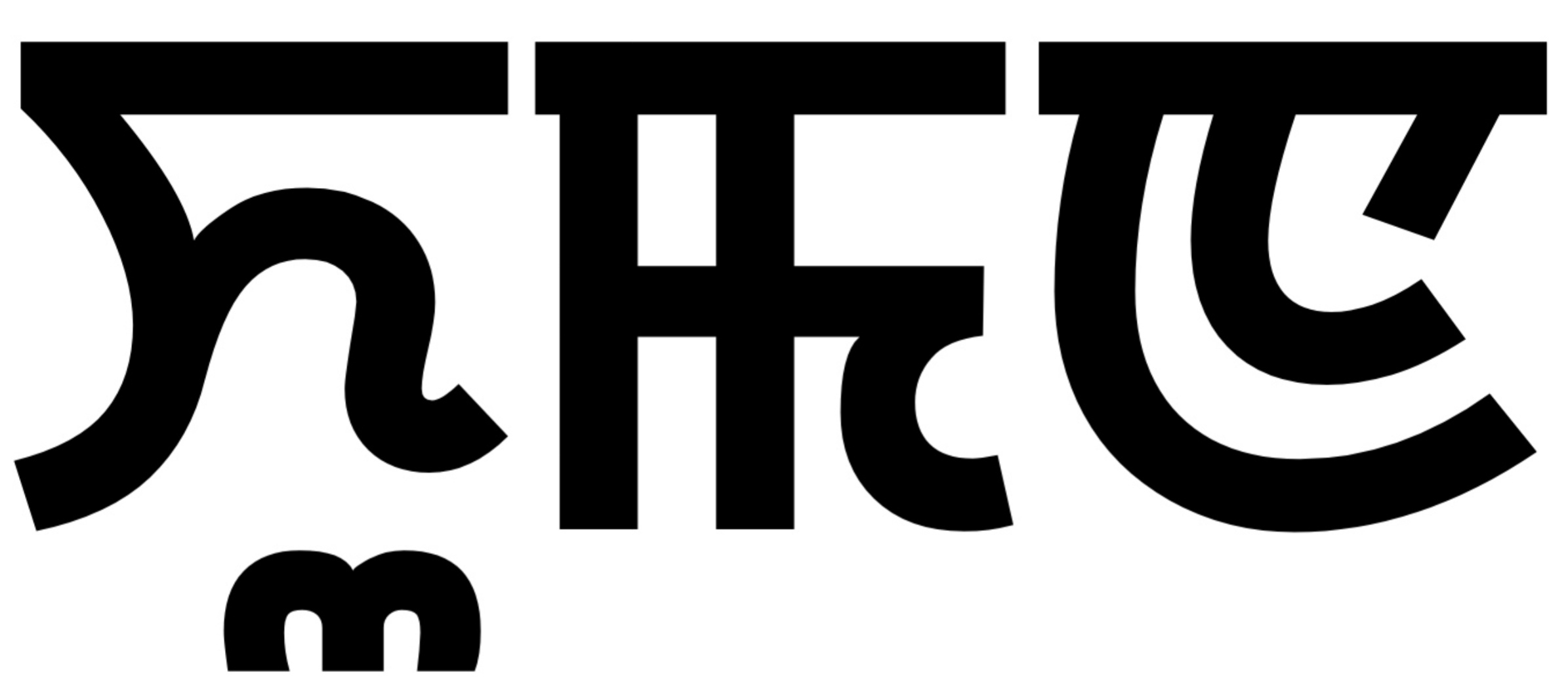
- Classical Meetei Mayek transliteration of "Khuman"
- Region: Khuman kingdom
- Ethnicity: Khuman (Meitei people)
- Extinct: merged into general Meitei language
- Language family: Sino-Tibetan: Tibeto-Burman; Meitei; Khuman
- Writing system: Meetei Mayek

Official status
- Official language in: Khuman kingdom
- Development body: Khuman dynasty

Language codes
- ISO 639-3: –

Khuman (ꯈꯨꯃꯟ) or Khumal (ꯈꯨꯃꯜ) is a historical dialectal variety of the Meitei language (also known as Manipuri) associated with the Khuman dynasty and its Khuman clan, one of the seven principal Yek Salai clans of the traditional Meitei confederacy. Historically influential in the Khuman kingdom, the Khuman dialect has contributed a distinct lexical layer to Meitei, with words of Khuman origin frequently attested in classical Meitei manuscripts and early literary sources. These features have drawn sustained attention from linguists, particularly within Tibeto-Burman studies, where Khuman data are examined for insights into the historical development, internal variation, and clan-based stratification of the Meitei language.

The independent Khuman political identity came to an end during the reign of Lamyai Kaikhinba (c. 1330–1400 CE), the last king of the Khuman dynasty. With the assimilation of the Khuman kingdom into the broader Meitei confederacy under the leadership of the Ningthouja dynasty, Khuman ceased to exist as a separate polity. This political integration played a significant role in shaping the linguistic landscape of early Meitei society, facilitating the incorporation of Khuman linguistic features into the developing Meitei language and its classical literary tradition.

== Vocabularies ==
Khuman words	Latin transliterations	Equivalents in another variant/dialect of Meitei language	Latin transliterations	English translation	Note(s)
ꯇꯔꯪ	tarang	ꯂꯥꯏꯖ	laija	water	it is often collectively said as tarang laija, in which laija is originated from Moirang (linguistics) speech, as a part of semantic reduplication in Meitei vocabulary
ꯅꯦꯝꯕꯤ	nembi	ꯁꯤꯡꯅꯥꯡ	singnang	grass	it is often collectively said as nembi singnang, in which singnang is originated from Ningthouja speech, as a part of semantic reduplication in Meitei vocabulary
ꯀꯩ	kei	ꯄꯥꯝꯕ	pamba	tiger	it is often collectively said as pamba kei, where pamba is originated from Ningthouja speech, as a part of semantic reduplication in Meitei vocabulary
ꯇꯧꯇꯦꯛ	toutek	ꯅꯧ	nou	oar	it is often collectively said as toutek nou, where nou is originated from Ningthouja speech, as a part of semantic reduplication in Meitei vocabulary

=== Comparison with Modern Meitei equivalents ===
Khuman vocabulary comparison
Word from Pre-20th Century Manuscripts, predominantly used by the Khumans	Modern Meitei Word	English Gloss
soypay	yenba	cock
yakon	səŋgay	house
kon	pat	lake
ya	kəŋphal	land
tawtek	nəw	oar

== Literary sources ==
- Khelchandra Singh, Ningthoukhongjam (1980). Khuman Kangleirol (in Manipuri). India: Digital Library of India; Internet Archive.
- Kullachandra Sharma, B (1998). Khuman Ningthouron Lambuba (in Manipuri). India: Digital Library of India; Internet Archive.
- Ibobi, Laikhuram (1998). Khuman Kangleiron Amasung Laikhuram Shageigee Meihouron (in Manipuri). India: Digital Library of India; Internet Archive.
- Kullachandra, B. (1989-03-15). Khumal Ningthourol Lambuba (in Manipuri). India: Digital Library of India; Internet Archive.

== See also ==
- Khuman Kangleirol
- Moirang Kangleirol
- Khuman Apokpa
- List of Khuman and Luwang common ancestral monarchs
- Mangang Luwang Khuman
- List of Khuman kings
- List of Khuman queens
- Khuman royal necklace incident
- Khuman Khamba
