= Khuman Kangleirol =

The Khuman Kangleirol (Meitei: ꯈꯨꯃꯟ ꯀꯪꯂꯩꯔꯣꯜ), also spelt as the Khuman Kangleiron (Meitei: ꯈꯨꯃꯟ ꯀꯪꯂꯩꯔꯣꯟ), is a classical Meitei language literary text of the Khuman dynasty of the Khuman kingdom. It is one of the most important historical documents of the history of ancient Kangleipak (early Manipur). It was produced during the reign of Meitei King Chit Sai (1748-1752 CE) of the Ningthouja dynasty. It gives the information on the genealogy of the rulers of the Khuman dynasty. The Khuman kingdom was once more prosperous than the Ningthouja principality. But, by the 12th century CE, it gradually declined. By the reign of Meitei king Kongyamba (1324-1335 CE) in the early 14th century CE, the Khuman territory was merged into that of the Ningthouja kingdom.

== Overview ==
The Khuman Kangleiron is a historical chronicle of the Khuman clan, a group that once held power in the southern area of the valley near the Meitei territory. Although it describes events from earlier times, the text was written much later, around the middle of the 18th century.

== Background and authorship ==
The chronicle was written during the rule of Chit Sai, the third son of Maharaj Garibniwaj (also known as Pamheiba), who became Meitei king of the Ningthouja dynasty, with a Khuman princess as his queen. It was the former king, Maharaj Garibniwaj, who wished to document the history of the once powerful Khuman dynasty. He asked Keibiram, a loyal minister and a descendant of the Khuman family, to write the chronicle.

== Nature and style ==
Unlike other historical records such as the Cheitharol Kumbaba, the Khuman Kangleiron does not follow a chronological order of events. It also does not focus on social, economic, religious, or political developments. It is also different from the Ningthourol Lambuba, which emphasizes the military achievements of kings.

Instead, the Khuman Kangleiron lists the names of successive Khuman kings. It includes short stories and deep details about how their titles were given. The chronicle also gives background stories of place-names and always begins each king’s story with the name of the queen who gave birth to him. These queen names come with explanations of how they were chosen.

== Mythical and historical kings ==
The chronicle starts with mythical kings, listing ten generations. The fifth king in the line of historical rulers, Adon Kacheng Wayeng Mangpa, was a contemporary of the Meitei king Pengsiba, who ruled from 379 to 498 CE.

=== Story of Thongpu Shamuknucha ===
One story in the chronicle is about the 21st Khuman king, Thongpu Shamuknucha. His mother was known as Nongballon Kainoupi Sam-yok. According to the Selloi-Langmai people, the words "khing khing" refer to hair and "kainou" to a hair bun. The queen's well-kept hair, wrapped in soft cloth, made her famous across the hills.

Her son was called Adon Thongpu Shamuknucha. This name is connected to an old story. When Chingkhong Poireiton came from the underworld to Earth, a cow led him and his followers by opening the door to the passage. The cow had many calves, and the Khuman king built a strong fence to raise them. Because of this, he earned the name Nongyai Thongpu Shamuknucha.

Later, this king led a military expedition into Konyang, a region in the southwest. His army burned houses and defeated the resistance, including the wife of the local chief, Haonu Tomson Langmeinu. After this victory, the king was also called Thongpu Shamuknucha, vanquisher of Haonu Tomson Langmeinu Shantongainubi. The chronicle claims the king truly deserved his name.

== Relations with other clans ==
The chronicle refers to conflicts between the Khumans and the Moirangs, mentioning bloody battles. However, it avoids discussing any hostile relationship between the Khumans and the Meiteis (Ningthoujas), even though such conflicts existed in earlier history.

== Decline of the Khuman dynasty ==
The chronicle does not go beyond the early 14th century. By that time, the Khuman society and political system were no longer strong. The Khumans eventually joined the Meitei society, through Meitei confederacy led by the Ningthouja rulers.

== Language and style ==
The writing style of the Khuman Kangleiron is mostly poetic but simpler than that found in texts like the Ningthourol Lambuba or the Chada Laihui. The language is not entirely old-fashioned and lacks Indo-Aryan vocabulary. Some references in the chronicle are unclear or difficult to trace.

== See also ==
- Khuman Apokpa
- Khumanlol
- Khuman royal necklace incident
- Khuman martial traditions
- List of Khuman and Luwang common ancestral monarchs
- List of Khuman kings
- List of Khuman queens
- Moirang Kangleirol

== Bibliography ==
- Khelchandra Singh, Ningthoukhongjam (1980). Khuman Kangleirol (in Manipuri). India: Digital Library of India; Internet Archive.
- Kullachandra Sharma, B (1998). Khuman Ningthouron Lambuba (in Manipuri). India: Digital Library of India; Internet Archive.
- Ibobi, Laikhuram (1998). Khuman Kangleiron Amasung Laikhuram Shageigee Meihouron (in Manipuri). India: Digital Library of India; Internet Archive.
- Kullachandra, B. (1989-03-15). Khumal Ningthourol Lambuba (in Manipuri). India: Digital Library of India; Internet Archive.
