= Khuman royal necklace incident =

The incident of Khuman royal necklace (Liklang) was a conflict within the royal family of the Khuman kingdom during the reign of King Yoithongai (Yoithongngai), who ruled from about 760 C.E. to 800 C.E. The incident involved his three sons and led to violence, exile, and a change in the royal succession.

== Historical context ==
The incident took place in the Khuman kingdom under King Yoithongai of the Khuman dynasty. After his reign, the Khuman throne was later held by his youngest son Haoramton, who ruled from about 800 C.E. to 830 C.E.

The royal family possessed a valuable and important necklace, which became the central cause of the conflict.

== Origin of the necklace ==
According to tradition, the necklace was found hanging from a tree in a forest. In one version, King Yoithongai himself discovered it while hunting and drinking water in the woods. In another version, the royal priest Thoiba brought the necklace to the king after seeing it in the forest.

The necklace was given to Queen Nganurol Kaireima and later became associated with the royal heirs.

== Royal brothers ==
King Yoithongai and Queen Nganurol Kaireima had three sons:

- Haoramhal (Haoramhan) – the eldest son
- Haoramyaima – the middle son
- Haoramton (Haoramtol) – the youngest son

Their names reflect birth order in the Meitei language:

- -hal / -han means eldest
- -yaima means middle
- -ton / -tol means youngest

The parents decided that the necklace would be worn by each son in rotation, changing from one son to another day by day.

== Invitation to the Luwang kingdom ==
The king of the Luwang dynasty invited the Khuman royal family to a feast held for the inauguration of a newly built palace. Haoramhal and Haoramyaima wished to attend the event wearing their finest clothing.

On that day, the necklace was assigned to Haoramton. Haoramton was away from home at the time. Haoramhal asked his mother to allow him to wear the necklace for the occasion. At first, she refused. Haoramhal then offered to give his future turn to Haoramton in exchange for wearing it that day. The queen agreed.

Haoramhal wore the necklace and traveled with Haoramyaima to the Luwang Kingdom.

== Violent confrontation ==
After learning that the necklace had been worn by his elder brother, Haoramton became angry. He waited for his brothers on their return journey, hiding along the road and carrying a royal sword.

When Haoramhal and Haoramyaima returned, Haoramton launched a sudden attack. He killed Haoramhal, taking the necklace from his neck using the sword.

== Immediate consequences ==
The attack caused deep fear and division within the royal family:

- Haoramhal was assassinated
- Haoramyaima, fearing that he might be attacked next, fled the Khuman kingdom
  - Haoramyaima took refuge in the Moirang kingdom, where he later pledged loyalty to the Moirang king

== Political outcome ==
After the incident and the departure of Haoramyaima, Haoramton later ascended the Khuman throne. His reign lasted from about 800 C.E. to 830 C.E., continuing the Khuman dynasty.

Haoramyaima’s exile led to the establishment of a Khuman royal lineage within the Moirang kingdom through his descendants.

== Legacy ==
The Khuman royal necklace incident is significant because it marked a violent conflict between royal brothers. The incident caused the self exile of a Khuman prince to Moirang, thereby influencing the succession of the Khuman throne, and creating the lasting political and genealogical links between the Khuman and Moirang kingdoms. The incident remains an important episode in Khuman and Moirang traditional history.

== Family tree chart ==
King Yoithongai (King)	Queen Nganurol Kaireima (Queen)
Haoramhal (Eldest son)	Haoramyaima (Middle son)	Haoramton (Youngest son / Future King)	Queen Nganuron Khongaiba Chanu (Queen)
Thoidingjam family	Yanglem family	Parenkoiba	Menshomba (Future King)	Athing Mongbisu	Thongbu Sanamba	Liklai Thawaa
Puremba	Ngangkha Leima	Mongbijam family	Langdam family & Ngangbam family	Hawaijam, Akangjam, & Pallubam families
Khamba

== See also ==
- Khuman Apokpa
- Khuman Kangleirol
- Moirang Kangleirol
- Khumanlol
- List of Khuman and Luwang common ancestral monarchs
- List of Khuman kings
- List of Khuman queens

== Bibliography ==
- Hodson, Thomas Callan. The Meitheis. India: D. Nutt, 1908.
- Gouramani, Kabrambam (1963-02-25). Khamba Thoibi Ahanba Saruk (in Manipuri). Manipur University Library, Imphal; North Eastern States Libraries. India: Digital Library of India; Internet Archive.
- Bormani, Sarangthem (2003). Moirang Shaion (in Manipuri). Manipur University Library, Imphal; North Eastern States Libraries. India: Digital Library of India; Internet Archive.
