= Chainarol =

Ancient Meitei language text

- Original title: Chainalol
- Language: Meitei language
- Genre: Meitei literature
- Publication place: Ancient Kangleipak

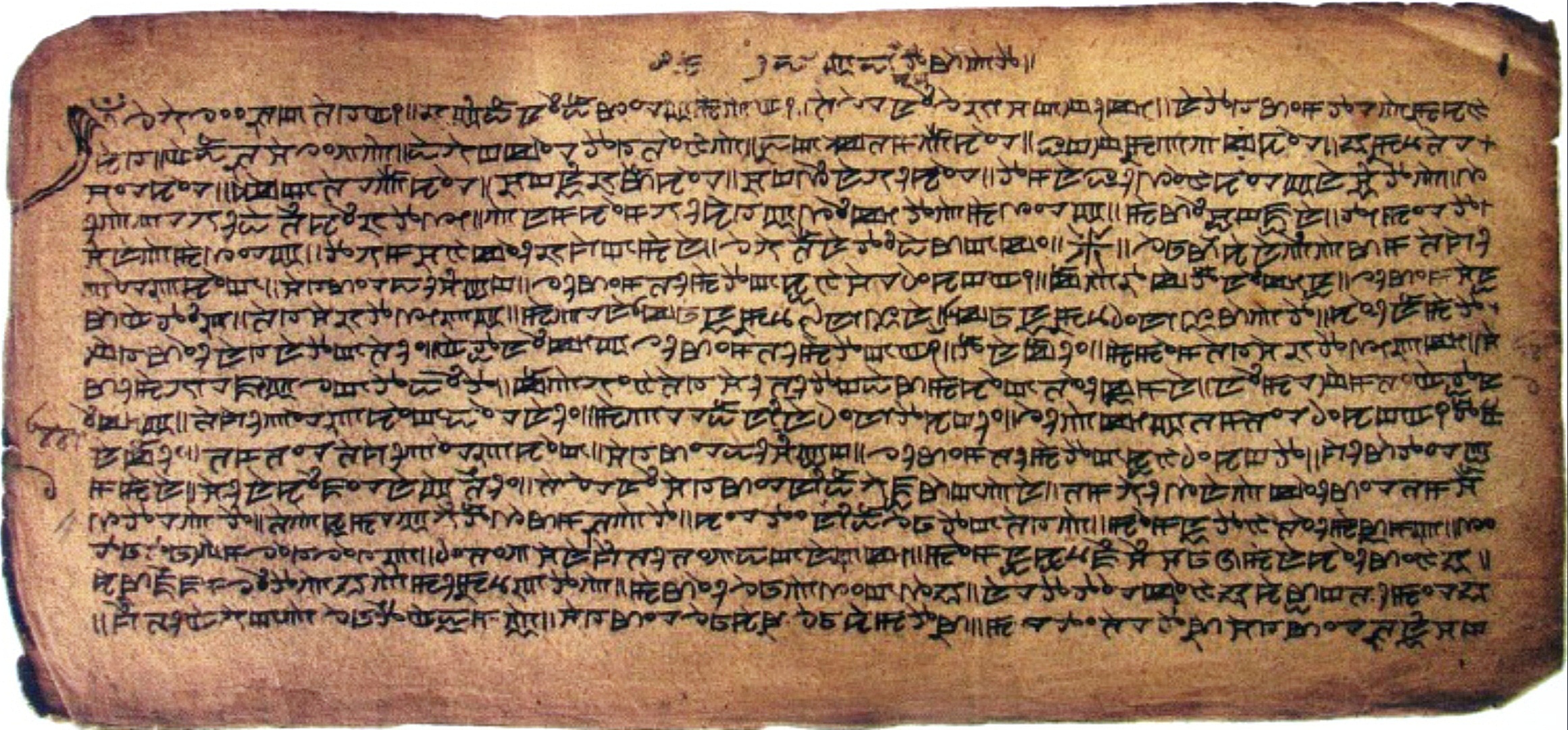

The Chainarol, also known as the Chainalol (literally, "Way of the warrior"), is an ancient Meitei language text (puya) which records the armed combats of various gladiators through different periods of history of Ancient Kangleipak. It consists of 27 stories of real life incidents of the dual fight between different gladiators.

== Introduction ==
The author of the text expresses his desire to sing in plaintive notes of the fights that took place between those dauntless people who could never be awed by evil portents of nature nor be repulsed by objects of formidable danger.

== Story ==
=== First story ===
The first story in the text is about the story of Yaiphurakpa, king of Chairen, and Haotak Laiba, the Khende king, whose wife once entertained the former with plenty of drinks and rich dishes during a hunting sport. In gratitude Yaiphurakpã threw the following year a lavish feast, but this caused a great jealousy in the Khende king. And he charged his friend of enjoying favours of his wife which the latter strongly denied. The first, however, insisted on settling the matter through a single combat in archery for divine dispensation and for which selection of a site known as Lawai Ponbikhok Chäiren Theichang Poong was agreed upon. When Häotak Laiba, the Khende king, first discharged his arrow with full force in the name of heaven and earth it went wide of the mark and fell headlong on the marshy grass, but in the turn of Yaiphūrākpā, the Chairen king, his arrow went straight and hit the Khende king in the thigh. When he was about to claim the Khende king's head, the earlier bond of friendship suddenly held him back. The two came back smiling and taking the incident in a sporting manner reconciled over a hearty drink.

== Analysis ==
The Chainarol mentions again and again the tradition of bellicosity among the clan dynasties of the Meitei people. In accordance with the text, fighting is mainly for the sake of it though honour may be attributed to as the primary motive with occasional gain of the respective communities to which the combatant belongs. The height of the glorification of individual valour and unrestrained admiration for physical prowess and martial skill are given in all their vividness. The combatants are like Kilkeny cats out to destroy each other and in some way bear the traits of the Roman gladiators. But they outdo the latter in one respect: the victor invariably claiming the head of the vanquished. In short, to wager life was the fond pastime of these valiant souls. So the stories rather seem to be closer to the Sagas of Icelanders.

== Bibliography ==
- https://archive.org/details/in.ernet.dli.2015.465362
