= List of Khuman kings =

Genealogical order of ancient kings

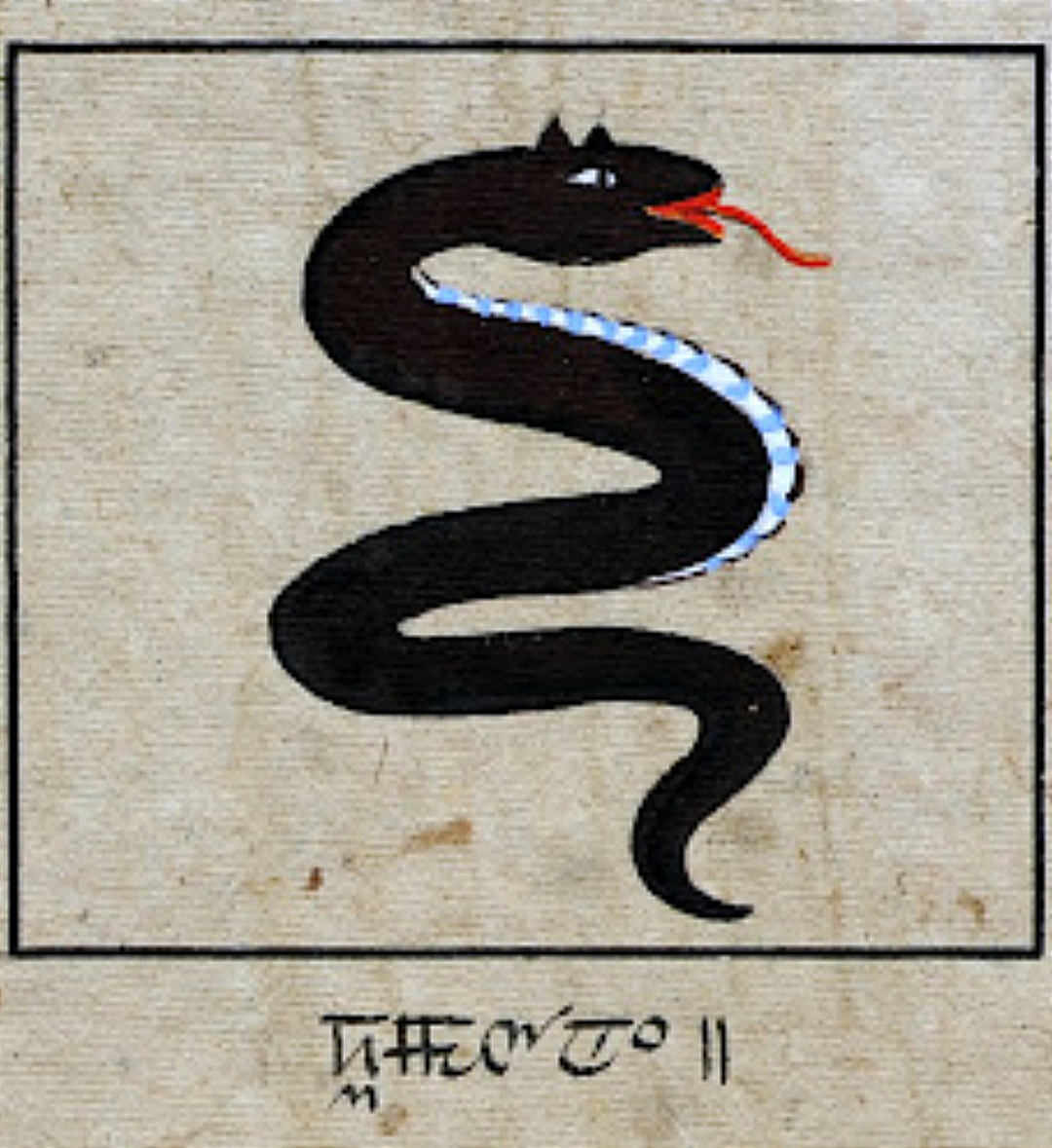
Classical Meitei illuminated manuscript painting, depicting a “Paphal” of a totemic Meitei dragon of the Khumans, from the “Pakhangba Lambuba”, an ancient Meitei language text

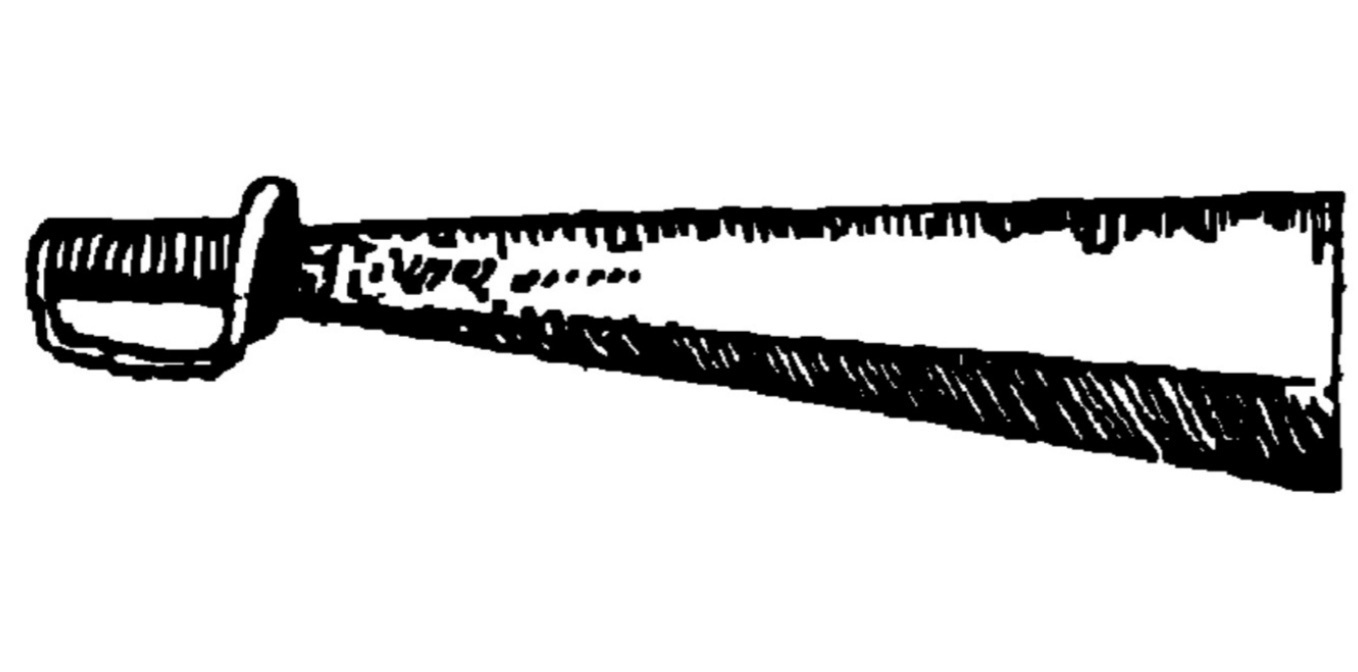
Khuman dynasty emblematic sword, which is one of the key Meitei traditional weapons

The list of Khuman monarchs outlines the lineage of rulers from the Khuman dynasty, one of the prominent ruling groups in ancient Kangleipak (early Manipur). The Khuman dynasty played a significant role in the early history of the region, particularly before the emergence of a unified Meitei kingdom, through Meitei confederacy. This list traces the succession of Khuman kings, highlighting their contributions to the cultural and political landscape of early Manipur.

== List ==
According to the royal chronicle Khuman Kangleirol, there were 32 kings in the independent Khuman dynasty. If 9 earlier kings from the shared Khuman-Luwang ancestral line are included, the total becomes 41. If King Thawaren, the brother of King Poireiton, is also added, the total becomes 42.

=== Common ancestry with the Luwang dynasty ===
The Khuman-Luwang common royal lineage comprises nine principal rulers: Nongdamlen Akhuba, Nongdamlen Ahanba, Kurumlen Meinaidaba, Kurumlen Meinaiba, Pothang Ponghan, Heironglen Longjumba, Heirong-ngang Thanganglen, Poireiton, and Singdangpung Tabung Singminnaba. The total increases to ten if Thawaren, the brother of Poireiton, is included.

Singtangpung Tapung Singminnapa, the ninth and final ruler of the undivided Khuman-Luwang common ancestral royal line, had two sons. His elder son, King Aalong, established the independent Khuman dynasty, while his younger son, King Pamingnapa, founded the separate Luwang dynasty.

=== Independent Khuman dynasty ===
Ancient Meitei name(s)	Latin transliteration	Alternative spelling(s) (if any)	Latin transliteration	Modernized Meitei name(s)	Latin transliteration	Alternative spelling(s) (if any)	Latin transliteration	Note(s)
ꯑꯥꯂꯣꯡ	Aalong			ꯑꯥꯔꯣꯡ	Aarong			First ruler of the independent Khuman dynasty; brother of King Pamingnapa, the founder of the independent Luwang dynasty; son of King Singminnapa, the last ruler of the Khuman-Luwang common royal lineage; grandson of Poireiton; contemporary of Meitei King Khuiyoi Tompok of the Ningthouja dynasty
ꯇꯨꯃꯥꯄ	Tumaapa	ꯇꯨꯃꯥꯄꯥ	Tumapa	ꯇꯨꯃꯥꯕ	Tumaaba	ꯇꯨꯃꯥꯕꯥ	Tumaba	Second ruler of the independent Khuman dynasty; contemporary of Meitei king Khuiyoi Tompok
ꯅꯣꯡꯇꯝꯂꯦꯟ ꯑꯈꯨꯄ ꯲ / ꯅꯣꯡꯇꯝꯂꯦꯟ ꯑꯈꯨꯄꯥ ꯲	Nongtamlen Akhupa II	ꯅꯣꯡꯇꯝꯂꯦꯜ ꯑꯈꯨꯄ ꯲ / ꯅꯣꯡꯇꯝꯂꯦꯜ ꯑꯈꯨꯄꯥ ꯲	Nongtamlel Akhupa II	ꯅꯣꯡꯗꯝꯂꯦꯟ ꯑꯈꯨꯕ ꯲ / ꯅꯣꯡꯗꯝꯂꯦꯟ ꯑꯈꯨꯕꯥ ꯲	Nongdamlen Akhuba II	ꯅꯣꯡꯗꯝꯂꯦꯜ ꯑꯈꯨꯕ ꯲ / ꯅꯣꯡꯗꯝꯂꯦꯜ ꯑꯈꯨꯕꯥ ꯲	Nongdamlel Akhuba II	Third ruler of the independent Khuman dynasty; contemporary of Taothingmang
ꯅꯣꯡꯇꯝꯂꯦꯟ ꯑꯍꯟꯄ / ꯅꯣꯡꯇꯝꯂꯦꯟ ꯑꯍꯟꯄꯥ	Nongtamlen Ahanpa	ꯅꯣꯡꯇꯝꯂꯦꯜ ꯑꯍꯟꯄ / ꯅꯣꯡꯇꯝꯂꯦꯜ ꯑꯍꯟꯄꯥ	Nongtamlel Ahanpa	ꯅꯣꯡꯗꯝꯂꯦꯟ ꯑꯍꯟꯕ / ꯅꯣꯡꯗꯝꯂꯦꯟ ꯑꯍꯟꯕꯥ	Nongdamlen Ahanba	ꯅꯣꯡꯗꯝꯂꯦꯜ ꯑꯍꯟꯕ / ꯅꯣꯡꯗꯝꯂꯦꯜ ꯑꯍꯟꯕꯥ	Nongdamlel Ahanba	Fourth ruler of the independent Khuman dynasty; contemporary of Meitei king Khui Ningomba
ꯃꯣꯏꯂꯥꯡꯄꯣꯛ ꯄꯨꯟꯁꯤꯄ	Moilangpok Punsipa / Moilangpok Punshipa	ꯃꯣꯏꯂꯥꯡꯄꯣꯛ ꯄꯨꯟꯁꯤꯄꯥ	Moilangpok Punsipa / Moilangpok Punshipa	ꯃꯣꯏꯔꯥꯡꯄꯣꯛ ꯄꯨꯟꯁꯤꯕ	Moirangpok Punsiba / Moirangpok Punshiba	ꯃꯣꯏꯔꯥꯡꯄꯣꯛ ꯄꯨꯟꯁꯤꯕꯥ	Moirangpok Punsiba / Moirangpok Punshiba	Fifth ruler of the independent Khuman dynasty; contemporary of Meitei king Pengshiba
ꯑꯇꯣꯟ ꯀꯆꯦꯡ ꯋꯥꯌꯦꯟꯄ	Aton Kacheng Waayenpa	ꯑꯇꯣꯟ ꯀꯆꯦꯡ ꯋꯥꯌꯦꯟꯄꯥ	Aton Kacheng Wayenpa	ꯑꯗꯣꯟ ꯀꯖꯦꯡ ꯋꯥꯌꯦꯟꯕ	Adon Kajeng Waayenba	ꯑꯗꯣꯟ ꯀꯖꯦꯡ ꯋꯥꯌꯦꯟꯕꯥ	Adon Kajeng Wayenba	Sixth ruler of the independent Khuman dynasty; contemporary of Meitei king Naokhamba
ꯑꯇꯣꯟ ꯅꯣꯡꯄ ꯈꯣꯝꯄ	Aton Nongpa Khompa	ꯑꯇꯣꯟ ꯅꯣꯡꯄꯥ ꯈꯣꯝꯄꯥ	Aton Nongpa Khompa	ꯑꯗꯣꯟ ꯅꯣꯡꯕ ꯈꯣꯝꯕ	Adon Nongba Khomba	ꯑꯗꯣꯟ ꯅꯣꯡꯕꯥ ꯈꯣꯝꯕꯥ	Adon Nongba Khomba	Seventh ruler of the independent Khuman dynasty; contemporary of Meitei king Naophangba
ꯈꯣꯝꯄ ꯅꯤꯡꯊꯧꯄ	Khompa Ningthoupa	ꯈꯣꯝꯄꯥ ꯅꯤꯡꯊꯧꯄꯥ	Khompa Ningthoupa	ꯈꯣꯝꯕ ꯅꯤꯡꯊꯧꯕ	Khomba Ningthouba	ꯈꯣꯝꯕꯥ ꯅꯤꯡꯊꯧꯕꯥ	Khomba Ningthouba	Eighth ruler of the independent Khuman dynasty; contemporary of Meitei king Sameirang
ꯂꯥꯏꯐꯪꯄ	Laiphangpa / Laifangpa	ꯂꯥꯏꯐꯪꯄꯥ	Laiphangpa / Laifangpa	ꯂꯥꯏꯐꯪꯕ	Laiphangba / Laifangba	ꯂꯥꯏꯐꯪꯕꯥ	Laiphangba / Laifangba	Ninth ruler of the independent Khuman dynasty; contemporary of Meitei king Ura Konthouba
ꯄꯨꯟꯁꯤ ꯌꯨꯃꯣꯏꯄ	Punsi Yumoipa / Punshi Yumoipa	ꯄꯨꯟꯁꯤ ꯌꯨꯃꯣꯏꯄꯥ	Punsi Yumoipa / Punshi Yumoipa	ꯄꯨꯟꯁꯤ ꯌꯨꯃꯣꯏꯕ	Punsi Yumoiba / Punshi Yumoiba	ꯄꯨꯟꯁꯤ ꯌꯨꯃꯣꯏꯕꯥ	Punsi Yumoiba / Punshi Yumoiba	Tenth ruler of the independent Khuman dynasty; contemporary of Meitei king Naothingkhong
ꯁꯦꯟꯄ ꯃꯤꯃꯥꯄ	Senpa Mimaapa / Shenpa Mimaapa	ꯁꯦꯟꯄꯥ ꯃꯤꯃꯥꯄꯥ	Senpa Mimapa / Shenpa Mimapa	ꯁꯦꯟꯕ ꯃꯤꯃꯥꯕ	Senba Mimaaba / Shenba Mimaaba	ꯁꯦꯟꯕꯥ ꯃꯤꯃꯥꯕꯥ	Senba Mimaba / Shenba Mimaba	Eleventh ruler of the independent Khuman dynasty; contemporary of Naothingkhong
ꯌꯣꯏꯊꯣꯡꯉꯥꯏ	Yoithong-ngai / Yoithongngai / Yoithongai			ꯌꯣꯏꯊꯣꯡꯉꯥꯏ	Yoithong-ngai / Yoithongngai / Yoithongai			Twelfth ruler of the independent Khuman dynasty; contemporary of Meitei kings, Khongtekcha and Keirencha
ꯍꯥꯎꯂꯝꯇꯣꯟ	Haulamton / Haolamton	ꯍꯥꯎꯂꯝꯇꯣꯜ	Haulamtol / Haolamtol	ꯍꯥꯎꯔꯝꯇꯣꯟ	Hauramton / Haoramton	ꯍꯥꯎꯔꯝꯇꯣꯜ	Hauramtol / Haoramtol	Thirteenth ruler of the independent Khuman dynasty; contemporary of Meitei king Yaraba
ꯃꯦꯟꯁꯣꯝꯄ	Mensompa / Menshompa	ꯃꯦꯟꯁꯣꯝꯄꯥ	Mensompa / Menshompa	ꯃꯦꯟꯁꯣꯝꯕ	Mensomba / Menshomba	ꯃꯦꯟꯁꯣꯝꯕꯥ	Mensomba / Menshomba	Fourteenth ruler of the independent Khuman dynasty; contemporary of Meitei king Ayangba
ꯊꯣꯡꯂꯩꯂꯣꯝ	Thongleilom			ꯊꯣꯡꯂꯩꯔꯣꯝ	Thongleirom			Fifteenth ruler of the independent Khuman dynasty; contemporary of Meitei king Ayangba
ꯆꯤꯡꯈꯣꯡ ꯊꯣꯡꯀꯂꯥꯏꯄ	Chingkhong Thongkalaipa	ꯆꯤꯡꯈꯣꯡ ꯊꯣꯡꯀꯂꯥꯏꯄꯥ	Chingkhong Thongkalaipa	ꯆꯤꯡꯈꯣꯡ ꯊꯣꯡꯒ꯭ꯔꯥꯏꯕꯥ	Chingkhong Thonggraiba	ꯆꯤꯡꯈꯣꯡ ꯊꯣꯡꯒ꯭ꯔꯥꯏꯕꯥ	Chingkhong Thonggraiba	Sixteenth ruler of the independent Khuman dynasty; contemporary of Meitei king Ningthou Cheng
ꯁꯤꯌꯥꯂꯣꯡ	Siyalong / Shiyalong			ꯁꯤꯌꯥꯔꯣꯡ	Siyarong / Shiyarong			Seventeenth ruler of the independent Khuman dynasty; contemporary of Meitei king Chenglei Ipan Lanthaba
ꯆꯦꯛꯌꯥꯝꯄ	Chek-yampa	ꯆꯦꯛꯌꯥꯝꯄꯥ	Chekyampa	ꯆꯦꯛꯌꯥꯝꯕ	Chek-yamba	ꯆꯦꯛꯌꯥꯝꯕꯥ	Chekyamba	Eighteenth ruler of the independent Khuman dynasty; contemporary of Meitei king Yanglou Keiphaba
ꯊꯤꯡꯀꯣꯟ ꯂꯤꯛꯃꯥꯄ	Thingkon Likmaapa	ꯊꯤꯡꯀꯣꯟ ꯂꯤꯛꯃꯥꯄꯥ	Thingkon Likmapa	ꯊꯤꯡꯀꯣꯟ ꯂꯤꯛꯃꯥꯕ	Thingkon Likmaaba	ꯊꯤꯡꯀꯣꯟ ꯂꯤꯛꯃꯥꯕꯥ	Thingkon Likmaba	Nineteenth ruler of the independent Khuman dynasty; contemporary of Meitei king Yanglou Keiphaba
ꯀꯣꯛꯄ, ꯈꯝꯂꯥꯡꯄ, ꯀꯥꯎꯄ ꯍꯤꯉꯝꯄ, ꯑꯃꯨꯇꯣꯟ	Kokpa, Khamlangpa, Kaopa Hingampa, Amuton	ꯀꯣꯛꯄꯥ, ꯈꯝꯂꯥꯡꯄꯥ, ꯀꯥꯎꯄꯥ ꯍꯤꯉꯝꯄꯥ, ꯑꯃꯨꯇꯣꯟ	Kokpa, Khamlangpa, Kaopa Hingampa, Amuton	ꯀꯣꯛꯄ, ꯈꯝꯂꯥꯡꯕ, ꯀꯥꯎꯕ ꯍꯤꯉꯝꯕ, ꯑꯃꯨꯗꯣꯟ	Kokpa, Khamlangba, Kaoba Hingamba, Amudon	ꯀꯣꯛꯄꯥ, ꯈꯝꯂꯥꯡꯕꯥ, ꯀꯥꯎꯕꯥ ꯍꯤꯉꯝꯕꯥ, ꯑꯃꯨꯗꯣꯟ	Kokpa, Khamlangba, Kaoba Hingamba, Amudon	Joint kingship or co-kingship or co-regency period; twentieth in lineage of the independent Khuman dynasty; contemporary of Meitei king Irengba
ꯑꯇꯣꯟ ꯌꯥꯏꯊꯤꯡꯄ ꯅꯨꯡꯅꯥꯡ ꯑꯁꯣꯟꯄ	Aton Yaithingpa Nungnang Asonpa	ꯑꯇꯣꯟ ꯌꯥꯏꯊꯤꯡꯄꯥ ꯅꯨꯡꯅꯥꯡ ꯑꯁꯣꯟꯄꯥ	Aton Yaithingpa Nungnang Ashonpa	ꯑꯗꯣꯟ ꯌꯥꯏꯊꯤꯡꯕ ꯅꯨꯡꯅꯥꯡ ꯑꯁꯣꯟꯕ	Adon Yaithingba Nungnang Asonba	ꯑꯗꯣꯟ ꯌꯥꯏꯊꯤꯡꯕꯥ ꯅꯨꯡꯅꯥꯡ ꯑꯁꯣꯟꯕꯥ	Adon Yaithingba Nungnang Ashonba	Twenty first ruler of the independent Khuman dynasty; contemporary of Meitei king Irengba
ꯁꯝꯌꯣꯛ ꯐꯥꯄ ꯌꯣꯡꯇꯥꯟ ꯊꯧꯄ	Samyok Phaapa Yongtaan Thoupa	ꯁꯝꯌꯣꯛ ꯐꯥꯄꯥ ꯌꯣꯡꯇꯥꯟ ꯊꯧꯄꯥ	Samyok Phapa Yongtan Thoupa	ꯁꯝꯌꯣꯛ ꯐꯥꯕ ꯌꯣꯡꯇꯥꯟ ꯊꯧꯕ	Samyok Phaaba Yongtaan Thouba	ꯁꯝꯌꯣꯛ ꯐꯥꯕꯥ ꯌꯣꯡꯇꯥꯟ ꯊꯧꯕꯥ	Samyok Phaba Yongtan Thouba	Twenty second ruler of the independent Khuman dynasty; contemporary of Meitei king Loiyumba
ꯊꯣꯡꯄꯨ ꯁꯃꯨꯛ ꯀꯣꯟꯊꯧꯄ	Thongpu Samuk Konthoupa	ꯊꯣꯡꯄꯨ ꯁꯃꯨꯛ ꯀꯣꯟꯊꯧꯄꯥ	Thongpu Shamuk Konthoupa	ꯊꯣꯡꯕꯨ ꯁꯃꯨꯛ ꯀꯣꯟꯊꯧꯕ	Thongbu Samuk Konthouba	ꯊꯣꯡꯕꯨ ꯁꯃꯨꯛ ꯀꯣꯟꯊꯧꯕꯥ	Thongbu Shamuk Konthouba	Twenty third ruler of the independent Khuman dynasty; contemporary of Meitei king Loitongba
ꯊꯤꯡꯀꯣꯜ ꯍꯟꯄ	Thingkol Hanpa	ꯊꯤꯡꯀꯣꯜ ꯍꯟꯄꯥ	Thingkol Hanpa	ꯊꯤꯡꯀꯣꯜ ꯍꯟꯕ	Thingkol Hanba	ꯊꯤꯡꯀꯣꯜ ꯍꯟꯕꯥ	Thingkol Hanba	Twenty fourth ruler of the independent Khuman dynasty; contemporary of Meitei king Loitongba
ꯈꯣꯡꯄꯨ ꯀꯣꯟꯊꯧꯄ	Khongpu Konthoupa	ꯈꯣꯡꯄꯨ ꯀꯣꯟꯊꯧꯄꯥ	Khongpu Konthoupa	ꯈꯣꯡꯕꯨ ꯀꯣꯟꯊꯧꯕ	Khongbu Konthouba	ꯈꯣꯡꯕꯨ ꯀꯣꯟꯊꯧꯕꯥ	Khongbu Konthouba	Twenty fifth ruler of the independent Khuman dynasty; contemporary of Meitei king Aton Yoiremba
ꯁꯦꯛꯄꯨ ꯀꯥꯏꯅꯧ ꯆꯤꯡꯁꯣꯝꯄ	Sekpu Kainou Chingsompa	ꯁꯦꯛꯄꯨ ꯀꯥꯏꯅꯧ ꯆꯤꯡꯁꯣꯝꯄꯥ	Shekpu Kainou Chingshompa	ꯁꯦꯛꯄꯨ ꯀꯥꯏꯅꯧ ꯆꯤꯡꯁꯣꯝꯕ	Sekpu Kainou Chingsomba	ꯁꯦꯛꯄꯨ ꯀꯥꯏꯅꯧ ꯆꯤꯡꯁꯣꯝꯕꯥ	Shekpu Kainou Chingshomba	Twenty sixth ruler of the independent Khuman dynasty; contemporary of Meitei king Iwan Thaba
ꯀꯥꯡꯆꯤꯡ ꯂꯩꯅꯥꯎꯇꯥꯄ	Kangching Leinaotaapa	ꯀꯥꯡꯆꯤꯡ ꯂꯩꯅꯥꯎꯇꯥꯄꯥ	Kangching Leinaotapa	ꯀꯥꯡꯆꯤꯡ ꯂꯩꯅꯥꯎꯇꯥꯕ	Kangching Leinaotaaba	ꯀꯥꯡꯆꯤꯡ ꯂꯩꯅꯥꯎꯇꯥꯕꯥ	Kangching Leinaotaba	Twenty seventh ruler of the independent Khuman dynasty; contemporary of Meitei king Iwan Thaba
ꯏꯀꯣꯞ ꯂꯥꯟꯊꯄ	Ikop Laanthapa / Ekop Laanthapa	ꯏꯀꯣꯞ ꯂꯥꯟꯊꯄꯥ	Ikop Lanthapa / Ekop Lanthapa	ꯏꯀꯣꯞ ꯂꯥꯟꯊꯕ	Ikop Laanthaba / Ekop Laanthaba	ꯏꯀꯣꯞ ꯂꯥꯟꯊꯕꯥ	Ikop Lanthaba / Ekop Lanthaba	Twenty eighth ruler of the independent Khuman dynasty; contemporary of Meitei king Thawanthaba
ꯄꯨꯟꯁꯤ ꯄꯨꯂꯦꯟꯍꯟꯄ	Punsi Pulenhanpa / Punshi Pulenhanpa	ꯄꯨꯟꯁꯤ ꯄꯨꯂꯦꯟꯍꯟꯄꯥ	Punsi Pulenhanpa / Punshi Pulenhanpa	ꯄꯨꯟꯁꯤ ꯄꯨꯔꯦꯟꯍꯟꯕ	Punsi Purenhanba / Punshi Purenhanba	ꯄꯨꯟꯁꯤ ꯄꯨꯔꯦꯟꯍꯟꯕꯥ	Punsi Purenhanba / Punshi Purenhanba	Twenty ninth ruler of the independent Khuman dynasty; contemporary of Meitei kings, Chingthang Laanthaba and Puranthaba
ꯆꯥꯂꯟꯄ	Chaalanpa	ꯆꯥꯂꯟꯄꯥ	Chalanpa	ꯆꯥꯔꯟꯕ	Chaaranba	ꯆꯥꯔꯟꯕꯥ	Charanba	Thirtieth ruler of the independent Khuman dynasty; contemporary of Meitei king Moramba
ꯌꯥꯎꯁꯨ ꯉꯝꯄ	Yausu Ngampa / Yaosu Ngampa	ꯌꯥꯎꯁꯨ ꯉꯝꯄꯥ	Yaushu Ngampa / Yaoshu Ngampa	ꯌꯥꯎꯁꯨ ꯉꯝꯕ	Yausu Ngamba / Yaosu Ngamba	ꯌꯥꯎꯁꯨ ꯉꯝꯕꯥ	Yaushu Ngamba / Yaoshu Ngamba	Thirty first ruler of the independent Khuman dynasty; contemporary of Meitei king Thangbi Lanthaba
ꯂꯝꯌꯥꯏ ꯀꯥꯏꯈꯤꯟꯄ	Lamyai Kaikhinpa	ꯂꯝꯌꯥꯏ ꯀꯥꯏꯈꯤꯟꯄꯥ	Lamyai Kaikhinpa	ꯂꯝꯌꯥꯏ ꯀꯥꯏꯈꯤꯟꯕ	Lamyai Kaikhinba	ꯂꯝꯌꯥꯏ ꯀꯥꯏꯈꯤꯟꯕꯥ	Lamyai Kaikhinba	Thirty second ruler of the independent Khuman dynasty; contemporary of Meitei king Kongyamba

== See also ==
- Poireiton Khunthok
- Nongda Lairen Pakhangba
- Meitei deities
- Mangang Luwang Khuman
- List of rulers of Moirang
- List of Manipuri kings
- Lai Haraoba
- List of Khuman queens

== Bibliography ==
- Yek Taretkee Ningthourol, by Sudhir, Angom
- Khuman Sheirol
- খুমন্ নিংথৌরোন লম্বুবা, by Brahmacharimayum Kulachandra Sharma
