= Khuman Pokpa =

- Ancestor God of the Khuman clan, God of the sunset and the night
- Member of Mangang Luwang Khuman
- Other names: Khuman Sidaba
- Affiliation: Khuman clan
- Major cult center: Mayang Imphal
- Predecessor: Pakhangba
- Color: Black
- Texts: Puyas
- Gender: Male
- Region: Mayang Imphal
- Ethnic group: Meitei
- Festivals: Lai Haraoba

Genealogy
- Parents: Pakhangba (father)
- Siblings: Mangang Apokpa, Luwang Apokpa

Equivalents
- Greek: Erebus
- Roman: Scotus

Khuman Pokpa (Meitei: ꯈꯨꯃꯟ ꯄꯣꯛꯄ or ꯈꯨꯃꯟ ꯑꯄꯣꯛꯄ, Khuman Apokpa) is the Apokpa, or ancestor god of the Khuman clan. He is regarded as the founder of the Khuman dynasty., and is one of the three members of the Mangang Luwang Khuman in Meitei mythology and religion. Khuman Popka represents the time of the sunset and the night.

== Etymology ==
The name "Khuman Pokpa" is made up of two words, "Khuman" and "Pokpa". In Meitei language (Manipuri language), "Pokpa" means "to beget (be the father of) or to give birth to". The word "Apokpa" comes from "Pokpa". Apokpas are the dead male members of a family for the last three generations. They can be the father, grandfather, or great grandfather of any living person, who looked after the family in the past. So, "Khuman Pokpa" or "Khuman Apokpa" means "The one who gave birth to the Khumans".

== Description ==
Meitei people worship fire in the fireplace called Phunga Mei (lit. hearth fire) at home. In the fireplace, people keep three stones. One stone is in the right west, another in the north east and another in the south east. This forms a triangle. These three stones represent the three significant times of day. The northeastern stone represents the Mangang. The southeastern stone represents the Luwang. The western stone represents the Khuman. Here, Khuman represents the time of the sunset and the night. The remaining Mangang and Luwang represent the sunrise and the noon respectively. The Meiteis addressed the hearth fire (phunga mei) as "Meitreng Arabana Yoimayai Mahut Sinna Mei". The English translation of this Meitei language (Manipuri language) passage is "The burning fire in the hearth place substitutes the Sun". Thus, the Sun is worshipped in the Meetei Phunga.

== Cults and pantheons ==
Among many, one of the most important pantheons of God Khuman Pokpa is in Mayang Imphal. Mayang Imphal is the ancient capital of the kingdom of the Khuman Salai.

== Worship ==
In ancient times, God Khuman Pokpa was worshipped for good health and prosperity. According to the beliefs of the fishermen of the Karang Islands, diseases with unexplainable causes are caused by gods and goddesses. According to their beliefs, the danger of natural calamities, epidemics, diseases and other miseries are all due to the anger of gods and goddesses. The reasons for their anger are usually due the negletct of rites and rituals.

== Festival ==
The religious festival of Lai Haraoba is celebrated in honor of Khuman Pokpa in the Karang Islands. The celebration lasts for ten consecutive days during the month of September. In the modern day, the celebration draws the attention of a large number of tourists.
