= Khuman kingdom =

Former kingdom in India

Khuman Leipaak (Meitei: ꯈꯨꯃꯟ ꯂꯩꯄꯥꯛ) (literally, "Khuman kingdom") was an independent powerful kingdom, ruled by the kings of the Khuman dynasty in Ancient Manipur. The principality flourished at the shores of the Loktak lake. Mayang Imphal, the capital city of the kingdom, was situated at the left banks of the Imphal River, until the middle of the 14th century AD. The Khuman kingdom was once more extensive and prosperous than that of the Ningthoujas. However, it became dependent on the Ningthouja kingdom by the 12th century AD.

== See also ==
- Khuman Khamba
- Khumanlol
- Khuman Pokpa
