= List of Khuman queens =

Ancient female rulers of Khuman dynasty

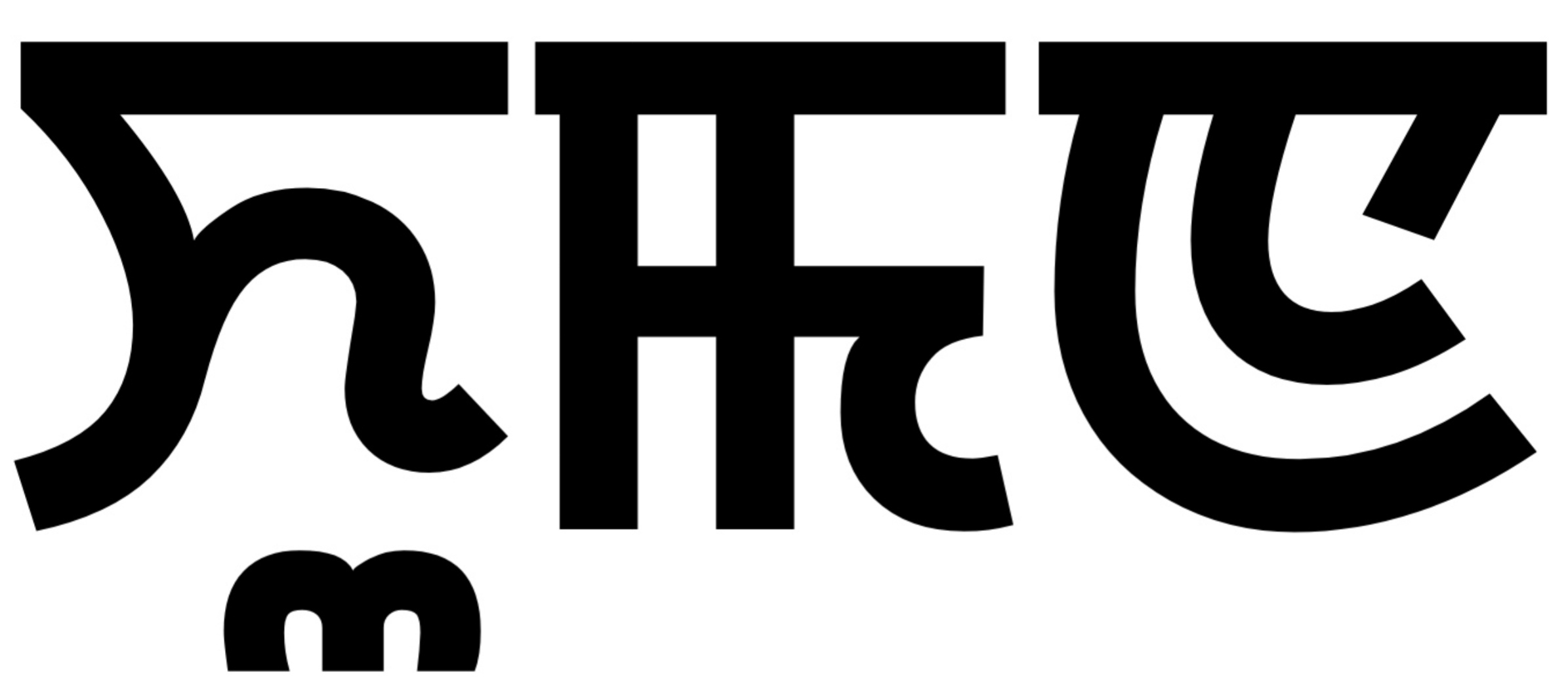
Classical Meitei transliteration of "Khuman"

The list of Khuman queens includes the names and identities of the royal consorts associated with the Khuman dynasty, a historical lineage in ancient Kangleipak (early Manipur). These figures are noted in royal chronicles and literary traditions, providing insights into dynastic alliances, succession, and the sociopolitical structure of the period. The documentation of these queens contributes to the broader understanding of the Khuman clan's role within the historical context of early Manipur.

== List ==
Ancient Meitei name(s)	Latin transliteration	Alternative spelling(s) (if any)	Latin transliteration	Modern(ized) Meitei name(s)	Latin transliteration	Alternative spelling(s) (if any)	Latin transliteration	Note(s)
ꯆꯤꯟꯐꯨꯂꯦꯟ ꯂꯩꯇꯪꯂꯦꯟ ꯆꯤꯟꯈꯨꯄꯤ	Chinphulen Leitanglen Chinkhupi	ꯆꯤꯟꯐꯨꯂꯦꯜ ꯂꯩꯇꯪꯂꯦꯜ ꯆꯤꯟꯈꯨꯄꯤ	Chinphulel Leitanglel Chinkhupi	ꯆꯤꯟꯐꯨꯔꯦꯟ ꯂꯩꯇꯪꯂꯦꯟ ꯆꯤꯟꯈꯨꯕꯤ	Chinphuren Leitanglen Chinkhubi	ꯆꯤꯟꯐꯨꯔꯦꯜ ꯂꯩꯇꯪꯂꯦꯜ ꯆꯤꯟꯈꯨꯕꯤ	Chinphurel Leitanglel Chinkhubi	Queen consort of Khuman King Aalong (Aarong)
ꯉꯥꯅꯨꯂꯣꯟ ꯊꯣꯡꯉꯥꯏꯄ ꯆꯅꯨ	Nganulon Thong-ngaipa Chanu	ꯉꯥꯅꯨꯂꯣꯜ ꯊꯣꯡꯉꯥꯏꯄ ꯆꯅꯨ	Nganulol Thong-ngaipa Chanu	ꯉꯥꯅꯨꯔꯣꯟ ꯊꯣꯡꯉꯥꯏꯕ ꯆꯅꯨ	Nganuron Thong-ngaiba Chanu	ꯉꯥꯅꯨꯔꯣꯜ ꯊꯣꯡꯉꯥꯏꯕ ꯆꯅꯨ	Nganurol Thong-ngaiba Chanu	Queen consort of Khuman King Tumaapa (Tumaaba)
ꯂꯩꯊꯝꯂꯦꯟ ꯆꯅꯨ	Leithamlen Chanu	ꯂꯩꯊꯝꯂꯦꯜ ꯆꯅꯨ	Leithamlel Chanu					Queen consort of Khuman King Nongtamlen Akhupa II (Nongdamlen Akhuba II)
ꯂꯩꯂꯨꯝ ꯂꯥꯡꯄꯤ	Leilum Langpi / Leiloom Laangpee			ꯂꯩꯔꯨꯝ ꯂꯥꯡꯕꯤ	Leirum Langbi / Leiroom Laangbee			Queen consort of Khuman King Ahanpa (Nongdamlen Ahanba)
ꯉꯥꯅꯨꯂꯣꯟ ꯌꯥꯏꯄꯤ ꯂꯩꯃ	Nganulon Yaipi Leima	ꯉꯥꯅꯨꯂꯣꯜ ꯌꯥꯏꯄꯤ ꯂꯩꯃ	Nganulol Yaipi Leima	ꯉꯥꯅꯨꯔꯣꯟ ꯌꯥꯏꯕꯤ ꯂꯩꯃ	Nganuron Yaibi Leima	ꯉꯥꯅꯨꯔꯣꯜ ꯌꯥꯏꯕꯤ ꯂꯩꯃ	Nganurol Yaibi Leima	Queen consort of Khuman King Moilangpok Punsipa (Moirangpok Punsiba)
ꯋꯥꯡꯉꯝꯂꯣꯟ ꯄꯦꯡꯁꯤꯄ ꯆꯅꯨ ꯂꯩꯂꯨꯝ ꯆꯦꯡꯄꯤ	Wang-ngamlon Pengsipa Chanu Leilum Chengpi	ꯋꯥꯡꯉꯝꯂꯣꯜ ꯄꯦꯡꯁꯤꯄ ꯆꯅꯨ ꯂꯩꯂꯨꯝ ꯆꯦꯡꯄꯤ	Wang-ngamlol Pengshipa Chanu Leiloom Chengpee	ꯋꯥꯡꯉꯝꯂꯣꯟ ꯄꯦꯡꯁꯤꯕ ꯆꯅꯨ ꯂꯩꯔꯨꯝ ꯆꯦꯡꯕꯤ	Wang-ngamlon Pengsiba Chanu Leirum Chengbi	ꯋꯥꯡꯉꯝꯂꯣꯜ ꯄꯦꯡꯁꯤꯕ ꯆꯅꯨ ꯂꯩꯔꯨꯝ ꯆꯦꯡꯕꯤ	Wang-ngamlol Pengshiba Chanu Leiroom Chengbee	Queen consort of Khuman King Aton Kacheng Waayenpa (Adon Kajeng Waayenba); Princess of the Ningthouja dynasty; Daughter of Meitei King Pengshiba
ꯋꯥꯡꯉꯝꯂꯣꯟ ꯅꯥꯎꯈꯝꯄ ꯆꯅꯨ ꯂꯩꯂꯨꯝ ꯂꯦꯝꯄꯤ	Wang-ngamlon Naokhampa Chanu Leilum Lempi	ꯋꯥꯡꯉꯝꯂꯣꯜ ꯅꯥꯎꯈꯝꯄꯥ ꯆꯅꯨ ꯂꯩꯂꯨꯝ ꯂꯦꯝꯄꯤ	Wang-ngamlol Naokhampa Chanu Leiloom Lempee	ꯋꯥꯡꯉꯝꯂꯣꯟ ꯅꯥꯎꯈꯝꯕ ꯆꯅꯨ ꯂꯩꯔꯨꯝ ꯂꯦꯝꯕꯤ	Wang-ngamlon Naokhamba Chanu Leirum Lembi	ꯋꯥꯡꯉꯝꯂꯣꯜ ꯅꯥꯎꯈꯝꯕꯥ ꯆꯅꯨ ꯂꯩꯔꯨꯝ ꯂꯦꯝꯕꯤ	Wang-ngamlol Naokhamba Chanu Leiroom Lembee	Queen consort of Khuman King Aton Nongpa Khompa (Adon Nongba Khomba); Princess of the Ningthouja dynasty; Daughter of Meitei King Naokhamba
ꯋꯥꯡꯉꯝꯂꯣꯟ ꯅꯥꯎꯐꯪꯄ ꯆꯅꯨ ꯂꯥꯏꯄꯤ	Wang-ngamlon Naophangpa Chanu Laipi	ꯋꯥꯡꯉꯝꯂꯣꯜ ꯅꯥꯎꯐꯪꯄꯥ ꯆꯅꯨ ꯂꯥꯏꯄꯤ	Wang-ngamlol Naofangpa Chanu Laipee	ꯋꯥꯡꯉꯝꯂꯣꯟ ꯅꯥꯎꯐꯪꯕ ꯆꯅꯨ ꯂꯥꯏꯕꯤ	Wang-ngamlon Naophangba Chanu Laibi	ꯋꯥꯡꯉꯝꯂꯣꯜ ꯅꯥꯎꯐꯪꯕꯥ ꯆꯅꯨ ꯂꯥꯏꯕꯤ	Wang-ngamlol Naofangba Chanu Laibee	Queen consort of Khuman King Khompa Ningthoupa (Khomba Ningthouba); Princess of the Ningthouja dynasty; Daughter of Meitei King Naophangba
ꯉꯥꯅꯨꯂꯣꯟ ꯀꯥꯏꯂꯩꯃ	Ngaanulon Kaileima	ꯉꯥꯅꯨꯂꯣꯜ ꯀꯥꯏꯂꯩꯃ	Ngaanulol Kaileima	ꯉꯥꯅꯨꯔꯣꯟ ꯀꯥꯏꯔꯩꯃ	Ngaanuron Kaireima	ꯉꯥꯅꯨꯔꯣꯜ ꯀꯥꯏꯔꯩꯃ	Ngaanurol Kaireima	Queen consort of Khuman King Laiphangpa (Laiphangba)
ꯉꯥꯅꯨꯂꯣꯟ ꯆꯅꯨ ꯈꯝꯄꯤ	Ngaanulon Chanu Khampi	ꯉꯥꯅꯨꯂꯣꯜ ꯆꯅꯨ ꯈꯝꯄꯤ	Ngaanulol Chanu Khampee	ꯉꯥꯅꯨꯔꯣꯟ ꯆꯅꯨ ꯈꯝꯕꯤ	Ngaanuron Chanu Khambi	ꯉꯥꯅꯨꯔꯣꯜ ꯆꯅꯨ ꯈꯝꯕꯤ	Ngaanurol Chanu Khambee	Queen consort of Khuman King Punsi Yumoipa (Punshi Yumoiba)
ꯉꯥꯅꯨꯂꯣꯟ ꯀꯥꯏꯂꯩꯃ	Ngaanulon Kaileima (Note: name is eponymous with previous queens)	ꯉꯥꯅꯨꯂꯣꯜ ꯀꯥꯏꯂꯩꯃ	Ngaanulol Kaileima	ꯉꯥꯅꯨꯔꯣꯟ ꯀꯥꯏꯔꯩꯃ	Ngaanuron Kaireima	ꯉꯥꯅꯨꯔꯣꯜ ꯀꯥꯏꯔꯩꯃ	Ngaanurol Kaireima	Queen consort of Khuman King Yoithong-ngai (Yoithongngai)
ꯉꯥꯅꯨꯂꯣꯟ ꯆꯅꯨ	Ngaanulon Chanu	ꯉꯥꯅꯨꯂꯣꯜ ꯆꯅꯨ	Ngaanulol Chanu	ꯉꯥꯅꯨꯔꯣꯟ ꯆꯅꯨ	Ngaanuron Chanu	ꯉꯥꯅꯨꯔꯣꯜ ꯆꯅꯨ	Ngaanurol Chanu	Queen consort of Khuman King Haolamton (Haoramton)
ꯉꯥꯅꯨꯂꯣꯟ ꯆꯅꯨ	Ngaanulon Chanu	ꯉꯥꯅꯨꯂꯣꯜ ꯆꯅꯨ	Ngaanulol Chanu	ꯉꯥꯅꯨꯔꯣꯟ ꯆꯅꯨ	Ngaanuron Chanu	ꯉꯥꯅꯨꯔꯣꯜ ꯆꯅꯨ	Ngaanurol Chanu	Queen consort of Khuman King Mensompa (Menshomba)
ꯉꯥꯅꯨꯂꯣꯟ ꯈꯥꯏꯊꯤꯄ ꯆꯅꯨ	Ngaanulon Khaithipa Chanu	ꯉꯥꯅꯨꯂꯣꯜ ꯈꯥꯏꯊꯤꯄ ꯆꯅꯨ	Ngaanulol Khaithipa Chanu	ꯉꯥꯅꯨꯔꯣꯟ ꯈꯥꯏꯊꯤꯕ ꯆꯅꯨ	Ngaanuron Khaithiba Chanu	ꯉꯥꯅꯨꯔꯣꯜ ꯈꯥꯏꯊꯤꯕ ꯆꯅꯨ	Ngaanurol Khaithiba Chanu	Queen consort of Khuman King Thongleilom (Thongleirom)
ꯆꯤꯡꯌꯥꯏ ꯉꯥꯅꯨꯂꯣꯟ ꯆꯅꯨ ꯆꯤꯡꯁꯣꯝꯄꯤ	Chingyai Ngaanulon Chanu Chingsompi	ꯆꯤꯡꯌꯥꯏ ꯉꯥꯅꯨꯂꯣꯜ ꯆꯅꯨ ꯆꯤꯡꯁꯣꯝꯄꯤ	Chingyai Ngaanulol Chanu Chingshompi	ꯆꯤꯡꯌꯥꯏ ꯉꯥꯅꯨꯔꯣꯟ ꯆꯅꯨ ꯆꯤꯡꯁꯣꯝꯕꯤ	Chingyai Ngaanuron Chanu Chingsombi	ꯆꯤꯡꯌꯥꯏ ꯉꯥꯅꯨꯔꯣꯜ ꯆꯅꯨ ꯆꯤꯡꯁꯣꯝꯕꯤ	Chingyai Ngaanurol Chanu Chingshombi	Queen consort of Khuman King Thongkalaipa (Thonggraiba)
ꯋꯥꯡꯉꯝꯂꯣꯟ ꯊꯣꯡꯉꯥꯏꯈꯣꯡ	Waang-ngamlon Thong-ngaikhong	ꯋꯥꯡꯉꯝꯂꯣꯜ ꯊꯣꯡꯉꯥꯏꯈꯣꯡ	Waang-ngamlol Thong-ngaikhong					Queen consort of Khuman King Siyalong (Siyarong)
ꯋꯥꯡꯉꯝꯂꯣꯟ ꯄꯤꯌꯥꯏꯊꯣꯡ	Waang-ngamlon Piyaithong	ꯋꯥꯡꯉꯝꯂꯣꯜ ꯄꯤꯌꯥꯏꯊꯣꯡ	Waang-ngamlol Piyaithong					Queen consort of Khuman King Chekyampa (Chekyamba)
ꯌꯣꯏꯂꯨꯝꯂꯦꯟ ꯃꯨꯡꯄꯤ	Yoilumlen Mungpi	ꯌꯣꯏꯂꯨꯝꯂꯦꯜ ꯃꯨꯡꯄꯤ	Yoilumlel Mungpee	ꯌꯣꯏꯔꯨꯝꯂꯦꯟ ꯃꯨꯡꯕꯤ	Yoirumlen Mungbi	ꯌꯣꯏꯔꯨꯝꯂꯦꯜ ꯃꯨꯡꯕꯤ	Yoirumlel Mungbee	Queen consort of Khuman King Thingkon Likmaapa (Thingkon Likmaaba)
ꯃꯣꯏꯂꯥꯡ ꯆꯅꯨ ꯌꯥꯏꯊꯤꯡ ꯀꯣꯟꯅꯨ	Moilang Chanu Yaithing Konnu			ꯃꯣꯏꯔꯥꯡ ꯆꯅꯨ ꯌꯥꯏꯊꯤꯡ ꯀꯣꯅꯨ	Moirang Chanu Yaithing Konu			Queen consort of Khuman King Kaopa (Kaoba)
ꯅꯥꯎꯁꯪ ꯂꯥꯛꯄ ꯆꯅꯨ	Nausang Laakpa Chanu			ꯅꯥꯑꯣꯁꯪ ꯂꯥꯛꯄ ꯆꯅꯨ	Naosang Laakpa Chanu			Queen consort of Khuman King Aton Yaithingpa Nungnang Asonpa
ꯂꯪꯃꯥꯏ ꯆꯅꯨ ꯀꯥꯏꯅꯧꯄꯤ	Langmai Chanu Kainoupi			ꯂꯪꯃꯥꯏ ꯆꯅꯨ ꯀꯥꯏꯅꯧꯕꯤ	Langmai Chanu Kainoubi			Queen consort of Khuman King Samyok Phaapa Yongtaan Thoupa
ꯉꯥꯅꯨꯂꯣꯟ ꯁꯪꯂꯩꯃ	Ngaanulon Sang-Leima	ꯉꯥꯅꯨꯂꯣꯜ ꯁꯪꯂꯩꯃ	Ngaanulol Shang-Leima	ꯉꯥꯅꯨꯔꯣꯟ ꯁꯪꯂꯩꯃ	Ngaanuron Sangleima	ꯉꯥꯅꯨꯔꯣꯜ ꯁꯪꯂꯩꯃ	Ngaanurol Shangleima	Queen consort of Khuman King Thongpu Samuk Konthoupa
ꯉꯥꯅꯨꯂꯣꯟ ꯁꯪꯂꯩꯃ ꯍꯥꯎꯌꯦꯟ ꯈꯣꯡꯇꯧꯄꯤ	Ngaanulon Sang-Leima Hauyen Khongtoupi	ꯉꯥꯅꯨꯂꯣꯜ ꯁꯪꯂꯩꯃ ꯍꯥꯑꯣꯌꯦꯟ ꯈꯣꯡꯇꯧꯄꯤ	Ngaanulol Shang-Leima Haoyen Khongtoupee	ꯉꯥꯅꯨꯔꯣꯟ ꯁꯪꯂꯩꯃ ꯍꯥꯎꯌꯦꯟ ꯈꯣꯡꯇꯧꯕꯤ	Ngaanuron Sang-Leima Hauyen Khongtoubi	ꯉꯥꯅꯨꯔꯣꯜ ꯁꯪꯂꯩꯃ ꯍꯥꯑꯣꯌꯦꯟ ꯈꯣꯡꯇꯧꯕꯤ	Ngaanurol Shang-Leima Haoyen Khongtoubee	Queen consort of Khuman King Thingkol Hanpa (Thingkol Hanba)
ꯌꯣꯏꯂꯨꯝꯂꯦꯟ ꯈꯣꯡꯂꯩꯃ	Yoilumlen Khongleima	ꯌꯣꯏꯔꯨꯝꯂꯦꯜ ꯈꯣꯡꯂꯩꯃꯥ	Yoilumlel Khongleima	ꯌꯣꯏꯔꯨꯝꯂꯦꯟ ꯈꯣꯡꯂꯩꯃ	Yoirumlen Khongleima	ꯌꯣꯏꯔꯨꯝꯂꯦꯜ ꯈꯣꯡꯂꯩꯃꯥ	Yoirumlel Khongleima	Queen consort of Khuman King Kangching Leinaotaapa (Kangching Leinaotaaba)
ꯋꯥꯡꯉꯝꯂꯣꯟ ꯅꯥꯎꯂꯦꯝꯇꯣꯟ	Waang-ngamlon Naulemton	ꯋꯥꯡꯉꯝꯂꯣꯜ ꯅꯥꯎꯂꯦꯝꯇꯣꯜ	Waang-ngamlol Naulemtol	ꯋꯥꯡꯉꯝꯂꯣꯟ ꯅꯥꯎꯔꯦꯝꯇꯣꯟ	Waang-ngamlon Naoremton	ꯋꯥꯡꯉꯝꯂꯣꯜ ꯅꯥꯎꯔꯦꯝꯇꯣꯜ	Waang-ngamlol Naoremtol	Queen consort of Khuman King Ikop Laanthapa (Eekop Laanthaba)
ꯋꯥꯡꯉꯝꯂꯣꯟ ꯑꯄꯥꯟ ꯐꯄꯤ	Waang-ngamlon Apaan Phapi	ꯋꯥꯡꯉꯝꯂꯣꯜ ꯑꯄꯥꯟ ꯐꯄꯤ	Waang-ngamlol Apaan Phapee	ꯋꯥꯡꯉꯝꯂꯣꯟ ꯑꯄꯥꯟ ꯐꯕꯤ	Waang-ngamlon Apaan Phabi	ꯋꯥꯡꯉꯝꯂꯣꯜ ꯑꯄꯥꯟ ꯐꯕꯤ	Waang-ngamlol Apaan Phabee	Queen consort of Khuman King Punsi Pulenhanpa (Punshi Purenhanba)
ꯊꯤꯡꯂꯥꯏ ꯈꯨꯠꯁꯨ ꯆꯅꯨ	Thinglai Khutsu Chanu (Thinglai Khutshu Chanu)							Queen consort of Khuman King Chaalanpa (Chaaranba)
ꯅꯣꯡꯄꯥꯟꯂꯣꯟ ꯇꯥꯂꯝꯁꯨ	Nongpaanlon Talamsu (Talamshu)	ꯅꯣꯡꯄꯥꯟꯂꯣꯜ ꯇꯥꯂꯝꯁꯨ	Nongpaanlol Talamsu	ꯅꯣꯡꯕꯥꯟꯂꯣꯟ ꯇꯥꯔꯝꯁꯨ	Nongbaanlon Taramsu (Taramshu)	ꯅꯣꯡꯕꯥꯟꯂꯣꯜ ꯇꯥꯔꯝꯁꯨ	Nongbaanlol Taramsu	Queen consort of Khuman King Yaosu Ngampa (Yaoshu Ngamba), also known as Yaosulaakpa (Yaoshulaakpa)
ꯋꯥꯡꯉꯝꯂꯣꯟ ꯆꯅꯨ ꯀꯥꯡꯆꯥꯝꯄꯤ	Waang-ngamlon Chanu Kaangchaampi	ꯋꯥꯡꯉꯝꯂꯣꯜ ꯆꯅꯨ ꯀꯥꯡꯆꯥꯝꯄꯤ	Waang-ngamlol Chanu Kaangchaampee	ꯋꯥꯡꯉꯝꯂꯣꯟ ꯆꯅꯨ ꯀꯥꯡꯖꯥꯝꯕꯤ	Waang-ngamlon Chanu Kaangjaambi	ꯋꯥꯡꯉꯝꯂꯣꯜ ꯆꯅꯨ ꯀꯥꯡꯖꯥꯝꯕꯤ	Waang-ngamlol Chanu Kaangjaambee	Queen consort of Khuman King Lamyai Kaikhinpa (Lamyai Kaikhinba)

== See also ==
- Women in Meitei civilization
- List of Meitei princesses
- Meitei queens of Tripura
