= Plants in Meitei culture =

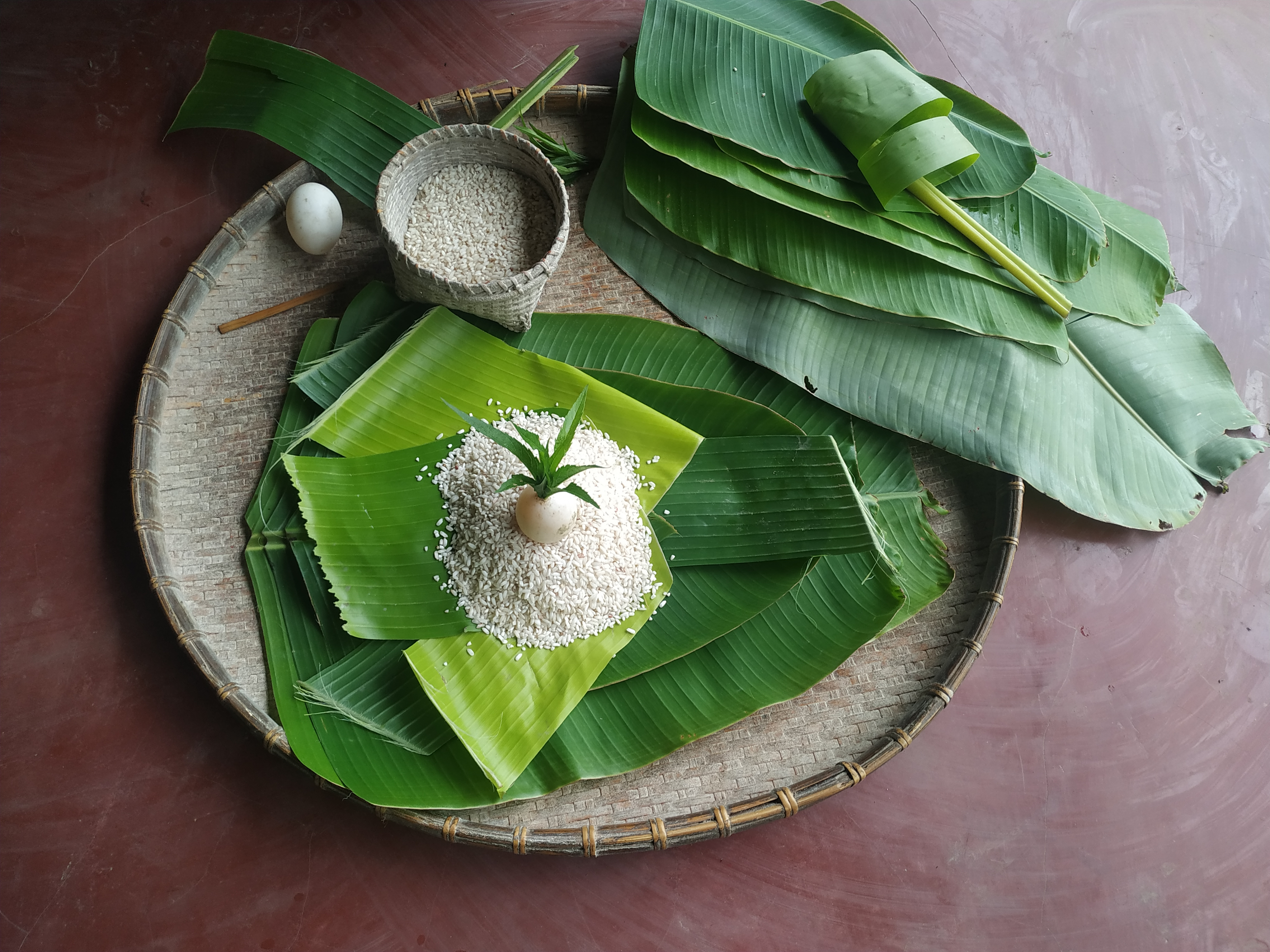
Arrangement of different plant items for a religious ritual.

Many plants (Meitei: pāmbī) play a significant role in Meitei cuisine, festivals, folklore and folktales, literature, mythology and Sanamahism, the indigenous religion of Manipur.

== Sacred botanical totems ==
Botanical totems of the seven Meitei clans
Clan	Sacred plants	Sacred leaves	Sacred fruits	Sacred flowers	Sacred woods/timbers
Ningthouja	Urum	thamlā; thangbilā	lotus seed (thamchet); citron (heijang); Meyna spinosa (heibi)	sacred lotus (thambal)	sayi; jolcham oak (uyung)
Luwang	Albizia chinensis (khok)	lāyāi	pineapple (kihom); Punjab fig (heiba)	pineapple orchid (melei)	Phoebe hainesiana (upal); Indian gooseberry (heikru)
Khuman	Egyptian crowfoot (pungphai)	changbilā; bayur tree (kwāklā); Butea monosperma (khānglā)	false mangosteen (heibung); Indian gooseberry (heikru); cluster fig (heibong)	Magnolia montana (leisang); blue vanda (kwāklei); Goniothalamus sesquipedalis (leikhām)	water pepper (chaokhong); sayi; bamboo (wā)
Angom	Indian cedar (tairel)	dog teak (lārong); Phrynium pubinerve (leihoulā)	cluster fig (heibong); Punjab fig (heiba)	blue lotus (tharo); sacred lotus (thambal)	Phoebe hainesiana (upal); sayi
Moirang	nauhing	Butea monosperma (khānglā)	Roxburgh fig (heiyit)	aloe yucca (yerum lei); hemp-agrimony (lāngthrei)	stone oak (kuhi); Butea monosperma (khānglā); giant cane (tou)
Kha Nganpa	napu nasen	Phrynium pubinerve (leihoulā); lāronglā	Punjab fig (heiba); false mangosteen (heibung)	plumed cockscomb(haorei); aloe yucca (yerum lei); pineapple orchid (melei); Magnolia montana (leisang)	Antidesma acidum (chingyensin)
Chenglei	nāpi singbi	changbilā; thamlā	citron (heijang); false mangosteen (heibung); Microcos paniculata (heitup)	Magnolia montana (leisang); Goniothalamus sesquipedalis (leikhām); Pogostemon parviflorus (sangbrei)	longleaf logwood (nongleisang)

== Plants used in rites and rituals ==
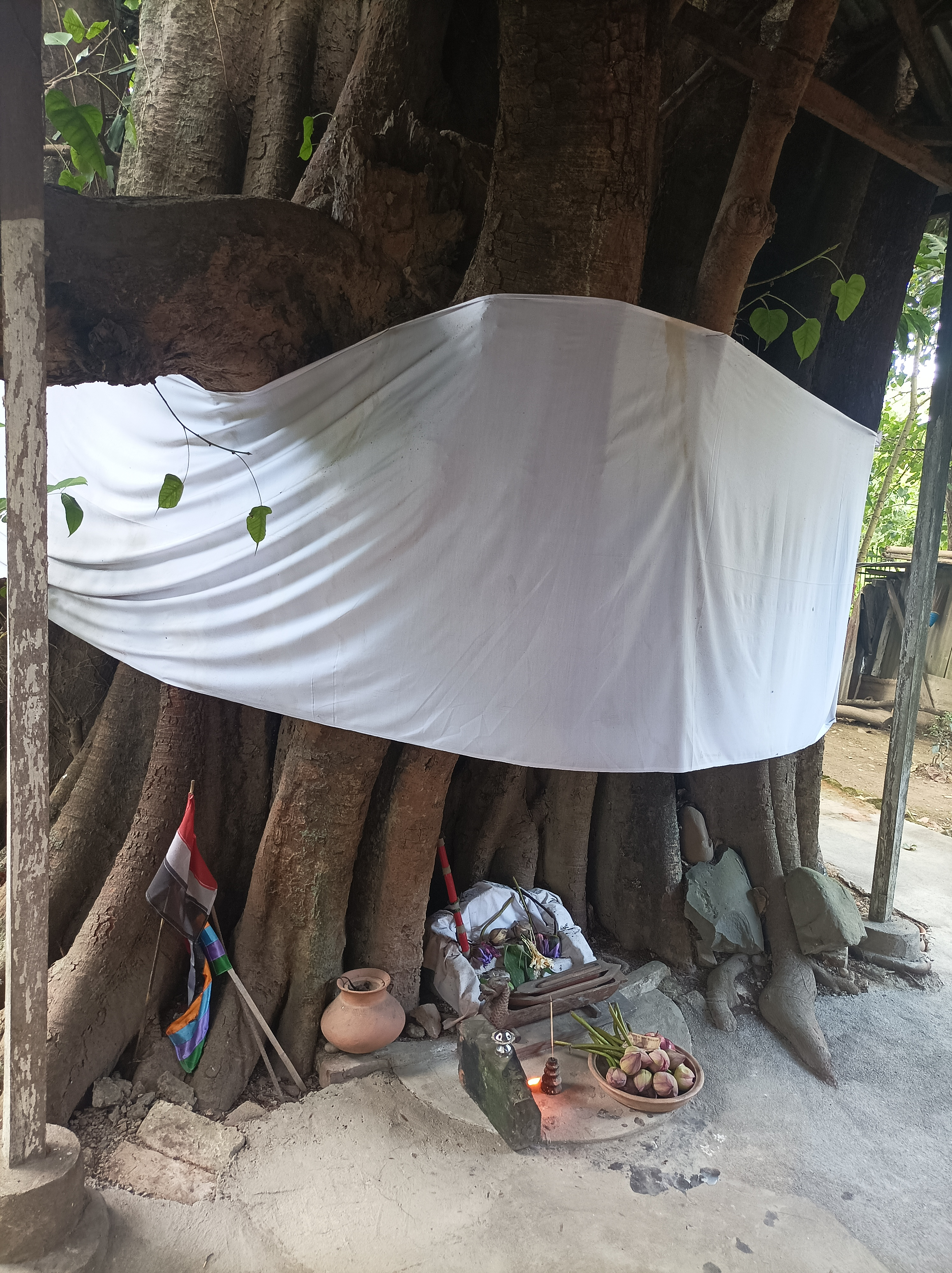
Worship of a banyan tree inside the Kangla

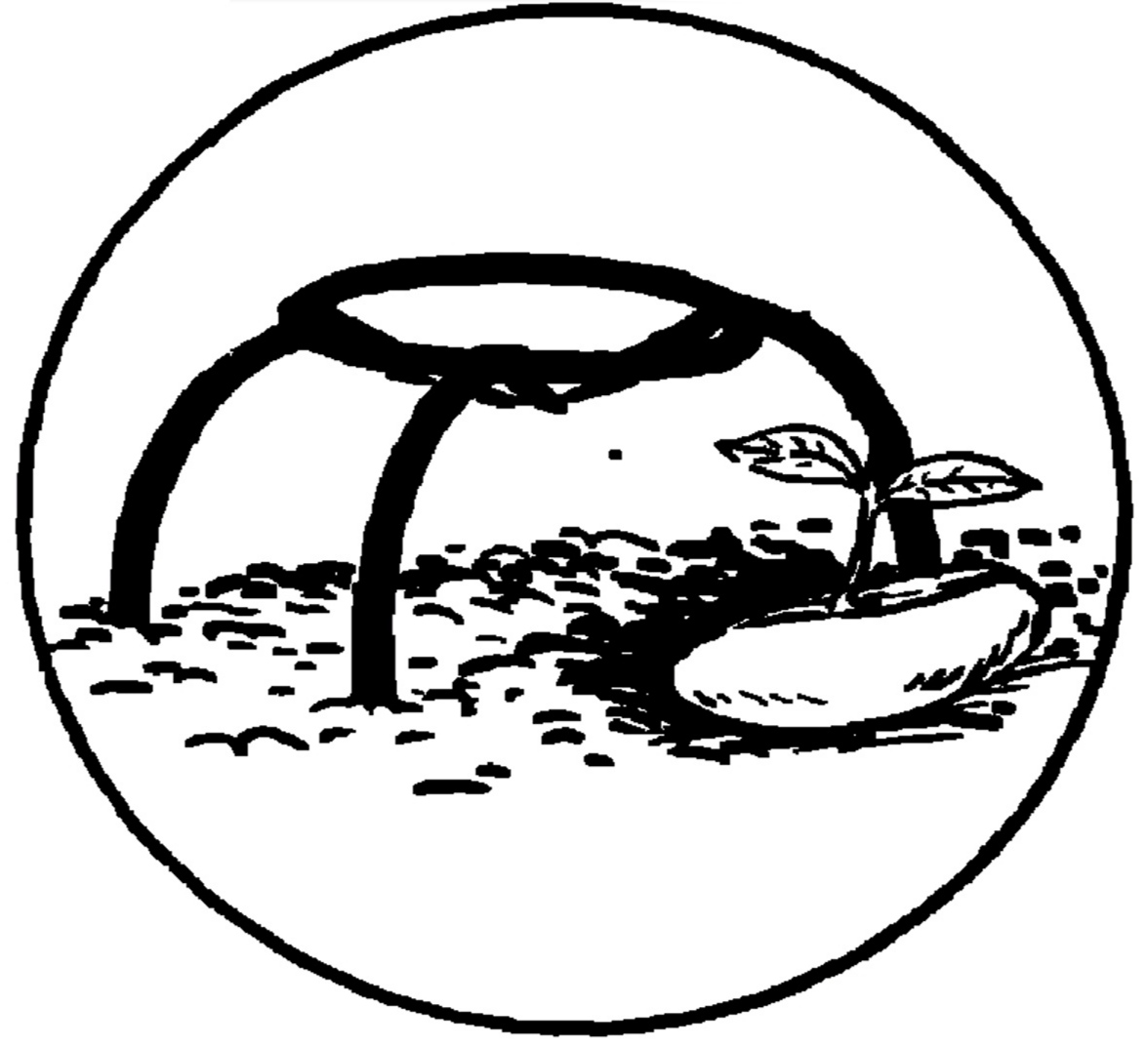
A seedling of the mango tree Heinoukhongnembi is believed to be a divine incarnation of mother goddess Imoinu in Sanamahism.

Safflowers and (Meitei: kushumlei) and irises (kombirei) are used as decorations during the Sajibu Cheiraoba (Lunar Near Year) celebrations. The iris represents love, life and death. It is frequently mentioned in the Meitei folktales and folk songs. In honor of the iris, the Government of Manipur holds an annual Kombirei Festival, with the aim of to preserving the natural habitats of Manupuri flowers like the kombirei.

== Real plants mentioned in old texts ==
=== Cape jasmine ===
Giving reference to Meitei King Khagemba and the Manipur Kingdom, the beauty and grace of Lei Kabok flower, also called Kabok Lei (Gardenia jasminoides, cape jasmine), is described by Meitei King Charairongba, in his book, the "Leiron", as follows:

It is a flower that remains ever fresh as not eaten by worms and is fondly sought after in the four corners of the country, eight directions, nay in all quarters. It is distinct for its beautiful shape, its tender stalk and for its pure white colour. It is a flower once nurtured by King Khagemba who preferred to take it with him even for his long home. It is a flower that comes handy to both boys and girls as a present of love. Such a luscious flower has blossomed forth in an unending array of white and definitely the season is of this flower.

== Real plants mentioned in folklore ==
=== Colocasia/Taro plantation folktale ===
In Meitei mythology and Meitei folklore of Kangleipak (Meitei for 'Manipur'), Pān (Meitei for 'Colocasia' / 'Taro') plants are mentioned. In the Meitei folktale of the Hanuba Hanubi Paan Thaaba (Meitei for 'Old Man and Old Woman planting Colocasia' / 'Taro'), an old aged lonely couple, who have no youths in their family, were deceived by some trickster monkeys, regarding the planting of the Colocasia/Taro plants in a very different unusual style of plantation. The old couple agreed to do the monkeys' advices, peeling off the best tubers of the plants, then boiling them in a pot until softened and after cooling them off, wrapping them in banana leaves and putting them inside the soils of the grounds. In the middle of the night, the monkeys secretly came into the farm and ate all the well cooked plants. After their eating, they (monkeys) planted some inedible giant wild plants in the place where the old couple had placed the cooked plant tubers. In the morning, the old couple were amazed to see the plants getting fully grown up just after one day of planting the tubers. They were unaware of the tricks of the monkeys. So, the old couple cooked and ate the inedible wild Taro plants. As a reaction of eating the wild plants, they suffered from the unbearable tingling sensation in their throats.

== Perspective of Mother nature ==
The narrative poem Hichan Hilao describes how the seventh-century King Luwang Ningthou Punshiba once told his men to cut down a tree in the forest in order to build a beautiful royal boat (Meitei: hiyang hiren). His servants found a suitable tree growing on the slope of a mountain and by the side of a river. They performed traditional customary rites and rituals before chopping down the tree the following day.

During the night, Mother Nature began to weep, fearful of losing her dear child, the tree, and she lamented:

At dead of night
The mother who begot the tree
And the mother of all giant trees,
the queen of the hill-range
And the mistress of the gorges
Took the tall and graceful tree
To her bosom and wailed:
"O my son, tall and big,
While yet an infant, a sapling
Didn't I tell you to be an ordinary tree?

The king's men have found you out
and bought your life with gold and silver.
At daybreak, hacked at the trunk
You will be found lying prostrate.
No longer will you respond
to your mother's call
Nor a likeness of you shall be found,
when I survey The whole hillside.
Who shall now relieve my grief?

— Mother Nature, in Hichen Hilao,

== See also ==
- Kumdamsei
- Hills and mountains in Meitei culture
- Birds in Meitei culture
- Animals in Meitei culture
- Vegetation deity
- Trees in mythology
- Sacred garden
- Sacred tree
- Floral emblem
- Plant epithet
- Nongmaiching Reserved Forest
- Flora (mythology)
- Greek garden
- Roman garden
- Nachom
