= Meitei confederacy =

Alliance of seven Meitei groups

Yek salai flag, representing the seven clans of the Meitei confederacy.

Meitei confederacy, or Meitei confederation, is the union of the seven Meitei clans (Meitei: yek salai).

Prior to unification and formation of the "Meitei confederacy," these groups were independent kingdoms ruled by their own kings. The Mangang, defeated the other clans and the Ningthouja king became the supreme ruler. Initially, the name Meitei referred only to the Ningthouja, but by the 15th century, it had come to refer to all seven clans. Over time, the seven groups united to form one nation but remained separate social entities. Today, clans still play an important role in the social structure of Meitei civilisation, especially in determining marriage patterns, as Meitei people do not marry within the same clan.

== Clans ==
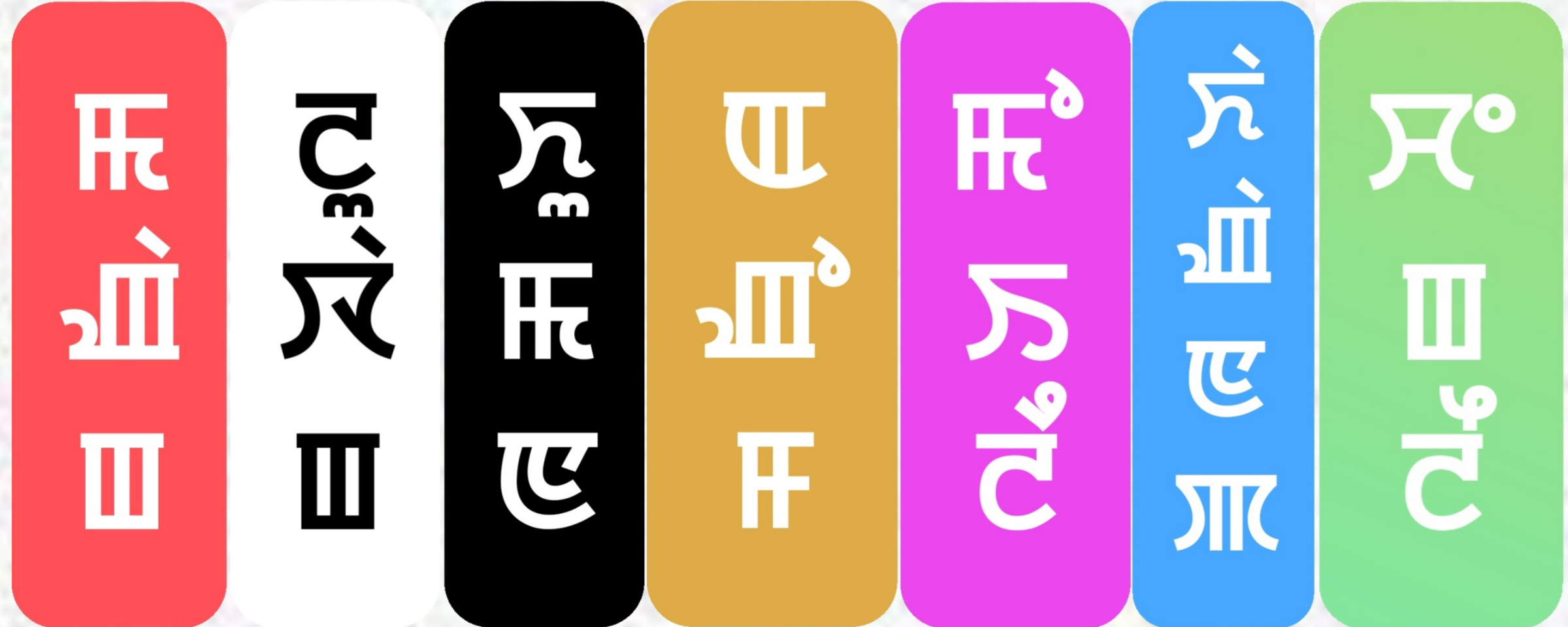
Classical Meitei language names of the 7 groups of Meitei race of Kangleipak in their respective 7 sacred colors

The seven clans of the Meitei confederacy are:

- Mangang (ꯃꯉꯥꯡ) or Ningthouja (ꯅꯤꯡꯊꯧꯖꯥ)
- Luwang (ꯂꯨꯋꯥꯡ)
- Khuman(ꯈꯨꯃꯟ)
- Angom (ꯑꯉꯣꯝ)
- Moilang (ꯃꯣꯏꯂꯥꯡ) or Moirang (ꯃꯣꯏꯔꯥꯡ)
- Kha Nganpa (ꯈꯥ ꯉꯥꯟꯄ)
- Chenglei, Sarang Leishangthem (ꯁꯂꯥꯡ ꯂꯩꯁꯥꯡꯊꯦꯝ), or Salai Leishangthem (ꯁꯂꯥꯏ ꯂꯩꯁꯥꯡꯊꯦꯝ)

Every clan possessed its own lineage and collectively was referred to as a Yek Salai. (Note: "Yek" (ꯌꯦꯛ) means "lineage"; "Salai" (ꯁꯂꯥꯢ) means "clan"; and "Taret" (ꯇꯔꯦꯠ) means "seven") Each Yek Salai can trace its origins back to an ancient semi-mythical or a royal leader. The Yek Salais constitute the socio-political basis of Ancient Kangleipak and still shape Meitei identity and heritage. These Yek Salais form the social and political foundation of Ancient Kangleipak and continue to influence Meitei identity and culture in the present day.

All seven sub-ethnic clans are thought to have descended from the same divine ancestor, the god Pakhangba, according to mythological, religious, and traditional narratives.

These seven Meitei subgroups, nonetheless, were historically distinct ethnic groups with varied origins. Despite this, they shared a common language, although there were dialectal differences, a shared religion with different sects, and a collective homeland known as Kangleipak.

On a brief note, not every people from each clan descends from the clan's common ancestors. An ancestor of a clan means the founder of the main lineage of the clan.

=== Mangang (Ningthouja) ===
The first ever recorded Ningthouja (Mangang) ruler was Nongda Lairen Pakhangba, who was also the first historically attested king of unified Kangleipak. Even though every Mangang today may have not descended from (Nongda Lairen) Pakhangba, he stands as the common ancestor of the clan.

The Mangang as given the name, was previously composed of two groups—Mangang and Ningthouja— These two groups settled in different parts of Manipur:

- Mangang: They settled in the Loiching Phouoiching region of the Koubru-Laimaton range, and also in four other places, Langpachak, Wangon, Oksang, and Thiba.
- Ningthouja: They established their throne at Kangla and lived in the valley regions. Their sphere of influence was also Kanglei Lammahan, which included four villages: Khwai, Yaiskul, Khurai, and Wangkhei.

However, in the 7th century, the Mangang tribes were defeated and merged into the Ningthouja polity during the reign of King Naothingkhong. According to Wahengbam Ibohal, the Ningthoujas eventually came to be known as Mangangs during the reign of Khongtekcha.

=== Luwang-Khuman ===
According to the ancient chronicles of the Khuman clan, the Khuman and Luwang clan share a common ancestor called Poireiton through his two grandsons, Aalong and Pamingnaba. Aalong was elder and founded the Khuman dynasty meanwhile, the younger Pamingnaba founded the Luwang dynasty. The Luwang dynasty maintained political independence until 8th century when they were subdued by the Ningthouja dynasty.

The Khuman dynasty maintained political independence until 14th century when they were subdued by the Meitei king Kongyamba, which resulted in the Khuman kingdom being merged into the Ningthouja dynasty.

However, according to some other historians, the ancestors of Luwang and Khuman are Poireiton and Thongaren respectively.

=== Angom ===
The Angom clan traces its ancestry to Pureiromba, the founder and the first king of the Angom dynasty. They firstly lived at Kongba Maru and later lived with the Ningthoujas. They later fled to Kontha and a section of the clan moved to Nongmaiching Ching. The capital of the Angom clan was at Kongba.

Pureiromba was a senior contemporary of the Meitei king Nongda Lairen Pakhangba.

=== Moirang ===
The Moirang clan traces its ancestry to Ngangningsing Atengba, and Nganghunthok. They were the sons of the same mother but different fathers. As per the Moirang Ningthourol, Ngangningsing is listed as the first king of Moirang, while his elder brother, Nganghunthok ruled at Koubru.

Ngangningsing and Nganghunthok were the sons of Leinung Ngangsabi, the daughter of Nganba Khamchingkon Haiheiba (Urenhanba). According to Indramani, Ngangningsing was the progenitor of Moirang Ariba (old), while Nganghunthok was the progenitor of Moirang Anouba (new).

However, according to some other historians, the ancestor of Moirang is Ngangningsing only.

=== Khaba-Nganba ===
The Khaba-Nganba clan was originally two separate clans, Khaba, and Nganba. The Khabas were once powerful group, having ruled Kangla before the ascension of Meitei king Nongda Lairen Pakhangba although they had already declined. According to Hareshwar Goshwami, as well as the ancient Meitei text Chengleiron, Nongda Lairen Pakhangba subjugated the powers of Sorarel Ariba Ahum, who were the chiefs of three clans, viz. Chengleis, Luwangs and Nganbas. After Nongda Lairen Pakhangba became king, the Khaba and Nganba clan lost its independence.

According to Irom Amubi Singh, King Naokhamba, having learnt that Khabas were the enemies of his forefather, Nongda Lairen Pakhangba, decided to kill all the Khabas. The Khabas then scattered in different places and merged into other tribes. So, the ancestor of Khaba-Nganba clan is taken as Nganba Khamchingkon. It seems that during the time of Khaba Tulumba and Nganba Khamchingkon, the merger of the two groups took place.

=== Sarang-Leishangthem (Chenglei) ===
The founder and first king of the Chenglei clan was Nungou Yumthangba. His elder brother, Lamlekshang became went up to the hills and became Kabui. Nungou Yumthangba's younger brother, Lokpa (Thengkoipa) founded the Haorok-Konthou lineage.

== Territories, and totems ==
Yek Salai	Traditional Ancestors	Territory	Sacred Water	Sacred Fire	Totem	Colour	
Yek Salai	Mangang	Pakhangba	Imphal Kangla	Nungseng	Meiyei Meithang		red
Luwang	Poireiton	Luwangsangbam Kangla	Lamphel	Khoiju		white	
Khuman	Poireiton, Thongalen	Mayang Imphal	Pumlen	Meithang		black	
Angom	Pureiromba	Kongba	Kongba Meironbi	Meiba Chingba Mei		yellow	
Moilang	Nganghunthok, Ngangningsing	Moirang Kangla	Loktak	Meithang		deep pink	
Kha Nganpa	Khamdingou	Wangching Sanggai Kangla	Leitang	Leikham Waimei		blue	
Chenglei	Nungngou Yumthangba	Wangoi Kangla	Takna	Leikham Waimeithang		green	

== Botanical Totems ==
Botanical totems of the seven Meitei clans
Clan	Sacred plants	Sacred leaves	Sacred fruits	Sacred flowers	Sacred woods/timbers
Ningthouja	Urum	thamlā; thangbilā	lotus seed (thamchet); citron (heijang); Meyna spinosa (heibi)	sacred lotus (thambal)	sayi; jolcham oak (uyung)
Luwang	Albizia chinensis (khok)	lāyāi	pineapple (kihom); Punjab fig (heiba)	pineapple orchid (melei)	Phoebe hainesiana (upal); Indian gooseberry (heikru)
Khuman	Egyptian crowfoot (pungphai)	changbilā; bayur tree (kwāklā); Butea monosperma (khānglā)	false mangosteen (heibung); Indian gooseberry (heikru); cluster fig (heibong)	Magnolia montana (leisang); blue vanda (kwāklei); Goniothalamus sesquipedalis (leikhām)	water pepper (chaokhong); sayi; bamboo (wā)
Angom	Indian cedar (tairel)	dog teak (lārong); Phrynium pubinerve (leihoulā)	cluster fig (heibong); Punjab fig (heiba)	blue lotus (tharo); sacred lotus (thambal)	Phoebe hainesiana (upal); sayi
Moirang	nauhing	Butea monosperma (khānglā)	Roxburgh fig (heiyit)	aloe yucca (yerum lei); hemp-agrimony (lāngthrei)	stone oak (kuhi); Butea monosperma (khānglā); giant cane (tou)
Kha Nganpa	napu nasen	Phrynium pubinerve (leihoulā); lāronglā	Punjab fig (heiba); false mangosteen (heibung)	plumed cockscomb(haorei); aloe yucca (yerum lei); pineapple orchid (melei); Magnolia montana (leisang)	Antidesma acidum (chingyensin)
Chenglei	nāpi singbi	changbilā; thamlā	citron (heijang); false mangosteen (heibung); Microcos paniculata (heitup)	Magnolia montana (leisang); Goniothalamus sesquipedalis (leikhām); Pogostemon parviflorus (sangbrei)	longleaf logwood (nongleisang)

== Related pages ==
- Apokpa
- Apokpa Marup
- Sanamahism

== Bibliography ==
- Goshwami, Hareshwar (2019). History of the People of Manipur (2nd ed.). London: Yaol Publishing Limited. ISBN 978-1-9993057-0-3 – via Archive.org.
