= Tengleimaka Amba =

Tengleimaka Amba (ꯇꯦꯡꯂꯩꯃꯀꯥ ꯑꯥꯝꯕ) was a Meitei warrior from the Mangang clan in ancient Kangleipak (early Manipur). He is known for his duel with the Khuman warrior Haokhong Sinaikhu. He is notably mentioned in the classical Meitei literary text Chainarol (An Account of Combats). His character is known for themes of honour, oath-breaking, and divine retribution. His story is served as a cautionary tale about dishonour and divine punishment. His deception is viewed as contrasting to the bravery and moral integrity of Haokhong Sinaikhu. Despite his skill as a warrior, Tengleimaka's legacy is shadowed by his failure to uphold the martial code of honour.

== Background ==
Tengleimaka Amba lived during a time in early Meitei civilisation when single combat between warriors from different clans was a respected tradition. These duels followed a strict code of conduct and were usually fought to settle disputes, assert clan prestige, or prove one's personal bravery.

He represented the Mangang clan, one of the dominant groups of the region, and participated in a formal duel with a rival from the Khuman clan.

== Duel with Haokhong Sinaikhu ==
In the duel between Tengleimaka Amba and Haokhong Sinaikhu, Sinaikhu's spear struck first, causing blood to be drawn, a clear mark of victory according to the rules of such fights. Realizing his life was in Sinaikhu's hands, Tengleimaka humbly requested to be spared, swearing by the sacred spear that he would go home and tell his people he had been defeated.

Moved by this plea and the sanctity of the oath, Sinaikhu spared his life and returned home, claiming victory.

== Breaking of the Oath ==
The following year, a Khuman minstrel on a visit to the Mangang kingdom saw Tengleimaka Amba alive, dressed in regal attire and walking proudly toward the royal court. When asked about his earlier defeat, Tengleimaka mocked the claim, denied the defeat, and accused the Khuman bard of spreading lies.

The news reached Haokhong Sinaikhu, who was deeply ashamed and angry. Remembering that Tengleimaka had sworn by the sacred spear, Sinaikhu cast the weapon into fire, invoking divine justice. Shortly afterward, Tengleimaka Amba died suddenly, believed to be a result of breaking a sacred oath.

== See also ==
- Meitei confederacy
- Meitei warrior traditions
- Khuman warrior traditions
- Meitei martial arts
- Meitei traditional weapons
- Khuman kingdom
- Moirang kingdom
- Khuman Kangleirol
- Moirang Kangleirol
