= Khoiri Tonjaosu =

Khoiri Tonjaosu (Note: written in traditional Meitei Mayek script as ꯈꯣꯏꯔꯤ ꯇꯣꯟꯖꯥꯎꯁꯨ.) was a warrior from the Moirang clan mentioned in the classical Meitei literary text Chainarol (An Account of Combats). He was known for his controversial victory over the Khuman warrior Thongbu Wainucha. While he was a capable warrior, his method of achieving victory has made him a symbol of deceitful conduct within a warrior tradition that preferred nobility and fairness in ancient Kangleipak.

== Background ==
Khoiri Tonjaosu lived during a time when ancient Meitei civilization had ritual combating, focusing on personal honour, and clan pride. He was born in ancient Moirang, one of the principalities in ancient Kangleipak. He was remembered in the literary record as traveling with his companion Khoiri Lamsingba, with whom he shared close companionship and military goals.

== Duel at Waya Khong ==
In one of the notable episodes in the Chainarol text, Khoiri Tonjaosu and Khoiri Lamsingba went to a place named Waya Khong. It was a tract of land, which many people had claims over it. There, they encountered Thongbu Wainucha and Makpiting Haomiyacha, two Khuman warriors with the same claim. A formal duel fighting was proposed. The first fighting was proposed to be with spears, and then wrestling. During the fighting, neither side was able to win.

== Controversial victory ==
Khoiri Tonjaosu, as suggested by his companion, decided to do a dishonourable tactic during the wrestling match. He bit his opponent Thongbu Wainucha’s private parts. It was a violation of the traditional warrior code of conduct. Thongbu, getting painful, collapsed on the ground. This opportunity allowed Tonjaosu to decapitate his Khuman opponent and return to Moirang in triumph. Thus, he won the fight by treachery, contrasting with the opposing honourable tone of many traditional Chainarol combats.

== See also ==
- Meitei confederacy
- Meitei warrior traditions
- Khuman warrior traditions
- Meitei martial arts
- Meitei traditional weapons
- Khuman kingdom
- Moirang kingdom
- Khuman Kangleirol
- Moirang Kangleirol
