= Ningthoujam =

Ningthoujam is a Meitei family name in Manipur and other north eastern parts of India. It is part of the Mangang clan or yek salai. "Ningthou" means king and "jam" means progeny and is a popular suffix added to Meitei surnames.

Ningthoujam is one of the 827 surnames or yumnaks under the seven clans of Meiteis.

Notable people with this surname are:

- Ningthoujam Pritam Singh, Indian professional footballer
- Bidyananda Singh Ningthoujam, Indian professional footballer

== See also ==
- Ningthouja dynasty
