= Kongba Maru =

Meitei sacred place in Imphal East, Manipur, India

Kongba Maru ꯀꯣꯡꯕ ꯃꯔꯨ
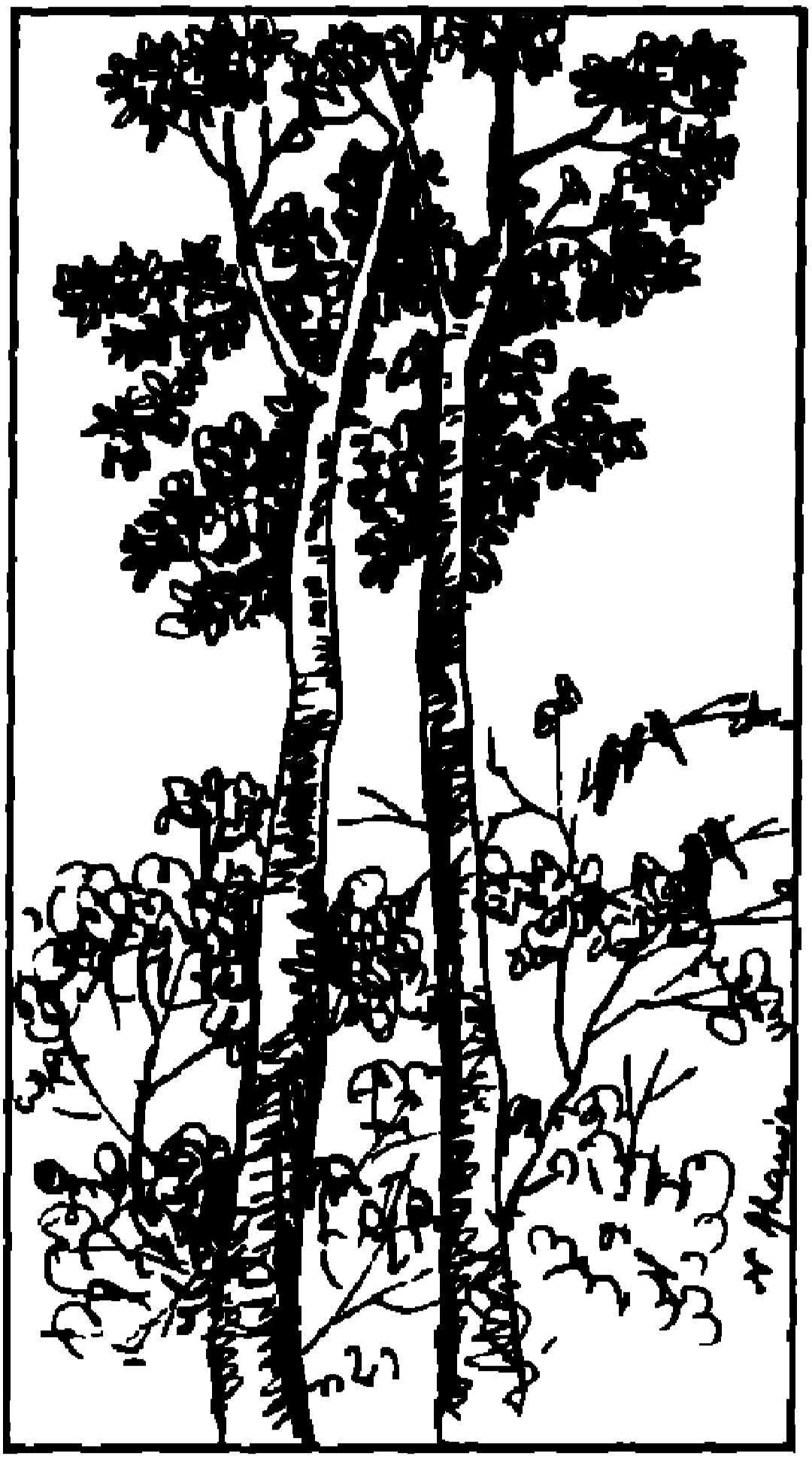
- The twin sacred trees (U Machin-Manao) growing in the Kongba Maru religious site, being a notable example of the holy plants in Meitei culture
- Etymology: origin of the Kongba river
- Country: India
- State: Manipur
- District: Imphal East district
- Police station jurisdiction: Sagolmang Police Station jurisdiction
- Founder: Angoms

Government
  - Type: religious
  - Body: Umanglai Kanba Apunba Lup (UKAL)

Kongba Maru (Meitei: ꯀꯣꯡꯕ ꯃꯔꯨ), also known as Kongba Maru Laipham (Meitei: ꯀꯣꯡꯕ ꯃꯔꯨ ꯂꯥꯏꯐꯝ) or Kongba Maru Laiphamlen (Meitei: ꯀꯣꯡꯕ ꯃꯔꯨ ꯂꯥꯏꯐꯝꯂꯦꯟ), is a holy and sacred place of the Meitei people. It is located in Imphal East district of Manipur state. It has numerous religious sites of traditional Meitei religion (Sanamahism), including but not limited to Hinaotabi Hiden, U Machin-Manao shrine and Hijaotabi Hiden.

== History ==
Kongba Maru is the place where Meitei people of the Angom group started to settle for the first time, before coming to the Kangla, to cohabit with the Ningthoujas.

== Geography ==
Kongba Maru Laipham is the origin of the Kongba River, which is joined by other tributaries as it flows. It is located about 22 kilometers from Imphal. It is under the jurisdiction of the Sagolmang Police Station.

== Pilgrimage ==
Starting from the first Sunday after Sajibu Nongma Panba, in the Meitei calendar, many people visit to pray at this sacred place every Sunday throughout the Sajibu month.

The administration of the annual pilgrimage is mainly done by the Umanglai Kanba Apunba Lup (UKAL).

== Destruction ==
On July 6, 2023, the sacred sites in the Kongba Maru Laiphamlen were burned down by the Kuki militants in Imphal East and fired several rounds of gunshots at the Meitei settlements.

== See also ==
- Heingang Ching
- Mount Koubru
- Nongmaiching hill
- Thangjing hill
