= Yek Salai =

Tradition of the indigenous communities of Kangleipak

Yek Salai 7 Flag, representing the 7 groups

A Yek Salai or a Yek or a Salai refers to one member group within a union of seven groups, predominantly in the traditions of the indigenous communities with origins in Kangleipak (present day Manipur state of India). The most notable example of such a union of 7 yek salai groups is that of the Meitei confederacy (Meitei: Meitei Yek Salai Taret). Each yek salai group contains numerous families (Meitei: yumnak). Initially, "yek" means "lineage", and "salai" means "clan".

It was also created by the king in other ethnicities, including but not limited to Aimol people, Anal people, Chiru people, Chothe people, Inpui people, Kabui people, Kharam people, Koireng people, Kom people, Lamkang people, Liangmei people, Mao people, Maram people, Maring people, Moyon people, Monshang people, Paomai people, Purum people, Rongmei people, Tarao people, Thangal people, Tangkhul people and Zemei people.

== In the Meitei Confederacy ==
The Yek Salai of the Meitei confederacy are

- Mangang (ꯃꯉꯥꯡ) or Ningthouja (ꯅꯤꯡꯊꯧꯖꯥ)
- Luwang (ꯂꯨꯋꯥꯡ)
- Khuman(ꯈꯨꯃꯟ)
- Angom (ꯑꯉꯣꯝ)
- Moilang (ꯃꯣꯏꯂꯥꯡ) or Moirang (ꯃꯣꯏꯔꯥꯡ)
- Kha Nganpa (ꯈꯥ ꯉꯥꯟꯄ)
- Chenglei, Sarang Leishangthem (ꯁꯂꯥꯡ ꯂꯩꯁꯥꯡꯊꯦꯝ), or Salai Leishangthem (ꯁꯂꯥꯏ ꯂꯩꯁꯥꯡꯊꯦꯝ)

== In other ethnic groups ==
Sub-groups in the Yek Salai system
Ethnicities	Groups						
Anal (Anan)	Murchal	Masum	Pasen	Chantung	Runlal	Yasha	Hrangpung
Chiru	Samia	Ashou	Achi	Sonam	Anam Bahai	Hua	Achon
Chothe, Kom	Yurung	Thao	Marim	Parpa	Rrangsai	Makal	Rakhung
Inpui	Riamroi	Bariam	Khumba	Inka	Bariamtak	Bariampaan	Balang
Kabui	Kammei	Gangmei	Golmei	Lomgmei	Maringmei	Palmei	Paomei
Koireng	Yaite	Sonthu	Leison	Tumtin	Tente	Walbe	Mikle
Kharam	Sheiphu	Sheichel	Rangla	Rakhou	Seilou	Mareeyam	Kailam
Lamkang	Suwngnem/Sankhil	Khular	Dilbung	Shilshi	Tholung/Jangvei	Kangten	Leivon, Surte
Mao	Ahui	Amei	Sinmarei	Akonglei	Asus Anem	Khote Lamei	Anui
Maram	Akhanosum	Soute	Ahongnu	Asom	Luklei	Lusae	Hakup
Maring	Dalla	Raj	Dingthoi	Chongdur	Sampur	Thoitak	Thangnga
Moyon and Monsang	Ruin Wangran	Chinir Numgohin	Sason Hungam	Songahir Khartur	Nguru Langrom	Sirbum Turip	Bungehir Charu
Poumai	Alui	Akhet	Ahim	Atao	Amei Hutae	Amei Hutei	Aman
Purum	Haonam	Puinae	Seo	Louten	Hounae	Haotuk	Henttaogh
Tangkhul	Duidang	Sadang	Khodang	Khapudang	Choudang	Sithudand	Kingdang
Tarao	Akheng Lentae	Atoilu	Puinae	Lourrei	Lanchi Siru	Alikleiill na	Alek

== Related pages ==
- Mangang Luwang Khuman
- Apokpa
- Apokpa Marup
- Sanamahism

== Bibliography ==
- Laishram Basanti, Department of History (23 July 2019). A study of political history of Manipur from Pakhangba to Khagemba (Thesis). Attribution-NonCommercial-ShareAlike 4.0 International(CC BY-NC-SA 4.0). "Heirem Khunjan, Hao-rok Konthou and some other ancient Manipuri text and archaeological findings. N. Birachandra, Meitei Leipakta Yek Salai Hourakpa. Amasy Chaokhalakpa"
