= Yumnak =

Family name in the Metei community

Yumnak is a family name (Sagei) In the Meetei society, and they speak Meetei Language. The name Yamunak as Pronounced "yoom-naak". Ethnic yumnaks are used in the Meetei /Meitei community including the Meitei Pangal and Meitei Bamon (Manipuri Brahmin).

The Meitei community lie largely in the Northeast India, mainly in Manipur, Next in Assam, Tripura and a few in Mizoram, Nagaland, Meghalaya. Some live in Bangladesh and Myanmar.

== Historical background ==
In Meetei society, all the yumnak belong to only one of the Salai Taret except the Yumnak of the Meitei Bamon (Manipuri Brahmin) including Kshetrimayum. There are seven major Salais or Yek Salais or Salai Taret, namely :

1. Mangang
2. Luwang
3. Khuman
4. Angom
5. Moirang
6. Kha Nganba
7. Sarang Leishangthem (Chenglei).

Yumnaks are the sub-clans of these seven major Salai, formed by the collection of different Yumnaks. Yumnaks inhabited specific areas and formed collectives. Later, these family members migrated to different areas, dispersing their Yumnaks.

== The Yumnaks which do not have Yek Salai ==
Yumnaks without Yek Salai are Meitei Brahmin surnames that do not follow the Yek Salai tradition, unlike other Yumnaks as they are not of Meitei origin. Notable clans such as Aribam, Kshetrimayum, Gurumayum, and Lairikyengpham do not have any Yek Salais.

== Unique Naming System ==
From ancient immemorial time, based on Meitei custom, naming system differs between males and females.

Commonly, in both the genders the person's Yumnak is used as a prefix to their name. Keeping their respective names in the middle. The suffix name part is the one differing from males to females.

In females, the suffix name part is made either by the gender identification or marital status identification like "Chanu". After getting married, the females changed their suffix part to "Leima", adding the term "Ningol" just after her paternal surname and by adding "Ongbi" after her husband's surname completes her full name.

Examples :

A female Meitei having the name Leishna with Khaidem as her paternal Yumnak will have her full name, before getting married, as per the Meitei custom as,

- Khaidem Leishna Chanu

After getting married, assuming, she married Narumbam Sanathoi Angomcha, noting that Narumbam is her husband's surname, Sanathoi is her husband's name and Angom is her husband's Salai/Clan name. Then, her full name as per the Meitei custom will be changed as,

- Khaidem Ningol Narumbam Ongbi Leishna Leima

NOTE : The females don't carry their Salai/Clan name because the Salai/Clan system is a patrilineality one.

In males, the suffix is made either by the name of their respective Salai or gender identification like "Meitei/Meetei" for males. And sometimes by adding "cha" to their respective Salai or Clan name. "Cha" meaning "child".

Examples: A male Meitei having the name Ahenba with 'sougrakpam as Yumnak, and noting that 'sougrakpam surname belongs to Mangang clan, will have his full name as per the Meitei custom as,

- Sougrakpam Ahenba Mangang or
- Sougrankpam Ahenba Meitei or
- Sougrakpam Ahenba Meetei or
- Sougrakpam Ahenba Mangangcha

Through these Yumnaks, the genealogy of Meitei can be traced.

== See also ==
- History of Manipur
- Kakching Khunou
- Meitei people
- Indian name
