= Ningthouja =

Ningthouja (or Ningthoucha) refers to:

- Ningthouja dynasty, the ruling family of the historic Manipur Kingdom (erstwhile Kangleipak)
- Another name for the Mangang clan of the Meitei ethnicity
- A synonym for Ningthoujam family, one of the main branches of the Ningthouja alias Mangang clan

== See also ==
- Ningthou
- Ningthoukhong
