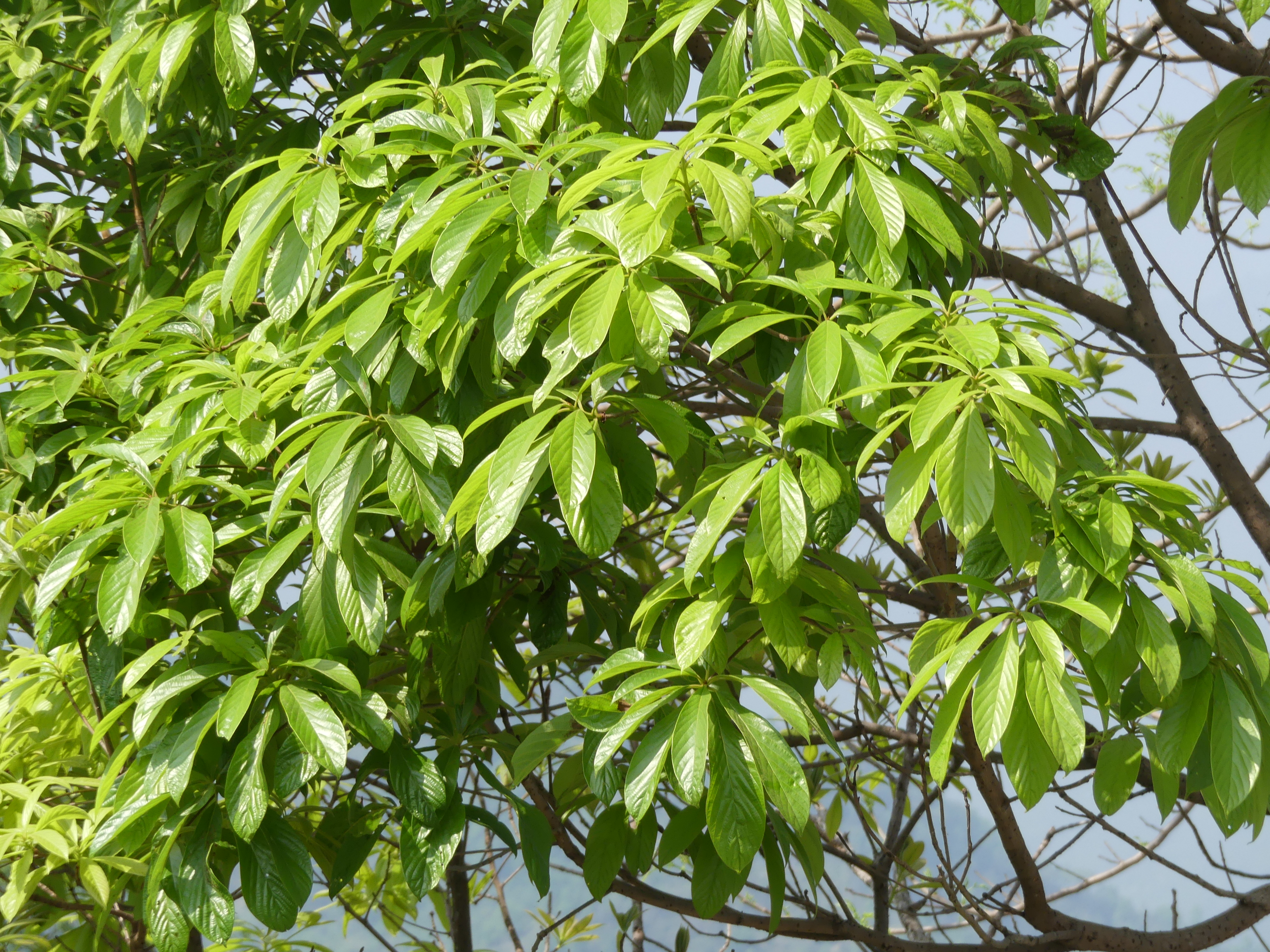

Conservation status
- Endangered (IUCN 3.1)

Scientific classification
- Kingdom: Plantae
- Clade: Tracheophytes
- Clade: Angiosperms
- Clade: Magnoliids
- Order: Laurales
- Family: Lauraceae
- Genus: Phoebe
- Species: P. bootanica

Binomial name
- Phoebe bootanica (Meisn.) M.Gangop.

Synonyms
- Machilus bootanicus Meisn.; Persea bootanica (Meisn.) Kosterm.; Phoebe assamica Kalyankumar; Phoebe cooperiana P.C.Kanjilal & Das; Phoebe goalparensis Hutch.; Phoebe hainesiana Brandis

= Phoebe bootanica =

Species of tree

Phoebe bootanica (Meitei: Uningthou; literally, "tree king" or "wood king") is a species of tree in the family Lauraceae It is native to the central and eastern Himalayas, including Nepal and Bhutan, and northeastern India. It is the state tree of Manipur. It can grow up to 30 metres tall. Its natural habitat is moist subtropical to temperate montane forests from 1,300 to 1,600 metres elevation. The species is threatened with habitat loss from deforestation for agriculture, plantations, and timber extraction. The IUCN Red List assesses the species as Endangered.

The species was first described as Machilus bootanicus by Carl Meissner in 1864. In 2011 Mohan Gangopadhyay placed the species in genus Phoebe as P. bootanica.
