= Phrynium pubinerve =

Scientific classification
- Kingdom: Plantae
- Clade: Embryophytes
- Clade: Tracheophytes
- Clade: Angiosperms
- Clade: Monocots
- Clade: Commelinids
- Order: Zingiberales
- Family: Marantaceae
- Genus: Phrynium
- Species: P. pubinerve

Binomial name
- Phrynium pubinerve Blume, 1827

Synonyms
- Pontederia ovata Linné; Phyllodes pubinervis (Blume) Kuntze; Phyllodes pubigera (Blume) Kuntze; Phyllodes capitata Kuntze; Phrynium thorelii Gagnep. Phrynium rheedei Suresh & Nicolson; Phrynium pubigerum Blume; Phrynium philippinense Ridl. Phrynium ovatum (Linné) Druce; Phrynium malaccense Ridl. Phrynium laoticum Gagnep. Phrynium densiflorum Moritzi ex Körn. Phrynium capitatum Willd. Narukila ovata (Linné) Farw.

Species of flowering plant

Phrynium pubinerve is the type species of the plant genus Phrynium, in the family Marantaceae. It is widespread throughout Asia, with records from India, China, and Indo-China through to New Guinea; no subspecies are listed in the Catalogue of Life.

== Gallery ==
As with Stachyphrynium placentarium leaves of this species may be used as a wrapping for food and other items (illustrations here are from Laos).

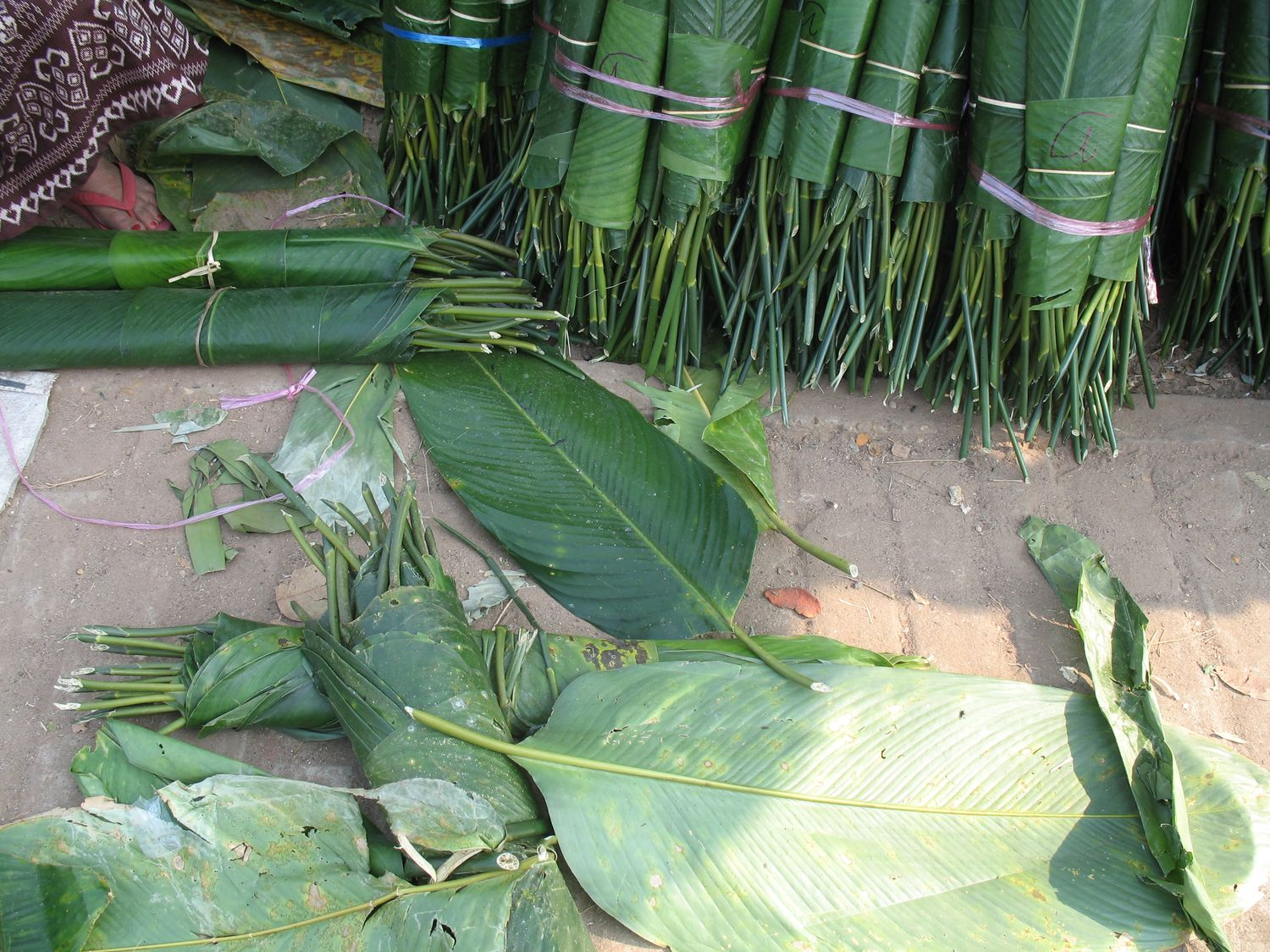

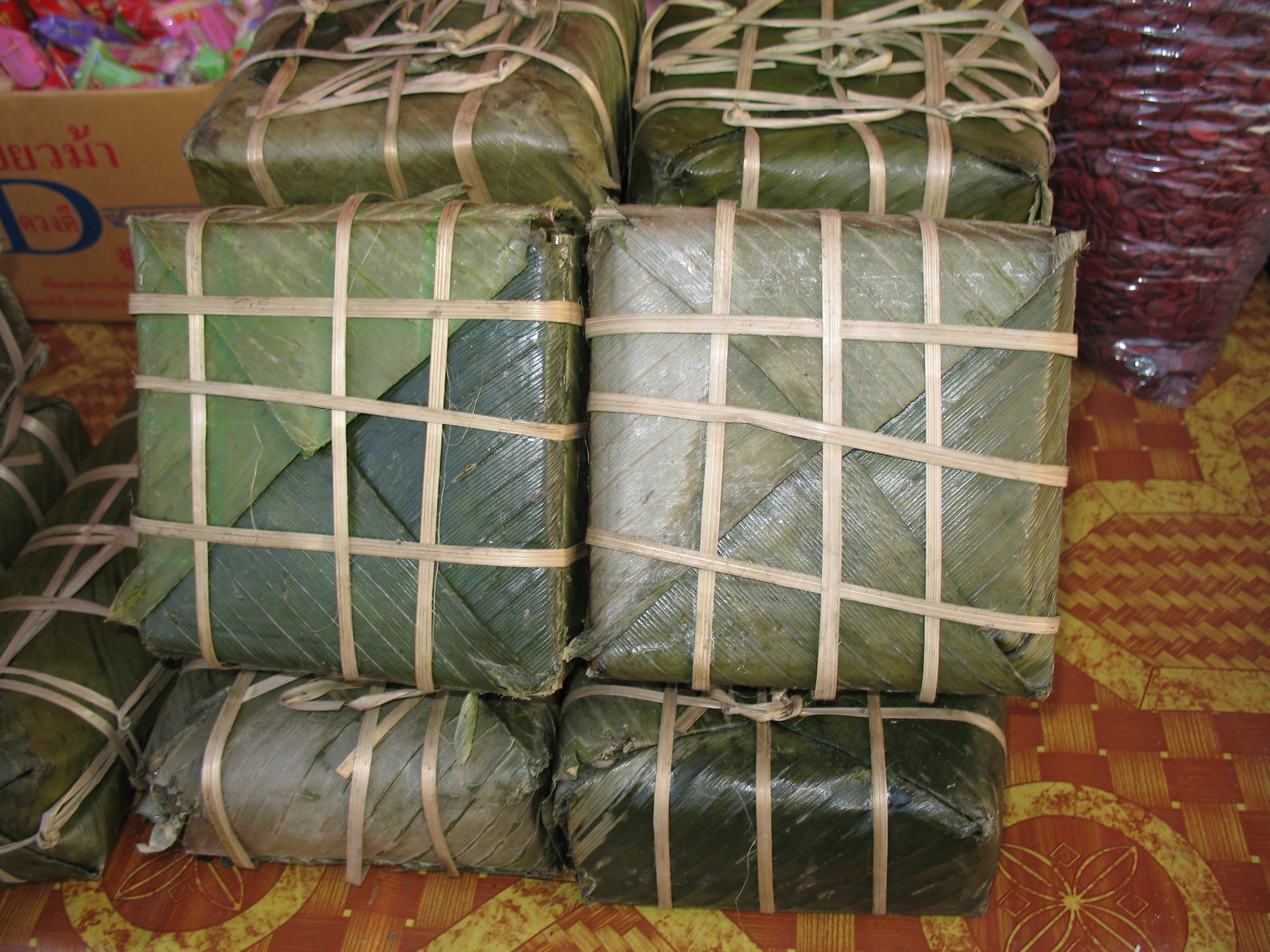

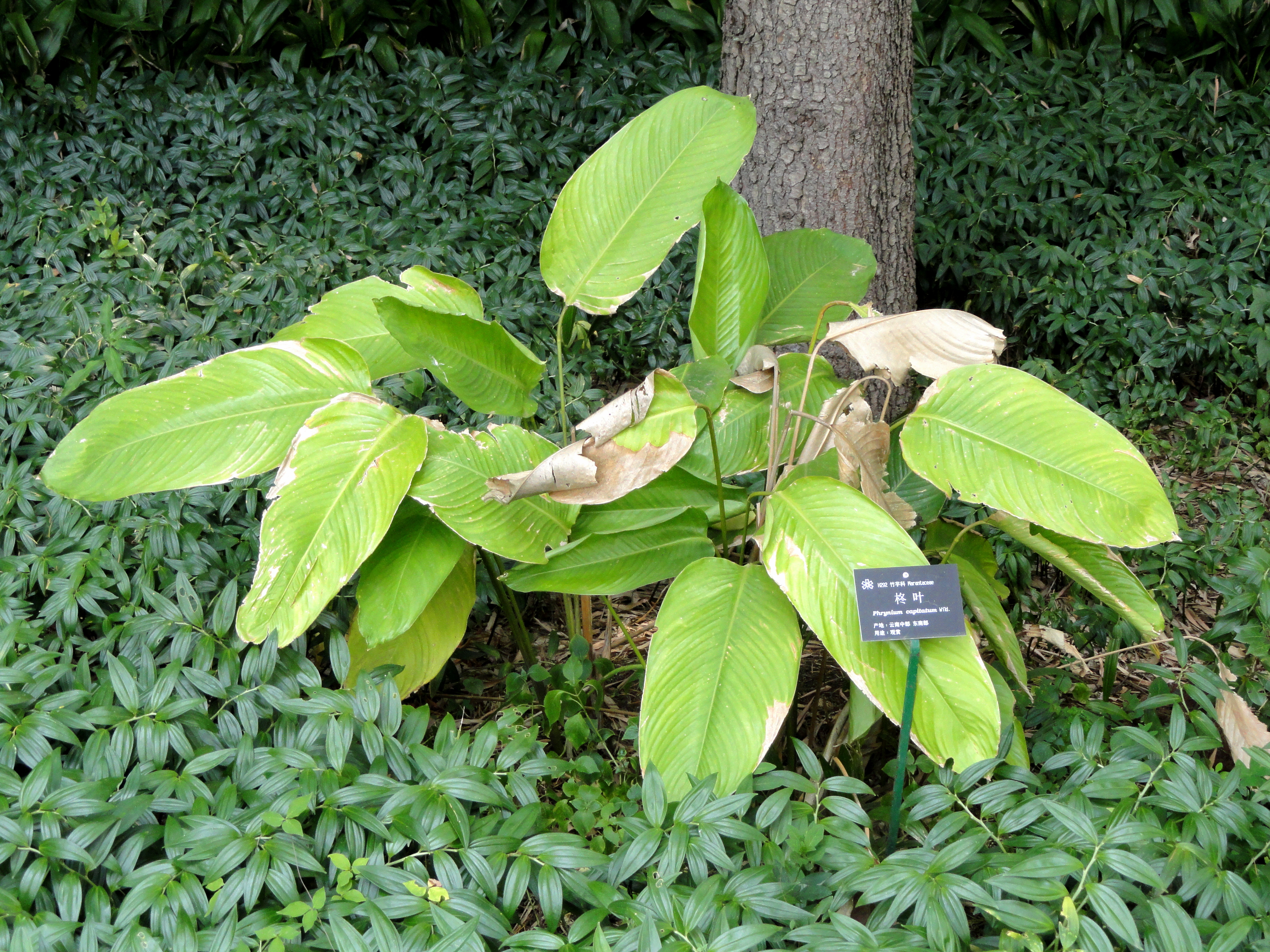
