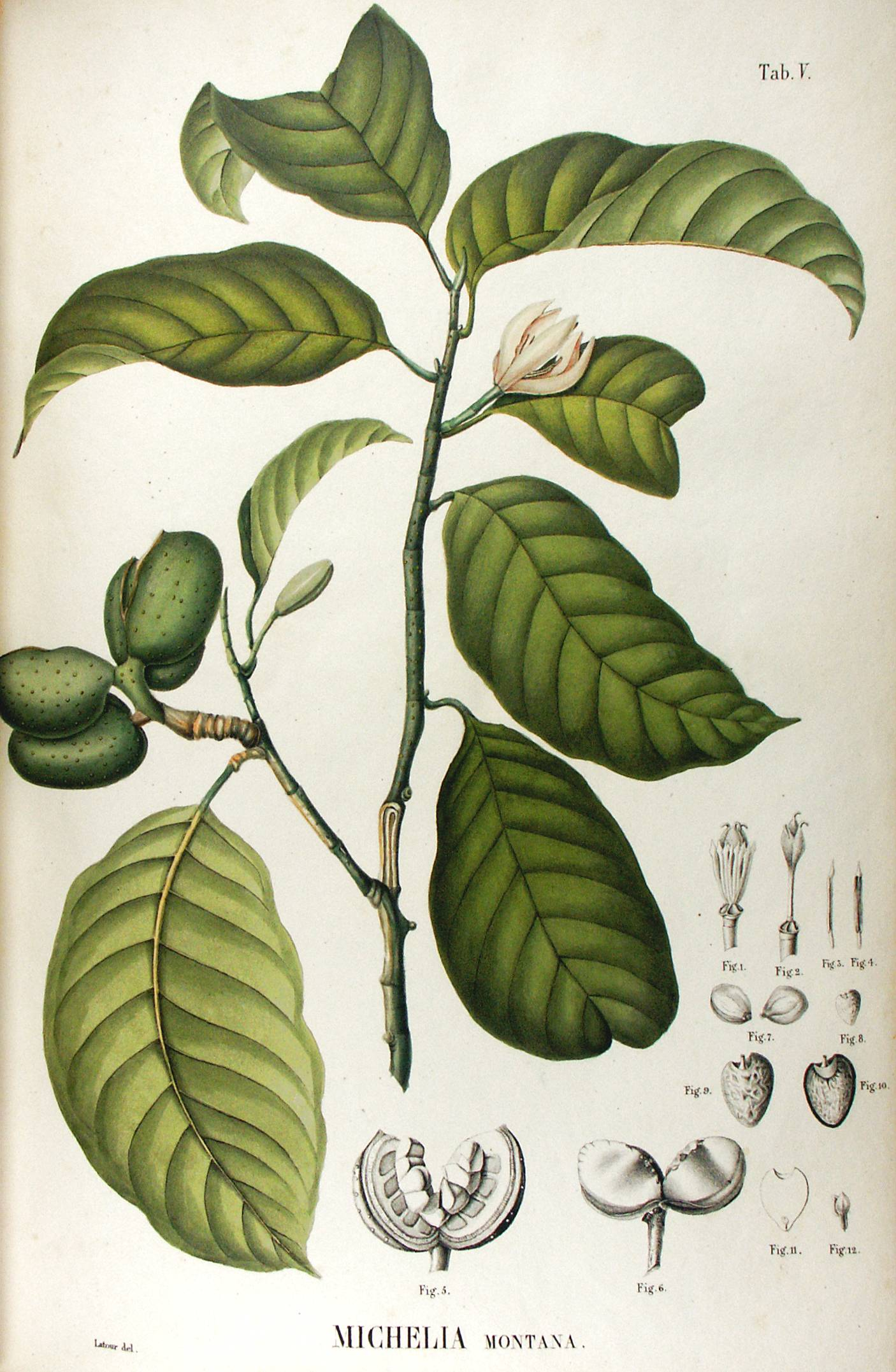

Scientific classification
- Kingdom: Plantae
- Clade: Embryophytes
- Clade: Tracheophytes
- Clade: Spermatophytes
- Clade: Angiosperms
- Clade: Magnoliids
- Order: Magnoliales
- Family: Magnoliaceae
- Genus: Magnolia
- Subgenus: Magnolia subg. Yulania
- Section: Magnolia sect. Michelia
- Subsection: Magnolia subsect. Michelia
- Species: M. montana

Binomial name
- Magnolia montana (Blume) Figlar

Synonyms
- Michelia montana Blume; Michelia montana var. subvelutina Miq.; Sampacca montana (Blume) Kuntze; Michelia ecicatrisata Miq.

= Magnolia montana =

Species of flowering plant

Magnolia montana is a species of Magnolia. It is a tree native to western Malesia – Peninsular Malaysia, Borneo, Sumatra, Java, and Bali.

The Latin specific epithet montana refers to mountains or coming from mountains.
