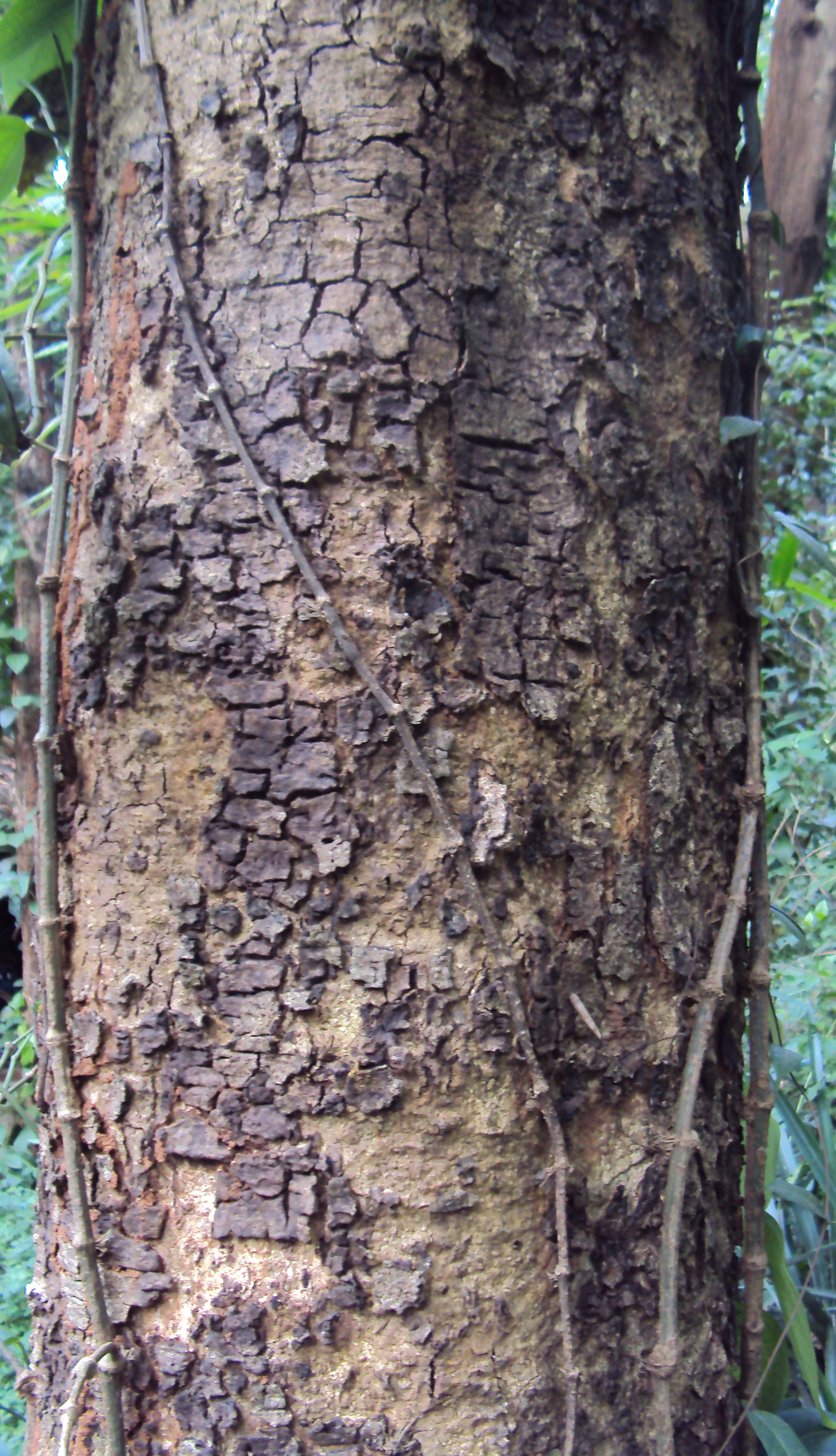
- Bark of Albizia chinensis

Conservation status
- Least Concern (IUCN 3.1)

Scientific classification
- Kingdom: Plantae
- Clade: Embryophytes
- Clade: Tracheophytes
- Clade: Angiosperms
- Clade: Eudicots
- Clade: Rosids
- Order: Fabales
- Family: Fabaceae
- Subfamily: Caesalpinioideae
- Clade: Mimosoid clade
- Genus: Albizia
- Species: A. chinensis

Binomial name
- Albizia chinensis (Osbeck) Merr.

Synonyms
- List: Acacia auriculata Buch.-Ham. ex Wall.; Acacia gualparensis Steud.; Acacia lomatocarpa DC.; Acacia marginata Buch.-Ham.; Acacia smithiana (Roxb.) Steud.; Acacia stipulata DC.; Albizia chinensis var. smithiana (Roxb.) K.C.Shani, S.Chawla & S.Bannet; Albizia marginata (Lam.) Merr.; Albizia minyi De Wild.; Albizia purpurascens Blume ex Miq.; Albizia smithiana Benth.; Albizia stipulata (DC.) Boivin; Feuilleea stipulata (DC.) Kuntze; Inga dimidiata Miq.; Inga purpurascens Hassk.; Inga umbraculiformis Jungh.; Mimosa chinensis Osbeck; Mimosa marginata Lam.; Mimosa smithiana Roxb.; Mimosa stipulacea Roxb.; Mimosa stipulata Roxb.

= Albizia chinensis =

Species of legume

Albizia chinensis is a species of legume in the genus Albizia, native to South and Southeast Asia, from India to China and Indonesia.

The genus is named after the Italian nobleman Filippo degli Albizzi, belonging to the famous Florentine family Albizzi, who introduced it to Europe in the mid-18th century, and it is sometimes incorrectly spelled Albizzia.

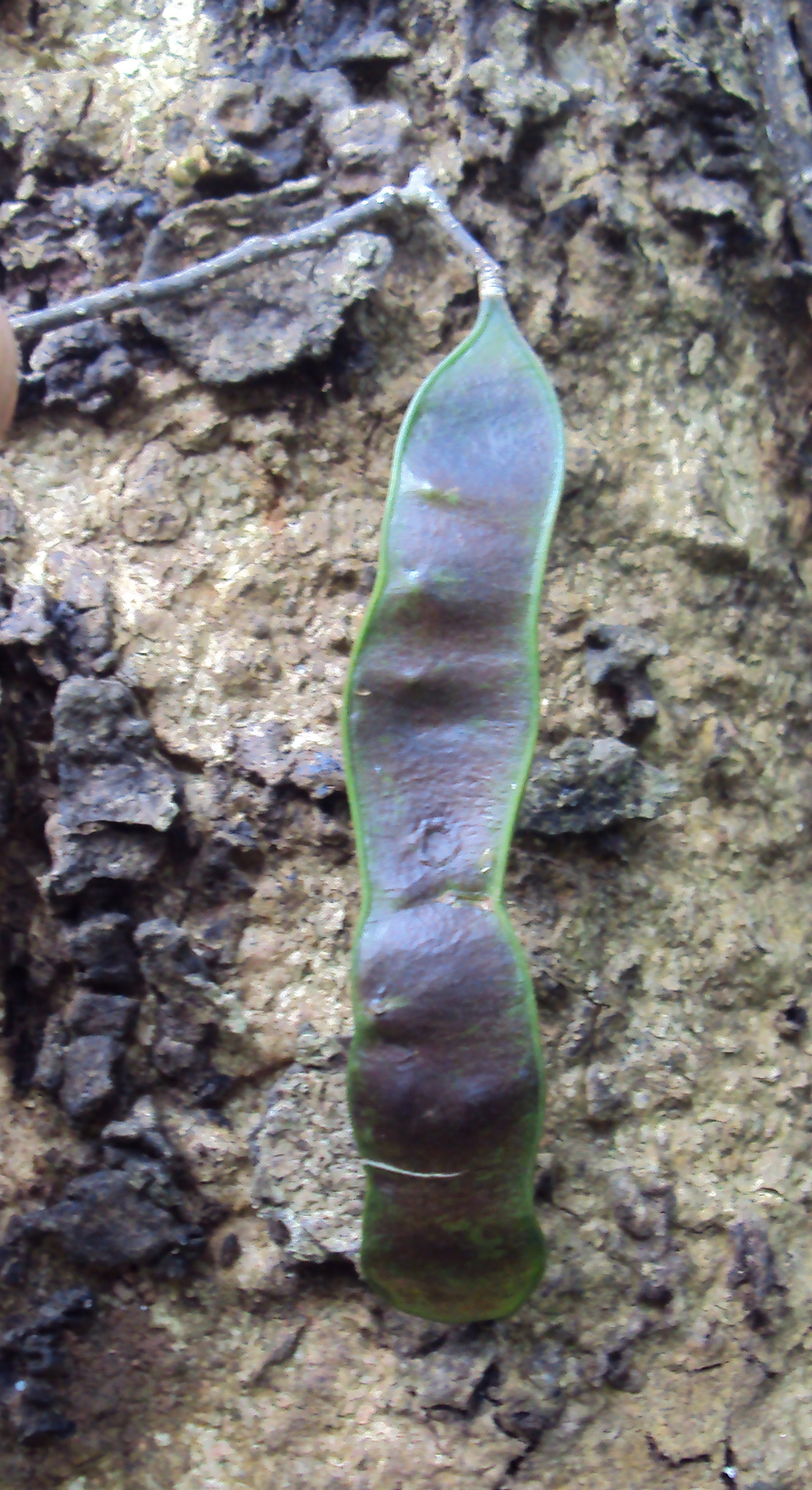
Seed pod of Albizia chinensis

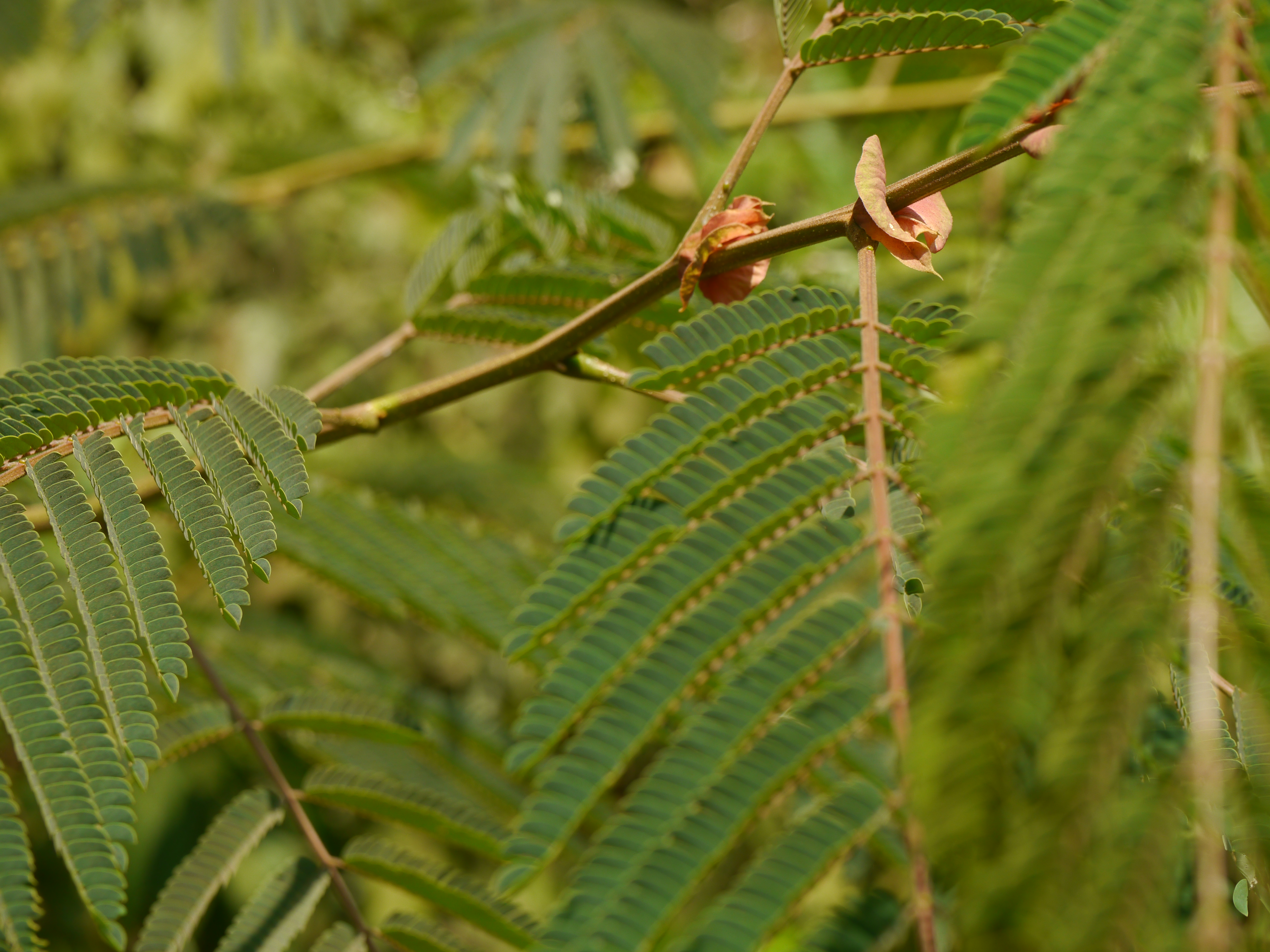
Albizia chinensis leaves

== Description ==
Albizia chinensis is a deciduous or evergreen tree that reaches a height of up to 30–43 m (100–140 ft). Its trunk has a diameter up to 1–2 m (3 ft 3 in – 6 ft 7 in). Its flowers are stalked heads that aggregate into a yellow panicle. The fruits are indehiscent pods.

== Uses ==
Albizia chinensis is a browse tree, its leaves being readily eaten by goats, but they rarely touch its bark since it contains saponin. It is also a shade tree in plantations. It can be planted as an ornamental tree.
