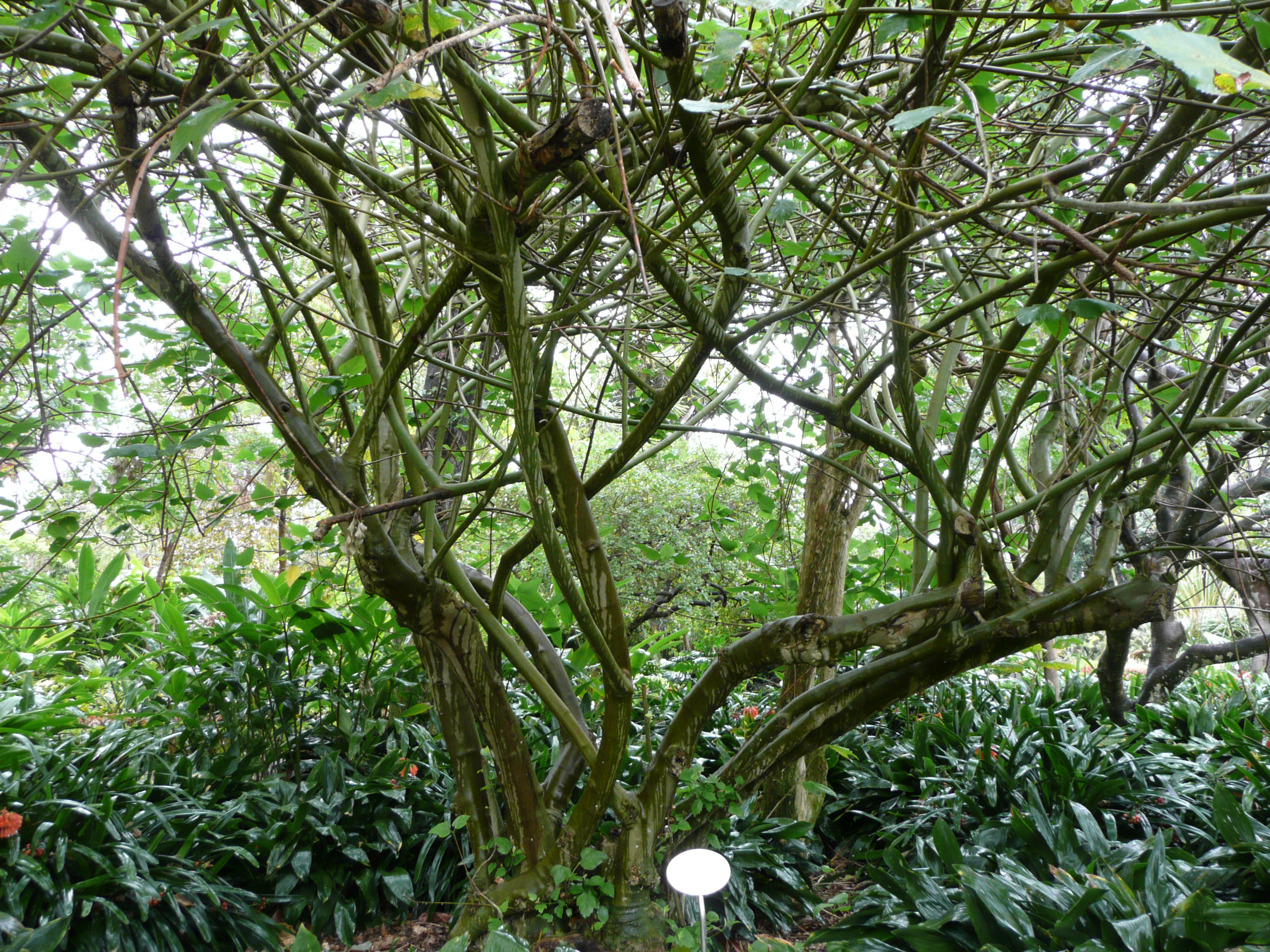

Conservation status
- Least Concern (IUCN 3.1)

Scientific classification
- Kingdom: Plantae
- Clade: Tracheophytes
- Clade: Angiosperms
- Clade: Eudicots
- Clade: Rosids
- Order: Rosales
- Family: Moraceae
- Genus: Ficus
- Subgenus: F. subg. Ficus
- Species: F. palmata

Binomial name
- Ficus palmata Forssk.

Subspecies
- Ficus palmata subsp. palmata; Ficus palmata subsp. virgata Browicz

Synonyms
- synonyms of subsp. palmata: Ficus forskaolii Vahl, nom. illeg. superfl.; Ficus malabarica Miq.; Ficus morifolia Forssk.; Ficus palmata var. petitiana (A.Rich.) Fiori; Ficus petitiana A.Rich.; Ficus pseudocarica var. tomentosa A.Rich.; synonyms of subsp. virgata: Ficus caricoides Roxb.; Ficus pseudocarica Miq.; Ficus pseudosycomorus Decne.; Ficus urticifolia Roxb.; Ficus virgata Roxb., nom. illeg. homonym. post.

= Ficus palmata =

Species of fig tree

Ficus palmata, commonly known as Punjab fig or "Bedu", is a species of flowering plant in the family Moraceae. It is a shrub or tree native to southern Egypt to north-eastern tropical Africa and the Arabian Peninsula, and southeastern Iran to Afghanistan, Pakistan, northern India, and Nepal. It has edible fruit.

== Description ==
Ficus palmata grows as a shrub or tree, growing up to 10 metres (30 ft) tall. The fruits, which turn purplish on maturing, measure up to 2 cm (1 in) long. The flowers are greenish white.

== Taxonomy ==
It was first published by Peter Forsskål in Fl. Aegypt.-Arab. on page 179 in 1775.

It is also known as the Wild Himalayan fig.

== Subspecies ==
There are 2 known subspecies:

- Ficus palmata subsp. palmata – southeastern Egypt to northeastern tropical Africa and the Arabian Peninsula
- Ficus palmata subsp. virgata Browicz – Sinai to northwestern Saudi Arabia, and southeastern Iran to Nepal

== Distribution and habitat ==
Ficus palmata is native to north-eastern Africa from southeastern Egypt south to Somalia, to the Sinai, southern Levant, and Arabian Peninsula, and from southeastern Iran to Afghanistan, Pakistan, and northern India to Nepal.

It grows in tropical and subtropical desert and dry shrubland from 1,000–2,400 m (3,000–8,000 ft) elevation, including near villages in the Himalayas.

== Uses ==
In the Himalayan region, its fruit is widely sold and consumed. The whole fruit, including the seeds are edible. The fruits are used in folk medicine to treat inflammation, pathogenic bacterial ailments and be used as an analgesic (Shi et al. 2014).
