= Moilang =

Clan of the Indian ethnic group, Meetei

Moilang (Modern Meitei: Moirang)
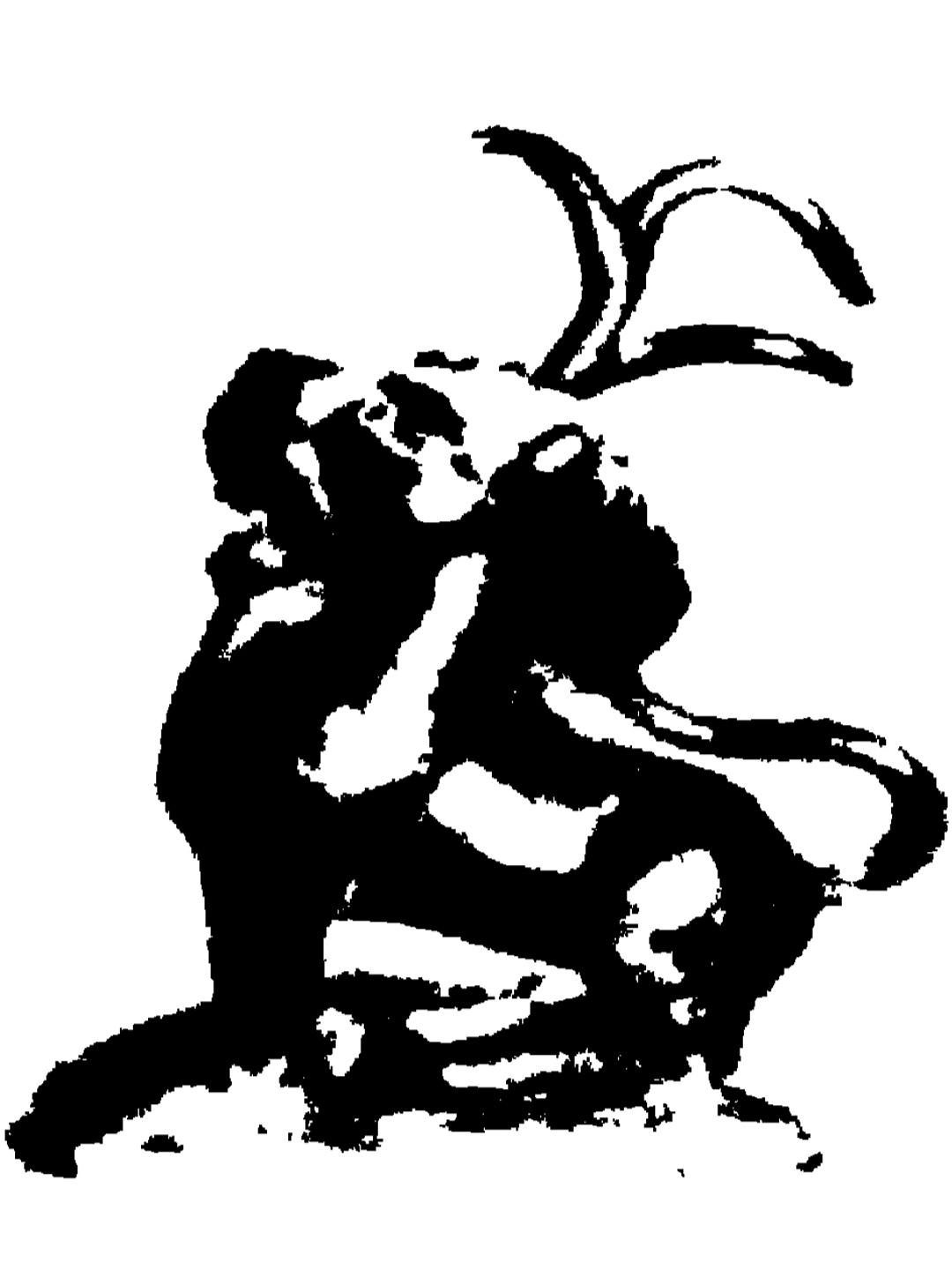
- A holy tiger of Ancient Moirang, having 3 pronged tips of a single horn on its forehead, the front one in brass color, the middle one in golden color & the last one in silver color

Profile
- Country: India
- Region: Manipur
- District: Bishnupur district
- Ethnicity: Meitei people

Chief
- Moirang Iputhou
Clan branches
#Number of families
Titles
Moirang

Moilang (Modern Meitei: Moirang) is a group of people, which is recognized as one of the seven Yek Salai clans of the composite Meitei confederacy. Moirang consists of many several Yumnaks which are native peoples of ancient Kangleipak (now Manipur), one of the states of India. Moirang has a classical cultural heritage as reflected in Khamba and Thoibi.

In the flag of Kangleipak, the pink color represents the Moilang group of Meitei people.

== Number of families ==
| Meitei sub-groups | Romanisation | Number of families/surnames (according to N. Monihar) | Number of families/surnames (according to Khomdon Lisam) | Number of families/surnames (according to T.C. Hodson) | Number of families/surnames (according to Manipur Mirror) | Number of families/surnames (according to MASTEC) |
|---|---|---|---|---|---|---|
| ꯃꯣꯏꯔꯥꯡ (ꯃꯣꯏꯂꯥꯡ) | Moirang (Moilang) | 100 | 110 | 66 | 99 | 67 |

== See also ==
- Mangang
- Luwang
- Khuman
- Angom
- Kha Nganpa
- Salai Leishangthem
