= Giant cane =

Giant cane is a common name for several plants and may refer to:

- Arundinaria gigantea
- Arundo donax
