= Luwang =

Clan of the Indian ethnic group, Meetei

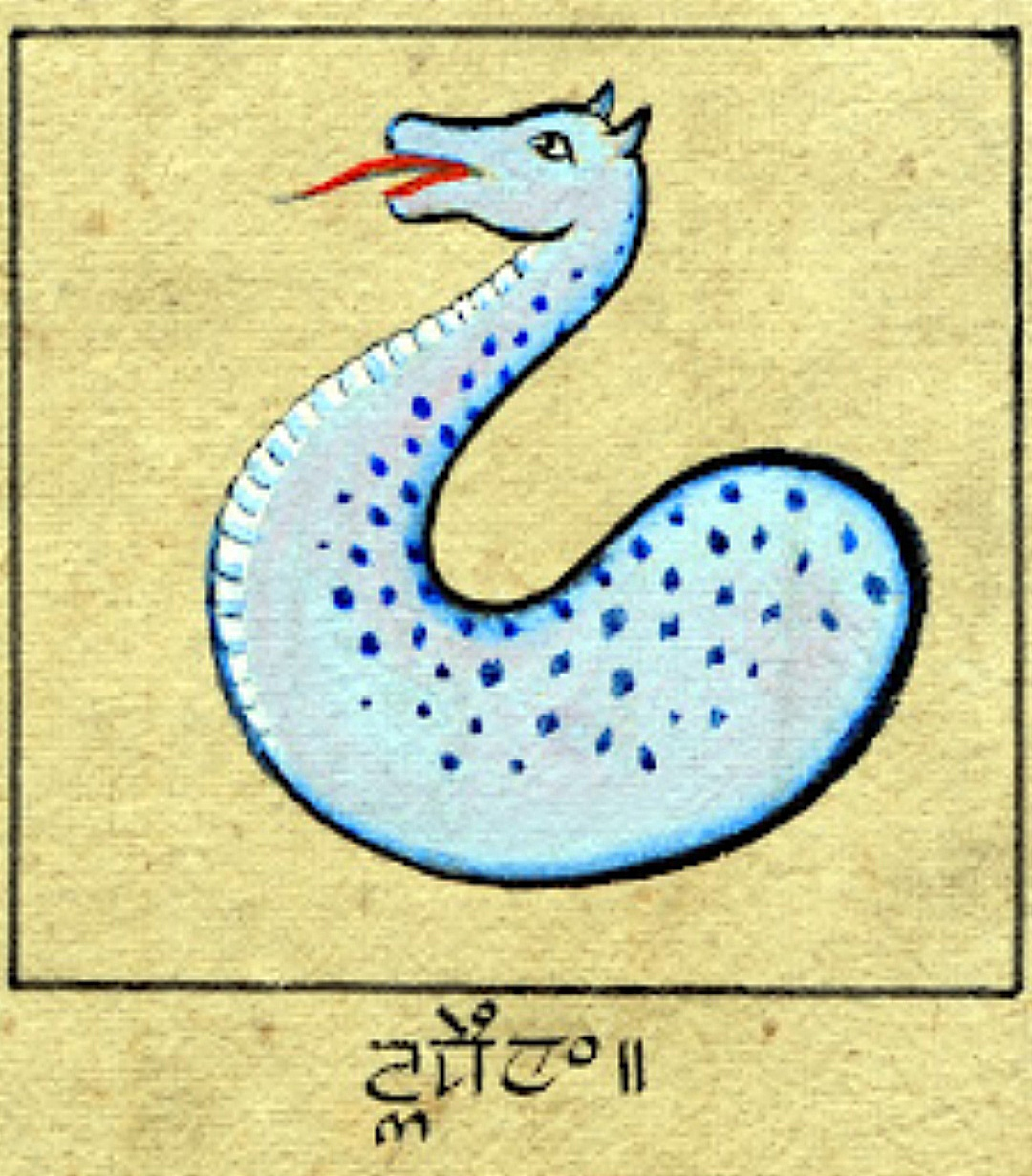
- A Classical Meitei illuminated manuscript painting, depicting a “Paphal” of the Luwang totem of a Meitei dragon, from the “Pakhangba Lambuba”, an Ancient Meitei language text, engraved in traditional Meetei Mayek script

Profile
- Country: India
- Region: Manipur
- Ethnicity: Meitei people

Chief
- Luwang Iputhou
Clan branches
#Number of families
Titles
Luwangcha

Luwang (Meitei: ꯂꯨꯋꯥꯡ) is a group of people, which is recognized as one of the seven Yek Salai clans of the composite Meitei confederacy. Luwang consists of several Yumnaks which are native peoples of ancient Kangleipak (now Manipur), one of the States of India.

In the flag of Kangleipak, the white color represents the Luwang group of Meitei people.

== Origin ==
Luwang was the son of Iputhou Pakhangba also known as Konchin Tukthapa Pakhangpa and Nula Eebemma Huimuleima. He was born inside Kangla Palace, Imphal at noon where sunlight was somewhat white in colour. He ruled some parts of Kangleipak kingdom for several years. Luwang Punsiba was one of the great king amongst Luwang clan. During his reign Hiyang Hiren was most popular in Kangleipak.

== Number of families ==
Meitei sub-groups	Romanisation	Number of families/surnames (according to N. Monihar)	Number of families/surnames (according to Khomdon Lisam)	Number of families/surnames (according to T.C. Hodson)	Number of families/surnames (according to Manipur Mirror)	Number of families/surnames (according to MASTEC)
ꯂꯨꯋꯥꯡ	Luwang	105	93	56	106	58

== Yumnaks of Luwang ==
The following are list of Yumnaks(surnames)included in the Luwangsalai.

- Abujam
- Achoibam
- Achoibam [angom]
- Angambam
- Arambam
- Arekpam
- Arubam
- Asangbam [moirang]
- Asangwangbam
- Athokcham
- Ayekpam [mangang] [khabanganba] [leisangthem]
- Chingjabam
- Chinggaibam
- Chongtham [khabanganba] [leisangthem]
- Haorongbam [moirang]
- Haikham
- Heikham
- Heikam
- Hijam
- Hinaosabam
- Hingkhangbam
- Huirongbam Salam
- Ichom
- Kambongmayum
- Khoibam [angom]
- Khoknam
- Khugam
- Khujammayum
- Khumukcham [khuman] [khabanganba]
- Koijam
- Kongpacham
- Laikangbam
- Laaikhonglembam
- Lairenjam [moirang]
- Lairongjam
- Laisom
- Lakpamsabam
- Lierongjam
- Lorengbam
- Loukhambam
- Loupam
- Lusangbam
- Luwangsangbam
- Mayengbam
- Maisnam/Meisnam
- Meitram
- Ngoubam
- Nahakpam
- Nambam
- Naoroibam
- Naoroijam
- Ningchitpam
- Ningachikpam
- Ngangbam
- Nganglom
- Ngangom
- Nongpokpam
- Nongthombam
- Phamihanbam
- Phampibam
- Pheiroijam
- Pungkraijam
- Sakokpam
- Salam
- Sambakram
- Sambangsam
- Selam
- Senjam
- Shithangkham
- Shithangkham [moirang]
- Soram
- Soubam
- Takhelmayum
- Thamangcham
- Thamangbam
- Thanangcham
- Thangjam [khuman] [angom] [moirang] [leisangthem]
- Thangjamsoram
- Thangjamhumukcham
- Thaoroijam
- Thaoteibam
- Thiyam
- Thounaojam
- Tinbijam
- Toibijam
- Toijham
- Toumom
- Tourem [khuman]
- Urikkhinbam
- Urepkhinbam
- Usham
- Wahengbam
- Waikhom
- Wakonthem
- Wanglenbam [moirang]
- Wanglelbam [angom]
- Wanglempam
- Yangambam
- Yangkampam
- Yangkopam
- Yelangbam [khabanganba] [leisangthem]
- Yendrembam
- Yoirelkbam
- Yumlembam

== See also ==
- Luwang Huiningsumba
- Mangang
- Khuman
- Angom
- Moirang
- Kha Nganpa
- Salai Leishangthem
