= Angom =

Clan of the Indian ethnic group, Meetei

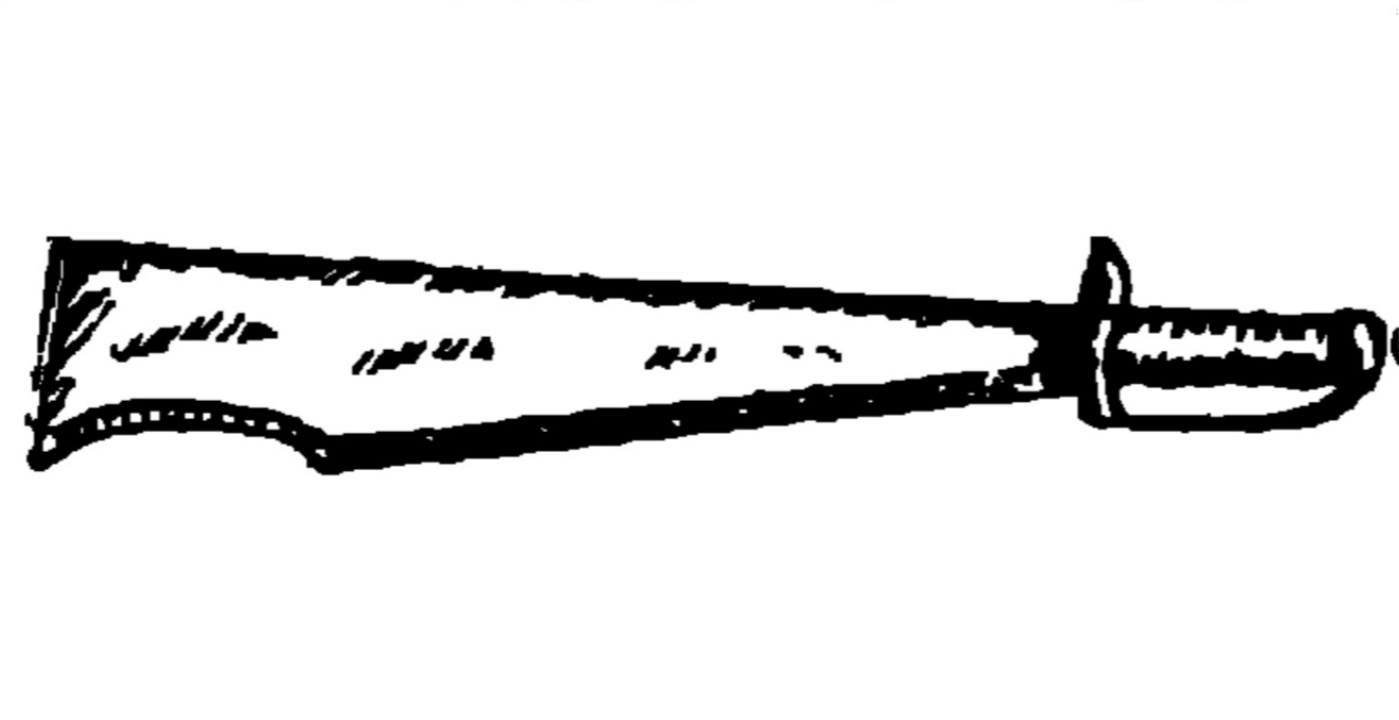
- Angom dynasty sword, a Meitei traditional weapon

Profile
- Country: India
- Region: Manipur
- Ethnicity: Meitei people

Chief
- Angom Iputhou
Clan branches
#Number of families
Titles
Angomcha

Angom (Meitei: ꯑꯉꯣꯝ) is a group of people, which is recognized as one of the seven Yek Salai clans of the composite Meitei confederacy. It consists of several Yumnaks, which belong to the native people of ancient Kangleipak (present day Manipur state of India).

In the flag of Kangleipak, the yellow color represents the Angom group of Meitei people.

== Number of families ==
Meitei sub-groups	Romanisation	Number of families/surnames (according to N. Monihar)	Number of families/surnames (according to Khomdon Lisam)	Number of families/surnames (according to T.C. Hodson)	Number of families/surnames (according to Manipur Mirror)	Number of families/surnames (according to MASTEC)
ꯑꯉꯣꯝ	Angom	96	109	50	103	62

== See also ==
- Mangang
- Luwang
- Khuman
- Moilang
- Kha Nganpa
- Salai Leishangthem
