= Mangang =

Clan of the Indian ethnic group, Meetei

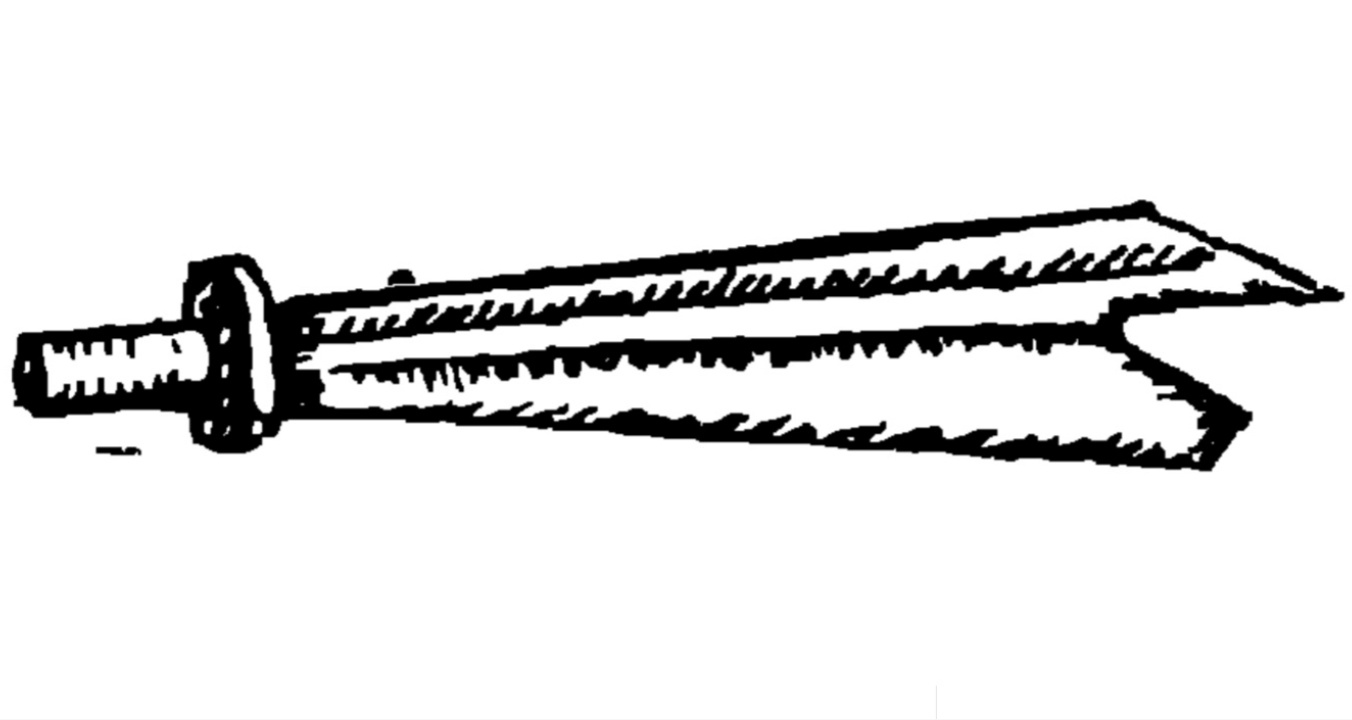
- Mangang clan sword, a Meitei traditional weapon

Profile
- Country: India
- Region: Manipur
- Ethnicity: Meetei

Chief
- Mangang Iputhou
Clan branches
#Number of families
Titles
Mangangcha

Mangang (Meitei: ꯃꯉꯥꯡ) is a group of people, which is recognized as one of the seven Yek Salai clans of the composite Meitei confederacy. It consists of several Yumnaks, which belong to the native people of ancient Kangleipak (now Manipur), one of the states of India.

In the flag of Kangleipak, the red color represents the Mangang group of Meitei people.

== Number of families ==
Meitei sub-groups	Romanisation	Number of families/surnames (according to N. Monihar)	Number of families/surnames (according to Khomdon Lisam)	Number of families/surnames (according to T.C. Hodson)	Number of families/surnames (according to Manipur Mirror)	Number of families/surnames (according to MASTEC)
ꯅꯤꯡꯊꯧꯖꯥ (ꯃꯉꯥꯡ)	Ningthouja (Mangang)	256	234	115	254	125

== See also ==
- Meitei surnames
- Luwang
- Khuman
- Angom
- Moilang
- Kha Nganpa
- Salai Leishangthem
