= Khuman =

Clan of the Indian ethnic group, Meetei

Khuman 1300 BCE-1800 CE
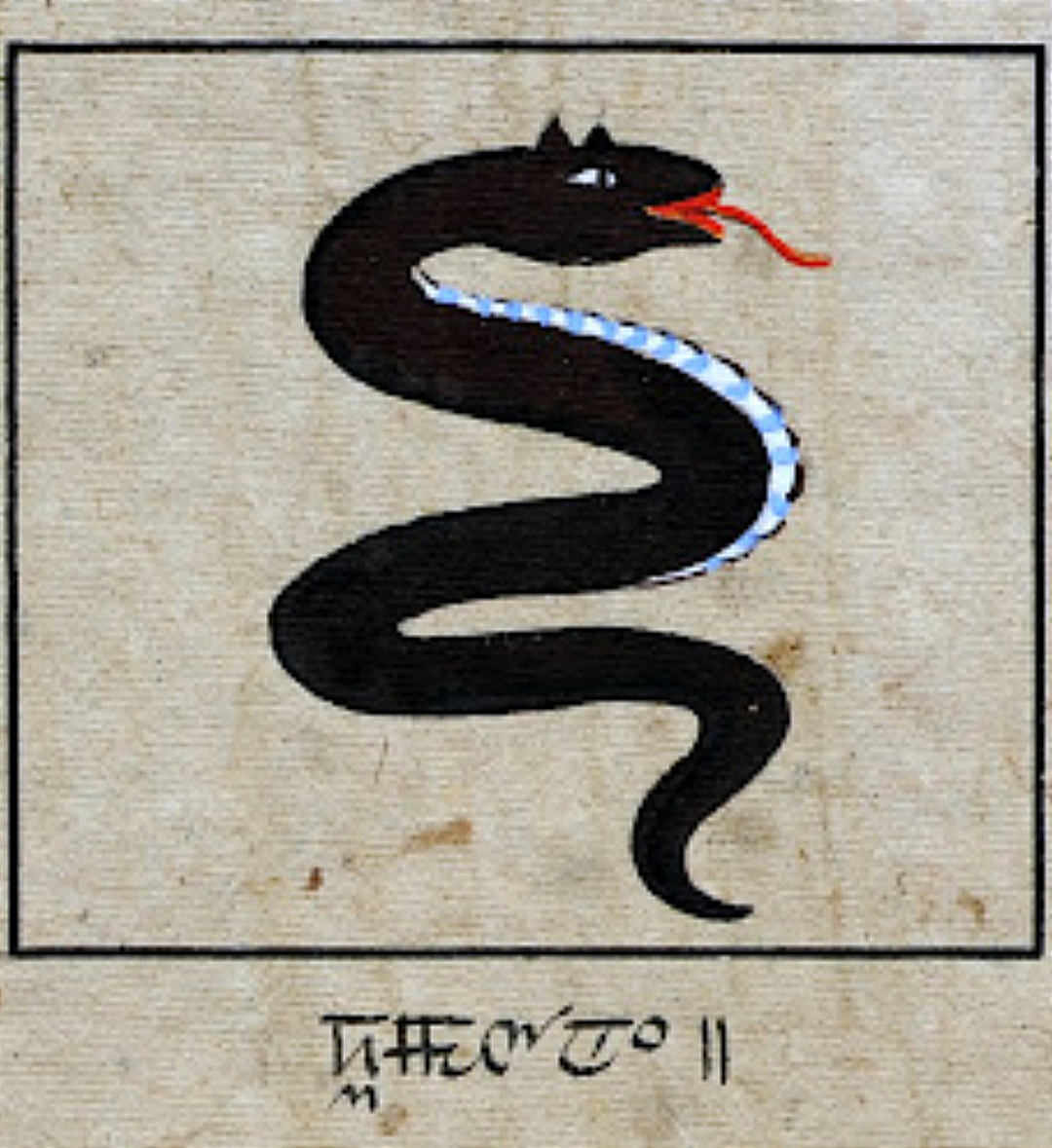
- A Classical Meitei illuminated manuscript painting, depicting a “Paphal” of the Khuman totem of a Meitei dragon, from the “Pakhangba Lambuba”, an Ancient Meitei language text, engraved in traditional Meetei Mayek script

Profile
- Country: Kangleipak (historic); India (present)
- Region: Manipur
- District: Thoubal district
- Ethnicity: Meitei people

Chief
- Khuman Iputhou
- Khuman Ningthou
- Historic seat: Mayang Imphal
- Died: 1760 CE
Clan branches
#Number of families
Titles
Khumancha

Khuman (Meitei: ꯈꯨꯃꯟ) is a group of people, which is recognized as one of the seven Yek Salai clans of the composite Meitei confederacy. Historically, they ruled parts of Kangleipak (present day Indian state of Manipur) prior to subjugation by the Ningthouja dynasty (Mangang) c. 13th century. The Khuman-Lon Puya records information about their rule. The Meitei language meaning of Khuman is a narrowed darkness.

In the flag of Kangleipak, the black color represents the Khuman group of Meitei people.

== Number of families ==
Meitei sub-groups	Romanisation	Number of families/surnames (according to N. Monihar)	Number of families/surnames (according to Khomdon Lisam)	Number of families/surnames (according to T.C. Hodson)	Number of families/surnames (according to Manipur Mirror)	Number of families/surnames (according to MASTEC)
ꯈꯨꯃꯟ	Khuman	176	199	103	204	67

== Mythology ==
Khuman was the son of Iputhou Pakhangba and Loikhumpi Mawai Thoungailenpi. He was born inside Kangla Palace, Imphal at evening when sunset sky is somewhat dark in colour. He ruled the Mayang Imphal province of Kangleipak kingdom as the Khuman province for several years. Khuman Khamba, one of legendary powerful hero from Moirang was amongst Khuman Salai(clan).

== See also ==
- Khuman martial tradition
- Mangang
- Luwang
- Angom
- Moilang
- Kha Nganpa
- Salai Leishangthem
