= Kuki-Zo Council =

Kuki-Zo civil society organisation in Manipur, India

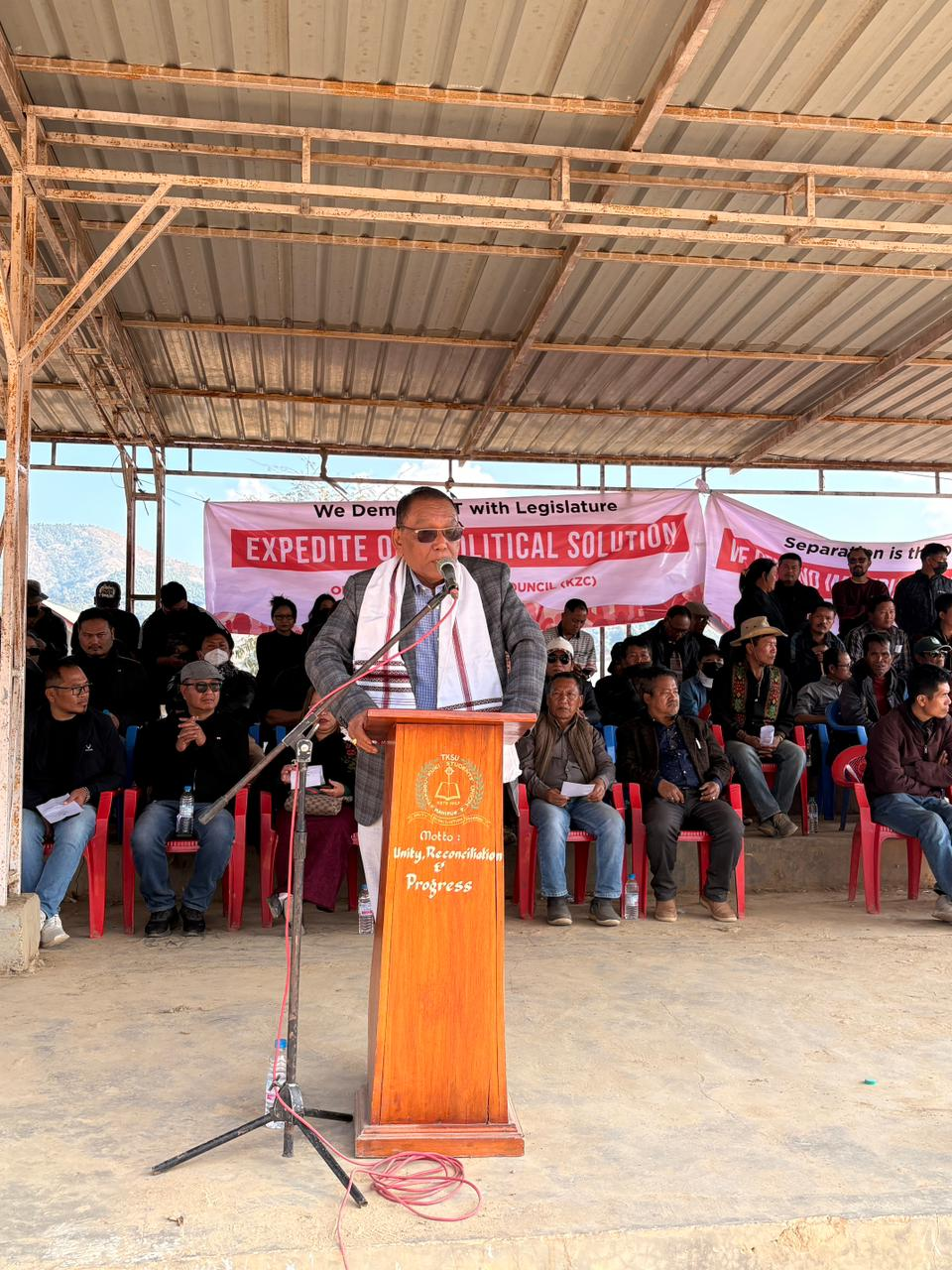
- Chairman addressing a rally in 2026
- Founded: 11 October 2024
- Type: umbrella organisation
- Purpose: Welfare of the Kuki-Zo community
- Headquarters: Churachandpur, Manipur
- Region served: Manipur, India
- Chairman: Henlianthang Thanglet
- Chief of Governing Council: Ch. Ajang Khongsai
- Secretary: Thangzamang Zou

The Kuki-Zo Council is a joint body of Kuki-Zo tribal leaders in Manipur, India. It formed in October 2024 during the ongoing 2023–2026 Manipur violence, amid allegations by Kuki-Zo organisations that the Manipur state government had targeted their community. During the previous months, the community was represented by Indigenous Tribal Leaders' Forum (ITLF) in the Churachandpur district and the Committee on Tribal Unity (CoTU) in the Kangpokpi district.

== Background ==
The Kuki-Zo people of Manipur, divided into multiple tribes, were riven by internal divisions since the independence of India. Many of the tribes were not comfortable with the term "Kuki" introduced during the British Raj and sought an alternative label. They were also afraid of domination by the Thadou Kukis, who make up roughly half of the entire community. The Old Kukis separated out during the 1940s and the other tribes, with the exception of Thadou Kukis, formed a Zomi umbrella in the 1990s. The Thadou Kukis stood alone in continuing the use of the "Kuki" label.

Virtually all tribes formed their own armed groups during the 1990s, for the purpose of protecting their own tribal communities. In the course of negotiating a Suspension of Operations (SoO) agreement with the Government of India, the armed groups gathered into two umbrella organisations called Kuki National Organisation and United People's Front. They also began to address themselves as "Kuki/Zo people", later changed to "Kuki-Zo people".

With these antecedents, efforts toward a broader reunification of the Kuki-Zo tribes was contemplated. The Indigenous Tribal Leaders' Forum (ITLF) was formed on 9 June 2022, with an office based in the Kuki Inpi–Churachandpur complex in Tuibong (northern part of the Churachandpur town). It brought under its umbrella existing tribal organisations such as Kuki Inpi Manipur, Paite Tribe Council, Simte Tribe Council, Vaiphei People's Council, Mizo People's Convention, Hmar Inpui, United Zou Organisation and Gangte Tribe Union (representing the communities of Thadou Kukis, Paites, Simtes, Vaipheis, Mizos, Hmars, Zous and Gangtes respectively). (Note: The ITLF is thus representative of all the Kuki-Zo tribes in Manipur, in contrast to the Kuki Inpi Manipur, which represents the clans accepting the "Kuki" label (which is only Thadou Kukis in practice).)

In April 2023, the chief minister N. Biren Singh questioned the "indigenousness" of the organisation. (In his view, the Kuki-Zo tribes were not "indigenous" to Manipur.)

In the course of the 2023–2025 Manipur violence, the term "Kuki-Zo people" gained wider usage, as a more inclusive alternative to "Kuki people". Other alternatives such as "Kuki-Zomi", "Kuki-Zomi-Hmar" and "Kuki-Zomi-Hmar-Paite" were also tried, but "Kuki-Zo" was preferred for its brevity and inclusiveness. (Note: All the tribes reportedly accept being part of the broader "Zo" community.)

== Establishment ==
The formation of the Kuki-Zo Council was announced on 11 October 2024, which was described as a "significant milestone" for the Kuki-Zo community. The Council was composed of representatives from various Kuki-Zo tribes and Inpis (governing councils). The Council members elected five members to lead the Council: Henlianthang Thanglet (Vaiphei) as the president, Ch. Ajang Khongsai as the chief of the Governing Council, Thangzamang Zou as secretary, G. S. Gangte as finance secretary and Khaikhohauh Gangte as information secretary. A press release said that the Council would act as a formal governing body with tribe presidents and Inpi representatives playing active roles in governance and decision-making.

In December 2024, the Kuki-Zo Council convened a general body meeting attended by more than 100 delegates. It was noted that the Council incorporates representatives from every tribe and Inpi organisation, with each president serving on the governing council.

On 17 January 2025, the leaders of Kuki-Zo Council met the Union Ministry of Home Affairs (MHA) officials in their first formal engagement. The Council delegates emphasised the need for early political dialogue. The MHA officials reportedly asked for cessation of violence as a pre-requisite. Council delegates stated that any cessation demand should apply equally to Meitei and Kuki-Zo groups The Council submitted a list of demands to MHA, which included separate administration for Kuki-Zo, improved medical facilities and lasting peace.

== See also ==
- Kuki Inpi Manipur
- Coordinating Committee on Manipur Integrity
- International Meeteis Forum
