= Indigenous Tribal Leaders' Forum =

Kuki-Zo civil society organisation in Manipur, India

- Founded: 9 June 2022
- Type: umbrella organisation
- Purpose: Welfare of the Kuki-Zo community
- Headquarters: Tuibong, Churachandpur, Manipur
- Region served: Manipur, India
- Chairman: Pagin Haokip
- Secretary: Muan Tombing
- Spokesperson: Ginza Vualzong
- Website: www.itlfmediacell.com

The Indigenous Tribal Leaders' Forum (ITLF) is a joint body of Kuki-Zo tribal leaders in the Indian state of Manipur. It came into being in 2022 in the wake of the Manipur government's assault on tribal land rights in protected forests. During the 2023–2025 Manipur violence, ITLF served as the main representative body of the Kuki-Zo tribes in Manipur.

== Background ==
The Kuki-Zo people of Manipur, divided into multiple tribes, were riven by internal divisions since the independence of India. Many of the tribes were not comfortable with the term "Kuki" introduced during the British Raj and sought an alternative label. They were also afraid of domination by the Thadou Kukis, who make up roughly half of the entire community. The Old Kukis separated out during the 1940s and the other tribes, with the exception of Thadou Kukis, formed a Zomi umbrella in the 1990s. The Thadou Kukis stood alone in continuing the use of the "Kuki" label.

Virtually all tribes formed their own armed groups during the 1990s, for the purpose of protecting their own tribal communities. In the course of negotiating a Suspension of Operations (SoO) agreement with the Government of India, the armed groups gathered into two umbrella organisations called Kuki National Organisation and United People's Front. They also began to address themselves as "Kuki/Zo people", later changed to "Kuki-Zo people".

With these antecedents, some sort of reunion of all the Kuki-Zo tribes was contemplated.

== Organisation ==
The Indigenous Tribal Leaders' Forum (ITLF) was formed on 9 June 2022, with an office based in the Kuki Inpi–Churachandpur complex in Tuibong (northern part of the Churachandpur town). It brought under its umbrella existing tribal organisations such as Kuki Inpi Manipur, Paite Tribe Council, Simte Tribe Council, Vaiphei People's Council, Mizo People's Convention, Hmar Inpui, United Zou Organisation and Gangte Tribe Union (representing the communities of Thadou Kukis, Paites, Simtes, Vaipheis, Mizos, Hmars, Zous and Gangtes respectively). (Note: The ITLF is thus representative of all the Kuki-Zo tribes in Manipur, in contrast to the Kuki Inpi Manipur, which represents the clans accepting the "Kuki" label (which is only Thadou Kukis in practice).)

The description "Indigenous" was chosen presumably to avoid disputes regarding tribal identities. In April 2023, the chief minister N. Biren Singh questioned the "indigenousness" of the organisation. (In his view, the Kuki-Zo tribes were not indigenous to Manipur.)

== Activities ==
=== Campaign against evictions ===
During the second Biren Singh government, formed in 2022, the Kuki-Zo community came under increasing assault by the government and the dominant Meitei civil society organisations, with accusations of "poppy cultivators", "illegal immigrants" and "forest encroachers". On 7 November 2022, the state government issued an "office memorandum" cancelling the recognition of all the villages embedded in the Churachandpur-Khoupum Protected Forest, putting the land rights of those villages in jeopardy. A village called K. Songjang was "evicted" (bulldozed) by the government in February 2023, labelling it as an illegal encroachment into the protected forest.

On 10 March 2023, ITLF organised a rally in conjunction with the Kuki Students Organisation in all the Kuki-inhabited hill districts to protest the government's approach to tribal land rights. The government imposed prohibitory orders under Section 144, which were ignored by the rallyists. In the Kangpokpi area, the police tried to block the rally, which enraged the mob and the rally "turned violent". At least five protesters and a few policemen were injured. The state cabinet and alleged that the protests were "unconstitutional" and that people were encroaching into protected forests and reserved forests for poppy plantation and drugs business. The chief minister also alleged that the rallies were influenced by Kuki-Zo militants that were under the Suspension of Operations (SoO) agreement and withdrew from the SoO agreement with the two largest militant groups.

Another protest was planned by ITLF in Churachandpur on 28 April 2023, which was withdrawn by ITLF as the mobs had turned violent. On the preceding day, the mob set fire to a venue that was to be attended by the Chief Minister. Once again prohibitory orders were issued, and internet services were suspended in the Churachandpur district for a period of five days.

=== 2023–2025 ethnic violence ===
On 3 May 2023, following a rally in the Churachandpur Town to protest the Meitei demand for Scheduled Tribe (ST) status, ethnic violence broke out between the Meitei and Kuki-Zo communities at the Churachandpur–Bishnupur district border. It quickly spiralled out of control and engulfed the whole state, lasting for almost two years. The ITLF took charge to speak on behalf of the Kuki-Zo community, issuing regular press statements and responding to the developments.

The onset of the violence was attributed by ITLF to a rumour that the Anglo-Kuki War Memorial Gate at Leisang was burnt down by (presumably Meitei) miscreants. (Note: The rumour was false. A fire was indeed started at the base of the gate, which however caused only scant damage to the gate itself.) By the end of the month, ITLF was countering allegations from the chief minister that the security forces were battling the "Kuki militants". It levelled the counter-allegation that Manipur Police Commandos were leading Meitei mobs in launching attacks against the Kukis, and Kuki village volunteers were defending themselves with licensed guns. ThePrint quoted a central forces officer who backed the Kuki version of the events. In June, the organisation called for the imposition of President's Rule in the state. It claimed to have enough evidence of the state government's complicity in allowing radical groups to have a free rein on the people. It called for "total separation" of the administration of Kuki-Zo tribals from the state of Manipur. The organisation also countered the declaration of "Manipuri national war" by the Meitei organisation COCOMI, calling it "propaganda to mobilise mobs [..] for attacks on Kuki-Zo villages".

In August 2023, ITLF proposed to hold mass burial of 35 Kuki victims of the Manipur violence at the "Haolai Khopi" village (next to Torbung Bangla, a Meitei village that was mostly burnt down and deserted). The proposal led to widespread consternation among the Meitei community, and the state government deployed the Rapid Action Force to guard the site. The ITLF Women's Wing stuck to its stand, claiming "this land belongs to us" and "we can bury our martyrs at any place". It seemed as if ITLF was marking territory, as these villages are in the geographical precincts of Churachandpur district, even though several newspapers were led to believe that it was in an "area bordering the Churachandpur district with Bishnupur district". (Note: The Torbung Bangla is well within the Churachandpur district as per the authentic maps prepared by Manipur Remote Sensing Applications Centre.) International Meiteis Forum approached the Manipur High Court to prohibit the burial on the grounds that the site belonged to the Sericulture directorate of the state, and the high court issued an order to the effect. Eventually, an alternative site was offered for the burial.

According to a report in The Wire, negotiations between the Kuki militant groups under the suspension of operations ("SoO groups") and the Union government had culminated in an agreement to grant an autonomous territorial council for the Kuki-Zo people under the Sixth Schedule to the Constitution of India. The agreement was due to be signed on 8 May, but the chief minister Biren Singh is said to have been opposed to it. The scale of violence that was unleashed on 3 May led the Kuki-Zo people to change their mind, and the demand turned into a "separate administration" (separate from the state of Manipur). The Wire reported that ITLF was spearheading the demand, and, in August, proposed a map of the region it envisaged under "separate administration" (which had crystallised under the banner of a "Kuki state"). Officials from the home ministry said that the ITLF demands had to be taken into account as it seemed to be representing Kuki public sentiments.

In June 2024, the ITLF demanded a union territory with legislature for the Kuki-Zo community. It said that it was no longer possible for the tribal population to live in dignity under a "Meitei government".

== See also ==
- Kuki Inpi Manipur
- Federation of Haomee
- International Meeteis Forum
