= Sameirang =

Meetei ruler

- Monarchy: 517 AD-567 AD (1915 MF-1965 MF)
- Coronation: 517 AD (1915 MF)
- Predecessor: Naophangba
- Successor: Ura Konthouba
Names
- Meitingu Saameilang
Era name and dates
- Ancient Manipur: 517 AD-567 AD (1915 MF-1965 MF)
- Royalty: Ningthouja dynasty
- Father: Naophangba
- Mother: Queen Kaireima of Khuman dynasty
- Religion: Meiteism of Sanamahism
- Occupation: Ruler of Ancient Manipur (Antique Kangleipak)

Meidingu Sameirang (Old Manipuri: Meitingu Sameilang) was a Meetei ruler of Ningthouja dynasty of Ancient Manipur (Antique Kangleipak). He is the successor of Naophangba and the predecessor of Ura Konthouba. He was born to King Naophangba of Ningthouja dynasty and Queen Kaireima, the princess of Khuman dynasty. In 518 AD, he defeated Kwakpa Thawanthaba, the chief of the Angom principality and took possession of his territory after killing him.

He founded the "Phaida Loishang" (eunuch institution) led by a head for the first time in the kingdom. During his reign, Yumnaks (Meitei families) like Yengkhom, Keithellakpam and Kheirom are found mentioning in the chronicles. These are the descendants of Thamanglang, the step brother of King Sameirang. His name is mentioned in the inscription found in Khoibu region.

== Other websites ==
- Manipur, Past and Present: Nagas & Kuki-Chins
- Ethnic Relations Among the People of North-East India
- Archaeology in Manipur
- The History of Manipur: An early period
