= Chingjen Naran Panganba =

Chingjen Naran Panganba (ꯆꯤꯡꯖꯦꯟ ꯅꯥꯔꯟ ꯄꯥꯡꯒꯟꯕ), also known as Chingjel Naral Panganba (ꯆꯤꯡꯖꯦꯜ ꯅꯥꯔꯜ ꯄꯥꯡꯒꯟꯕ), is a prince of the Chenglei dynasty in ancient Kangleipak (early Manipur). He is notably mentioned in the classical Meitei literary work known as the Chengleiron, one of the earliest narratives of ancient Meitei literature. His stories are mythologized in Meitei mythology and folklore. He is deified and worshipped in traditional Meitei religion of Sanamahism. He is portrayed as a man of supernatural strength and extraordinary abilities, born to the Chenglei royal family. Over time, his name has come to symbolize exceptional physical power and courage in Meitei civilisation.

== Birth ==
Chingjen Naran Panganba was born to King Thangyi Khongjromba of the Chenglei dynasty and Penu Leimaren, daughter of the deity Soraren. His birth took place while his father was away at the frontier of the kingdom, leading the construction of defensive earthen ramparts. The legend says that shortly after birth, still with the umbilical cord attached, the infant left his mother and set out to find his father.

== Adventures ==
Upon locating his king-father, Chingjen Naran Panganba offered his services. In an unnatural display of strength, he managed to carry massive loads of earth (remblai) in only five steps, enough to form a hillock. In another event, he pulled down a large tree growing by a stream and used it as a seat for bathing. Other people climbed onto the tree, but when the child dismounted, the tree sprang back upright, throwing them off and killing them. This tree became known as misi, meaning “killer tree.”

These superhuman tasks surprised the king, who tried to request his son to stay. However, Chingjen Naran Panganba refused and journeyed westward over the mountains in search of further adventures.

== See also ==
- Yaoreima
- Toibi Leima
