= Khoibu stone inscriptions =

Stone epigraphs discovered in Manipur, India

The Stone Inscriptions of Khoibu (or Khoibu Pal stone inscriptions) refer to three ancient Meitei language stone epigraphs discovered in Khoibu village, located near the Indo-Myanmar border in Manipur, India. These inscriptions are significant archaeological and historical evidence indicating that the ancient Kangleipak (ancient Meitei kingdom) extended beyond the Imphal Valley and had administrative presence in the frontier hill regions.

== Location and historical context ==
Khoibu is a small village situated along the historic hill route that connected Imphal with Burma (present-day Myanmar), close to the Kabaw Valley, an area of strategic importance to the Manipur kingdom.

The three stone inscriptions span several centuries and are attributed to the reigns of different Meitei kings, ranging from the 5th to the 17th century. The inscriptions were discovered in the village surroundings and are written in various forms of archaic Meitei Mayek script.

=== First inscription: Reign of King Sameirang (5th century CE) ===
The first inscription is attributed to King Sameirang and his brother Thamanglang, dating to the 5th century CE. According to historian Prof. Gangmumei Kabui, the inscription was written in early Meitei script and records that Khoibu, as a border village, was protected by the two brothers. This inscription is one of the earliest references to the presence of Meitei administration in the Indo-Myanmar border area.

=== Second inscription: Reign of King Kiyamba (15th century CE) ===
The second inscription was issued during the reign of King Kiyamba (1467–1508). The stone, written in archaic Meitei script, measures approximately 2 feet 9 inches in width, 3 inches in thickness, and 3 feet 2 inches in height. A translated portion of the inscription states that Khoibu was to be exempted from tributes, and that its inhabitants were not to be tortured. This suggests a special administrative or religious status granted to the village.

=== Third inscription: Reign of King Paikhomba (17th century CE) ===
The third inscription is attributed to King Paikhomba, who ruled in the 17th century. Of the sixteen deciphered lines, the text declares that King Paikhomba erected the stone and reaffirms that Khoibu village is the worshipper of a tutelary deity, as decreed earlier by King Kiyamba. The inscription also confirms that Khoibu was exempted from state duties, physical punishment, and Lallup service (a form of mandatory labor or military duty practiced in the Meitei kingdom).

== Cultural and historical significance ==
The Khoibu inscriptions are considered among the most important archaeological records for understanding the territorial extent and administrative practices of the ancient Manipur kingdom. They show that border villages like Khoibu held special legal and religious status, and they help trace the early use of Meitei script in frontier regions. These findings support the view that the ancient Meitei polity was more extensive and organized than previously assumed, with defined border policies and recognition of hill communities as part of the kingdom's structure.

== See also ==
- Ancient Meitei literature
- Ancient Meitei religion
- Ancient Meitei script
- Tarao Pal stone inscriptions
