= Thangyi Taobung Khongdouba =

Thangyi Taobung Khongdouba was a king of the Chenglei dynasty in ancient Kangleipak (early Manipur). He is a notable figure in early Manipuri literature and Meitei folklore, especially as featured in the classical Meitei historical-mythological text, Chengleiron. His story shows royal customs, family dynamics, and emotional drama during the early period of Manipur's literary and cultural development.

== Family ==
Thangyi Taobung Khongdouba was the son of King Thangyi Khongjromba of the Chenglei dynasty and his second wife. His half-brother, through Khongjromba's first wife, was Naophangba (Meitei blood of the Ningthouja dynasty), who later became a king of the Meitei dynasty. Khongdouba's story is mentioned in the later part of the Chengleiron, which is a combination of the elements of both legend and early historical events across generations of Chenglei rulers.

== Marriage ==
Khongdouba married Toibi Leima, a princess from the Luwang dynasty, one of the prominent noble families of ancient Manipur. Their union was politically significant, strengthening ties between the Chenglei and Luwang royalties. Together, they had two sons. However, the marriage took a troubled turn. Toibi Leima fell seriously ill with a disfiguring disease. Instead of caring for her, Khongdouba neglected her, and she returned to her parental home for treatment. There, she gradually recovered and regained her former beauty.

== Reunion ==
Sometime later, Khongdouba encountered Toibi Leima again during a hunting expedition. Struck by her renewed beauty, he forcibly took her back home. He did so using trickery and the help of a cunning servant.

== See also ==
- List of Khuman queens
- List of Khuman kings
- Khuman Kangleirol
- Moirang Kangleirol
- Ningthourol Lambuba
- Cheitharol Kumbaba
