= Naothingkhong =

- Monarchy: 662 AD-762 AD (2060 MF-2160 MF)
- Coronation: 662 AD (2060 MF)
- Predecessor: Ura Konthouba
- Successor: Khongtekcha
- Born: Hongnemyoi Khunjao
- Spouse: Pitang-nga, Ewanglon Namun Chaobee
Names
- Meitingu Naothingkhong
Era name and dates
- Ancient Manipur: 662 AD-762 AD (2060 MF-2160 MF)
- Royalty: Ningthouja dynasty
- Father: Ura Konthouba
- Mother: Leima Nungjengshu
- Religion: Meiteism of Sanamahism
- Occupation: Ruler of Ancient Manipur (Antique Kangleipak)

Meidingu Hongnemyoi Khunjao Naothingkhong (Old Manipuri: Meitingu Hongnemyoi Khunchao Naothingkhong) was a Meetei ruler of Ningthouja dynasty of Ancient Manipur (Antique Kangleipak). He was the successor of Ura Konthouba and the predecessor of Khongtekcha.

He ran away from the Kangla at the age of about 10 or 12 years and went to live along the Shelloi Langmais in the Nongmaiching Hill in the eastern Manipur. He was madly in love with Pitang-nga, a Langmai girl and married her. They lived in her parents' house. This is the first reference to the matrilocal residence in the history of Manipuri ethnicity. According to ancient sources, he has six wives from different clan principalities of Ancient Manipur (Antique Kangleipak). In fact, he has nine total wives, out of which three are childless. So, in general cases, it is regarded as he has six wives. He married Princess Ewanglon Namun Chaobee after engagement. Luwang Ningthou Punshiba of Luwang dynasty gave training of state craft and the art of governance to Naothingkhong when he was a prince. Besides, the great-grandson of Luwang Ningthou Punshiba (from his first wife) married Naothingkhong's daughter.

The Naothingkhong Phambal Kaba (English: Naothingkhong's accession to the throne), a literary work, narrates his life story of how he ascended the throne. He defeated Mangang Konkhuchaa Atengba, the chief of Mangang tribe, after which the Mangangs merged into the Ningthoujas. He is one of the nine kings associated with the design of a historic flag. The Meitei family Lourembam of the Ningthouja dynasty branch appeared during the reign of Naothingkhong.

== Connection with Pong ==
A shan named Samlung, the younger brother of Sukanpha, the king of Pong, visited the Kangleipak and stayed at Aapong Ingkhol which is on the eastern side of Kangla for 10 years.

== See also ==
- matrilocality
