= Tarao Pal stone inscriptions =

The stone inscriptions of Tarao Pal are a group of four historical Meitei language inscriptions discovered in the remote area of Tarao Pal, near the Indo-Myanmar border in what was formerly Chandel district, Manipur, India. These inscriptions were found beginning in 1974 and date from different periods in the history of the ancient Kangleipak (Meitei kingdom), ranging from the 6th century to the 19th century CE.

== Discovery and location ==
The inscriptions were found in isolated locations near Tarao Pal, close to the international border with Myanmar. The site is located in the eastern frontier of the former kingdom of Manipur, an area that historically served as a strategic boundary zone. The discovery was significant for understanding the administrative and military presence of the Meitei rulers in the region.

== Historical context ==
The oldest inscription is attributed to King Ura Konthouba (reigned c. 6th century), while the latest inscription belongs to the reign of King Gambhir Singh (early 19th century). One of the inscriptions is dated to the reign of King Kiyamba (1467–1508), a ruler known for military campaigns and territorial expansion.

During Kiyamba’s reign, the Kabaw Valley was annexed following a joint military expedition with King Khekhomba of the Shan kingdom (referred to as Pong by the Meiteis). This campaign led to the establishment of the Chindwin River (Ningthi Turel) as the eastern boundary of Manipur.

== Content and features ==
The inscriptions are written in early forms of the Meitei Mayek script. They contain royal orders, religious statements, and administrative decrees. Due to weathering and age, some parts of the inscriptions are now illegible.

Key Inscriptions

- Kiyamba Inscription (24.5 x 13 cm): This inscription declares that animal theft and slave-taking from the village of Tarao Pal would not be tolerated. It identifies the village as the eastern guard post of the kingdom. A nearby temple is mentioned in one deciphered line. Only four lines are partially legible.
- Second Kiyamba Inscription (15 x 14 cm): Contains five lines, stating that it was the divine order of King Kiyamba that slaves must not be taken from Tarao Pal.
- Gambhir Singh Inscription (22 x 20 cm): This later inscription has seven lines, also written in archaic Meitei script. Some parts are damaged and remain undeciphered.

== Cultural and historical significance ==
The Tarao Pal inscriptions provide evidences of the administrative control and frontier policies of the Meitei kings, the use of early Meitei script, religious practices, and legal norms concerning slavery and community protection, the construction of temples and the enforcement of royal authority in the Meitei civilisation.

== See also ==
- Ancient Meitei literature
- Ancient Meitei religion
- Ancient Meitei script
- Khoibu stone inscriptions
