= Machu =

Machu may refer to:

- Machu (Meitei culture), aspects of different colours in Meitei civilization
- Machu Picchu, an old civilization site in the Americas
