= Coalition of Indigenes' Rights Campaign, Manipur =

Activist organisation in Manipur, India

- Founded: 2015
- Type: Meitei activist organisation
- Purpose: Campaigning for pre-merger status of Manipur
- Region served: Imphal Valley, Manipur, India
- President: Somorendro Thokchom
- Vice-President: Longjam Ratan
- Spokesperson: Ningthouja Lancha

Coalition of Indigenes' Rights Campaign, Manipur (Note: The name is more often written as Coalition of Indigenous Rights Campaign in newspapers.) (CIRCA) is a Meitei activist organisation in the state of Manipur, India. It campaigns against the merger agreement by which the princely state of Manipur merged into independent India in 1949, and demands a pre-merger status for Manipur. The organisation collaborated at its inception with Manipur's titular king, Leishemba Sanajaoba, but broke off the engagement after he was elected to the Indian Parliament. The organisation is headed by Somorendro Thokchom, who is also the coordinator of the umbrella organisation COCOMI in 2024.

== Background ==
In 1949, two years after India's independence, the ruler of the princely state of Manipur, Maharaja Bodhchandra Singh, was persuaded to sign a merger agreement with the Indian Union, which was soon to become a Republic in January 1950. All the princely states of India inherited from British Raj signed similar merger agreements, except for a handful of very large states that were accepted as independent India's states. In Manipur, resentment against the action of India took hold by the 1960s, coupled with a demand for full statehood for Manipur, which was still a union territory at that time. Secessionist sentiments began to grow. Despite the grant of full statehood in 1972, a major section of Manipuris still believed that all the privileges Manipur had before its merger ("pre-merger status") should be restored to it.

At the time of the merger, Maharaja Bodhchandra Singh was granted a privy purse of Rs. 300,000 per annum and the continued use of the title "Maharaja". His son Okendrajit inherited both of them, but they were abolished in course of time. His successor, Leishemba Sanajaoba, when "crowned" in 1996, had no power or influence or even a steady income stream, even though he continued to use the title "Maharaja" without statutory sanction.

== Organisation and activities ==
CIRCA was set up in 2015 as a "coalition", by unnamed "like-minded organisations" which wanted Manipur to return to its pre-merger political status. Somorendro Thokchom was named as its convener, and later, its president.

The first activity of CIRCA was to start a month-long protest against Manipur's merger, starting on 21 September 2015, the anniversary of the signing of the merger agreement. Leishemba Sanajaoba kicked off the campaign from his Sana Konung palace, by hoisting the "state flag" at half-mast. The speakers claimed that all the problems besetting Manipur were an outgrowth of the merger agreement. Sanajaoba said that the political relationship between Manipur and India had to be renegotiated.

Since then, 21 September has been observed every year as the "National Repentance Day". 14 August is also celebrated as the "Manipur Independence Day". In 2018, CIRCA published a book titled Why Pre-Merger Political Status for Manipur, setting out its ideology.

In 2020, Leishemba Sanajaoba decided to contest the Manipur's seat in Rajya Sabha, the Upper House of the Indian Parliament. CIRCA believed that this was inconsistent with his role as the titular Maharaja, and broke off its collaboration with him. Afterwards, all its observances were carried out without Sanajaoba. Sanajaoba floated a new organisation called Arambai Tenggol, which became a major force during the Manipur conflict that started in 2023.

During the Manipur conflict, CIRCA maintained a low profile, but celebrated the "Manipur Independence Day" and "National Repentance Day", claiming that all the "chronic issues" of Manipur can be resolved if the political autonomy of the state is restored.

== Links with other organisations ==
The underground organisation National Revolutionary Front, Manipur (NRFM) has called general strikes on 21 September, which coincide with CIRCA's observances of "National Repentance Day".

Several other organisations have participated in CIRCA's observances, such as WASEDEV (Women's Association for Socio-Economic Development), AMWJU (All Manipur Working Journalists’ Union), HERICOUN (Ethno-Heritage Council), LKKL (Leihou Khunai Kanba Luptin), IKAL (Iramdam Kanba Apunba Lup).

CIRCA president Somorendro Thokchom is also the president of LIPUL (League of Indigenous People's Upliftment), which is a member unit of the Coordinating Committee on Manipur Integrity (COCOMI). Thokchom serves as the coordinator of COCOMI during 2023–2024.

CIRCA vice-president Longjam Ratan is also the president of HERICOUN.
