= Toibi Leima =

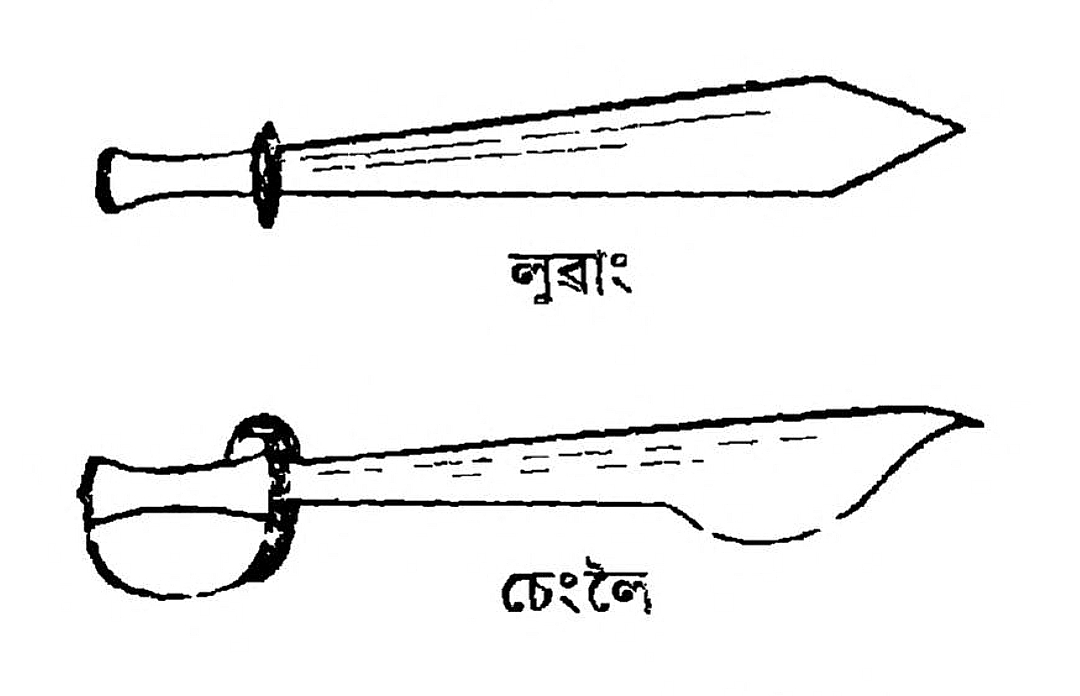
Holy & sacred swords of the Luwang & Chenglei Yek Salai groups (clans/dynasties) of Meitei confederacy of ancient Kangleipak

Toibi Leima (Note: written in traditional Meitei Mayek script as ꯇꯣꯏꯕꯤ ꯂꯩꯃ.) was a princess of the Luwang dynasty in ancient Kangleipak (early Manipur). She was the wife of King Thangyi Taobung Khongdouba of the Chenglei dynasty. She is mentioned in the Chengleiron, a classical text of ancient Meitei literature (early Manipuri literature).

== Family ==
Toibi Leima was born into the Luwang royal family, which was one of the ruling families of the ancient principalities of Manipur. She later married Thangyi Taobung Khongdouba of the Chenglei dynasty. She had two sons.

== Illness and neglect ==
After the birth of her children, Toibi Leima became ill. The illness changed her appearance. Her husband started losing his interest in her. He did not care for her and eventually neglected her. She then returned to her parental home. She got her medical treatment and recovery.

== Recovery and reunion ==
Toibi Leima recovered from her illness and regained her youthful appearance. During a hunting trip, her husband Khongdouba saw her again by chance and immediately got attracted to her. He then decided to take her back with the help of a clever servant's plot. He brought her back to his home by force.

== See also ==
- Meitei confederacy
- Women in Meitei civilisation
- Yaoreima
- Haoreima
- List of Meitei princesses
- List of Khuman queens
- Meitei queens of Tripura
- Meitei goddesses
