= Naokhamba =

Ruler of Ancient Manipur

- Monarchy: 410 AD-427 AD (1825 MF-1915 MF)
- Coronation: 410 AD (1825 MF)
- Predecessor: Kaokhangba
- Successor: Naophangba
Names
- Meitingu Naokhampa
Era name and dates
- Ancient Manipur: 410 AD-427 AD (1825 MF-1915 MF)
- Religion: Meiteism of Sanamahism
- Occupation: Ruler of Ancient Manipur (Antique Kangleipak)

Meidingu Naokhamba (Old Manipuri: Meitingu Naokhampa) was a Meitei king of the Ningthouja dynasty of Ancient Manipur (Antique Kangleipak). He is the successor of Kaokhangba and the predecessor of Naophangba. During his reign, Manipuri traders reached out on horseback to upper Burma and China. During his reign, Chingjen Naran Panggalba, the king of the Chengleis left Kangleipak for westward lands.

Besides the Cheitharol Kumbaba and the Ningthourol Lambuba, he is also mentioned in the Chengleiron. Naokhamba abducted the wife of King Thangyi Khongjromba of the Chenglei tribe when she was heavily pregnant. Later, she had a son named "Naophang Ahanba". The same wife also later gave birth to another son and a daughter called Naophangba and Yoirum Chengbi respectively.

When Naokhamba died, Naophang Ahanba claimed he was the eldest son and deserved to inherit the throne. However, the people knew he was actually the son of Thangyi Khongjromba. This led to a dispute over who should take the throne. In the end, their mother stepped in and suggested that her two sons seek God's judgment by dipping themselves in water. The one who could stay submerged the longest would be considered the rightful successor. They accepted this challenge, and ultimately, Naophangba won and took his father's place.

== Other books ==
- Siṃha, Oināma Bhogeśwara (1967). Niṃthaurola śaireṃ.
- Tensuba, Keerti Chand (1993). Genesis of Indian Tribes: An Approach to the History of Meiteis and Thais. ISBN 9788121003087.
- Tombi Singh, N. (1975). Manipur and the Mainstream.
