= Yaoreima =

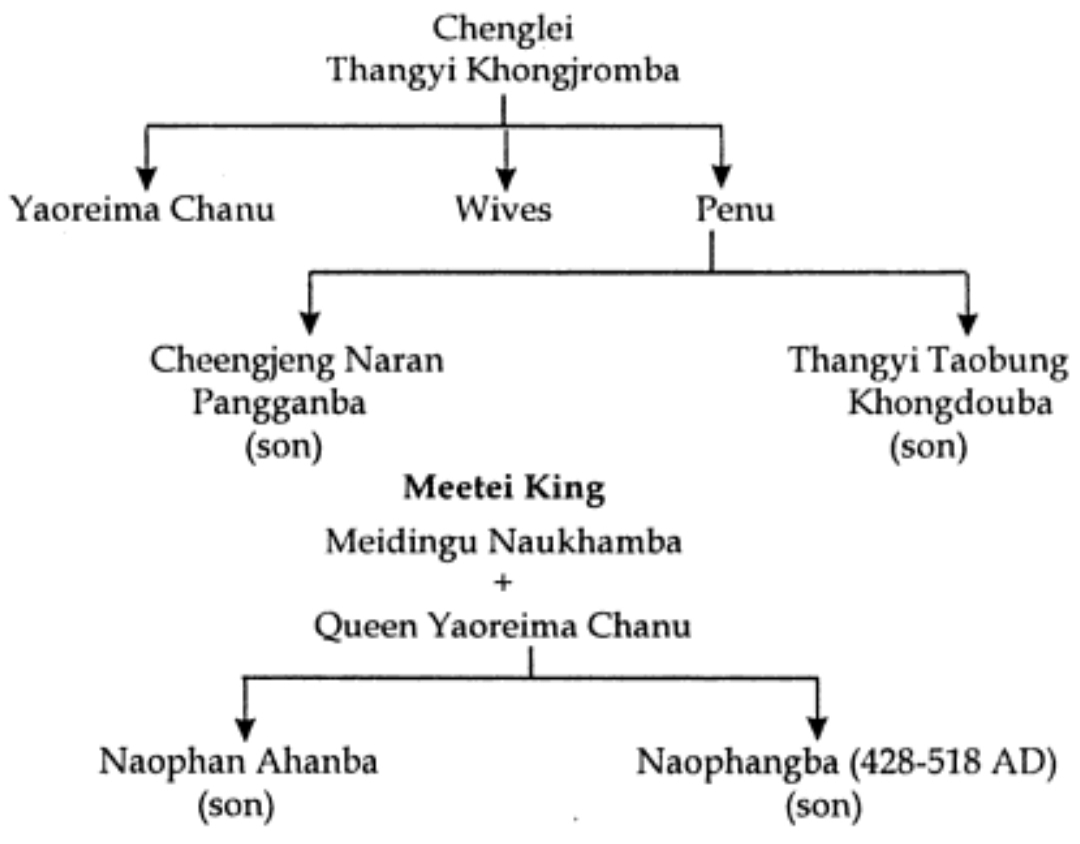
Yaoreima Chanu, the queen of both ruling houses of the Chenglei dynasty (Sarang Leishangthem group) & the Ningthouja dynasty (Mangang or dominant Meitei group)

Yaoreima, also known as Yaoreima Chanu, was a queen in the early history of ancient Meitei civilization. She was connected to both the Chenglei kingdom and the Ningthouja kingdom.

== Early life ==
Yaoreima was the wife of Thangyi Khongjromba, a king of the Chenglei dynasty. Through this marriage, she became queen of the Chenglei kingdom.

She is mentioned in the Chengleiron, the royal chronicle of the Chenglei dynasty. This record connects her to the history and traditions of the Chenglei rulers.

== Conflict between the Chenglei and Ningthouja kings ==
Later, Yaoreima became related to with Naokhamba, a Meitei king of the Ningthouja dynasty. According to different accounts, she either eloped with Naokhamba or was abducted by him. This event caused a conflict between the two kings.

A duel fight happened between the Chenglei king and the Ningthouja king. Naokhamba defeated Thangyi Khongjromba. After this defeat, Yaoreima became the queen of the Ningthouja kingdom.

== Queen of the Ningthoujas ==
As queen of the Ningthouja kingdom, Yaoreima gave birth to two princes. One was Naophan Ahanba. The other was Naophangba, who lived from about 428 to 518 CE and later became king of the Ningthouja dynasty.

Yaoreima is mentioned in several Ningthouja chronicles. These include the Chada Laihui, which records the birth givers or queen mothers of the Ningthouja kings, the Cheitharol Kumbaba, the royal chronicle of the Ningthouja kings, and the Ningthourol Lambuba, another chronicle of the Ningthouja rulers.

== See also ==
- List of Meitei princesses
- List of Khuman queens
- Meitei queens of Tripura
- Meitei goddesses
