= Ura Konthouba =

Meetei ruler

- The Meetei script letter for "W" (Wai) representing Emperor "Wura Konthouba".
- Monarchy: 567 AD-657 AD (1965 MF-2055 MF)
- Coronation: 567 AD (1965 MF)
- Predecessor: Sameirang
- Successor: Naothingkhong
- Spouse: Leima Nungjengshu
- Issue: Naothingkhong
Names
- Meitingu Ula Konthoupa
Era name and dates
- Ancient Manipur: 567 AD-657 AD (1965 MF-2055 MF)
- Royalty: Ningthouja dynasty
- Religion: Meiteism of Sanamahism
- Occupation: Ruler of Ancient Manipur (Antique Kangleipak)

Meidingu Ura Konthouba (Old Manipuri: Meitingu Ula Konthoupa) or Wura Konthouba (Old Manipuri: Wula Konthoupa) was a Meetei ruler of Ningthouja dynasty of Ancient Manipur (Antique Kangleipak). He is the successor of Sameirang and the predecessor of Naothingkhong.

In 568 AD, he issued coins for the first time in the kingdom. During his reign, the Selloi Langmai tribes attacked the Haokap hills by trespassing into Meitei territory. The Naothingkhong Phambal Kaba describes that he uprooted the Selloi-Langmai people. His daughter was married to the King of Moirang whose descendants took the surname "Ura".

== See also ==
- Yumbanlol copper plate inscriptions
