= Machu (Meitei culture) =

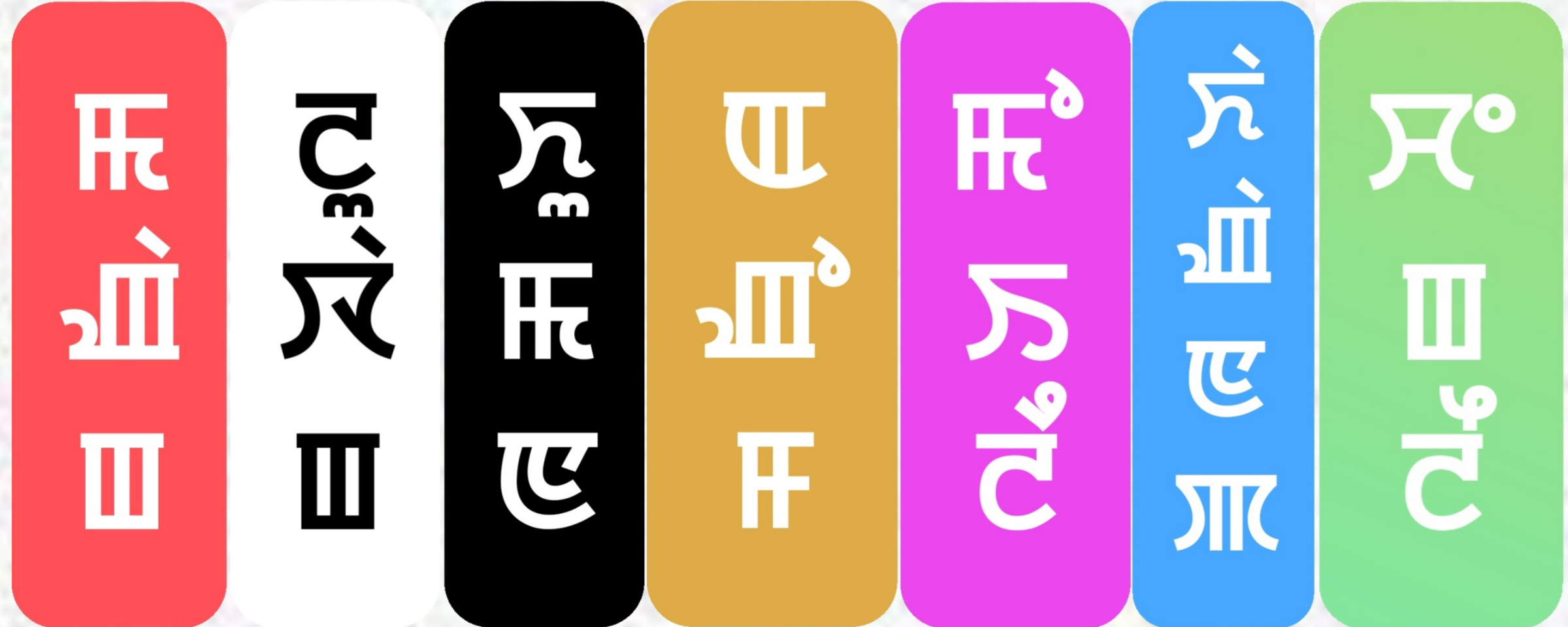
Classical Meitei language names of the 7 Yek Salai groups of Meitei confederacy of ancient Kangleipak (early Manipur) in their respective 7 holy and sacred colors

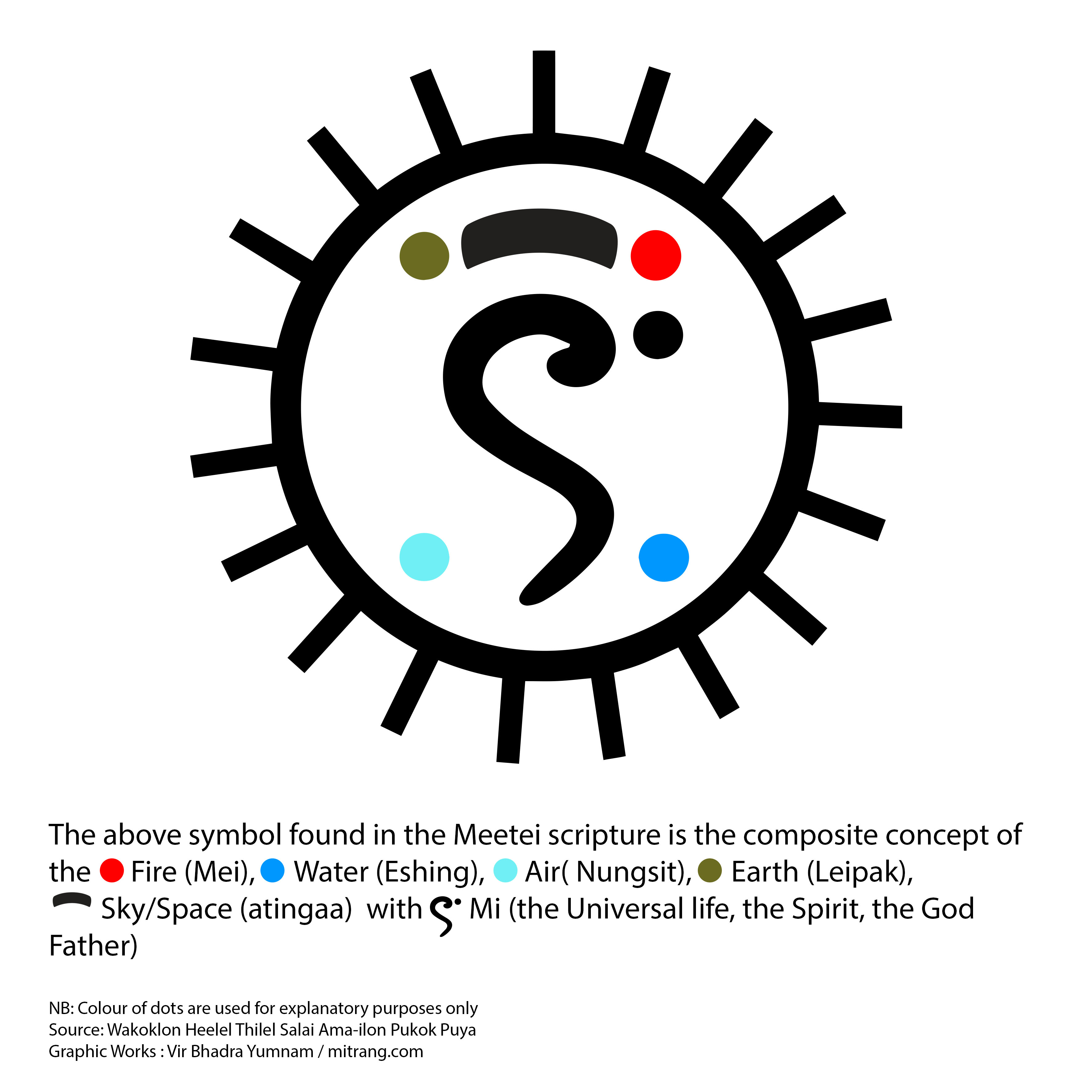
The holy and sacred symbol for Sanamahism (traditional Meitei religion) is the composite concept of the classical elements, in distinct colours, namely Fire (Mei), Water (Eshing), Air (Nungsit), Earth (Leipak), Sky/Space (atingaa) with (꯱) Mi (the Universal life, the Spirit, the God Father)

In Meitei language and culture, Machu (/matʃu/; /mə.cu/) refers to the concept of color and encompasses both its visual and cultural dimensions. Beyond serving as a means of identifying and describing objects, colors in the Meitei civilization carry symbolic meanings that are reflected in language, clothing, rituals, art, and social practices. Different colors are associated with particular emotions, values, natural elements, and ceremonial contexts, contributing to the expression of cultural identity and worldview.

== Sacred colours ==
| Sacred colours (Note: Variations exist based on different contexts as per different sources) | Associated Yek Salai groups of the Meitei confederacy | Romanisation | Note(s) |
|---|---|---|---|
| Red | ꯅꯤꯡꯊꯧꯖꯥ (ꯃꯉꯥꯡ) | Ningthouja (Mangang) | |
| Light blue/White | ꯂꯨꯋꯥꯡ | Luwang | |
| Black | ꯈꯨꯃꯟ | Khuman | |
| White/Yellow | ꯑꯉꯣꯝ | Angom | |
| Yellow/Dark Red | ꯃꯣꯢꯔꯥꯡ ꯁꯂꯥꯢ (ꯃꯣꯢꯂꯥꯡ) | Moirang (Moilang) | |
| Green (striped)/Sweet potato colour | ꯈꯥ ꯉꯥꯟꯄ | Kha Nganpa | |
| Green/Sky colour | ꯁꯂꯥꯡ ꯂꯩꯁꯥꯡꯊꯦꯝ (ꯁꯂꯥꯏ ꯂꯩꯁꯥꯡꯊꯦꯝ) | Sarang Leishangthem (Salang / Salai Leishangthem) | |

Salai Taret flag, showing seven holy and sacred colours of the seven Yek Salais of Meitei civilisation

== Colour terms ==
=== Basic colour terms ===
Applying the criteria proposed by Berlin and Kay for identifying basic colour terms, Meiteilon (Manipuri) can be described as having four basic colour terms: əmubə ('black'), əŋəubə ('white'), əŋaŋbə ('red'), and əsəŋbə ('green'). These terms satisfy the principal criteria for basic colour terminology in that they are monolexemic, their meanings are not subsumed under other colour terms, their application is not restricted to specific categories of objects, and they are regarded as psychologically salient by native speakers.

Although Meiteilon possesses lexical items corresponding to the remaining colours commonly recognised in cross-linguistic studies, these expressions are generally considered derived rather than basic. Their formation is closely associated with objects or phenomena in the natural and cultural environment, and many of them require the element məcu ('colour') to explicitly denote a colour category.

=== Derived colour terms ===
The Meiteilon term for yellow is həŋamməpalməcu, which is composed of həŋam ('mustard'), məpal ('flower'), and məcu ('colour'). The expression derives its meaning from the characteristic yellow colour of mustard flowers. Similarly, the term for blue is higokməcu, in which məcu functions as the colour marker. The lexical item higok itself does not possess an independently transparent meaning, and its etymology has been the subject of different interpretations.

The term for brown is unsaməcu, derived from unsa ('skin') together with məcu ('colour'), thereby referring to the colour associated with human skin. Purple is traditionally expressed as məikhetməcu, where məikhet denotes a matchbox. This expression is believed to have originated from the distinctive purple colour of a commonly used matchbox in earlier periods. In contemporary usage, however, many speakers employ expressions such as purple məcu, directly influenced by English, or khamenməcu, derived from khamen ('brinjal' or 'eggplant').

The colour pink is expressed as ləiməcu, in which ləi means 'flower', reflecting the association of the colour with flowers. Orange is denoted by komlaməcu, derived from komla ('orange'), while grey is expressed as utməcu, where ut means 'ash'. These forms illustrate the productive strategy of deriving colour terminology from salient objects in the physical environment, with the obligatory addition of məcu to indicate that the reference is specifically to colour.

=== Emphatic forms of basic colour terms ===
Meiteilon employs a set of emphatic roots to intensify the meaning of basic colour terms. These emphatic markers include -suk, -saŋ, -sok/-rok, and -trik. Each basic colour term combines with a specific emphatic marker, and these combinations are lexically fixed rather than interchangeable.

The colour term əmubə ('black') combines with the marker -suk to form musukmubə, meaning 'intensely' or 'really black'. Likewise, əŋəubə ('white') combines with -sok or -rok to produce ŋəusokŋəubə or ŋəurokŋəubə, meaning 'really white'. The colour term əŋaŋbə ('red') combines with -saŋ to form ŋaŋsaŋŋaŋbə, while əsəŋbə ('green') combines with -trik to produce səŋtriksəŋbə, both expressing heightened intensity of the respective colours.

The distribution of these emphatic markers is fixed within the language. Consequently, forms created by substituting one marker for another, such as musokmubə or musəŋsəŋbə, are not considered acceptable in Meiteilon.

=== Reduplication and quantification ===
Another strategy for expressing emphasis involves the quantifier pum-nə ('all') together with reduplication of the colour root. This construction conveys that an object or entity is entirely characterised by a particular colour.

Examples include pum-mu-mu-i ('it is completely black'), puŋ-ŋəu-ŋəu-i ('it is completely white'), puŋ-ŋaŋ-ŋaŋ-i ('it is completely red'), and pum-saŋ-saŋ-i ('it is completely green'). In the forms involving ŋəu ('white') and ŋaŋ ('red'), the bilabial nasal in pum undergoes assimilation to the velar nasal, resulting in the form puŋ.

=== Formation of approximate colour expressions ===
Meiteilon also possesses morphological markers that express approximation or the equivalent of the English suffix '-ish'. These markers include -dəŋ, -ru, -tək, and -ban, each of which is associated with a specific basic colour term.

The colour term əmubə ('black') combines with -dəŋ to produce mudəŋnəbə ('blackish'). Similarly, əŋəubə ('white') takes the marker -ru to form ŋaurunəbə ('whitish'), əŋaŋbə ('red') combines with -tək to produce ŋaŋtəknəbə ('reddish'), and əsəŋbə ('green') combines with -ban to form səŋbannəbə ('greenish').

As with emphatic constructions, these suffixes are lexically restricted. The markers cannot be freely substituted across colour terms, and alternative combinations that violate these fixed associations are not regarded as acceptable forms in Meiteilon.

=== Characteristics of non-basic colour terms ===
Non-basic colour terms in Meiteilon, including expressions such as həŋamməpalməcu ('yellow'), ləiməcu ('pink'), komlaməcu ('orange'), and unsaməcu ('brown'), obligatorily include the lexical element məcu ('colour'). The presence of this element distinguishes colour expressions from references to the source objects themselves. These terms demonstrate that a significant portion of the Meiteilon colour lexicon is formed through semantic extension from culturally or environmentally salient entities rather than through independent basic lexical items.

=== Etymology of higokməcu ('Blue') ===
The origin of the Meiteilon term higokməcu ('blue') has been interpreted in different ways. One explanation analyses higok as consisting of the elements hi and gok, with gok being associated with fading (kokpa). According to this interpretation, the term refers to a colour that emerges as another colour fades, resulting in a bluish appearance.

An alternative explanation associates the term with the Kombirei flower, whose blossoms reportedly change from blue to white as they wither. Within this interpretation, hi has been connected with notions of divinity, while higok is understood as referring metaphorically to the fading or withering of divine qualities. These explanations remain etymological interpretations rather than universally established accounts of the term's origin.

== Colour intensity expression ==
In addition to lexical colour terms, Meiteilon possesses a set of descriptive expressions that denote variations in colour intensity and quality. These include ǝmǝmbǝ ('dark'), ǝŋanbǝ ('light' or 'bright'), ǝwaobǝ ('faded' or 'lighter shade'), ǝyakpǝ ('deep shade' or 'fast colour'), and ǝmeŋbǝ ('gentle' or 'soft'). These descriptive verbs occur in both emphatic and attenuated forms, enabling speakers to indicate different degrees of colour intensity.

The emphatic forms are created through reduplication of the lexical root combined with the intensifying morpheme -trik-. Thus, ǝmǝmbǝ becomes mǝm-trik-mǝm-bǝ, meaning 'really dark'; ǝŋanbǝ becomes ŋan-trik-ŋan-bǝ, meaning 'really bright'; ǝwaobǝ becomes wao-trik-wao-bǝ, meaning 'really faded'; ǝyakpǝ forms yak-trik-yak-bǝ, expressing 'really deep' or 'fast colour'; and ǝmeŋbǝ becomes meŋ-trik-meŋ-bǝ, meaning 'really gentle'.

An alternative strategy for expressing emphasis involves the quantifier pum-nǝ. When combined with these descriptive verbs, the lexical root undergoes reduplication, producing expressions such as pum-mǝm-mǝm-i ('it is very dark'), puŋ-ŋan-ŋan-i ('it is very bright'), puŋ-wao-wao-i ('it is very faded'), puŋ-yak-yak-i ('it is very deep' or 'fast-coloured'), and puŋ-meŋ-meŋ-i ('it is very gentle in colour'). The present tense marker -i has an allomorphic variant -li, which occurs after verb stems ending in certain consonants, including /t/ and /l/.

Reduced or attenuated intensity is expressed through the modifier -tǝk-. This produces forms such as mǝm-tǝk-pǝ ('slightly dark'), ŋan-tǝk-pǝ ('slightly bright'), wao-tǝk-pǝ ('slightly faded'), yak-tǝk-pǝ ('slightly deep' or 'fast-coloured'), and meŋ-tǝk-pǝ ('slightly gentle'). The morphemes -trik- and -tǝk- are specifically associated with indicating degrees of colour intensity and do not occur with the other colour-modifying roots discussed elsewhere.

== Colour change expression ==
Meiteilon distinguishes lexical expressions describing changes in colour, particularly with reference to skin tone. The noun kucu denotes skin colour, and several expressions describe alterations in complexion. The expression kucu mu-sǝn-bǝ denotes 'to become darker', while kucu ŋǝu-thok-bǝ means 'to become fairer'. Another expression, kucu taiphet-ta-bǝ, refers to 'becoming pale', specifically indicating a loss of colour resulting from blood draining from the body.

More general colour changes are expressed through the modifier jhǝn-bǝ, which conveys the meaning 'to become' or 'to undergo change'. Examples include ŋaŋ-jhǝn-bǝ ('to become red') and sǝŋ-jhǝn-bǝ ('to become green'). Ongoing changes are marked by the additional processive element -lǝk-, yielding forms such as ŋaŋ-jhǝn-lǝk-pǝ ('to be in the process of becoming red') and sǝŋ-jhǝn-lǝk-bǝ ('to be in the process of becoming green').

For non-basic colour terms, expressions of colour change require the combination of cǝŋ-bǝ ('to enter') with jhǝn-bǝ ('to become'). Thus, yellow is expressed as mǝcu cǝŋ-jhǝn-bǝ ('to become yellow'), whereas the form mǝcu-jhǝn-bǝ is not acceptable in Meiteilon. Similarly, pink mǝcu cǝŋ-jhǝn-bǝ denotes 'to become pink'. Progressive change is expressed through forms such as mǝcu cǝŋ-jhǝn-lǝk-pǝ, meaning 'to be in the process of becoming yellow'.

== Cultural significance ==
Several colour terms in Meiteilon are closely associated with cultural practices and traditional beliefs. The lexical item mǝcu, which functions as the non-basic colour term for yellow, also refers to turmeric, a spice widely used in cooking. The primary lexical term for turmeric is yaiŋǝŋ. However, according to a traditional belief observed in Meitei society, this term is avoided after sunset because its use is considered inauspicious. Consequently, speakers employ mǝcu instead. For example, after sunset the expression mǝcu lǝitre indicates that turmeric is unavailable, whereas during the day the equivalent expression is yaiŋǝŋ lǝitre. Similarly, requests for turmeric in local markets differ according to the time of day, with mǝcu packet amalǝuge used in the evening and yaiŋǝŋ packet amalǝuge during daylight hours. Although mǝcu serves as the colour term for yellow, the non-basic colour designation is not derived from the lexical item yaiŋǝŋ, reflecting the influence of this cultural taboo.

The lexical association between fire and the colour red is also culturally significant. The noun mǝi denotes 'fire', while the colour red is expressed by ǝŋaŋbǝ. An example such as mǝi do ŋaŋ-sǝŋ-ŋaŋ-nǝ cak hǝu-i describes fire burning intensely. In this expression, the modified superlative form ŋaŋ-sǝŋ-ŋaŋ-nǝ emphasises the brightness and intensity of the burning fire.

Certain expressions extend beyond conventional colour descriptions to evoke perceptual qualities. The term lǝicil ('fog'), together with ǝpaibǝ ('floating'), may be employed to describe colours that appear indistinct, constantly changing, or lacking a clearly defined hue. These expressions illustrate metaphorical extensions within the Meiteilon colour lexicon.

The descriptive term ǝmeŋbǝ ('soft' or 'gentle') is also used metaphorically across different semantic domains. In colour descriptions, ǝmeŋbǝ mǝcu denotes a soft or gentle colour, while ǝmeŋbǝ khonjel refers to a gentle or soothing voice. In both contexts, the expression conveys qualities associated with visual or auditory pleasantness rather than physical softness alone.

Traditional dyeing practices have also contributed distinctive colour terminology. An indigenous, non-toxic dye known as urǝirom is obtained from the pulp of the annatto tree and has traditionally been used to dye garments such as the khudǝi (traditional towel), phǝnek (women's lower garment), and phidup (upper garment). The expression urǝirom mǝcu refers to the characteristic light orange shade produced by this dye. Although this colour has no exact English equivalent, it is distinct from the general non-basic colour term for orange, komla mǝcu, which is used in ordinary contexts. The specialised use of urǝirom mǝcu reflects its association with traditional textiles employed in religious ceremonies and funerary practices. These garments are initially woven in white and subsequently dyed using urǝirom. Such dyed textiles are referred to as urǝirom mǝcu-nǝ-sǝŋ-bǝ phi, meaning 'cloth dyed with urǝirom colour'. In this expression, the verb sǝŋ denotes the act of colouring or dyeing rather than the lexical meaning 'green'.

== Khurkhul variations ==
=== Basic color terms ===
Khurkhul dialect of Meitei language has a vast vocabulary of different terms of basic colours.

Colour terms in Khurkhul
| Basic colour | Non-basic colour term | The thing | The colour |
|---|---|---|---|
| ANGOUBA (WHITE) | sangkom mapram machu | the upper the layer of boiled milk | slightly reddish white |
| ANGOUBA (WHITE) | wa pongshang mapram machu | the thin layer inside the bamboo | transparent white |
| ANGOUBA (WHITE) | chanton machu | sandalwood | very white |
| ANGOUBA (WHITE) | laphuleiyon machu | the tenderes banana leaf | slightly greenish white |
| AMUBA (BLACK) | lakang machu | dirt gathered near the cooking hearth | slightly reddish black |
| AMUBA (BLACK) | kangchet machu | European rhinoceros beetle | slightly more reddish than lakang machu |
| AMUBA (BLACK) | heikha appatpa machu | rotten plum | light blue |
| AMUBA (BLACK) | ut machu | ash | Grey |
| AMUBA (BLACK) | timunapun machu | blind snake | slightly reddish blackish |
| ANGANGBA (RED) | kurao mapan machu | red coral flower | deep red |
| ANGANGBA (RED) | salu angangba machu | salu | blackish deep red |
| ANGANGBA (RED) | soukri mapan machu | roselle flower | close to blackish deep red |
| ANGANGBA (RED) | kabirei machu | oleander flower | near pink |
| ANGANGBA (RED) | kaphoi mapan machu | pomegranate flower | close to near pink |
| ANGANGBA (RED) | kodang machu | the liquid from chewing betel leaf with areca nut | reddish pink |
| ANGANGBA (RED) | mithai machu | a particular kind of popular sweet | close to above |
| ANGANGBA (RED) | ureirom machu | bixa orellana | close to above |
| ANGANGBA (RED) | thangching mapan machu | euryle ferox flower | blackish pink |
| ASANGBA (GREEN) | khongtrummaku machu | bottle gourd skin | light green |
| ASANGBA (GREEN) | pangkhokla machu | taro leaf | blackish green |
| ASANGBA (GREEN) | wana machu | bamboo leaf | more blackish green |
| ASANGBA (GREEN) | tingkhak mathibong machu | caterpillar intestine | very dark green |
| ASANGBA (GREEN) | hichang machu | moss | dark green |
| ASANGBA (GREEN) | Ureng | baby leaf | green |
| ASANGBA (GREEN) | naspati machu | pears | faded green |
| ASANGBA (GREEN) | chorphon machu | olive fruit | dull faded green |
| ASANGBA (GREEN) | santhi machu | cow dung | close to above |
| HANGKAMPAN (YELLOW) | hangkam maru machu | mustard flower before it blooms | light yellow |
| HANGKAMPAN (YELLOW) | komlarong machu | orange | reddish yellow |
| HANGKAMPAN (YELLOW) | sana machu | gold | gold colour |
| HANGKAMPAN (YELLOW) | mei machu | fire | blackish yellow |
| HANGKAMPAN (YELLOW) | meiri machu | flame | reddish blackish yellow |
| HANGKAMPAN (YELLOW) | yaingang machu | Turmeric | deep reddish yellow |
| HIKOK (BLUE) | khoimu machu | Bee | blackish blue |
| HIKOK (BLUE) | ising machu | water | light blue |
| HIKOK (BLUE) | sorraren machu | the sky | close to above |
| HIKOK (BLUE) | atiya machu | the sky | close to above |
| HIKOK (BLUE) | meikhet machu | match stick | reddish blue |
| HIKOK (BLUE) | pitruklei machu | globe amaranth (a kind of flower) | pinkish blue |
| HIKOK (BLUE) | centre phres machu | wrapper of 'centre fresh'(a popular sweing gum) | deep blue |
| HIKOK (BLUE) | pangg/kan khamen machu | egg plant | very dark blue |
| HIKOK (BLUE) | kabokang mapan machu | water hyacinth flower | close to above |
| HIKOK (BLUE) | samballei machu | duranta (golden dewdrop flower) | close to above |
| HIKOK (BLUE) | leitan machu | a type soil used for plastering wall | close to above |

=== Fruit colours ===
| Fruit colours | the exact thing | English translation |
|---|---|---|
| chorphon machu | olive fruit | Dull in taro leave |
| heikha apatpa machu | rotten plum | Lighter in blue |
| kaphoi mapan machu | pomegranate flower | Less reddish than Roselle flower colour |
| komlarong machu | Orange | A bit brick colour in yellow |
| naspati machu | Pears | faded green |

=== Vegetable colours ===
| Vegetable colours | the exact thing | English translation |
|---|---|---|
| khontrum maku machu | bottle gourd skin | light green |
| khanmen mapan machu | eggplant flower | A bit reddish in extreme blue |
| hangkam maru pokhaibi machu | mustard flower before it blooms | A bit lighter in yellow |
| muksori machu | red lentil (pulse) | A bit brick colour in yellow |
| pangkhokla machu | taro leave | A bit darker than green |
| hichang machu | Moss | A bit dark in green |
| parmasika khamen machu | japanese eggplant | Blackish in blue |
| pangkan khamen machu | egg plant | Darker than deep dark blue |
| soukri mapan machu | roselle flower | Reddish with bit of Euryale ferox colour |
| thangching mapan machu | euryale ferox flower | A bit black in pink |
| yaingang machu | Turmeric | With red in yellow |

=== Animal colours ===
| Animal colours | the exact thing | English translation |
|---|---|---|
| samu machu | Elephant | dark grey |
| santhi machu | cow dung | the colour between |
| tenawa machu | Parrot | light green |

=== Flower colours ===
| Flower colours | the exact thing | English translation |
|---|---|---|
| kurao mapan machu | red coral flower | Extreme red |
| kabirei machu | Oleander | A bit reddish than light pink |
| kabokang mapan machu | water hyacinth flower | Extreme light in blue |
| pitruklei machu | globe amaranth | A bit pinkish in blue |
| samballei mapan machu | duranta flower (golden dew drop) | slightly deep blue |
| ureirom machu | bixa oxellana | A bit darker in lentil |

=== Curry colours ===
| Curry colours | the exact thing | English translation |
|---|---|---|
| aloo ironba machu | potato chutney | creamish |
| nga thongba machu | fish curry | reddish yellowish blackish |

=== Edible colours ===
| Edible colours | the exact thing | English translation |
|---|---|---|
| cha machu | tea with milk | cream colour |
| centre phres machu | wrapper of 'centre fresh'(a popular sweing gum) | deep blue |
| kophi machu | coffee with milk | creamish |
| kodang machu | the liquid from chewing beetle nut with areca nut | reddish pink |
| sangkom mapram machu | the upper layer of boiled milk | slightly reddish white |

=== Insect colours ===
| Insect colours | the thing | English translation |
|---|---|---|
| khoimu machu | Bee | blackish blueish |
| tandon machu | Firefly | faded ureng |
| tingkhak mathibok | caterpillar's intestine | Extreme green |
| timunapun machu | blind snake | A bit reddish and bluish in black |

=== Fire colours ===
| Fire colours | the exact thing | English translation |
|---|---|---|
| lakang machu | the dirt gathered in the kitchen, near the cooking hearth | slightly reddish black |
| meikhet machu | match stick | reddish blue |
| mei machu | Fire | A bit blackish in yellow |
| meiri machu | Fame | Reddish in yellow |

== See also ==
- Meitei clothing in Myanmar
- Colour wheel
- Colour theory
