= Chenglei dynasty =

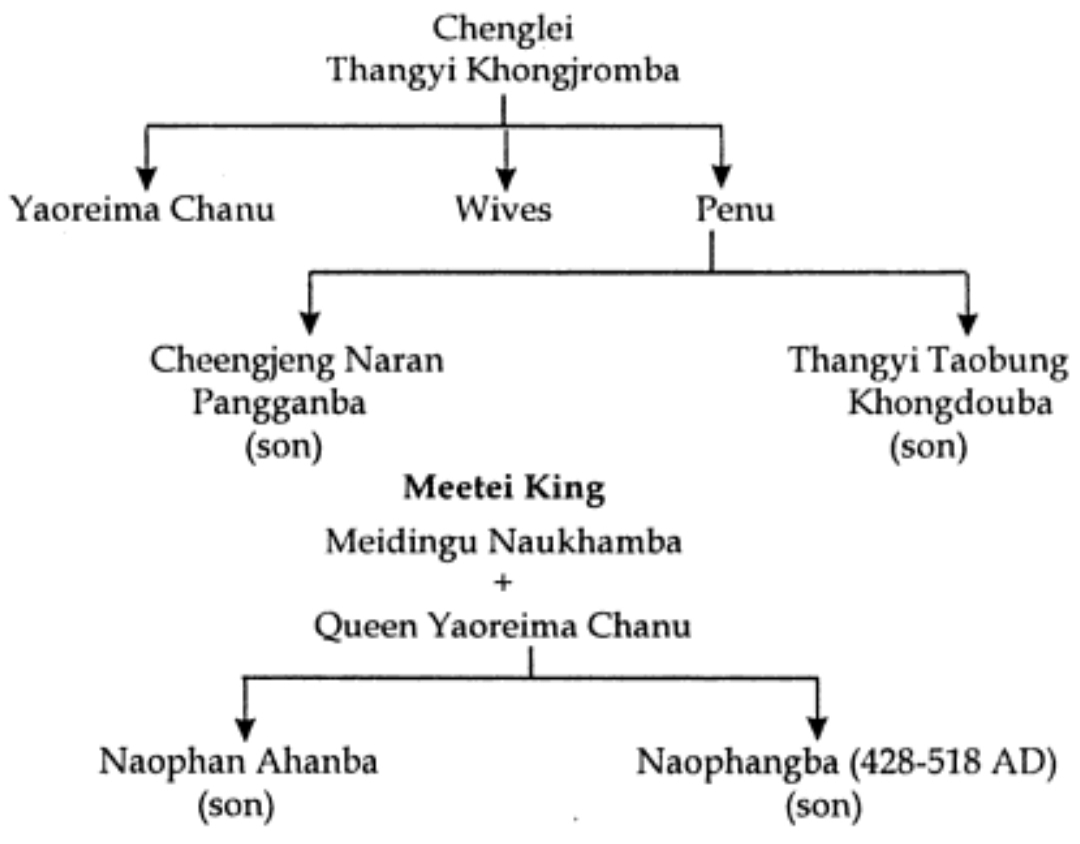
Relationship between the Chenglei dynasty (Sarang Leishangthem group) & the Ningthouja dynasty (Mangang or dominant Meitei group) through Lady Yaoreima Chanu, the queen of both ruling houses

Chenglei dynasty (ꯆꯦꯡꯂꯩ ꯅꯤꯡꯊꯧ ꯃꯌꯨꯝ, chenglei ningthou mayum, transl. House of the kings of Chenglei) was one of the ruling royal houses of ancient Kangleipak (early Manipur). Their genealogy is documented in the literary and historical narratives of ancient Meitei literature, including their dynastic chronicle, known as the Chengleiron. The dynasty is remembered for its mytho-historical rulers, their interaction with other royal dynastic clans (especially the Ningthouja dynasty and the Luwang dynasty) of Meitei confederacy, and its contributions to early literature and culture of Meitei civilisation. The Chengleis played an influential role in the political, mythological, and genealogical history of ancient Manipur.

The Chenglei kings governed their kingdom from their administrative seat at Wangoi Kangla. They believed in their ancestral deity, Nungou Yimthinba.

== Royal family members ==
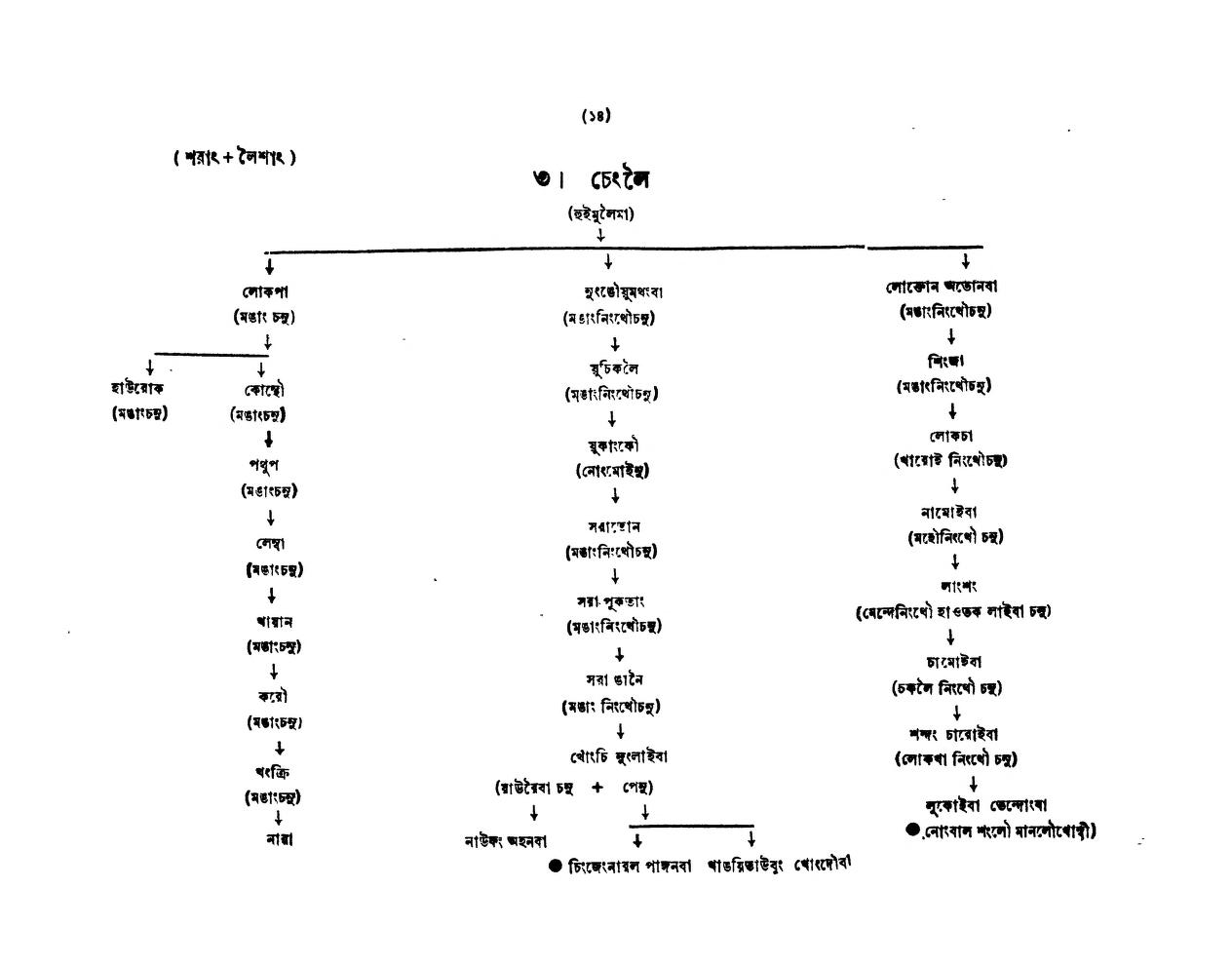
Genealogy of the earliest rulers of Chenglei dynasty of Ancient Kangleipak civilization, written in the Eastern Nagari script (Bengali alphabet) in the Meitei language Sagei-Sallairol text

The Chenglei dynasty is closely associated with Chengleiron, one of the earliest recorded literary works in the classical Meitei language. The title means "the story of the Chengleis," and the text blends Meitei mythology, royal history, and moral lessons. It begins with the rule of King Thangyi Khongjromba, a major figure in Chenglei tradition.

=== Thangyi Khongjromba ===
Chenglei King Khongjromba was married to Lady Penu Leimaren, daughter of the Lord Soraren, and had two sons. Chingjen Naran Panganba, the elder son, was known for his supernatural strength and mythical adventures. Thangyi Taobung Khongdouba, the younger son, eventually succeeded the throne of the Chenglei kingdom.

=== Chingjen Naran Panganba ===
Although the elder prince, Chingjen Naran Panganba, was an exceptional child with divine strength, he did not become king. Instead, after performing miraculous feats as a child, such as helping his father build defensive embankments and uprooting a massive tree, he left his family to explore lands beyond the western mountains. His departure, despite pleas from his father, left the throne open for his younger brother. Panganba's name became symbolic in later literatures to describe individuals of great strength and heroism, in Meitei civilisation.

=== Thangyi Taobung Khongdouba ===
Thangyi Taobung Khongdouba, the younger son of King Khongjromba and Queen Penu Leimaren, ascended the Chenglei throne after his father's reign. He married Lady Toibi Leima, a princess of the Luwang dynasty, another noble house of ancient Kangleipak. Their union symbolized political and dynastic alliance between the Chengleis and the Luwangs.

Queen Toibi Leima later suffered from a severe illness and returned to her parental home for recovery. After neglecting her during her illness, Khongdouba later saw her again during a hunting expedition and, moved by her restored beauty, brought her back through the aid of a cunning servant. This event shows the emotional and social complexities of royal life in early society of Kangleipak.

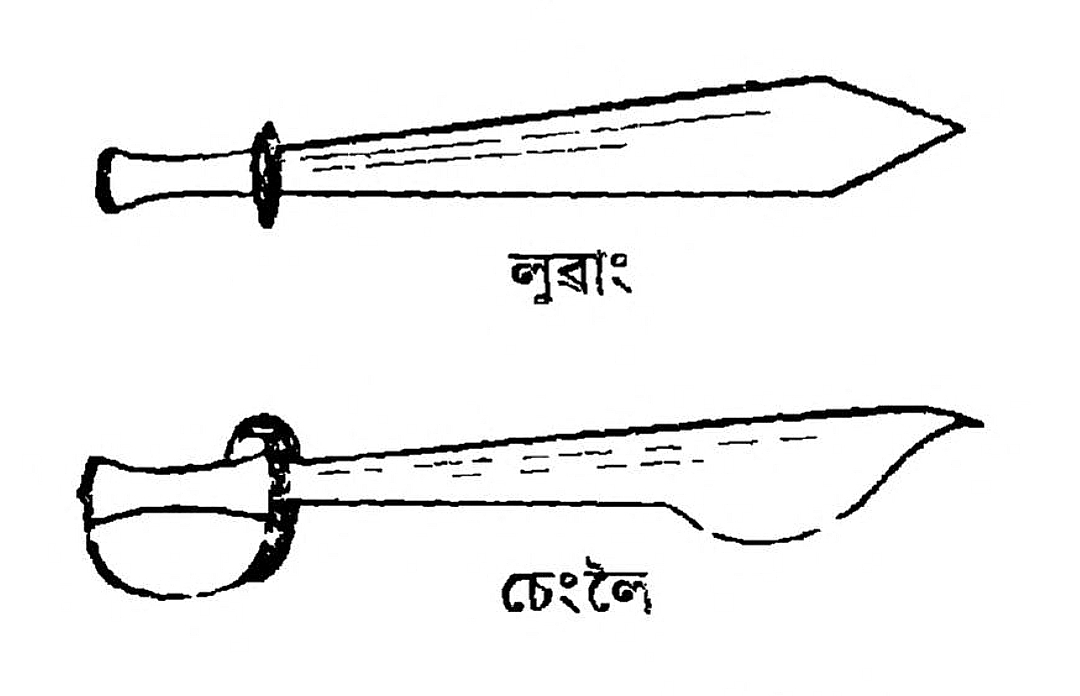
Holy & sacred swords of the Luwang & Chenglei Yek Salai groups (clans/dynasties) of Meitei confederacy of ancient Kangleipak

== Interaction with the Ningthouja dynasty ==
The Chenglei dynasty also had a direct connection with the Ningthouja dynasty, the dominant royal line of Kangleipak. Chenglei King Khongjromba’s first wife (before Queen Penu Leimaren) had been abducted by Ningthouja ruler Naokhamba, the Meitei king, who reigned from 411 to 428 CE. With the Ningthouja king, she bore a son, who later became King Naophangba (428–518 CE) of the Meiteis. Thus, the Chenglei maternal bloodline became part of the Ningthouja royal lineage, creating a significant genealogical and political link between the two dynasties.

== Literary and cultural legacy ==
The Chenglei dynasty’s legacy includes moral reflections, praise for patron kings, and religious invocations. The Chenglei royal dynastic chronicle portrays both legendary acts, such as those of Prince Panganba, and emotionally rich human experiences, such as the story of Queen Toibi Leima. Their dynasty eventually became absorbed into the more dominant Ningthouja polity through Meitei confederacy. However, their unique royal traditions and dynastic lineage continued to be honored in oral and literary traditions.

== See also ==
- Khuman dynasty
- Khuman kingdom
- Khuman Kangleirol
- Moirang kingdom
- Moirang Kangleirol
