= Yengkhom =

Meetei Manipuri surname

Yengkhom is a Meetei surname or family name which has Indian origin. People of this family mainly inhabit in Manipur, India.

Their mythical progenitor was Thamanglang.
