= Thamanglang =

- Progenitor of Yengkhom, Keithellakpam and Kheirom
- Born: Ancient Manipur (Antique Kangleipak)
- House: Ningthouja dynasty
- Father: King Naophangba of Ningthouja dynasty
- Mother: Queen Yaoreibi of Luwang dynasty
- Religion: Meiteism of Sanamahism
- Occupation: Prince of Ningthouja dynasty

Thamanglang was a prince of the Ningthouja dynasty of Ancient Manipur (Antique Kangleipak). He is a son of King Naophangba of Ningthouja dynasty and Queen Yaoreibi of Luwang dynasty. He is a step brother of Sameirang, who later became the king. He is the progenitor of the yumnaks including Yengkhom, Keithellakpam and Kheirom of the Ningthouja dynasty of the present day Meitei ethnicity.
