= Coordinating Committee on Manipur Integrity =

- Founded: 21 October 2019
- Type: Meitei activist organisation
- Purpose: Preserving integrity of Manipur
- Headquarters: Lamphel, Imphal
- Region served: Imphal Valley, Manipur, India
- Coordinator: Somorendro Thokchom
- Spokesperson: Khuraijam Athouba

The Coordinating Committee on Manipur Integrity (COCOMI) is a joint body of Meitei civil society organisations in the Indian state of Manipur. It came into being in 2019 in the wake of the peace talks between the Indian government and Naga rebel groups, as the latter sought autonomy and integration of the Naga-inhabited areas of Manipur into a Greater Nagaland. COCOMI campaigns for maintaining the "territorial integrity" of Manipur, which was a princely state under the British Raj and became part of the Indian Union upon India's Independence.

During the 2023–2024 Manipur violence, COCOMI acted as the main representative body of the Meitei community.

== Organisation ==
COCOMI is an activist body in Manipur that strives for preserving the "integrity" of Manipur, which essentially means preserving the territory of Manipur as it existed as a princely state at the end of British Raj in 1947. Any form of division or cession of this territory is sternly opposed. The organisation is described as an "umbrella body" of several civil society organisations of Meitei ethnicity. It was described in October 2019 as having been "recently formed". Its convener at that time was mentioned as Sunil Karam.

In 2023, COCOMI was headed by Jeetendra Ningombam as its coordinator. Upon the end of his term in January 2024, he passed on the office of coordinator to Somorendro Thokchom. (Note: The coordinator's name is also written as "Somendro Thokchom" in some sources.)

== History ==
COCOMI was formed on 21 October 2019 as an umbrella organisation of several Meitei civil society organisations. These were:

- United Committee Manipur (UCM), headed by Sunil Karam
- Committee of Civil Societies of Kangleipak (CCSK), headed by Jeetendra Ningomba
- League of Indigenous People's Upliftment (LIPUL), headed by Somorendro Thokchom
- Ethno Heritage Council (HERICOUN), headed by Longjam Ratankumar
- All Manipur United Clubs Organisation (AMUCO), headed by Ph. Nando Luwang

Sunil Karam and Somorendro Thokchom were elected as the coordinators of the new organisation and the other leaders were named as assistant coordinators.

United Committee Manipur, the best known of these constituents, was founded in July 2001 as an umbrella body in itself. It was formed in response to the extension of the Naga ceasefire agreement to the Naga-inhabited areas of Manipur. In 2024, COCOMI was reported to be operating from the offices of UCM.

=== Indo-Naga peace talks ===
In October 2019, COCOMI launched a mass protest to oppose any deal that could affect the territorial integrity of Manipur during the Indo-Naga peace talks. The then president, Sunil Karam, said that the central government's move to settle the Naga issue without Maniput state's involvement was an "insult" to Manipur.

=== 2023–2024 Manipur violence ===
Ethnic violence between the majority Meitei community and the hill-based Kuki-Zo community broke out on 3 May 2023, causing virtually all of the Meitei people living in Kuki-dominated hills to get displaced to the Valley, and all the Kuki-Zo people living in the Valley to get displaced to the hills. COCOMI was reported to have supported the "age-old tradition of coexistence". But in early June 2023, it organised a people's convention in Imphal East, and declared a "national war against Chin-Kuki narco-terrorists", which was supposed to be fought unitedly by all the "indigenous people of Manipur". It also claimed that, with the declaration of war, a "public emergency" came into force. This convention also rejected the Union Home Minister Amit Shah's appeal to surrender weapons looted from the police armouries and refused combing operations by security forces. However, it backtracked on this resolution the following day.

== See also ==
- Coalition of Indigenes' Rights Campaign, Manipur
- Federation of Haomee
- International Meeteis Forum
