= Mera Hou Chongba =

Festival of Manipur

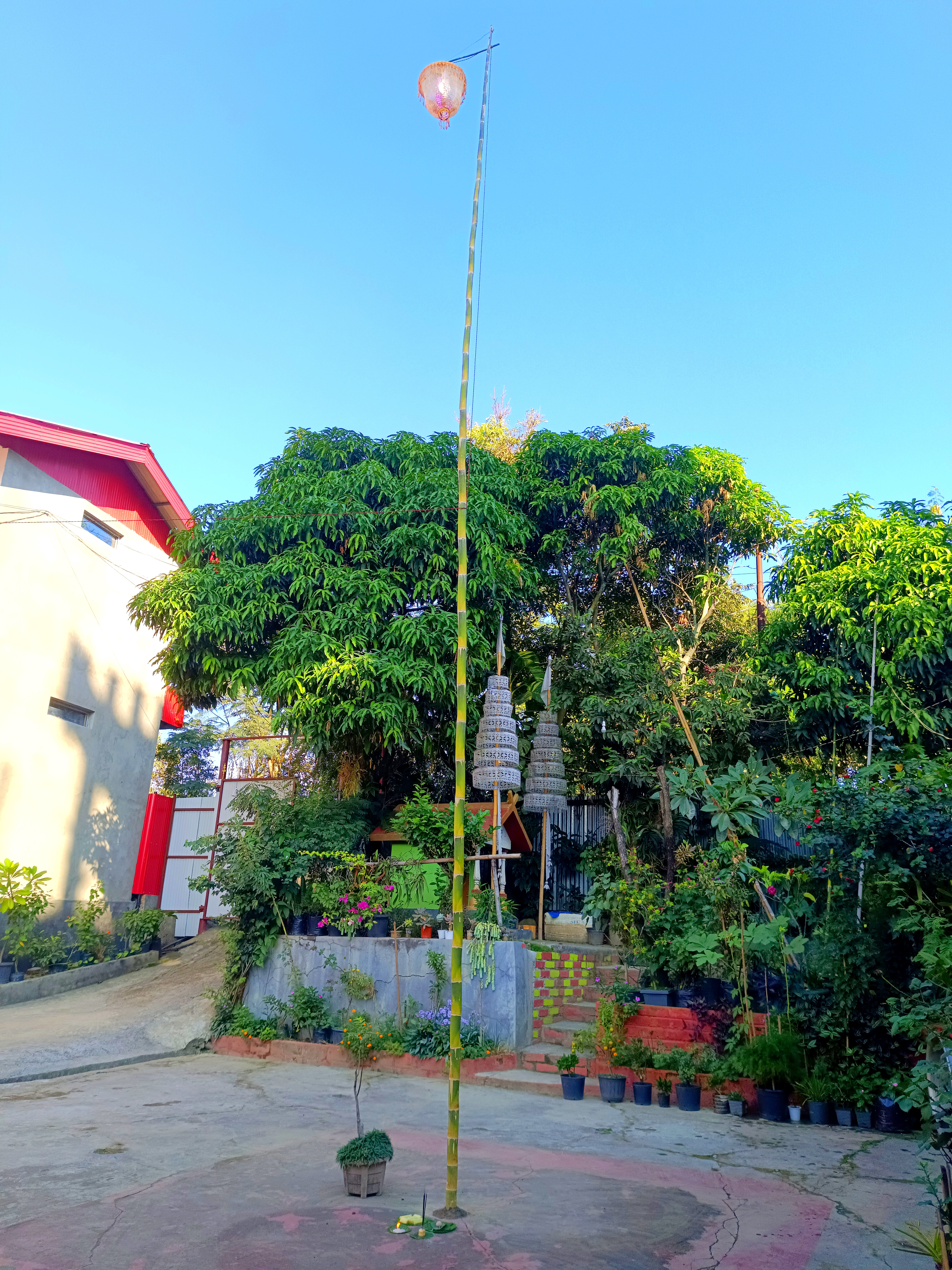
ꯃꯦꯔꯥ ꯊꯥꯎꯃꯩ (Mera Thaomei), A lamp tied to a tall green bamboo pole was lighted and installed during Mera Hou Chongba festival

Mera Hou Chongba or Mera Waayungba or Mera Thaomei Thaanba is the cultural festival of solidarity in Manipur, celebrated by the Meitei people and Naga tribes of Manipur (Liangmai,Tangkhul, Rongmei, Anal, Aimol, Chiru, Chothe, Kharam, Koireng, Kom etc). The day falls on the 15th lunar day of Mera month of the Meitei calendar. The main location for the celebration of the festival is at the Sana Konung, the royal palace of kings of Manipur. On this day, the hill tribes come down to the Valley of Imphal, and gather at the royal palace, and show their cultural dances and other art forms. The day ends with a grand feast, held together with the Meitei people and the tribals, to show solidarity, oneness of all the ethnic groups in the region.

== Backstory of the Mera Thaomei ==
Long ago, two brothers set out on a journey in search of a place to settle. The younger brother chose to settle in the valley, while the elder decided to make his home in the hills. As they parted ways, they comforted each other with a promise—to signal their well-being on the 15th lunar day of the Mera month. The brother in the valley would light a ꯊꯥꯎꯃꯩ (thaomei) and hang it high on a bamboo pole so it could be seen from the hills, while the elder brother would light a fire on the hilltops for his sibling to see. Over time, this simple act of reassurance evolved into a cherished tradition, still observed today.
