= Naophangba =

Ruler of Ancient Manipur

- Monarchy: 427 -517 (1825MF-1915MF)
- Coronation: 427 (1825MF)
- Predecessor: Naokhamba
- Successor: Saameirang
- Spouse: Kaireima of Khuman dynasty and Yaoreibi of Luwang dynasty
- Issue: Sameirang from Kaireima and Thamanglang from Yaoreibi
Names
- Meitingu Naophangpa
Era name and dates
- Ancient Manipur: 427-517 (1825MF - 1915MF)
- Royalty: Ningthouja dynasty
- Religion: Meiteism of Sanamahism
- Occupation: Ruler of Ancient Manipur (Antique Kangleipak)

Meidingu Naophangba (Old Manipuri: Meitingu Naophangpa) was a Meetei ruler of Ningthouja dynasty of Ancient Manipur (Antique Kangleipak). He is the successor of Naokhamba and the predecessor of Sameiraang. He promulgated a proto-Constitution in 429 AD, which later grew into the Loyumba Shinyen, a written constitution in 1100 AD, during the reign of King Loyumba. He is one of the most outstanding figures in the history of Meitei architecture of Ancient Manipur. He laid the foundation stone of the Kangla, the "Namthak Sarongpung", which is the holiest place to the Manipuri ethnicity. During his reign, the coronation hall in the Kangla was inaugurated and a hog was sacrificed. According to the Loyumba Shinyen, he took command from Mangang Luwang Khuman for the administration of justice in the kingdom. According to the Chakparol, the ten villages of the Chakpas separated during his reign. It was right from his reign that the newcomers (immigrants) were assigned and admitted to the yek salai (clans) and the yumnaks (families) of the Meitei ethnicity. According to the Thengkourol, copper and brass were imported from Burma (Old Manipuri: Awaa Leipak) and China (Old Manipuri: Khaaki Leipak) during his reign.

The first seven kings preceding his reign were sometimes considered divine, but it was right from his era that the rulers were usually regarded as human beings. He is remembered for his emphasis on ethics. Though many Manipuri Muslims claim that their earliest ancestors settled in Manipur right from the reign of Naophangba (5th century AD), the claim is clearly contradicted by the fact that Islam and Muslims first set feet in the Indian subcontinent in Gujarat, extreme Western India in 623 AD (7th century AD).
