= International Meeteis Forum =

Meitei advocacy group in Manipur, India

- Founded: 5 December 2012
- Type: Meitei organisation
- Purpose: Assertion of Meitei indigeneity in Manipur
- Headquarters: Imphal
- Region served: Imphal Valley, Manipur, India
- President: R. K. Rajendro (till May 2023)
- Organiser: Ch. Birendra

The International Meeteis Forum (or "International Meitei Forum", IMF) is a Meitei ethnic advocacy group in the Indian state of Manipur. Its objectives are to assert Meitei indigeneity in Manipur, to unify Meiteis around the world, to campaign for the territorial integrity of the Manipur state and to block the influx of alleged foreigners. Founded in 2012 by a retired army officer R. K. Rajendro, (Note: Also referred to as "R. K. Rajendra Singh".) it later teamed up with the Federation of Haomee with similar ideological motivations. Both the organisations generated free-flowing hate speech against the Kuki community of Manipur, labelling them as "immigrants" or "foreigners", (Note: In an open letter to the scholars of Kuki Research Forum in 2015, the Organiser Ch. Birendra addressed them as "D/Descendants of immigrants".) which was instrumental in the generation of 2023 Manipur violence.

== Background ==
The districts of Manipur as of 2011. The districts in the middle, the Imphal valley: Imphal East, Imphal West, Thoubal and Bishnupur densely populated and dominated by the Meitei people, whereas the outer districts are primarily hilly, sparsely populated and dominated by non-Meitei peoples. The people in the valley are predominantly Hindu and those in the Hills are primarily Christians.

Manipur is a state in the northeast of India, a former princely state of British Raj, embedded in the Northern Arakan Yoma mountain range. It consists of a 700 square mile valley, mainly populated by the Meitei community, and the surrounding hill regions populated by hill tribes classified as Nagas (in the north) and Kukis (in the south). The hill tribes have long campaigned for autonomy, launching multiple insurgent movements, and the Meitei have consistently blocked all such efforts.

In 2012, the Union Government reached peace agreements with the Naga and Kuki insurgent groups. The Naga group, NSCN-IM, had the ongoing demand for "Greater Nagaland", i.e., to merge the Naga-inhabited areas of Manipur into the Nagaland state. The Kuki groups likewise had the demand for a separate "Kukiland" state for the Kuki-inhabited areas. The International Meeteis Forum was formed in this context, in order to protect the "interest of [the] Meiteis". It argued for the inclusion of the Meiteis in the peace talks, and declared, "no agreement without the consent of Meiteis would be accepted".

Prior to this, the founder R. K. Rajendro had written an article in a newspaper claiming that the Kukis had migrated from Myanmar and the British had planted Kuki settlements in Manipur. A Naga organisation found the argument attractive, and claimed that prior to the 19th and 20th centuries, "our forefathers" had not experienced inter-tribal conflict. This is not in accordance with the historical record as documented by scholars. (Note: Scholar Pum Khan Pau notes that Captain McCulloch, a British resident in Manipur, "found them in the 1840s scattered around the valley of Manipur". McCulloch believed that the "scattering" occurred because they were being pushed north by more powerful tribes to the south, but he did not claim direct knowledge of this fact. McCulloch also stated that Khongjais (Kukis) used to be to the south of the Kabui Nagas (to the west of the Manipur valley) and sometimes made "bloody attacks" on them. Hence he created a string of Kuki villages "as a buffer to the Kabui villages". Thus, the settlements created by McCulloch as a protection for the Naga areas were being interpreted by Rajendro and his Naga followers as encroachments into the Naga areas.)

== Anti-Kuki activism ==
Soon after its formation, the IMF condemned the demand for "Kukiland", claiming that Kukis had recently migrated from Myanmar between 1855 and 1881, and that they numbered only about 8,000 people at that time. The original settlers of Manipur were claimed to have been Meitei and Naga communities, and therefore, the later entrants should be "pushed back". At the same time, grandiose claims were made for the historical extent of Manipur. The Kuki Students Organisation (KSO) responded to the IMF statements as having become a "matter of grave concern". (Note: When Kukis had spread out through the territory of present day Manipur cannot be stated with certainty. The Manipur chronicle Cheitharol Kumbaba has references to prince Herachandra having taken shelter with Kukis (termed "Khongchais") in 1819, during a Burmese occupation of Manipur, and then raising rebellion with their help. References to "Khongchais" in the chronicle date back to 1503.)

As the demand for "Kukiland" as a separate state grew, the IMF also stepped up its attacks on the Kuki community. In 2013, it rejected the Kukis' claim of being one of the indigenous communities of Manipur and announced that it would launch a signature campaign against the Kukis for claiming so. It declared that there was a "continuous influx of Kukis" from Myanmar and Muslims from Bangladesh, which was causing a "dangerous demographic change" in Manipur, which would render Meiteis to become a minority.

In 2015, the Kuki Research Forum of scholars responded to a column written by R. K. Rajendro in The Sangai Express, calling his comments "incendiary", "communal" and "exclusivist". Recalling Rajendro's labelling of Kukis as "foreigners", they countered with historical facts and the views of acclaimed historians. They stated that Rajendro's propaganda had no place in a civilised society and called on the media to uphold the ethics of journalism. In response, Ch. Birendra (listed as the Organiser of IMF) wrote another column in the same newspaper, addressing the Kuki Research Forum scholars as "dear descendants of immigrants", and taking personal jibes about holding "double citizenship of both Manipur and Myanmar". He also repeated the usual arguments of IMF labelling Kukis as immigrants and foreigners.

In 2016, journalist Phanjoubam Chingkheinganba countered the narrative of branding Kukis as "foreigners", stating that it was generated by an elderly retired army officer, whose organisation consisted of "less than half a dozen persons". He commented that the retired officer did not seem to grasp the modern meaning of "foreigner" and the discourse was seriously offensive to the Kukis.

However, by 2019, R. K. Rajendro was being listed in the core committed of Federation of Haomee (FoH), a much larger organisation founded on the back of the successful Inner Line Permit movement in Manipur. (Note: Federation of Haomee was founded by S. Jadumani, who had earlier headed Joint Committee on Inner Line Permit System (JCILPS), an organisation representing "xenophobic hegemony of Meitei nationalism".) FoH was focused on the issue of "indigeneity" of Manipur's communities. Rajendro introduced his ideas on the othering of Kukis into FoH, which was used to oppose the Union government's peace talks with Kuki organisations, labelling them as "foreign militant outfits".

In 2022, scholar Haoginlen Chongloi noted that both IMF and FoH had been involved in spreading venomous hate speech directed at the Kukis for several years.

== Impact ==
By 2022, the IMF discourse on the othering of Kukis of Manipur had entered the mainstream of the Meitei society. The chief minister N. Biren Singh branded a human rights cum greater-Kukiland activist, Mark T. Haokip, (Note: Mark T. Haokip, who called himself the President of the "People’s Democratic Republic of Kukiland", described his organisation as a "Human Rights based Non-Violent Political government of the Kuki Nation". According to scholar Thongkholal Haokip, "he discusses on social media about territorial politics in Manipur, drawing from [the] colonial census accounts a century back, and other academic works in recent years." He described him as a "political" victim of the "majoritarian" politics of the Manipur government.) as "Myanmarese", despite he being a descendant of an Indian National Army freedom fighter. New Meitei groups such as the People's Movement for Resurgent Manipur and the Coordinating Committee on Manipur Integrity (COCOMI) replicated the chief minister's branding. The Kuki tribal body Kuki Inpi issued a statement raising an alarm about a "groundswell of Kuki-Chin-Mizophobia" in Manipur and accused the Biren Singh government of "outright abhorrence and racial discrimination" against the Kukis of Manipur.

In the same year, an English translation of R. K. Rajendro's book Manipur after the Coming of Kukis was published, wherein Rajendro characterised the Meiteis and Nagas as natives of Manipur (the "Haomee"), (Note: In the Meitei language, "Haomee" or "Yelhoumee" has the sense of "sons of the soil".) and Kukis as recent arrivals from Burma.

By May 2023, when large-scale violence erupted in Manipur, there were a large number of Meitei organisations subscribing to the view that Kukis were "foreigners" or "outsiders". Pramot Singh, the founder of Meitei Leepun, claimed in an interview on The Wire, that the Kukis were not "part of the family" of Manipur and described them as "tenants" in the state. Several news reports and commentaries pointed out that the discourse had been normalised in the Meitei society. In the first week of violence, 77 Kukis were killed, mostly innocent civilians in the Imphal Valley, as compared to 10 Meiteis.

== Bibliography ==
- Guite, Jangkhomang (2018), Against State, against History: Freedom, Resistance, and Statelessness in Upland Northeast India, Oxford University Press, ISBN 9780199094158
- Haokip, Seilienmang (2023), "Memory and kinship across the Indo–Myanmar border: A study of the lived experiences of displaced Kuki families", Memory Studies, doi:10.1177/17506980231188484
- Haokip, Thongkholal (2016), "Spurn Thy Neighbour: The Politics of Indigeneity in Manipur", Studies in Indian Politics, 4 (2): 178–190, doi:10.1177/2321023016665526
- Haokip, Thongkholal (September 2017), "Dereliction of Duties or the Politics of 'Political Quadrangle'? The Governor, Hill Areas Committee and Upsurge in the Hills of Manipur", Indian Journal of Public Administration, 63 (3): 456–474, doi:10.1177/0019556117720606
- Haokip, Thongkholal (January 2023), "Territoriality, Conflict and Citizenship in the India–Myanmar Borderlands", The Journal of Indian and Asian Studies, 4 (1), doi:10.1142/S2717541323500018
- McCulloch, W. (1859). Account of the Valley of Munnipore and of the Hill Tribes. Selections from the Records of the Government of India (Foreign Department). Calcutta: Bengal Printing Company. OCLC 249105916 – via archive.org.
- Parratt, Saroj Nalini Arambam (2009). The Court Chronicle of the Kings of Manipur: The Cheitharon Kumpapa, Volume 2. Foundation Books / Cambridge University Press India. ISBN 978-81-7596-854-7.
- Pau, Pum Khan (2019), Indo-Burma Frontier and the Making of the Chin Hills: Empire and Resistance, Taylor & Francis, ISBN 9781000507454
