= Keithellakpam =

Meetei surname

Keithellakpam is a Meetei surname or family name which has Indian origin.

People of this family mainly inhabit in Manipur, India.

Their mythical progenitor was Thamanglang.
