= Sana Konung =

Palace in India

Coordinates: 24.79699°N 93.94749°E

- Interactive map of Sana Konung
- Location: Imphal, Manipur, India

History
- Built: 1904–1908

Site notes
- Area: 56 m × 31.3 m
- Governing body: Titular King of Manipur (Leishemba Sanajaoba)

The Sana Konung (Meitei: ꯁꯅꯥ ꯀꯣꯅꯨꯡ, romanized: sa-naa ko-noong, lit. '"Golden Palace" or "Royal Palace"') is the royal palace of the rulers of Manipur and their present-day descendants. After the 1891 Anglo-Manipur War, the British took over the Kangla Palace, and Sana Konung was built as the new royal residence, first occupied by Maharaja Churachand Singh in 1908.

== Construction ==
The palace was commissioned in 1904–05, and the building materials are said to have costed Rs. 12,853. The structure occupied an area of 56 by 31.3 metres. The palace was designed on a mixed pattern of Mongol, Hindu and English architectures. It was completed in 1908.

The neighbouring Shree Govindajee Temple was also constructed at the same time and was regarded as part of the palace complex.

== History ==
After Churachand Singh, the Konung palace became the official residence of his successors Bodhchandra Singh, Okendrajit Singh and Leishemba Sanajaoba. The abolition of privy purses by the Government of India in 1971 caused loss of income to the-then titular king Okendrajit Singh, and led him to sell off much of the land surrounding the palace. The Government of Manipur argued that high-rise buildings had gotten constructed in the area, causing it to lose its traditional character. In 2013, the government proposed to take over the palace and turn it into a museum. However, protests in Imphal and Ukhrul led it to backtrack.

== Present status ==
At present, under titular king Leishemba Sanajaoba, Manipur's "independence day" on 14 August is celebrated by hoisting the red flag decorated with the image of Pakhangba (the legendary ancestor and a Meitei deity). The palace serves as the centre of celebrations of traditional Meitei festival Mera Hou Chongba. It is also a hub of activity for protests against the merger of Manipur into India. During the 2015 protests, the Coalition for Indigenous Rights Campaign (CIRCA) held its main function at the palace and hoisted the indigenous flag half mast. The titular king gave speeches demanding the "pre-merger status" for Manipur and claimed that the demand was not "against the nation".

In recent years, the oath-taking ceremonies for Arambai Tenggol cadres have been held at the palace. In January 2024, the Union Home Ministry officials came to meet the Arambai Tenggol activists, for a meeting held at the palace near the "base of the royal flag". The office of Meitei Leepun is also listed as Sana Konung.
