= Tuibong =

Village in Churachandpurrr district, Manipur, India

Coordinates: 24.3610°N 93.7014°E

Tuibong or Tuibuang is a sub division in Churachandpur district. The office of Tuibong subdivision is located at Kholmun village.
