= Federation of Haomee =

Civil society organisation in Manipur, India

- Founded: 12 October 2017
- Type: Civil society organisation
- Purpose: Campaigning for "indigenous communities" of Manipur
- Headquarters: Imphal
- Region served: Imphal Valley, Manipur, India
- President: Sapamcha Jadumani
- Vice-President: Kh. Kabui
- Convenor of core committee: R. K. Rajendra Singh (till May 2023)

The Federation of Haomee is a Meitei-led civil society organisation based in the Imphal Valley of Manipur, India. In addition to Meiteis, it has participation from some Naga groups. The organisation claims to campaign for the rights of the "indigenous communities" of Manipur, including the Meitei and Naga people among them, but excluding the Kuki people. It has published a book titled Manipur after the Coming of Kukis authored by one of its functionaries R. K. Rajendra Singh, arguing that Kukis "arrived" in Manipur a century ago and transformed Manipur in some way. Scholars have called it a "vigilante organisation" that has generated a "free flow" of hate speech against the Kukis of Manipur.

== Background ==
The Federation of Haomee appears to have been created by the joining of forces of two movements: the International Meitei Forum, founded by R. K. Rajendra Singh in 2012, and the Joint Committee on Inner Line Permit System, headed by Sapamcha Jadumani, which was reportedly in existence in various forms since 1997.

The International Meitei Forum (IMF) was formed around the time the Union Government had reached peace agreements with the Naga and Kuki militant groups. The Naga groups were fighting for a 'Greater Nagaland', while the Kuki groups were demanding a Kuki state. Under the circumstances, IMF demanded representation of Meiteis in the dialogues. It also claimed the preservation of the "integrity of Manipur" as one of its objectives. By 2013, it was declaring an intention to launch a signature campaign against the Kuki tribes claiming to be one of the indigenous communities of Manipur. By 2015, its chief R. K. Rajendra Singh (Note: His name is also often mentioned as "R. K. Rajendro".) was asserting that Kukis were "foreigners", and was making, in the words of the Kuki Research Forum (of scholars), "incendiary, communal and exclusivist statements".

In 2006, it was reported that Sapamcha Jadumani, acting as the president of Federation of Regional Indigenous Societies (FREINDS), met the Manipur chief minister Okram Ibobi Singh to impress upon him the need for the introduction of Inner Line Permit in the state. It was claimed that 704,000 migrants had settled in the state of Manipur and they were able to play a decisive role in 15 assembly constituencies. “Outsiders are welcome for business. But they must not try to enter electoral politics by acquiring permanent residency,” he commented. In 2012, his organisation was called Joint Committee on Inner Line Permit (JCILP), which is said to have launched a "relentless campaign" to force the state assembly to pass a resolution in favour of instituting the Inner Line Permit system. However, the Union Home Ministry is reported to have opposed the demand and asked the Manipur government to take effective steps to defuse the crisis.
