= Chenglei =

Clan of the Indian ethnic group, Meetei

Chenglei (Salai Leishangthem)
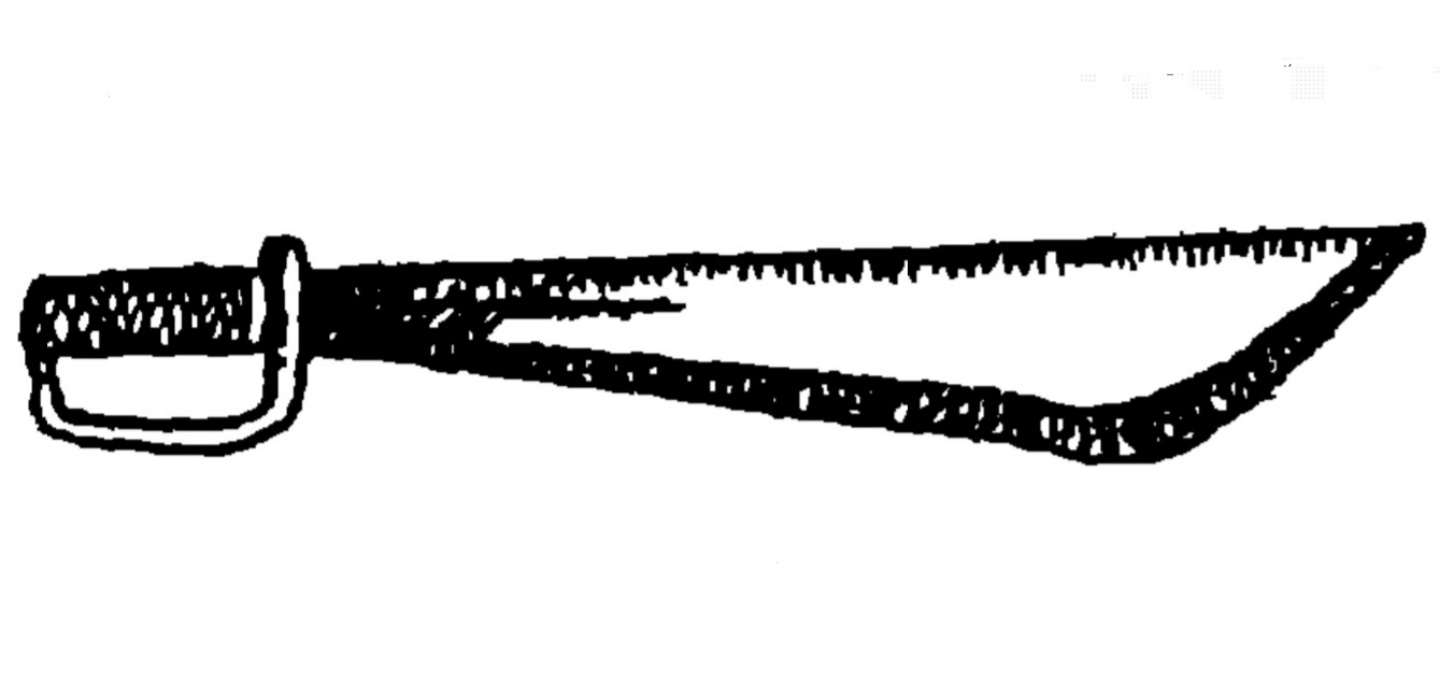
- Chenglei (Salang Leishangthem) dynasty sword, a Meitei traditional weapon

Profile
- Country: India
- Region: Manipur
- Ethnicity: Meitei people

Chief
- Chenglei Iputhou
Clan branches
#Number of families

Chenglei or Salai Leishangthem or Salang Leishangthem or Sarang Leishangthem is a group of people, which is recognized as one of the seven Yek Salai clans of the composite Meitei confederacy. It consists of numerous Yumnaks which are native peoples of ancient Kangleipak (now Manipur), one of the states of India.

In the flag of Kangleipak, the green color represents the Chenglei group of Meitei people.

== Number of families ==
Meitei sub-groups	Romanisation	Number of families/surnames (according to N. Monihar)	Number of families/surnames (according to Khomdon Lisam)	Number of families/surnames (according to T.C. Hodson)	Number of families/surnames (according to Manipur Mirror)	Number of families/surnames (according to MASTEC)
ꯁꯂꯥꯡ ꯂꯩꯁꯥꯡꯊꯦꯝ (ꯁꯂꯥꯏ ꯂꯩꯁꯥꯡꯊꯦꯝ)	Chenglei (Sarang / Salang / Salai Leishangthem)	62	45	41	65	35

== See also ==
- Mangang
- Luwang
- Khuman
- Angom
- Kha Nganpa
- Moilang
