= Meitei calendar =

Calendar of Meitei people

The Meitei calendar (Meitei: ꯃꯩꯇꯩ ꯊꯥꯄꯥꯟꯂꯣꯟ, romanized: Meitei Thaapaanlon) or the Manipuri calendar (Meitei: ꯃꯅꯤꯄꯨꯔꯤ ꯊꯥꯄꯥꯟꯂꯣꯟ, romanized: Manipuri Thaapaanlon) or the Kangleipak calendar (Meitei: ꯀꯪꯂꯩꯄꯥꯛ ꯊꯥꯄꯥꯟꯂꯣꯟ, romanized: Kangleipaak Thaapaanlon) or the Maliyapham Palcha Kumshing (Meitei: ꯃꯂꯤꯌꯥꯐꯝ ꯄꯥꯜꯆꯥ ꯀꯨꯝꯁꯤꯡ, romanized: Maleeyaapham Paalchaa Koomsing) is a lunar calendar used by the Meitei people of Manipur for their religious, agricultural and other cultural activities. New moon is counted at the end of each month and has twelve months in total. The concept of era in Meitei calendar was first developed by Emperor Maliyafam Palcha, in the year 1397 BCE (Palcha Era), in the realm of ancient Kangleipak (in present-day Manipur). It is believed that the 2nd, 3rd, 4th, 6th and 7th months of the Meitei calendar were named after Poireiton's agricultural activities. Similar to Gregorian calendar, the Meitei calendar also consists of twelve months and seven days but the starting date with the Gregorian calendar is different. The new year day known as, Sajibu Cheiraoba is celebrated on the 1st day of the month Sajibu.

== Days ==
Sl. No.	Ancient Meitei	Latin-Roman transliteration	Modern Meitei	Latin-Roman transliteration	Roman equivalents	Ruling heavenly bodies
1	ꯅꯣꯡꯃꯥꯢꯆꯤꯡ	Nongmaiching	ꯅꯣꯡꯃꯥꯢꯖꯤꯡ	Nongmaijing	Sunday	Sun
2	ꯅꯤꯡꯊꯧꯀꯥꯄ	Ningthoukaapa	ꯅꯤꯡꯊꯧꯀꯥꯕ	Ningthoukaaba	Monday	Moon
3	ꯂꯩꯄꯥꯛꯄꯣꯛꯄ	Leipaakpokpa	ꯂꯩꯕꯥꯛꯄꯣꯛꯄ	Leibaakpokpa	Tuesday	Mars
4	ꯌꯨꯝꯁꯥꯀꯩꯁꯥ	Yumsakeisa	ꯌꯨꯝꯁꯀꯩꯁ	Yumsakeisa	Wednesday	Mercury
5	ꯁꯥꯀꯣꯜꯁꯦꯟ	Sakolsen	ꯁꯒꯣꯜꯁꯦꯟ	Sagolsen	Thursday	Jupiter
6	ꯏꯂꯥꯢ	Eelai	ꯏꯔꯥꯢ	Eerai	Friday	Venus
7	ꯊꯥꯡꯆ	Thaangcha	ꯊꯥꯡꯖ	Thaangja	Saturday	Saturn

== Months ==
Ancient Meitei	Latin-Roman transliteration	Modern Meitei	Latin-Roman transliteration	Gregorian-Roman equivalents
ꯁꯆꯤꯐꯣꯢ (ꯆꯤꯟꯄꯤ)	Sachiphoy (Chinpi)	ꯁꯖꯤꯕꯨ	Sajibu	Apr-May
ꯀꯥꯟꯄꯤ	Kaanpee	ꯀꯥꯂꯦꯟ	Kaalen	May-Jun
ꯑꯁꯥꯎ	Asaau	ꯏꯉꯥ	Ee-ngaa	Jun-Jul
ꯍꯥꯂꯦꯡ	Haaleng	ꯏꯉꯦꯟ	Ee-ngen	Jul-Aug
ꯋꯥꯟꯇꯠ	Waantat	ꯊꯧꯋꯥꯟ	Thouwaan	Aug-Sept
ꯑꯆꯤꯠ (ꯂꯥꯡꯄꯟ)	Achit (Laangpan)	ꯂꯥꯡꯕꯟ	Laangban	Sept-Oct
ꯑꯥꯂꯦ (ꯃꯦꯂꯥ)	Aale (Melaa)	ꯃꯦꯔꯥ	Meraa	Oct-Nov
ꯆꯤꯛꯊꯝ (ꯍꯤꯌꯥꯡꯀꯩ)	Chiktham (Hiyaangkei)	ꯍꯤꯌꯥꯡꯒꯩ	Heeyaangei	Nov-Dec
ꯎꯟꯊꯝ	Untham	ꯄꯣꯢꯅꯨ	Poinu	Dec-Jan
ꯏꯟꯊꯝ	Eentham	ꯋꯥꯛꯆꯤꯡ	Waakching	Jan-Feb
ꯑꯁꯤꯠ (ꯐꯥꯢꯂꯦꯜ)	Ashit (Phailel)	ꯐꯥꯢꯔꯦꯜ	Fairel	Feb-Mar
ꯊꯥꯄꯤ	Thaapee	ꯂꯝꯇꯥ	Lamtaa	Mar-Apr

== Important days ==
- Ningol Chakouba (ꯅꯤꯉꯣꯜ ꯆꯥꯛꯀꯧꯕ) - 2nd of Hiyangei month
- Sajibu Nongma Panba (ꯁꯖꯤꯕꯨ ꯆꯩꯔꯥꯎꯕ) - 1st of Sajibu month
- Panthoibi Iratpa (ꯄꯥꯟꯊꯣꯢꯕꯤ ꯏꯔꯥꯠꯄ)
- Imoinu Iratpa (ꯏꯃꯣꯢꯅꯨ ꯏꯔꯥꯠꯄ) - 12th of Wakching month
- Sanamahi Ahong Khong Chingba (ꯁꯅꯥꯃꯍꯤ ꯑꯍꯣꯡ ꯈꯣꯡ ꯆꯤꯡꯕ)
- Kwaak Taanba (ꯀ꯭ꯋꯥꯛ ꯇꯥꯟꯕ) - 10th of Mera month
- Yaosang (ꯌꯥꯎꯁꯪ) - 15th of Lamtaa month, full moon
- Heikru Hidongba (ꯍꯩꯀ꯭ꯔꯨ ꯍꯤꯗꯣꯡꯕ) - 11th of Langban month
- Mera Chaorel Houba (ꯃꯦꯔꯥ ꯆꯥꯎꯔꯦꯜ ꯍꯧꯕ) - 1st of Mera month
- Mera Hou Chongba (ꯃꯦꯔꯥ ꯍꯧ ꯆꯣꯡꯕ) - 15th of Mera month

== Preservation ==
Many social associations and organizations are preserving and promoting the traditional calendar of the Meitei people of Manipur.
