= Khamba Thoibi Sheireng =

Poem in Classical Meitei language

- National epic of the Manipuris; National Romantic Legend of Manipur
- by Hijam Anganghal
- Original title: ꯈꯝꯕ ꯊꯣꯏꯕꯤ ꯁꯩꯔꯦꯡ
- Translator: Dr. Jodhachandra Sanasam
- Written: 1940
- Country: Manipur Kingdom (historical); India (current)
- Language: Meitei language (officially known as Manipuri language)
- Subject: Meitei literature (Manipuri literature)
- Genre(s): Epic cycles of incarnations, Epic poetry, National epic
- Publication date: 1940
- Media type: book
- Lines: 39,000 (8 volumes)

The Khamba Thoibi Sheireng, also spelled as the Khamba Thoibi Seireng (Meitei: ꯈꯝꯕ ꯊꯣꯏꯕꯤ ꯁꯩꯔꯦꯡ, lit. 'Poem on Khamba Thoibi'), is a Classical Meitei language epic poem based on the ancient love story of Khuman prince Khamba and Moirang princess Thoibi of Ancient Moirang kingdom (Note: Moirang was an independent kingdom in early times, though later became a province of a unified kingdom, called Manipur Kingdom.) of Ancient Kangleipak (early Manipur). It is the magnum opus of Hijam Anganghal, the "Bard of Samurou." It is regarded as the national epic of the Manipuris. It is regarded as the greatest of all the epic poems in Meitei literature, with 39,000 verses, thereby being the third longest Indian epic poem, next to the Mahabharata and the Ramayana.

The Khamba Thoibi Sheireng is often considered to be in a status of “mahakavya” (transl. great epic; court epic), and its author Hijam Anganghal , isaconsidered to be “mahakavi” (transl. great poet; classical poet). For composing the epic, Anganghal was honoured by the Manipuri Sahitya Parishad,with the title “Kabiratna” in 1948.

The epic saga is based on the ancient classic of Khamba and Thoibi, also referred to as the "National Romantic Legend of Manipur" by Suniti Kumar Chatterjee, as well as one of the 7 epic cycles of incarnations, constituting the Moirang Kangleirol of Ancient Moirang.

Another remarkable achievement of Meitei cultural heritage, directly related to the Khamba Thoibi epic poem, is Khamba Thoibi Jagoi (Meitei: ꯈꯝꯕ ꯊꯣꯢꯕꯤ ꯖꯒꯣꯢ, lit. 'Khamba Thoibi classical dance'), also known as Khamba Thoibi ballet, which is a traditional Meitei ritualistic and theatrical classical dance form, a part and parcel of the Lai Haraoba performances, performed in honour of God Thangching (Old Manipuri for 'Thangjing'), the national deity of Ancient Moirang realm. Notably, it is one of the classical cultural elements, giving inspirations to the rise of the Manipuri Raas Leela classical dance drama form.

== Textual history ==
The epic poem of the Khamba Thoibi Sheireng was developed by Hijam Anganghal from the "pena sheishak" style of the traditional ballads (Meitei: ꯈꯨꯟꯅꯨꯡ ꯏꯁꯩ, romanized: khunnung eeshei) sung by minstrels with pena (musical instrument). It was adapted from the traditional Meitei ballad known as the "Khamba Thoibi ballad", which is practised even in present times, for a continuous duration of 20–30 days in diverse musical genres.

The Khamba Thoibi Sheireng is regarded as the masterpiece of Hijam Anganghal. The literary work was started in the year 1939 and it was completed in the year 1940.

== Synopsis ==
Khuman Khamba was a terrae filius, brought up by his elder sister Khamnu, who spared no pains for his safety and well-being. By the time he became a youth, he wanted to be of some help to his sister and came out in search of work. On the day he first moved out of his house, he happened to enter the residence of Prince Chingkhu Akhuba, the younger brother of King Chingkhu Telheiba, with its imposing house and spacious premises, and there for the first time saw princess Thoibi, the only daughter of the prince, plying her needle in embroidery. The moment she saw Khamba, handsome and shapely in physique, she gave her heart away to him. But on the part of Khamba, at first he could not harbour such sentiments, as he was conscious of his humble origin.

Another man, Nongban, worked as a foil to Khamba. For a long time, there was no one in Moirang to beat him in race, wrestling and hockey, but with the appearance of Khamba, he is defeated and deprived of this honour. At first, the prince took kindly to Khamba, and despite his offer to maintain the young man in his family, the latter insisted on singing for his supper, which he did by tending the stall-fed fierce bull of the prince. As everybody was curious of Khamba's physical prowess, his sister then kept him in hiding for a while. Thoibi is heartbroken and pines after him. From the grace of God Thangching, the two meet again on the Loktak lake. Their love is steady until the recalcitrant behaviour and overzealous stance of Thoibi provokes her father to come in the way of the lovers in league with Nongban.

Khamba's gradual rise in popularity among the people, winning of the King's favour with the recognition of his identity on account of his superhuman feats in sports and capturing a wild bull singlehanded further enraged the prince. A murder attempt was made on his life ,and subsequently ,Thoibi was sent to exile. However, this act could not, in the least, crush the heart of the lover. Thoibi, on her being called back from disgrace, had the opportune moment of joining with her love. Before the actual marriage took place and in a trial of fate, Nongban fell prey to a tiger wthatKhamba could overcome.

== Structure ==
The epic consists of approximately thirty four thousand lines divided into 81 sections (tangkaks) in 15 chapters (pandups).

== Analysis ==
While analysing the Khamba Thoibi Seireng, Padma Vibhushan awardee Indian Bengali scholar Suniti Kumar Chatterji commented on Hijam Anganghal, the author and the epic, like this:

"I think the entire work should be published and that will at once raise the prestige and dignity of Manipuri literature; and an abstract of the poem in English with translations of typical passages, and a critical study of it, will be desideratum in Indian literature bringing home to the rest of India and to the world what important things, important from the point of view of voicing the aspirations, the ideals and the social and cultural milieu of a whole people are being done in this distant corner of India. The position of our Poet is comparable to that of Rabindranath Tagore in Bengali and Modern Indo-Aryan literature."

— Suniti Kumar Chatterji

Writing on Akashwani All India Radio (AIR), L. Damodar Singh said about the literary work as:

“It is one of the finest stories in literature produced by the Sino-Tibetan people in India.”
. . .
“A gem of a literature which may be compared to any great epic rediscovers the glory of ancient Moirang, the cradle of Manipuri civilisation. It is truly an epic, dignified and elaborate with epic breadth of vision, richness of details, directness of ideas and a faithful portrayal of national life and manners.”

— L. Damodar Singh, All India Radio (AIR)

Some scholars compare the Khamba Thoibi Seireng with the Shahnamah, the national epic of Persia and the Kalevale, the national epic of Finland, as well as Sigurd the Volsung by William Morris.

== Translations ==
The poem was translated into English by Dr. Jodhachandra Sanasam in 2017, for which he received the prestigious Nongthombam Kunjamohan Singh Translation Award 2017, bestowed by the Sahitya Thoupanglup.

== Public response ==
In the year 2014, an academic symposium on the topic "Khamba Thoibi Seirengda Mityeng Ama" (Meitei: ꯈꯝꯕ ꯊꯣꯏꯕꯤ ꯁꯩꯔꯦꯡꯗ ꯃꯤꯠꯌꯦꯡ ꯑꯃ, lit. 'A perspective on the Khamba-Thoibi Poem'), regarding the epic poetry of Hijam Anganghal, was organised by "Nongchup Haram Khorjei Lup" (NAHAKHOL) at Public Theatre Hall, Nambol Phoijing, in Bishnupur district. A book titled "Khamba-Thoibi Seirengda Mityeng" was also published by NAHAKHOL on the occasion.

The "Hijam Anganghal Singh Memorial Lecture 2020-21" was organised at the Artistes’ Dormitory of the Directorate of Arts and Culture in Imphal by the Manipur State Kala Akademi. In the event, scholars discussed about the "Khamba Thoibi Sheireng", as a great contribution of Hijam Anganghal to Meitei literature, that justifiably earned him the title "Mahakavi" (transl. classical poet).

== In popular culture ==
- "Khamba Thoibi" (Meitei: ꯈꯝꯕ ꯊꯣꯏꯕꯤ) is a 1997 Meitei language feature film, based on the epic story by Hijam Anganghal, produced by Moirangthem Nilamani Singh for Anjana Films, and directed by M. Nilamani Singh.

== See also ==
- Numit Kappa
- Akongjamba and Phouoibi
- Henjunaha and Lairoulembi
- Khuyol Haoba and Yaithing Konu
- Kadeng Thangjahanba and Tonu Laijinglembi
- Ura Naha Khongjomba and Pidonnu
- Wanglen Pungdingheiba and Sappa Chanu Silheibi

== Bibliography ==
- Khamba Thoibi Seireng, by Hijam Anganghal Singh, 1986
- Moirang Kangleirol, Khuman Khamba Seitharon, by Laisram Mangi Singh, 1980
- Khamba Thoibi Seireng Ahumsuba Saruk, by Hijam Anganghal
- Full text of "Khamba Thoibi" and poems of Manipur
- Samukhonggi Bichar, by Hijam Anganghal Singh, 1997
- Hijam_Anganghal_Singh, by Elangbam Dinamani
- Abridged from T. C. Hodson's "The Meitheis," 1908
