= Meitei traditional fishing =

Fishing in Meitei civilization

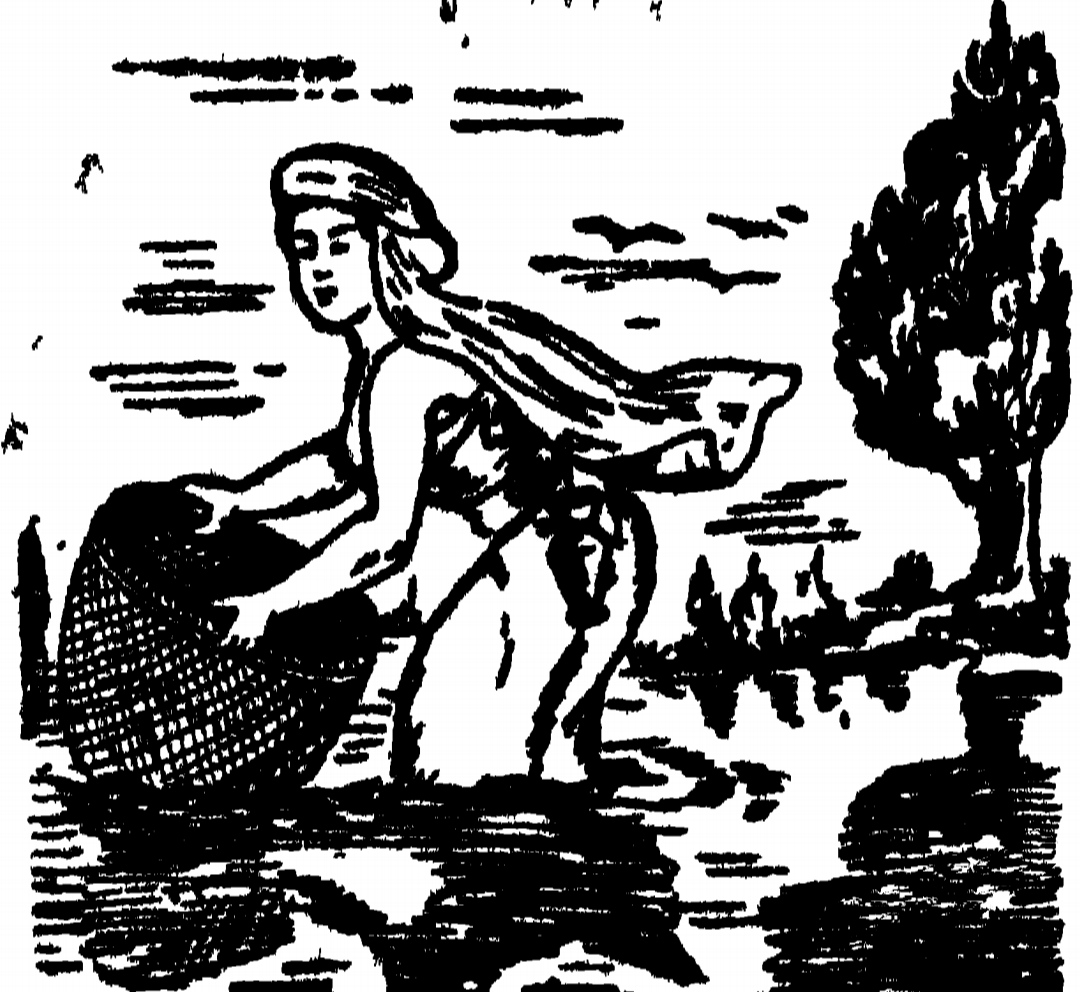
An ancient Meitei woman fishing in a wetland

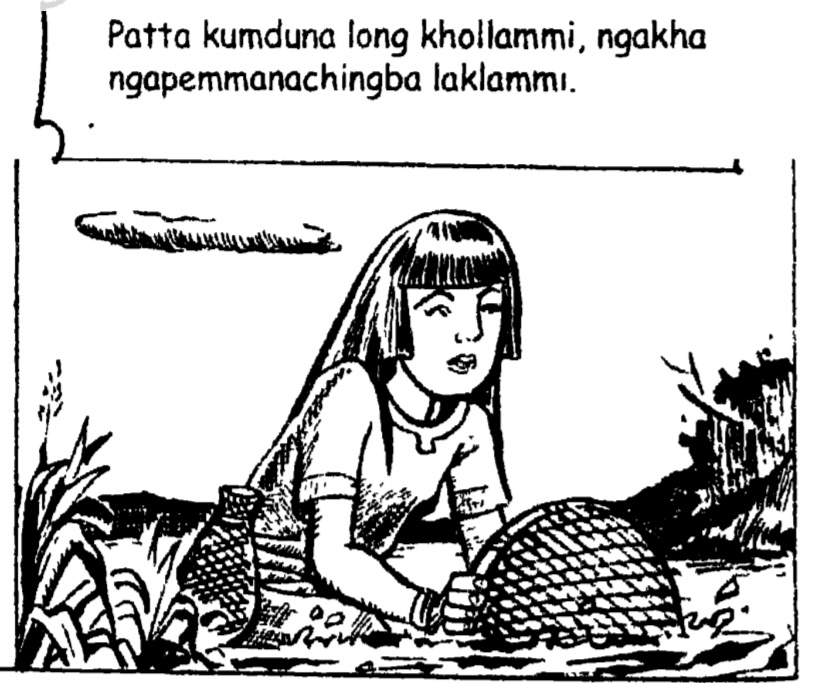
An ancient Meitei lady fishing in a lake

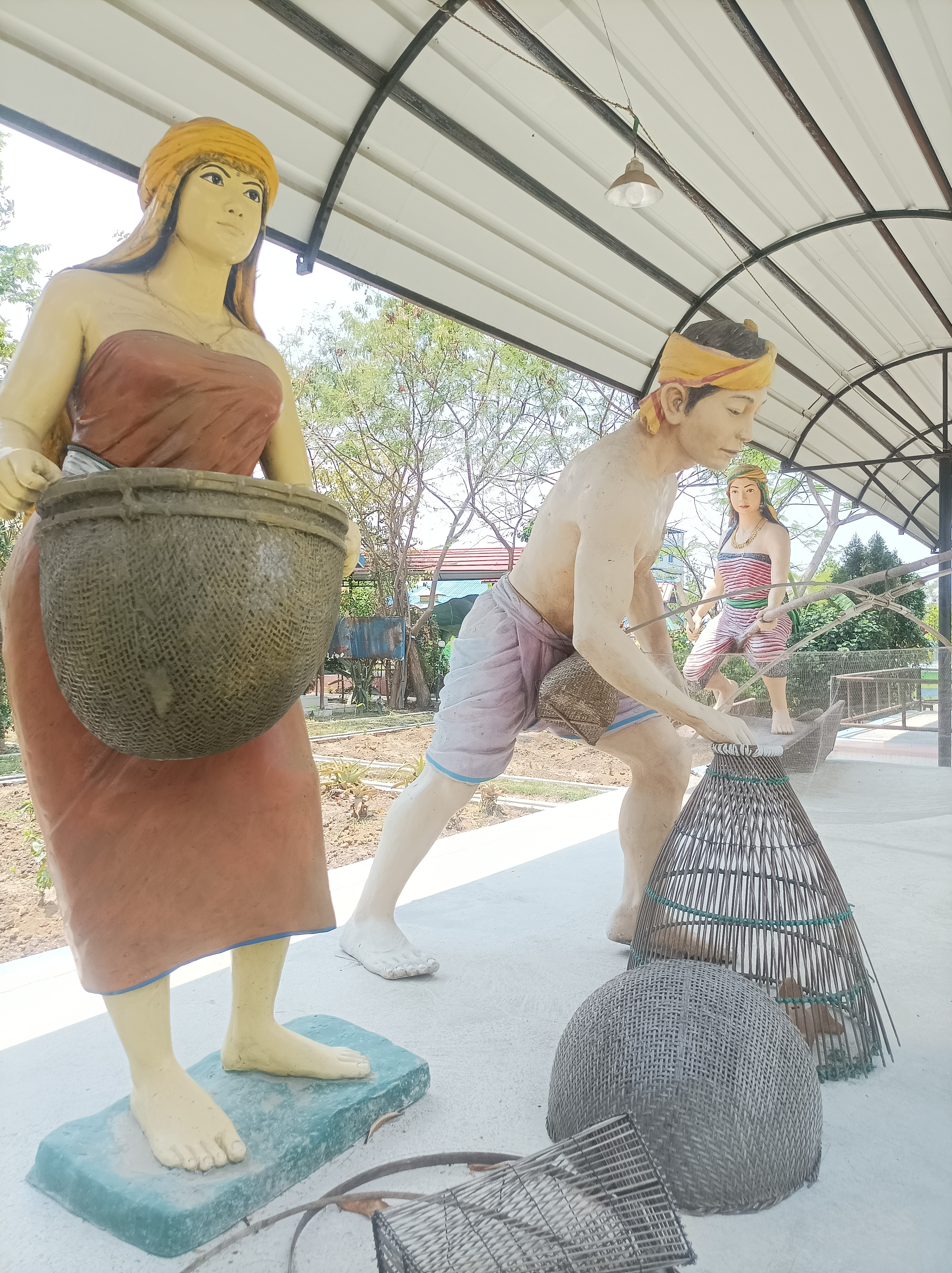
Classical Meitei sculptures of ancient Meitei fishermen using different indigenous Meitei fishing instruments & tools to catch fish

Fishing (Meitei: nga phaba) is one of the Meitei intangible cultural heritage of Manipur and other Meitei populated areas of Assam, Tripura as well as of Bangladesh and Myanmar. Meitei people (also known as Manipuris) fish in lakes, rivers, swamps, and marshy areas. Fishing is an important part of their daily life. They use many traditional fishing methods that develop over time.

== History ==
The Ancient Meitei language text Panthoipi Khongkul describes fishing activities in Manipur before the reign of Nongda Lairel Pakhangba (c. 33 CE). It mentions women catching fish using Nupee-Il and Long at a place called Turel Langmeipung. One day, Panthoibi, a girl from the Mangang clan, used Nupee-Il to fish. She also used a tool called Tunggol to store the fish she caught. Another old text, Moirang Shai-On Taret, talks about fishing in those times. It tells of a feast organized with permission from the King of Moirang. This feast followed a traditional game played between maidens led by Yaithing Konu, a noble’s daughter, and married women led by Nganbi. For the feast, women caught fish in Loktak Lake using their tools. Some women fished in shallow waters with Long, while others fished from boats using Nupee-Il. Operating Nupee-Il while standing on boats is a special skill of valley women in Manipur and is still practiced today. In early times, people also fished by building fishing weirs and using traps. Old texts mention that kings constructed royal fishing weirs and appointed fishery officers to manage fishing grounds. Nongban Kadem, from the Angom clan, served King Ura Konthouba (c. 568 CE) and built fishing weirs and traps. In ancient Manipur, different groups of people lived in various areas. Each group tried to control important fishing places, which often led to conflicts over fishing rights in rivers and streams.

=== Meitei Kings and Fishing ===
In the past, Meitei kings collected fish as taxes from lakes and fishing areas they owned. Fish was an important food for Meitei people. The kings likely built fishing areas, canals, and cleaned swamps to catch more fish. Organizing fishing was important to keep the Kingdom’s economy strong.

=== Fishing during Luwang Chief Shapaiba's time ===
During Luwang Chief Shapaiba's rule, Lamphel Shoy Weir was built to catch fish and trap animals. He also created two areas to farm Ngaroi fish (Crossocheilus burmanicus hora). Mkubi Shoy was made for fishing under the guidance of Luwang Salai Hanba. Nambul Shoy was given as a gift to Yumburembi of Kanglei when she married Thangyi Ningthouba of Luwang. Their oldest son, Pathang Ahanba, managed it.

- Aka Shoy was fishing in the rainy season when many fish were caught.
- Akum Shoy was fishing in the dry season, catching special fish like Ngashep (Mysrus bleekeri).

Later, the youngest son, Naoremton, managed Nambul Shoy because his mother wanted him to. The weir had many names like Lumpu Shoy, Hekap Shoy, Hesgotpan Ngashep Leikang-Ee, Akum Lairak-Ee, and Lanloi Chingareng Khamla Loukhnong Shoy.

=== Fishing and canals in the past ===
At Kanglei Wakhei Kon near Heipok River, there was a weir (Shoy) owned by Theba Nahakpa. The Kanglei chief controlled this weir and allowed women from the Heirem-Khunjam clan to fish in the river. A person named Heirem Khunchem built a dike (Pn) across a canal leading to a lake called Konte Pat. He made a fishing weir using bamboo pieces (Kharai). Another weir made of metal was owned by a young man named Thingkonpa from Heirem. The chief of Heirem built the Heirem Nongyai Khong canal, also known as Ngakha Khong (Puntius puntio), mainly for fishing. This canal was specially designed so fish could grow well. It was not very deep—when cows, pigs, or dogs crossed it, their bodies barely touched the water. During Chief Puriklai's rule, a fishing weir was built at Ungamel, where the Khuga and Manipur Rivers meet. It was made to catch many fish. Chief Puriklai also created Moirang Nongkangkhong at Khoiritak to trap animals and built the Laphu Khumtam Shoy canal for fishing. Chief Yoirel Tompokpa created Khuyon Penba Shoy to catch Pengba Fish (Osteobrama belangeri) and also for water transport. Sanathoibi Shoy was located between the Khuman and Heirem Khuncham clan areas and owned by Kege Moirang Leima Angom Ningol Sanathoibi. Queen Meitei Leima Koubaron Taipongambi worked with her husband, King Khagemba, to make fishing easier. She built a fishing canal called Leima Taipombi Lemlei Ngayok Khong to catch fish like Penba and Ngawa whenever needed.

== Implements and tools ==
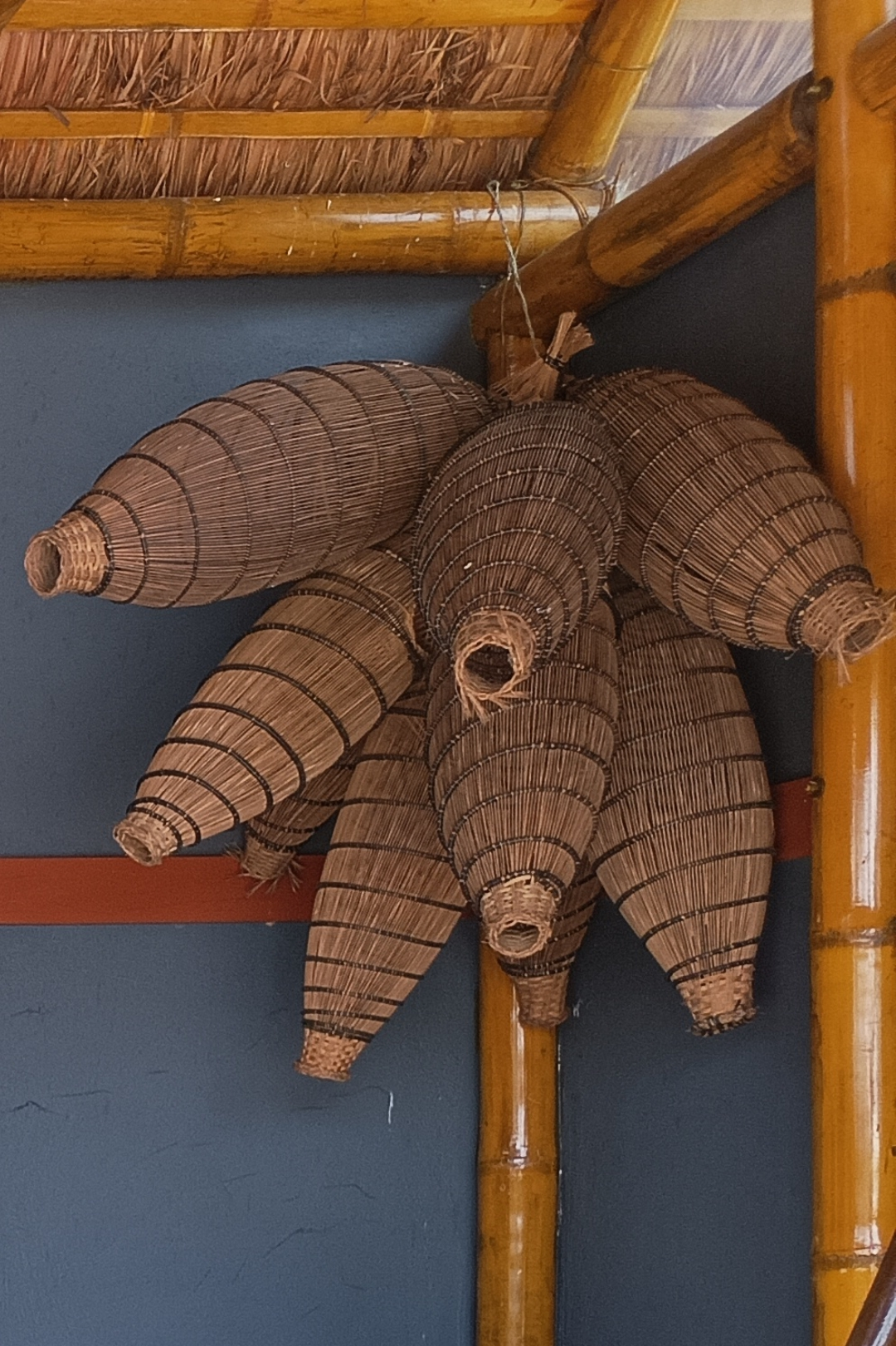
Meitei traditional fishing equipments, instruments or tools, hung in a wall

Meitei traditional fishing tools include long nets like Long gil and il, as well as scoop baskets such as Long-Khonba and Phum-Thaba. They also used scoop nets, box traps like Taijep-Lu and Kabo-Lu, and conical traps like Shouraru. Fishing lines of different lengths were employed, such as long lines (Khoishang-Thaba) and short lines (Khoi-Chopa, Khoiya-Thaba, Khoitek Thaba). Additionally, lift nets like Nupi-Il, gill nets like Lang-Thaba, and dip nets like Iljao-Thaba were commonly used.

In Manipur, Meitei traditional fishing tools are made from materials that are cheap, light, and easy to find. These tools are designed so women can use them easily. Both men and women can use most of these tools.

- Longthrai: This is a scoop net made of nylon. It has a round bamboo frame and a bamboo handle. The net has a wide, round opening and becomes narrow at the end. It is used in shallow water like small streams.
- Longoop: This is a bell-shaped fish trap. Both men and women use it. It is made from bamboo strips and has a small opening at the top and a wide bottom. It works in shallow, muddy water to catch fish.
- Kabow Loom: This is a fish trap that works with or without bait. It has narrow ends and a wide middle part with a valve to stop fish from getting out. It catches catfish and other live fish. One end of the trap is closed, and the other end is open with a removable cover. Fish can be taken out through the open end.
- Nupee Een: This fishing tool is made especially for women. Many people in Manipur use it. It has two bamboo sticks, 10 to 12 feet long, tied together in the middle. A net with small holes (0.5 cm) is attached to the four corners of the sticks. The bamboo sticks bend into a curve. A bamboo stick called a Poura is fixed in the middle and works like a lever to lift the net. A rope is tied to this stick to pull up the net.
- Long-Thiba (Spike Fishing): This tool has 7–9 small bamboo sticks polished at the tips with tin. These sticks are attached to a 10-foot-long bamboo pole using cane strips. It is used by men to fish during the dry season. Sometimes, it is also used for protection against snakes and wild animals in the fishing areas of lakes.

=== Fishing Traps ===
==== Taijeps / Bamboo Basket / Box Trap ====
The Taijeps is a rectangular fishing trap made from seasoned bamboo splits tied together with polythene straps. It is used in lakes and ponds, set among weeds in rows. The trap has an open mouth on one side, with non-return valves fixed inside the mouth that point inward to prevent fish from escaping. Three-fourths of the traps are usually set in rows, facing different directions depending on the fisherman’s preference. Traditional fishermen follow specific rules when using traps, as described by Bira Singh:

- Gillnets must not be placed in front of box traps.
- Surrounding nets or gillnets cannot enclose other fishing gear set by fellow fishermen.
- Fish already hooked and trapped in a box cannot be taken by nearby fishermen using the same gear.
- Each trap must have an identification mark, called “looyek,” to identify the owner.

==== Kabo-Lu / Tubular Trap ====
This trap has valves at both ends and a larger opening in the middle, which tapers towards both ends. It is made of bamboo splits, and the openings are designed so that fish, once inside, cannot escape. The trap is secured with cane or polythene straps. It is typically placed in areas with thick aquatic weeds or in water channels and outlets from ponds. This trap is mainly used to catch catfish.

==== Sora-lu / Conical Trap ====
Sora-lu is the largest fishing trap used in Manipur. It is mainly used to catch small fish like air-breathing fish and weed fish. This trap is placed near river mouths and lakes with mild water currents. It is also used in paddy fields during the rainy season, between June and August. The trap has two parts: the larger part is conical and tapers to a circular end with detachable ropes tied at opposite sides, while the smaller part is tubular and tapers at the end. The conical part gathers fish, and the tubular part collects them. These two parts are joined by a detachable rope tied at the smaller part's opening. To operate, fishermen place the trap in a selected area and secure it with two poles at opposite sides. The circular end of the larger part is inserted into the smaller part to form a continuous trap. The rope is tied to a pole to prevent the trap from being moved by water currents. Fishing is usually done in the evening, and the trap is left overnight. Fish are harvested in the morning by detaching the smaller part of the trap. This method allows the trap to be reused throughout the day.

== Methods and techniques ==
Meiteis fishing methods and techniques involve fishing with long nets, spike fishing, and catching fish with scoop baskets. They also dug holes in canals and ponds for fishing and practiced encircle fishing with Phum Namba. Fishing weirs (Shoy) were constructed and used as part of their fishing methods.

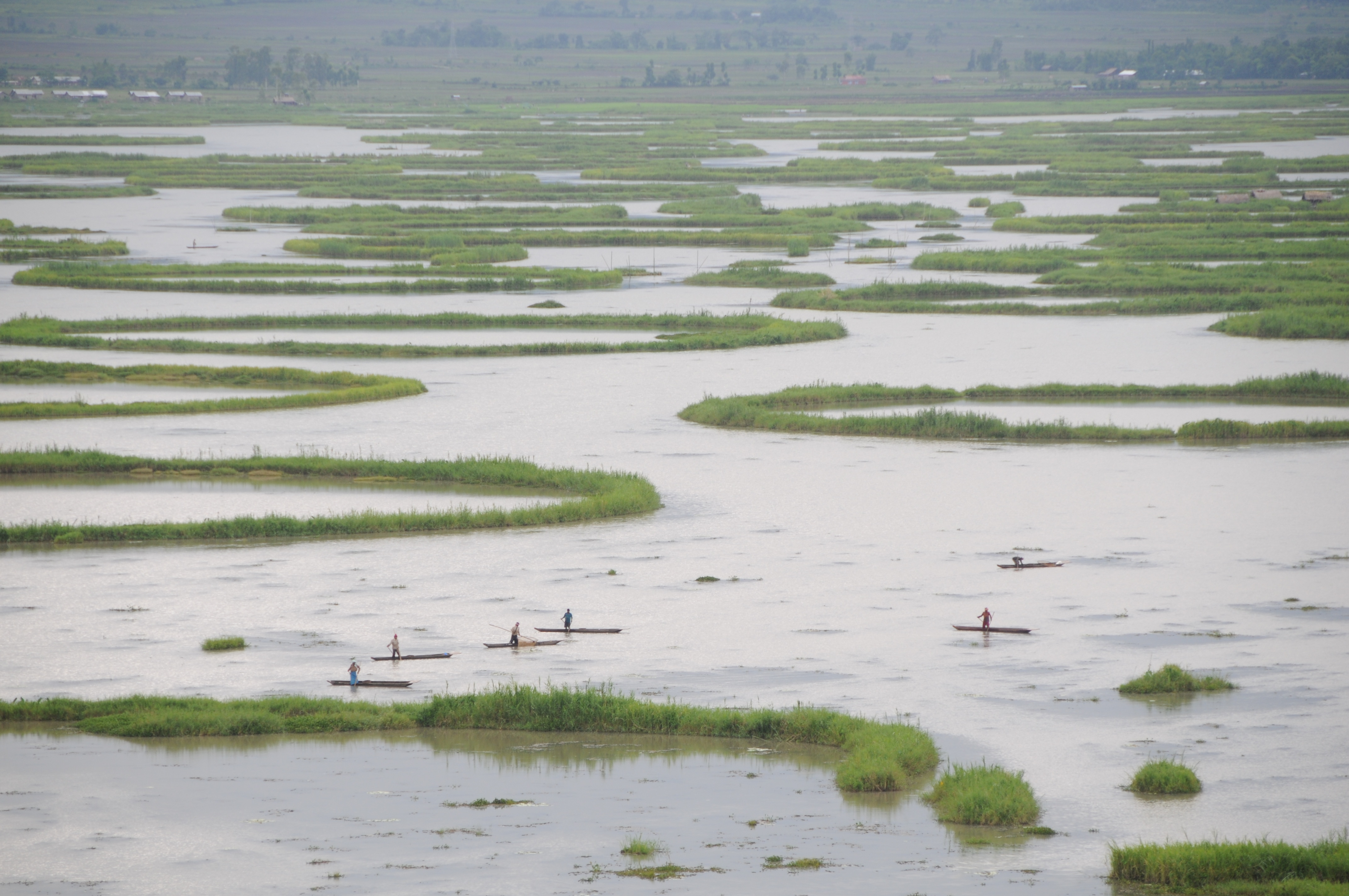
Fishing in the Loktak lake

=== Major fishing methods ===
==== Nupi-il / Lift Net ====
The word "Nupi" means woman, and "il" means net in Meitei language. This fishing tool is mostly used by women. The net is usually made of nylon, but in some areas, cotton is also used. It is built using two bamboo frames, each about 3 to 3.5 meters long. The frames are joined in the middle with cane strips to create four tips. Each tip of the net is fastened to the ends of the bamboo frames. A bamboo pole called "poura" supports the entire structure, acting as a fulcrum in the middle of the frames. A hauling rope, about 7 meters long, is used to lift the net. The net can be operated from the banks of lakes, rivers, ponds, or from boats. The fisherman inserts the bamboo pole (poura) into the dyke or uses their thighs for support when operating the net from a boat. Pressing down the pole lifts the net from the water, and the fish are collected by hand. This method is used all year round and can catch many types of fish, including Indian Major Carps, Puntius species, Chanda ranga, Chanda nama, Esomus dendricus, and air-breathing fish.

==== Il-jao / Dip Net ====
Il-jao means “big net” in Meitei language, with “il” meaning net and “jao” meaning big. This fishing tool is used between May and September in Loktak Lake. It is made by stitching 9–12 small dip nets together into a rectangular shape. The four corners of the net are tied to bamboo poles, which are further supported by another pole to keep the structure stable. The net is fixed to the bamboo poles using floating masses of vegetation (Phoomdis) in the lake. The net is left underwater for 4–5 hours or sometimes even a whole day. To attract fish, rice bran dough is spread over the net. When the net is hauled, two fishermen on boats lift it toward the Phoomdis. They untie the lower two ropes and gradually pull the net above the water's surface. Fish caught are collected by beating the net with smooth bamboo poles called “pou” to move them to the collection side.

==== Lang / Gill Net ====
Lang is a popular fishing gear used by fishermen. It is a single-wall net made of monofilament, with mesh sizes designed to catch specific fish. Fish are trapped by their gills in the net and cannot escape. The net is placed at the surface of ponds or lakes for a few hours. Fishermen haul it out either from the dyke or from a boat. In the study area, species-specific gill nets are common, and they are classified based on the type of fish caught. The five types are: Ngapai Lang (Chitala chitala gillnet); Ngarang Lang (Nangra viridecsens gillnet); Phabou Lang (Puntius gillnet); Ukabi lang (Anabas testudineus gillnet); and Lang jao (Big gillnet).

==== Khoisang Thakpa / Longline ====
Khoisang Thakpa means setting a longline on the water's surface. This fishing tool is mostly used during the summer season (June–August). It is made of nylon or cotton twine, 50–100 meters long, with 30–50 baited hooks attached at intervals of 2–3 meters along the line. The line is stretched across the water surface. For operation, one end of the line is tied to a fixed pole, and the rest of the line is secured to weeds along the way. The tail end is tied to another fixed pole. The longline is set early in the morning and left for 8–10 hours before being hauled. It can then be reset in a different area. The live bait commonly used includes Puntius species, insects, earthworms, Esomus dendricus, Amblypharyngodon mola, prawns, and sometimes small Channa species.

==== Moirang Lang / Encircling Net ====
This fishing method is similar to using a purse seine or setting up a gill net. It works well in large water bodies to catch groups of fish. To create the encircling net, 5–10 gill nets are joined together.

This gear is used when the water level is at its lowest, usually from November to June. Fishermen look for fish groups by observing the water's color and the movement of aquatic plants. Once the fish are spotted, the net is set up around the fish group to trap them. The fishermen drive the fish toward the net by striking the boat's edge or using a spear from inside the encircled area. The fish get caught in the net. The catch depends on the size of the net's mesh.

==== Moonamba / Drag Net ====
This fishing method is used during the dry season in beels, ponds, and lakes. Fish from shallow or almost dry areas are dragged out with this net. It is effective for catching different sizes of fish, from small to large.

Two fishermen are needed to use this gear. The net is dipped fully into the water and turned along with the current. When the fishermen feel fish getting caught in the net, they close the net mouth, lift it out of the water, and remove the fish. Fish species caught include Puntius sp., Anabas testudineus, Heteropneustes fossilis, Channa sp., Amblypharyngodon mola, Esomus dendricus, and air-breathing fish.

=== Minor fishing methods ===
==== Longthrai Fishing / Scoop Net ====
The scoop net, called Longthrai, comes in various shapes like cup, triangle, circular, or trapezoidal. It is made of nylon or mosquito net fixed to a bamboo or jute frame with a long handle. This gear is used from the dyke, boat, or near the pond or lake margins, especially in weed-filled areas. It is practiced all year round by men, women, and children and is considered the easiest way to catch fish. Fish species caught include minnows, prawn, Channa species, Anabas testudineus, and Clarias batrachus.

==== Long-Oop Fishing / Plunge Cover-Basket ====
The Long-Oop is a bell-shaped basket made of seasoned bamboo strips, about 50–55 cm tall, with a base diameter of 40–50 cm and a top opening of 13–15 cm. It is used during the dry season when water levels are low. One person operates it, plunging it into the water to trap fish. It is a common tool found in every fisherman’s house. Species caught include Indian major carps, exotic carps, Notopterus species, and Channa striatus.

==== Long Fishing / Spear ====
This method uses a spear with 5–9 prongs made of steel or bamboo tipped with iron. The spear is attached to a bamboo pole 3–4 meters long. Expert fishermen use it to catch fish by spotting bubbles or movements in the water. The spear is thrown from boats or dykes to catch fish. Species caught include Channa striatus, Labeo rohita, common carp, exotic carps, and Wallago attu.

==== Khoi Choppa / Pole Line ====
This fishing method is used by people of all ages, from children to older fishermen. It consists of a bamboo pole or split, about 1.5–2 meters long, or longer depending on the fishing area. A nylon or cotton thread, 2–3 meters long, is tied to the tip of the pole, with a baited hook at the end. A small float or stick, around 3–4 cm long, is attached to the middle of the thread to act as an indicator when a fish is caught. The float moves when a fish is hooked. For fishing in running water, a lead weight is attached to the thread about 10–15 cm above the hook to keep the line steady in the water. Baits such as earthworms, maida paste, hentak, or boiled rice paste are commonly used. Fish species caught with this method include Clarias batrachus, Channa striatus, Labeo rohita, and Monopterus cuchia.

=== Il Chingba ===
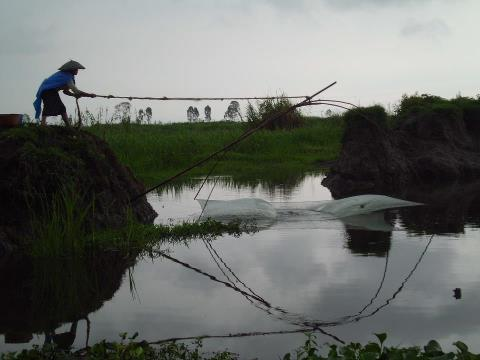
Een Chingba

This fishing method uses a tool called Nupee-Il, which is very popular in Manipur's valley. It is made by arranging two bamboo frames in an X shape, joined in the middle with a cane strip. The four tips of the frames are attached to the corners of a rectangular net. A bamboo pole supports the entire setup during use. Women usually perform this type of fishing. It can be done from the banks of ponds, rivers, lakes, or even from boats. Many types of fish can be caught with this method.

=== Long Khonba ===
This type of fishing is done only by the women of the Meitei community. After the monsoon season, groups of women go to waterlogged, swampy areas. They fish in shallow rivers, wetlands, marshes, and low-lying paddy fields. They use a tool called "Long," which is made from split bamboo woven into a half-elliptical basket. They also tie a bamboo basket called "Tongol" around their waists to hold the fish they catch. These traditional tools are light and easy for the women to use.

=== Loo Thumba (Setting Up the "Loo" Trap) ===
"Loo" is a traditional, cone-shaped fish trap made by splitting a large bamboo into thin rods, which are then tied together with cane threads. The trap has a wide opening that slowly narrows at the end. It is used to catch fish in rice fields or small streams. The trap is fixed in narrow channels along the edges (bunds) of the rice fields, and water carries the fish into it. People check and collect the fish every 2 to 3 hours. This trap is light, so both men and women can set it up.

=== Ishitpa ===
After the monsoon season, people fish in swampy, wet areas like rice fields. Families—with men, women, and children—join together for this activity. They build a small mud wall to split the area into two parts. Then, using a scoop called an Istop, they remove the water from one part. In the part with less water, the women catch fish by hand.

=== Kommenba ===
This method is used by the Meitei community in Thoubal district right after the rice harvest while the fields are still wet. The rice straw is spread around the field, leaving small patches of bare ground. Traditional fish traps called Taichep are set in these bare spots overnight. These traps are rectangular and have one open side with a one-way entrance. Fish enter the trap but cannot get out. As the oxygen level drops under the straw, fish move to the open areas and get trapped. Both men and women easily handle these small, lightweight traps.

=== Phum Namba ===
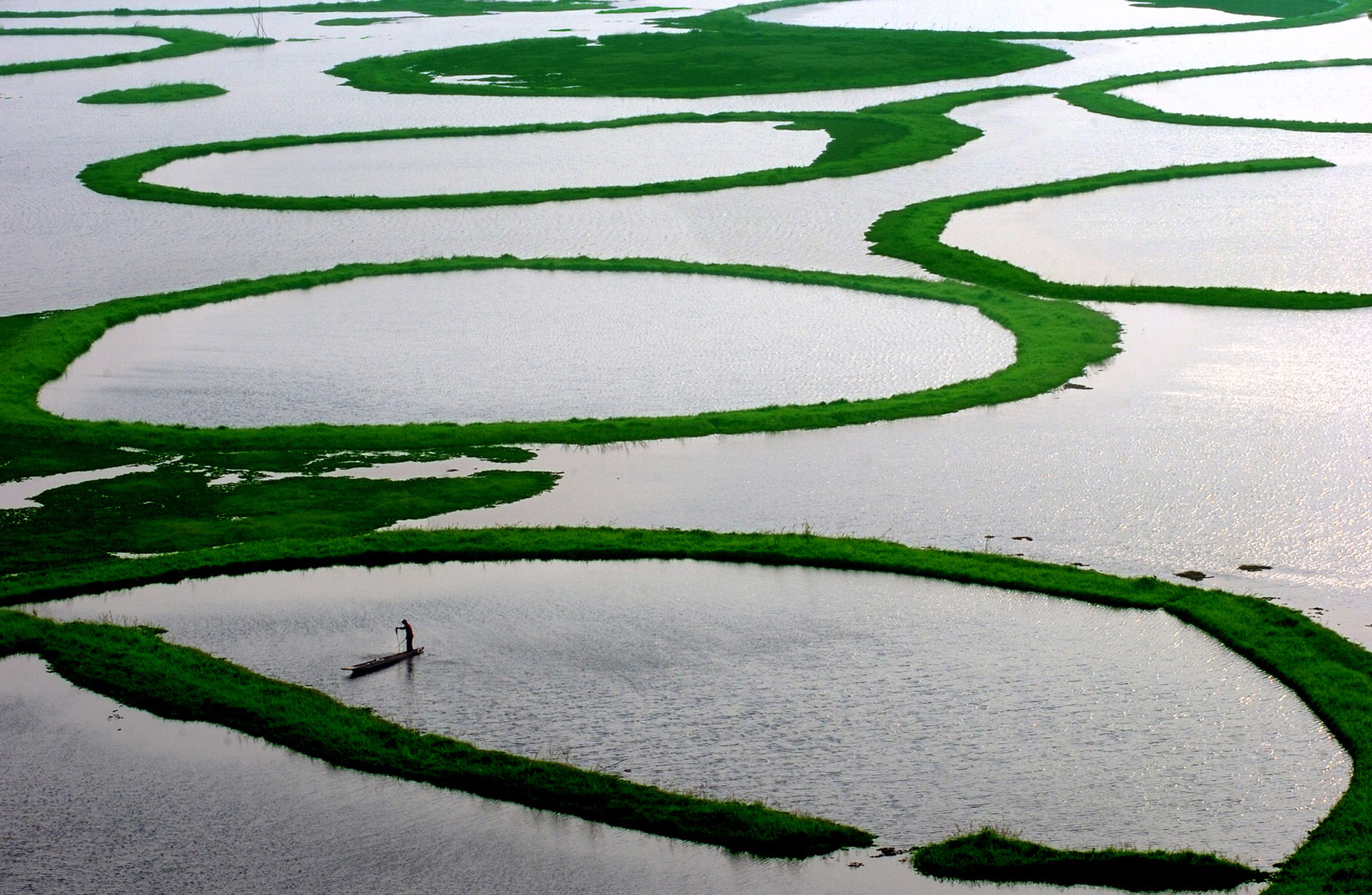
Fishing among the phumdi floating biomass in the Loktak lake

In Manipur’s wetlands, especially at Loktak Lake in Bishnupur district, people build floating mats called "phum." These mats are round or half-round and are made from weeds, water plants, and other natural materials. The mats last a few months. Sometimes villagers, including women, add extra nutrients like rice husk powder and other aquatic plants to the center of the phum. This helps to attract fish. During the lean season (usually from October to March), the villagers harvest the phum along with the fish that have gathered around them. This method is called Phum Namba.

=== Khoishang-Thaba (Long Line Fishing) ===
This is an important fishing method used by men throughout the year. It involves a long thread, 90–100 meters long, with multiple hooks tied to it at 2-meter intervals. Before starting, the fishing area of the lake is cleaned. The long line is operated from a boat, and one end of the thread is tied to a bamboo pole. The hooks are baited with lures, and the fishing is set in the evening. Fishermen collect the fish the next morning.

=== Khoiya and Khoitek-Thaba (Short Pole Line) ===
A 3-foot-long reed (Phragmites karka) is used, and a thread is tied to it. At the end of the thread, a bamboo piece called Kanam is attached and baited. This is the oldest form of short pole line fishing in Manipur, later renamed Khoitek. The bamboo piece is now replaced with a modern harpoon. This type of fishing is done early in the morning by men using boats.

=== Long-Oop Tanba ===
This method uses a bell-shaped fishing tool called Long-Oop, which is operated by men. The bottom of this tool is very wide, with a small opening at the top to remove the caught fish. It is used in waist-deep water, where the operator slowly wades and plunges it into the water. This tool is good for catching medium to large fish.

=== Phoom Chingba ===
In this method, floating vegetation called Phoom is cut and pulled out of the water. A large sickle with a long bamboo handle, known as Phoomlen Thanggol, is used for this. The vegetation is cut into pieces, pulled to the bank, and the fish hiding inside are collected by hand. One to three people are needed for this method.

=== Khut Humba ===
This is the simplest fishing method, done without any tools. It is carried out in various water bodies like ponds, canals, rivers, flooded fields, swamps, and marshy areas. Fish are caught using only bare hands.

== Fishing in agricultural fields ==
The Meiteis have been fishing in agricultural fields since farming began in Manipur. Farmers fished in their own fields when the fields had enough water for growing rice. This method of fishing was popular in many farming areas of the valley. Farmers used homemade nets and "lu" (rectangular fishing tools made of bamboo, cane, or plastic strips) to catch fish.

== Fishing during the off-season ==
During the off-season, water from lakes, swamps, and marshes was drained through canals and streams to make the land ready for farming and settlements. Low dikes (called Pn) were built across rivers and streams using clay, wood, and bamboo. When water flowed back through the canals, people used large and small cone-shaped fishing tools made from bamboo and cane (called Shouraru) to catch many kinds of fish. This method of fishing was called Shoychaba, and it was managed by people who took care of the fishing areas (Shoy). The fishing system had two types:

- Akashoy: Fishing during the rainy season when the water level was high.
- Akumshoy: Fishing during the winter season when the water level was low.

Some of the important canals (Khongs) made by the state were Nongmaikhong, Ungamel Marin, Nganan Marin, Komnakhong, Phabakchao Khongjin, Shamushang, Maramba Marine, Nahakhong, and Mahrani Khong. Fishing weirs (Shoy) were built in these canals. There were also streams like Irumbi Stream of Naransena, Moirang River, Yangoi River, and Langkambi Marin that were managed by Shoychaba for fishing. With the introduction of the Patchaba system (Pat = lake, Chaba = person who looks after the protected lake), some lakes were made into protected fishing areas.

== In mythology and folklore ==
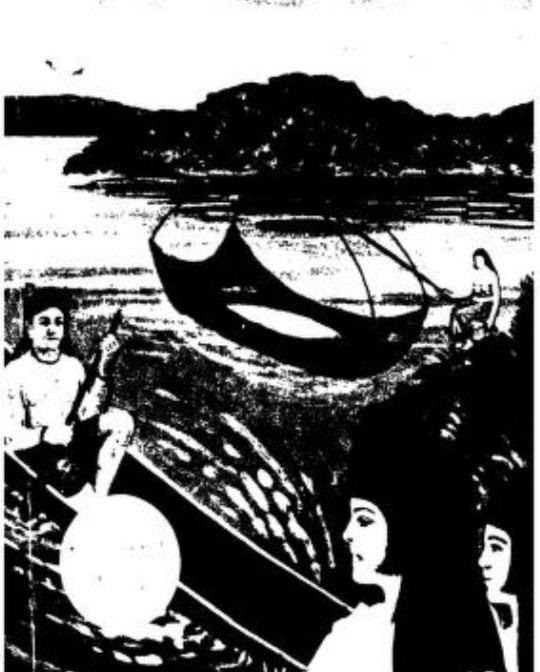
Princess Thoibi fishing in the Loktak lake, while Khuman Khamba came and unintentionally met her

=== Loktak Ima ===
Loktak Ima or Loktak Lairembi, a mother goddess, is believed to be the one who takes care of the fish in Loktak Lake. According to traditional Meitei beliefs, she is responsible for making sure that the fish population is always restored. Even if people catch a lot of fish from the lake, the fish never disappear completely. The goddess ensures that the fish population continues to grow and remain healthy. She is greatly respected and honored by the fishermen communities of the Meitei ethnicity. These communities live in and around the areas surrounding Loktak Lake, and they hold the goddess in high regard for her role in protecting and maintaining the fish population in the lake.

=== Khamba Thoibi ===
Fishing in Loktak Lake serves as the central theme in the classical Meitei epic narrative of the Khamba Thoibi. Princess Thoibi invited Khamnu to fish with her in the lake as part of a celebratory gathering of women. The King issued strict orders prohibiting men from entering the lake during the event. Khamnu informed her brother Khamba about the prohibition and left him at home. During his sleep, Khamba dreamed of Goddess Panthoibi, who appeared in Khamnu's guise and urged him to prepare vegetables. Upon waking, Khamba reflected on the dream, and God Thangjing assured him it was genuine. Khamba proceeded to the lake, boarded a boat, and rowed in the wrong direction, prompting Thangjing to shroud the hills with clouds. A storm redirected Khamba's boat to the area where Thoibi and the women were fishing. Thoibi noticed Khamba nearby and questioned Khamnu about the man who had defied the King's orders. Khamnu denied knowing him. As Khamba approached, Thoibi admired his well-crafted appearance, and Khamba was equally captivated by Thoibi's beauty. The divine will of God orchestrated their encounter, leading to mutual love.

=== Khuyol Haoba and Yaithing Konu ===
During a festive occasion in Moirang, all the unmarried women gathered at Loktak Lake for fishing, while men were prohibited from entering the waters. Lady Yaithing Konu's fishing net's wooden frame broke, causing her distress as only men could fix it. Khuyol Haoba, hiding nearby, emerged to assist in repairing the net. The encounter led to their falling in love at first sight.

=== Sandrembi Chaisra ===
In the Meitei story of Sandrembi Chaisra, two widows made their living by selling vegetables in the market and fishing at Shilempat (Shilem Lake). Sangkhuleima, the younger widow, often tried to harm Yangkhuleima, the elder widow. One day, while fishing at the lake, Yangkhuleima caught many types of fish, whereas Sangkhuleima only caught snakes and reptiles but no fish at all.

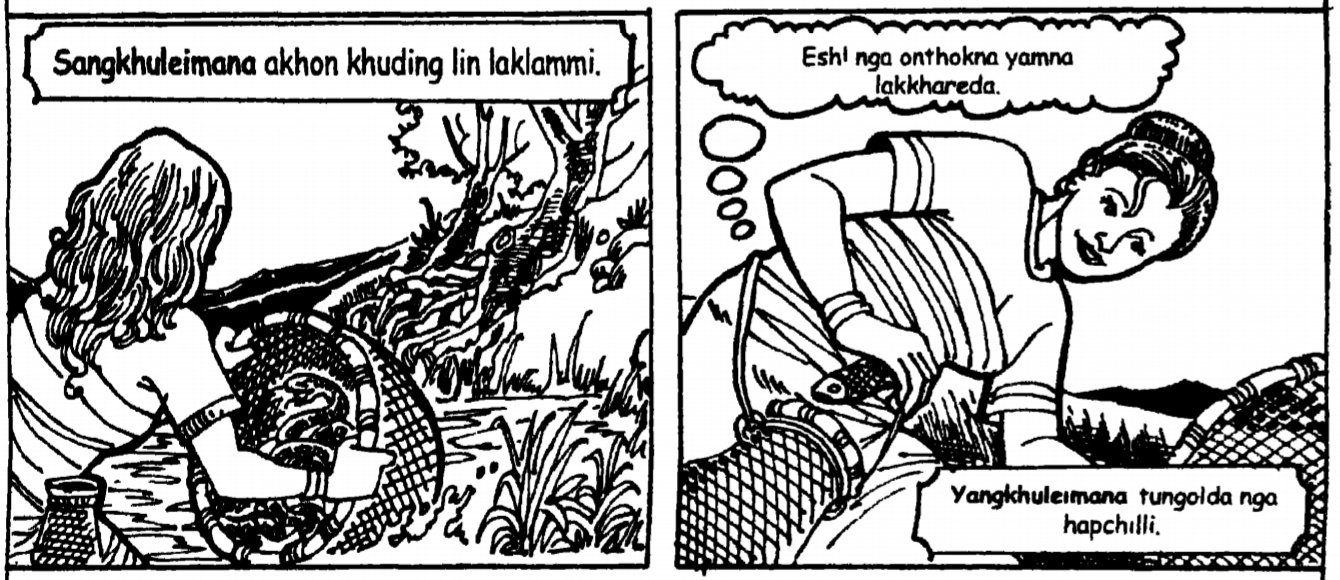
Co-wives catching fish and other creatures in the Meitei folktale of Sandrembi Chaisra

== In popular culture ==
- Loktak Lairembee (film), a Meitei documentary movie

== Gallery ==
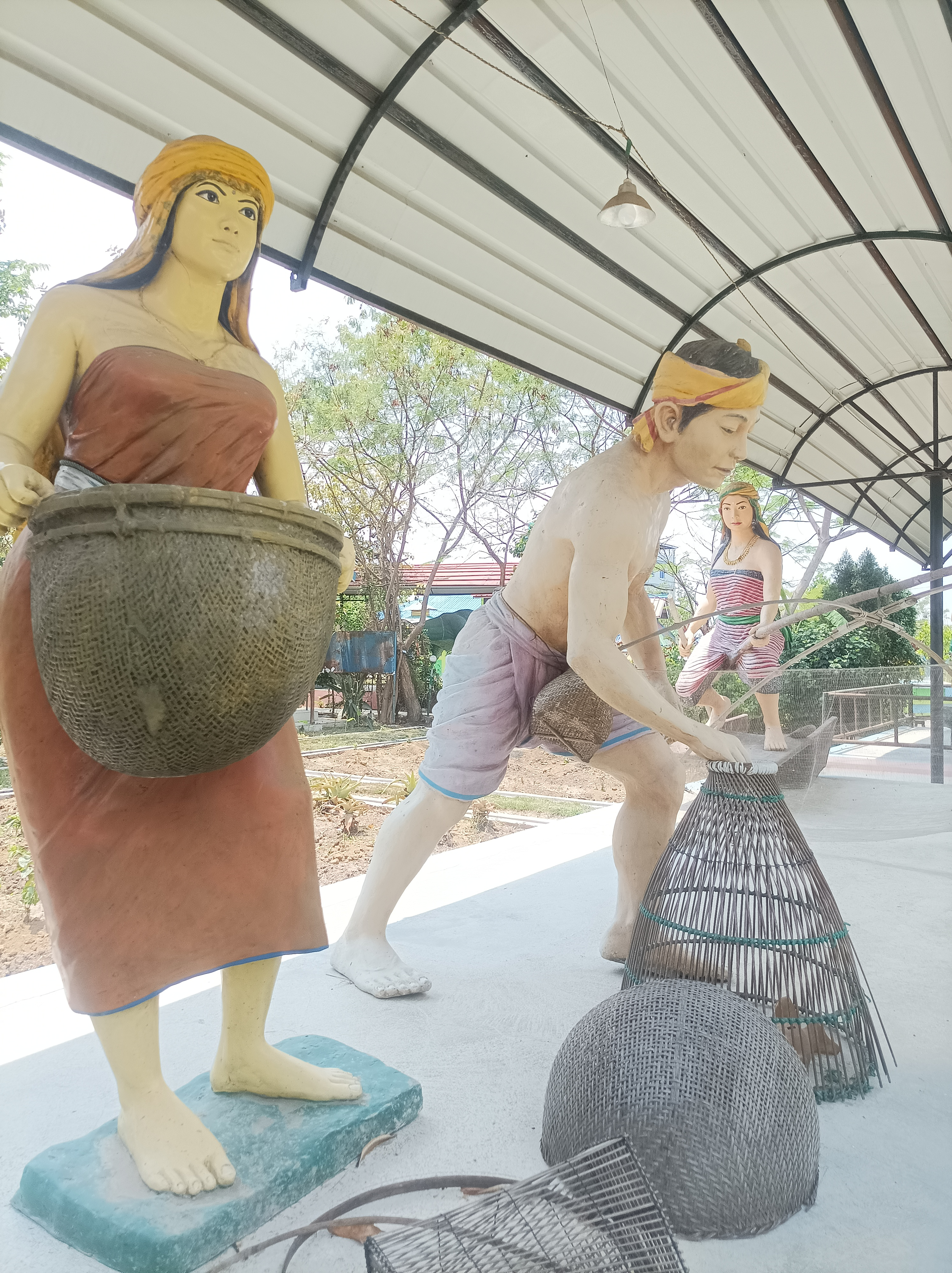

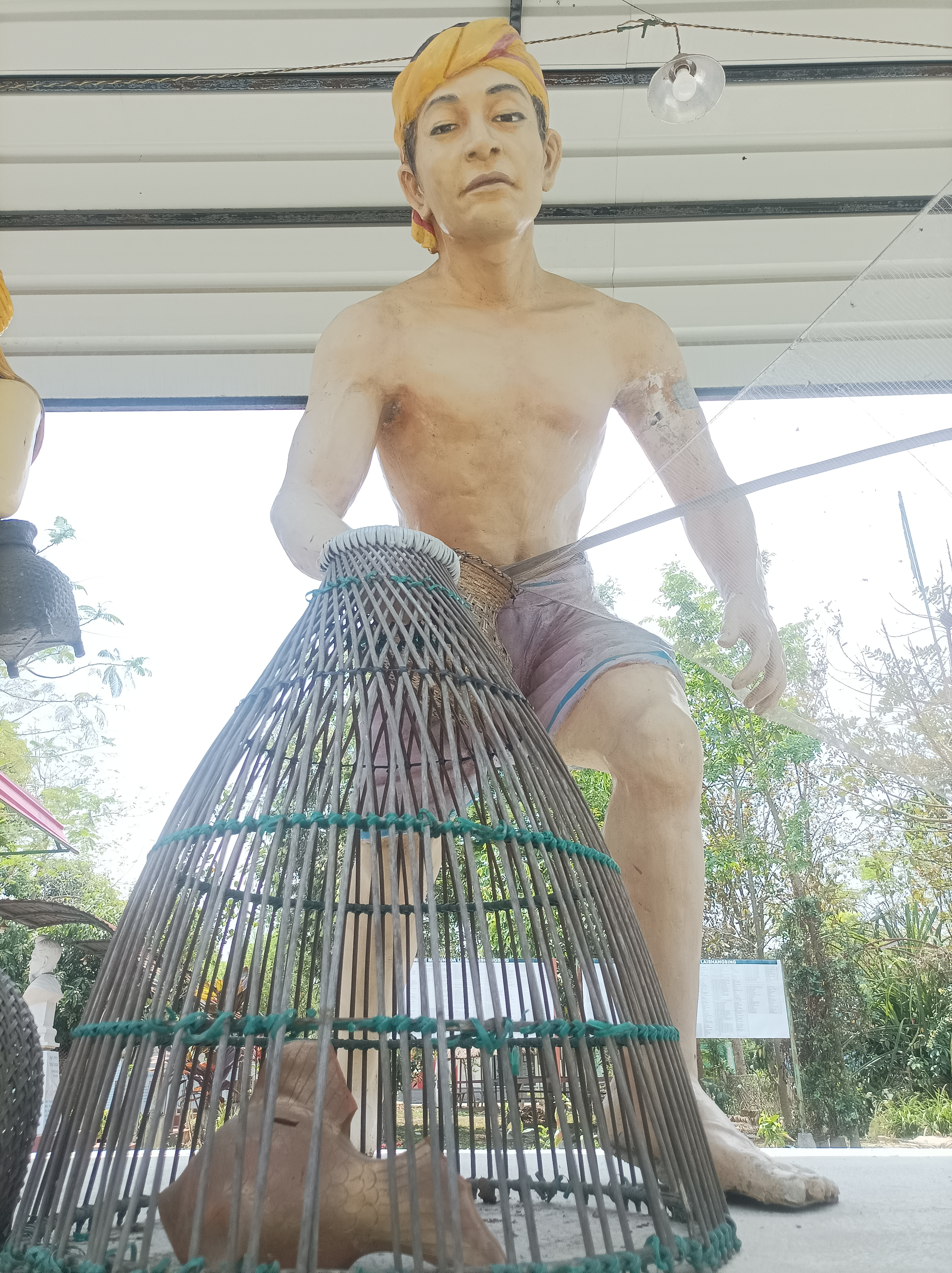

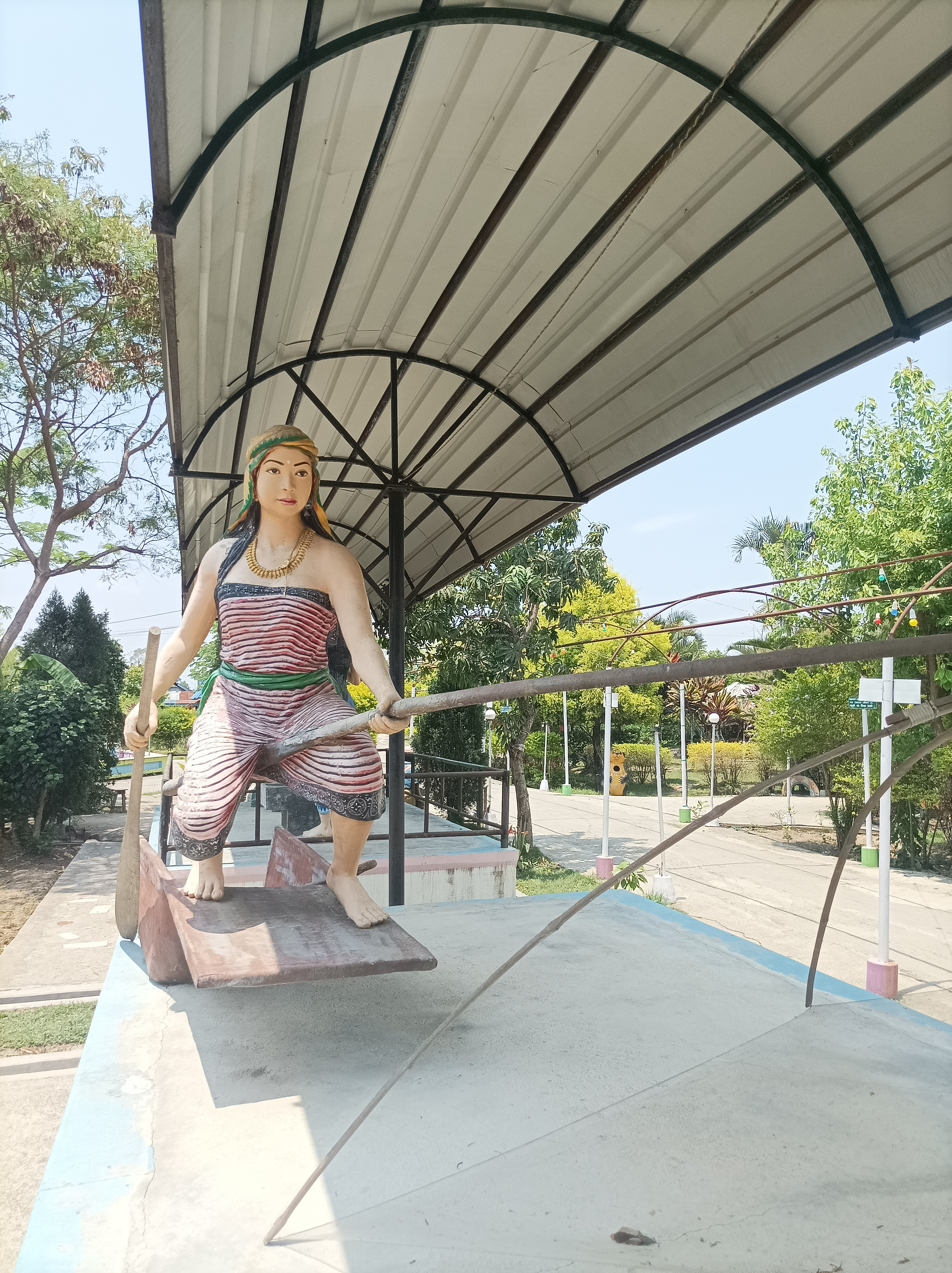

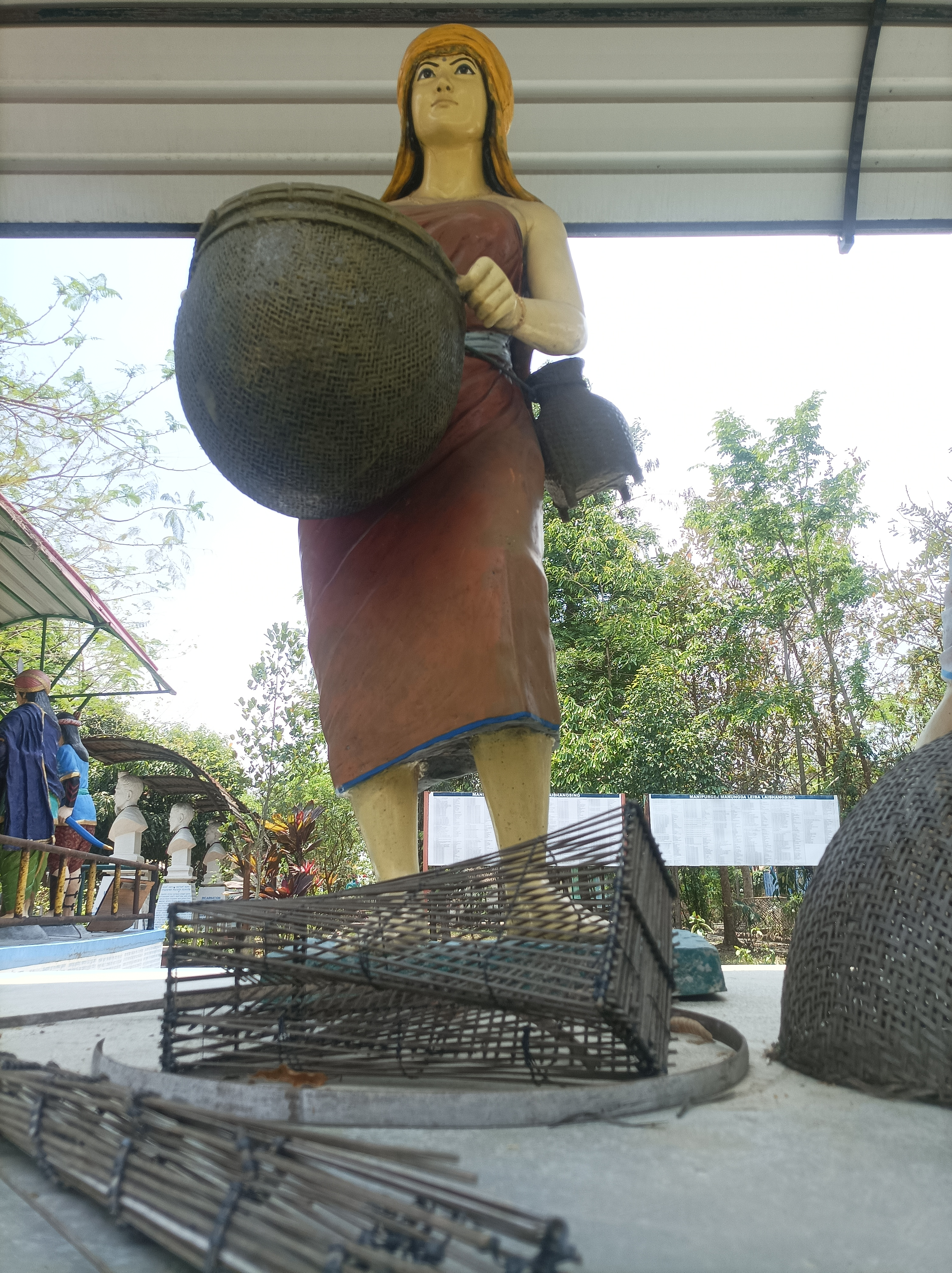

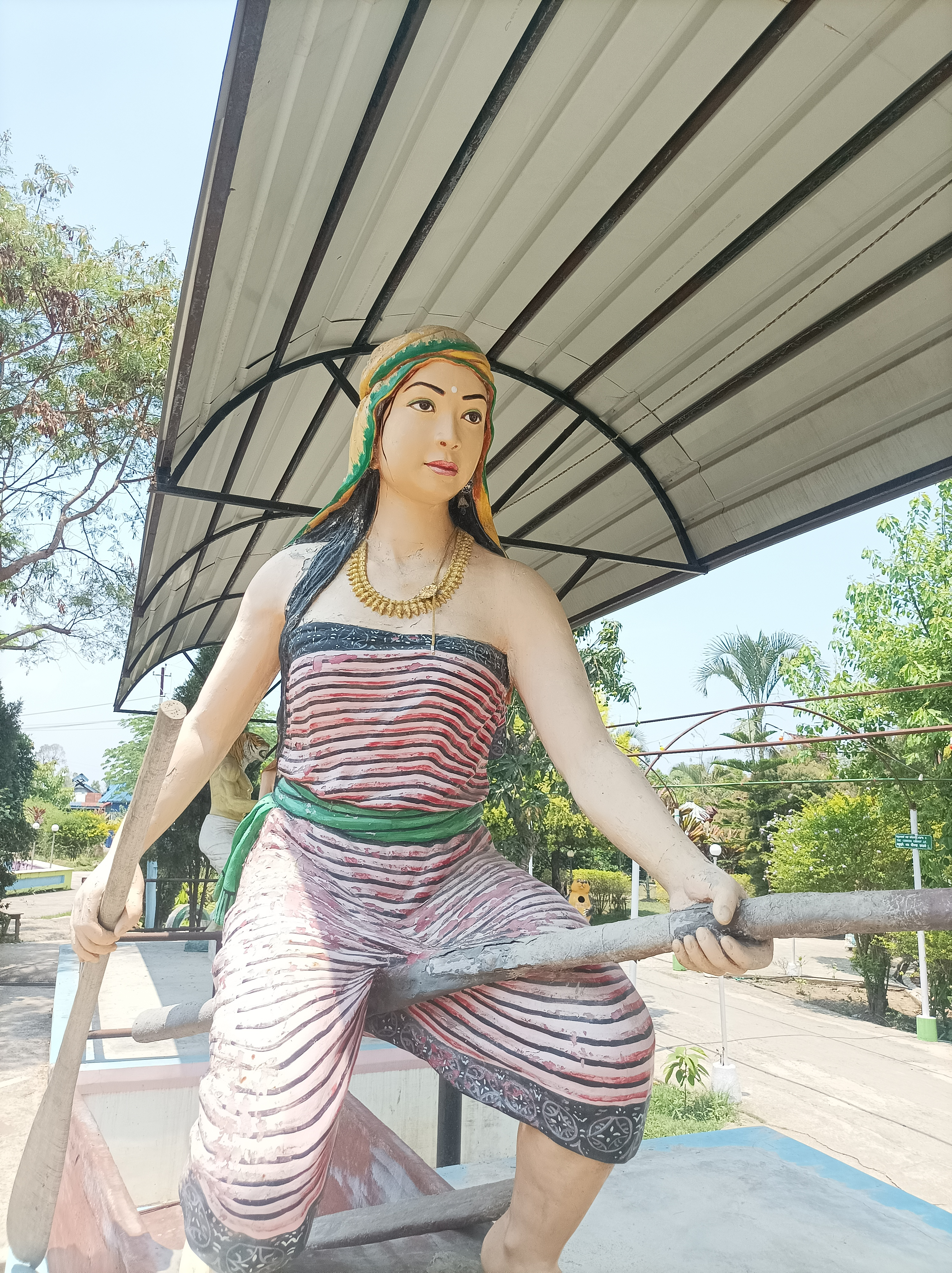

== See also ==
- Loktak Folklore Museum
- Women in Meitei civilization
- Plants in Meitei culture
- Lai Haraoba
- Meitei martial arts
- Meitei traditional games
- Meitei traditional toys
- Meitei traditional weapons
- Fishing in India
- Fishing industry in Bangladesh
- Fishing in Myanmar
