= Wanglen Pungdingheiba and Sappa Chanu Silheibi =

Ancient Meitei historical tale

The story of Wanglen Pungdingheiba and Sappa Chanu Silheibi

Folk tale
- Name: The story of Wanglen Pungdingheiba and Sappa Chanu Silheibi
- Aarne–Thompson grouping: no
- Mythology: Meitei mythology
- Country: Ancient Kangleipak (historical); India (present)
- Region: Moirang, Manipur
- Origin Date: during the reign of King Iwang Puriklai Ura Khongyamba (533-574 AD)
- Related: Meitei folklore

The ancient legend of Wanglen Pungdingheiba and Sappa Chanu Silheibi is one of the tales of incarnations described in the Moirang Shayon. Moirang was an independent kingdom, but later became a province of Manipur. It concerns the tragi-comic romantic adventures of Wanglen Pungdingheiba for his ladylove Sappa Chanu Silheibi). Wanglen Pungdingheiba was a skilled craftsman known for making musical instrument pung. Lady Sappa Chanu Silheibi was a skilful weaving artisan. Both the lovers are equally noted for their talents and good looks, thereby becoming the matters of envy of many young men and women in the kingdom of Moirang.

== History ==
Wanglen Pungdingheiba and Sappa Chanu Silheibi were real historical figures who lived during the reign of King Iwang Puriklai Ura Khongyamba (533-574 AD) of Moirang.

== Tragedy ==
One day, Wanglen Pungdingheiba and Sappa Chanu Silheibi decided to compete each other for a challenge to complete preparing their respective talented crafts faster than each other. So, Wanglen Pungdingheiba was crafting a pung. And Sappa Chanu Silheibi was weaving a decorative garment. In fact, Pungdingheiba completed his work first, thus getting faster than Sappa Chanu Silheibi. Getting curious about Silheibi's pace of work, Pungdingheiba decided to go and have a look for her. So, he went to the house of his sweetheart to see her efficiency. During his absence, in Pungdingheiba's house, one of his friends visited him. His friend didn't find him. While searching for him, his friend got to see the musical instrument crafted by Pungdingheiba. His friend was unaware of the ongoing contest between Pungdingheiba and Silheibi. Getting interested in the instrument, the friend started playing the pung for examining the qualities of the apparatus. While doing so, he played it with his full strength to produce the best sounds as much as he could. The loudest sounds produced by the instrument reached the house of Silheibi, who heard the music. During the competition, as the instrument was played to produce the loudest possible sounds, Silheibi assumed that Pungdingheiba is humiliating her. She fell embarrassed. Accepting the defeat and getting awkward at the actions of her lover (as she assumed wrongly) for a simple contest, she valued prestige more than love, thus committing suicide by thrusting a knife to herself. After a few moments, Pungdingheiba came to her place and found the blood bathed dead body of Sappa Chanu Silheibi, beside her handloom. He found his existence in the world meaningless with the absence of his true heart. Getting shocked, he decided to follow the path of his lover in the similar way.

== See also ==
- Akongjamba and Phouoibi
- Henjunaha and Lairoulembi
- Kadeng Thangjahanba and Tonu Laijinglembi
- Khamba and Thoibi
- Khuyol Haoba and Yaithing Konu
- Ura Naha Khongjomba and Pidonnu
