= Kaoba Hingamba =

Kaoba Hingamba (ꯀꯥꯎꯕ ꯍꯤꯡꯉꯝꯕ), shortly known as Kaoba (ꯀꯥꯎꯕ) or Kaopa (ꯀꯥꯎꯄ), was a warrior from the Khuman kingdom, neighboring to the ancient kingdom of Moirang. He is known for his role in the traditional story of Khuyol Haoba and Yaithingkonu. His actions, especially those driven by anger and pride, played a major part in the turning point of the lovers’ tale.

Khuman Kangleiron, the royal chronicle of the Khuman dynasty, mentions Kaoba and Yaithing Konu, as the king and the queen of the Khuman kingdom.

Kaoba Hingamba is remembered not only for his strength and position as a Khuman warrior but also for his role in separating the lovers. His actions were influenced by pride, anger, and a sense of justice as he saw it. He remains a key figure in the traditional narrative of Moirang Kangleirol, the ancient legends of Moirang, as well as Khuman Kangleiron of the Khuman kingdom.

== Role ==
Kaoba Hingamba encountered Luwang Huiningsumba, a nobleman and the father of Yaithingkonu, when the former's property was damaged by the latter. Huiningsumba went to a hunting expedition ordered by the king of Moirang but could not find any animal. In an effort to flush out game, the Luwang nobleman set fire to bushes in the forest. The fire quickly spread and became uncontrollable.

The fire extended into the Khuman kingdom and burned down the house and barn of Kaoba Hingamba. Furious at the destruction of his property, Kaoba captured Huiningsumba and his men. He refused to release them unless he was paid a rich ransom.

== Demands and marriage ==
Kaoba demanded that Huiningsumba give him his daughter, Yaithingkonu, in exchange for the safety of himself and his men. The Moirang authorities agreed to the demand to avoid further conflict. A grand marriage was arranged, and Yaithingkonu was sent to Kaoba Hingamba's house, even though she was already pregnant with Khuyol Haoba's child.

== Discovery and final outcome ==
Khuyol Haoba continued to secretly visit Yaithingkonu in disguise. However, Kaoba eventually discovered these meetings. In anger, he drove Yaithingkonu out of his home. This led to the final reunion of the two lovers, Haoba and Konu.

== See also ==
- Khuman warrior traditions
- Meitei martial arts
- Meitei traditional weapons
- Khuman kingdom
- Moirang kingdom
- Khuman dynasty
- Khuman Apokpa
- List of Khuman kings
- List of Khuman queens
- Khuman royal necklace incident
- Khuman Kangleirol
- Moirang Kangleirol
- Khuman Puremba
- Khuman Khamba
- Khumanlol
- Khuman language
- Khuman Kwakpa Litonpanba
- Maithingkongaba
- Thongbu Wainucha
- Chakha Moiremba
- Haoba Athouba
- Haokhong Sinaikhu
- Kangchin
- Khuman Tongbu
