= Luwang Huiningsumba =

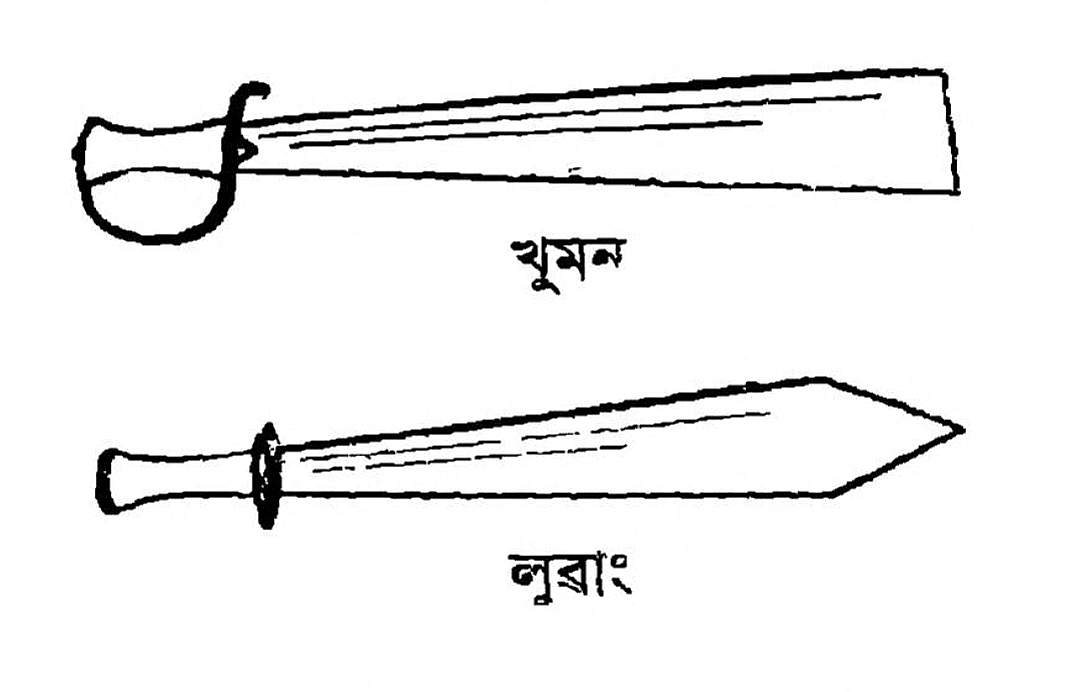
Sacred and holy clan dynastic swords of the Khumans and the Luwangs (notable for the interaction between Luwang Huiningsumba and Khuman Kaoba Hingamba)

Luwang Huiningsumba (Note: written in traditional Meitei Mayek script as ꯂꯨꯋꯥꯡ ꯍꯨꯏꯅꯤꯡꯁꯨꯝꯕ.) or Luwang Huiningshumba was a mythical nobleman in the traditional narrative from ancient kingdom of Moirang. He belonged to the Luwang clan. He was the father of Yaithingkonu.

== Status and family ==
Luwang Huiningsumba was a member of the Luwang clan. He held a ministerial position in the royal court of Moirang kingdom. His daughter, Yaithingkonu, became the lover of Khuyol Haoba, an orphan from Moirang.

== Hunting expedition ==
Once Huiningsumba was sent by the Moirang king on a hunting expedition. However, he was unable to find any wild animals. To drive animals out of hiding in the forest, he ordered his men that the surrounding bushes be burned. This decision led to a serious and unexpected disaster.

=== Conflict with Kaoba Hingamba ===
The fire in the forest quickly spread beyond control and reached the Khuman kingdom. It destroyed the home and barn of Kaoba Hingamba, a Khuman warrior. The Khuman warrior was very angry at the destruction of his property. Huiningsumba and his men were captured by the Khuman warrior.

Huiningsumba was demanded a huge ransom in return for his release. He was asked to give his daughter Yaithingkonu hand in marriage, as a compensation. To save his life and the lives of his men, Huiningsumba had no choice but to agree to the demands of the Khuman warrior. A formal marriage was arranged between Kaoba Hingamba and Yaithingkonu. Yaithingkonu, despite already being in relationship with Khuyol Haoba, was forcibly married to Khuman warrior Kaoba.

== See also ==
- Epic cycles of incarnations
- Moirang Ningthourol Lambuba
- Khamba Thoibi

== Bibliography ==
- Birmangal, M. (1970). Yaithingkonu (in Manipuri). Internet Archive; Digital Library of India.
- Kokngang Singh, P. (2008). Apunba Saklon (in Manipuri). Digital Library of India; Internet Archive.
