= Yaithing Konu =

Yaithing Konu (ꯌꯥꯏꯊꯤꯡ ꯀꯣꯅꯨ), also spelled Yaithing Konnu (ꯌꯥꯏꯊꯤꯡ ꯀꯣꯟꯅꯨ), is a central female figure in the love story of Moirang Kangleirol, a traditional narrative from the ancient kingdom of Moirang, in present-day Manipur. She is known for her tragic romance with Khuyol Haoba and her forced marriage to Kaoba Hingamba, the Khuman warrior. According to the old Meitei chronicle text Khuman Kangleiron, she became the queen of the Khuman kingdom by marriage to Kaoba (also known as Kaopa), who was the king of that realm.

== Background ==
Yaithing Konu was the daughter of Luwang Huiningsumba, a powerful nobleman of the Luwang clan in the Moirang kingdom. She was admired for her beauty, grace, and intelligence. Her social status and lineage placed her among the highest-ranking women of her time.

== Meeting Khuyol Haoba ==
Yaithing Konu met Khuyol Haoba, the orphaned son of a former royal official, during a festive event on Loktak Lake. On that day, all young women of Moirang were fishing as part of a ritual celebration, and men were not allowed to enter the water. When Konu's fishing net broke, Haoba happened to be nearby and helped her. They fell in love at first sight.

Their secret love grew stronger over time, even as Haoba lived in hiding to escape a planned human sacrifice falsely justified by a nobleman’s scheme.

== Forced marriage to Kaoba ==
The turning point in Konu’s life came during a royal hunting expedition. Her father, Huiningsumba, accidentally caused a forest fire that spread to the Khuman region, destroying the home and barn of Kaoba Hingamba, a Khuman warrior. In retaliation, Kaoba captured Huiningsumba and his men.

To save their lives, Huiningsumba was forced to offer his daughter, Yaithing Konu, as ransom. The Moirang court agreed, and a grand marriage ceremony was held. Konu was sent to Kaoba’s household, even though she was already three months pregnant with Khuyol Haoba’s child.

According to the Khuman Kangleiron, an old Meitei text, Kaoba (also referred to as Kaopa) was a king of the Khuman kingdom, and by this marriage, Yaithing Konu became queen of the Khuman people.

== Secret reunions and exile ==
Despite her new status, Yaithing Konu remained emotionally devoted to Haoba. Haoba disguised himself as a hill-man to visit her in secret. Eventually, Kaoba discovered these visits. In anger, he drove Konu out of his house. After her exile, she was reunited with Haoba, and the lovers were finally together again.

== See also ==
- Meitei marriage
- List of Khuman and Luwang common ancestral monarchs
