= Ura Naha Khongjomba and Pidonnu =

Old Meitei historical tale of Moirang kingdom

The story of Ura Naha Khongjomba and Pidonnu

Folk tale
- Name: The story of Ura Naha Khongjomba and Pidonnu
- Aarne–Thompson grouping: no
- Mythology: Meitei mythology
- Country: Ancient Kangleipak (historical); India (present)
- Region: Moirang, Manipur
- Origin Date: During the reign of Moilang king Iwang Puriklai Laijing Punsiba (1138–1210)
- Related: Meitei folklore, Meitei literature

The ancient legend of Ura Naha Khongjomba and Pidonnu (Meitei: Khongjomba-Pidongnu) is an epic cycle of incarnations of Meitei mythology and folklore from the Moirang kingdom (Note: Moirang was an independent kingdom in early times, and later became a province of the unified Manipur Kingdom.) of Ancient Kangleipak (early Manipur). It concerns the love and adventures of the forgotten prince Ura Naha Khongjomba for the beautiful woman Pidonnu.

== Characters ==
Ura Naha Khongjomba (Old Manipuri: Khongchompa; regnal name: Iwang Puriklai Khongjomba) (1210–1263) was the biological son of King Laijing Ningthou Punsiba (1138–1210) of Moirang and Lady Tonu Laijinglembi, but he was born in the house of his foster father, Kadeng Thangjahanba, the second husband of Tonu Laijinglembi.

Pidonnu (Old Manipuri: Pitonnu; also spelled as "Pidonu" or "Pidongnu") was the daughter of a nobleman of Moirang.

== Plot ==
King Laijing Ningthou Punsiba is unaware that his biological son Khongjomba was born into the house of Kadeng Thangjahanba. Unable to produce any further sons and lacking an heir, he consults his courtiers court and chooses a young man named Nidrām, on the strength of his princely moral standards, to be his successor.

After Kadeng Thangjahanba dies in the prime time of his life, his wife Tonu Laijinglembi is afraid that her son Khongjomba will come to harm if his true parentage is revealed. She flees with her young son into the hills, seeking asylum in the house of her husband's friend, the chief of Leihou tribe. There she lives until her son grows to manhood. During that time, as planned by God Thangching, the people of Moirang forget about Tonu and Khongjomba, and thus refuse to help them upon their return to the town. Now living in poverty, Khongjomba collects firewood daily for Tonu to sell in the market.

One day, Khongjomba meets Lady Pidonnu during a game of kang (a traditional Meitei game) played between ladies and gentlemen. Nidrām, the royal heir, becomes immediately jealous. He sends his men to attack Khongjomba, but they are overcome by the powerful Khongjomba. Nidrām thus looks for other ways to harass Khongjomba.

A special day arrives where the ladies of Moirang participate in a large fishing event at Loktak Lake. It is customary that men were not allowed near the lake on this special day. As Khongjomba wanders around the lake, he is caught and beaten by Nidrām and his men. Tonu runs to King Laijing Ningthou Punsiba to save her son's life. The king remembers that Tonu was pregnant with his child when she left him. Tonu then reveals Khongjomba's true parentage. King Laijing Ningthou Punsiba is surprised and alarmed. Without delay, he crowns his true son Khongjomba as the sovereign of Moirang, and discards the appointed heir Nidrām.

Later, the two lovers King Ura Naha Khongjomba and Lady Pidonnu are married and live happily ever after.

== See also ==
- Akongjamba and Phouoibi
- Henjunaha and Lairoulembi
- Kadeng Thangjahanba and Tonu Laijinglembi
- Khamba and Thoibi
- Khuyol Haoba and Yaithing Konu
