= Kadeng Thangjahanba and Tonu Laijinglembi =

Old Meitei legend

The story of Kadeng Thangjahanba and Tonu Laijinglembi

Folk tale
- Name: The story of Kadeng Thangjahanba and Tonu Laijinglembi
- Aarne–Thompson grouping: no
- Mythology: Meitei mythology
- Country: Ancient Kangleipak (historical); India (present)
- Region: Moirang, Manipur
- Origin Date: During the reign of Moilang king Iwang Puriklai Laijing Punsiba (1138–1210)
- Related: Meitei folklore, Meitei literature

The ancient legend of Kadeng Thangjahanba and Tonu Laijinglembi (Meitei: Kadeng-Tonu) is an epic cycle of incarnations of Meitei mythology and folklore from Moirang kingdom (Note: Moirang was an independent kingdom in early times, and later became a province of the unified Manipur Kingdom.) of Ancient Kangleipak (early Manipur). It concerns the fateful love of Kadeng Thangjahanba, a skilled blacksmith, for the beautiful Tonu Laijinglembi.

== Characters ==
Tonu Laijinglembi and Kadeng Thangjahanba are real historical figures who lived in the 12th century during the reign of Moilang king Iwang Puriklai Laijing Punsiba (1138–1210). In Meitei mythology, God Thangching (or 'Thangjing') blessed Henjunaha and Lairoulembi to be reborn as Kadeng Thangjahanba and Tonu Laijinglembi. Writers and ballad singers of olden times interwove the two stories, creating a "cycle of regeneration and rebirth".

Kadeng Thangjahanba (Old Manipuri: Kateng Thangchahanpa) was a highly talented and skillful royal chief metalsmith appointed by King Laijing Ningthou Punsiba (Old Manipuri: Laiching Ningthou Punsipa) of Moirang.

Tonu Laijinglembi (Old Manipuri: Tonu Laichinglempi) was the only daughter of Laijing Lakpa (Old Manipuri: Laiching Lakpa), a favourite nobleman of the King of Moirang.

== Plot ==
Kadeng Thangjahanba is matchless in the art of blacksmithing, and thus earns the favour of King Laijing Ningthou Punsiba of the Moirang kingdom and is appointed as the royal chief blacksmith. At the same time, Kadeng is having a romantic affair with the lady Tonu Laijinglembi.

As per the ancient traditional customs of Moirang, Kadeng is given the duty of going on a hunting expedition to gather wild animals for an annual festival; he leaves for many months. Meanwhile, King Laijing Ningthou Punsiba, having no son to succeed him, is very upset. The king consults the royal high priest, who suggests that a male heir can be achieved only if the king marries a lady of the King's namesake. Immediately, the king sends his men to find women in his kingdom with a name similar to his; they find only lady Tonu Laijinglembi. (Tonu Laijinglembi's name contains the word "Laijing", which is similar to the "Laijing" in King Laijing Ningthou Punsiba.) Tonu is reluctant, but cannot deny the royal proposal for the wedding. And so, during Kadeng's absence, Tonu and the king get married.

Kadeng returns from his hunting expedition, and is shocked and saddened to hear the news of his lover getting married. Kadeng crafts two beautiful swords: on the side of one sword, he engraves the images of Tonu and himself; on the other side of the sword, he engraves the images of the king and Tonu as the young queen. Kadeng presents the swords to the king as gifts. Initially, King Laijing Ningthou Punsiba does not understand the meaning of the coded images.

Kadeng becomes extremely careless of his health, thereby falling seriously ill. The king is deeply concerned about Kadeng's deteriorating health conditions. But among everyone, Tonu is the most in grief. Seeing this, the king realises the meaning of the images engraved in the swords.

Without hesitation, King Laijing Ningthou Punsiba sends Tonu Laijinglembi to the house of Kadeng Thangjahanba. Defying all the odds, the two lovers finally unite and live happily ever after. However, Tonu secretly carries in her womb the king's child, who is to become Ura Naha Khongjomba.

=== Sangai deer ===
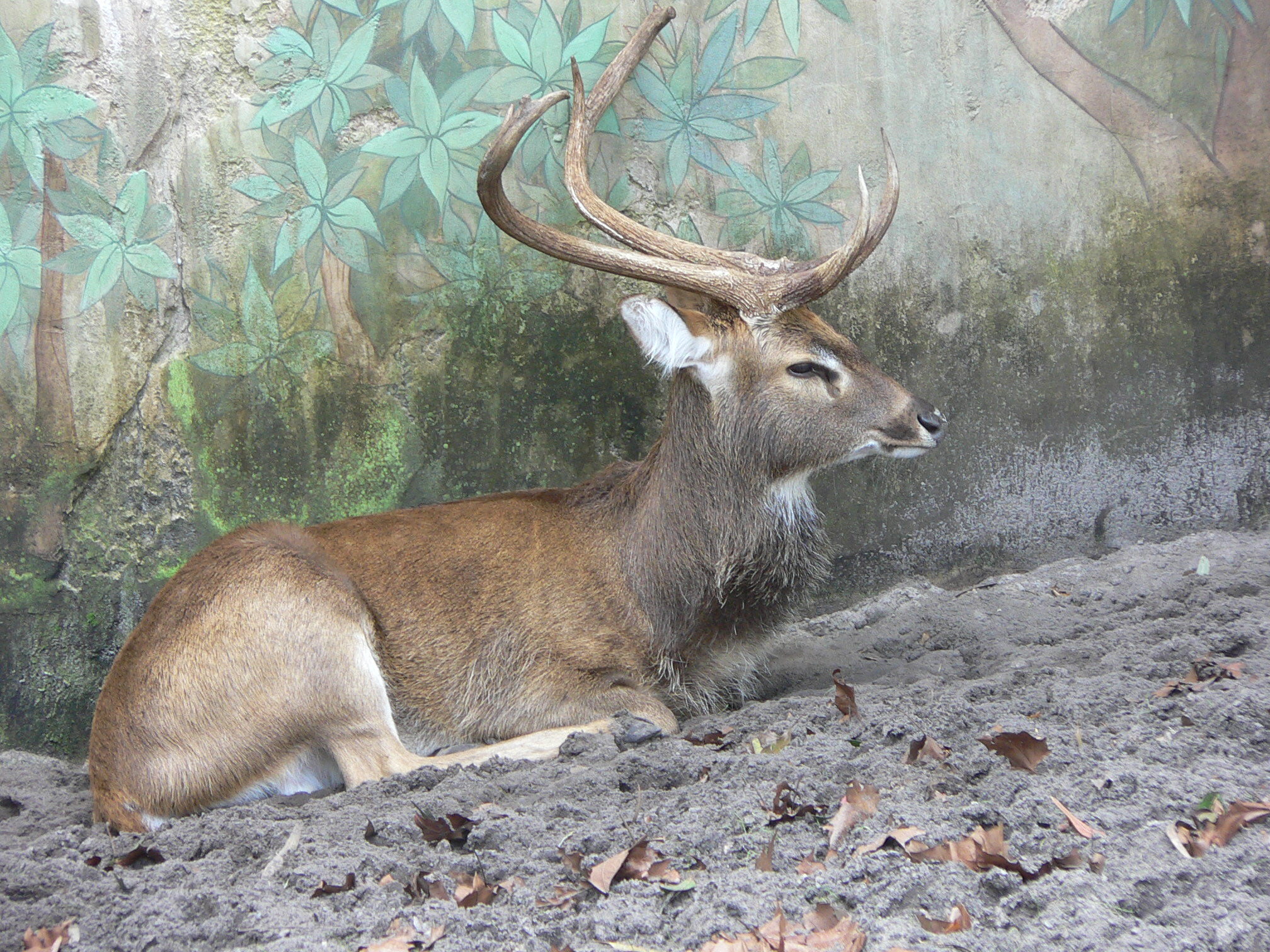
Sangai deer

During his hunting expedition, Kadeng Thangjahanba captured a Sangai deer from a place called "Torbung Lamjao" to present as a token of love to his lover, Lady Tonu Laijinglembi. However, when he learns that his beloved lady has married King Laijing Ningthou Punsiba, his hopes are dashed. In sorrow, he releases the deer into the wild of Keibul Lamjao (present day Keibul Lamjao National Park area). According to folklore, these deer have lived in the Keibul Lamjao region since then.

== In contemporary art and culture ==
Tonu Laijinglembi (2014) – a drama written by Sarangthem Bormani and directed by B Jugolchandra, shown on 22 March 2014; organised by the Manipur Dramatic Union.

Tonu Laijinglembi Seitharol (28 April 2018) – the Meitei Mayek edition of the book "Tonu Laijinglembi Seitharol" written by Hijam Guno.

Tonu Laijinglembi (2018) – a drama based on the character of the same name, directed by L Bikram of the "Aryan Theatre, Imphal", was released on 30 March 2018 during the 6th All Manipur Folk Drama Festival in Imphal.

== See also ==
- Akongjamba and Phouoibi
- Henjunaha and Lairoulembi
- Khamba and Thoibi
- Khuyol Haoba and Yaithing Konu
