= Khamba and Thoibi =

Old Meitei legend

Khamba and Thoibi, Manipur
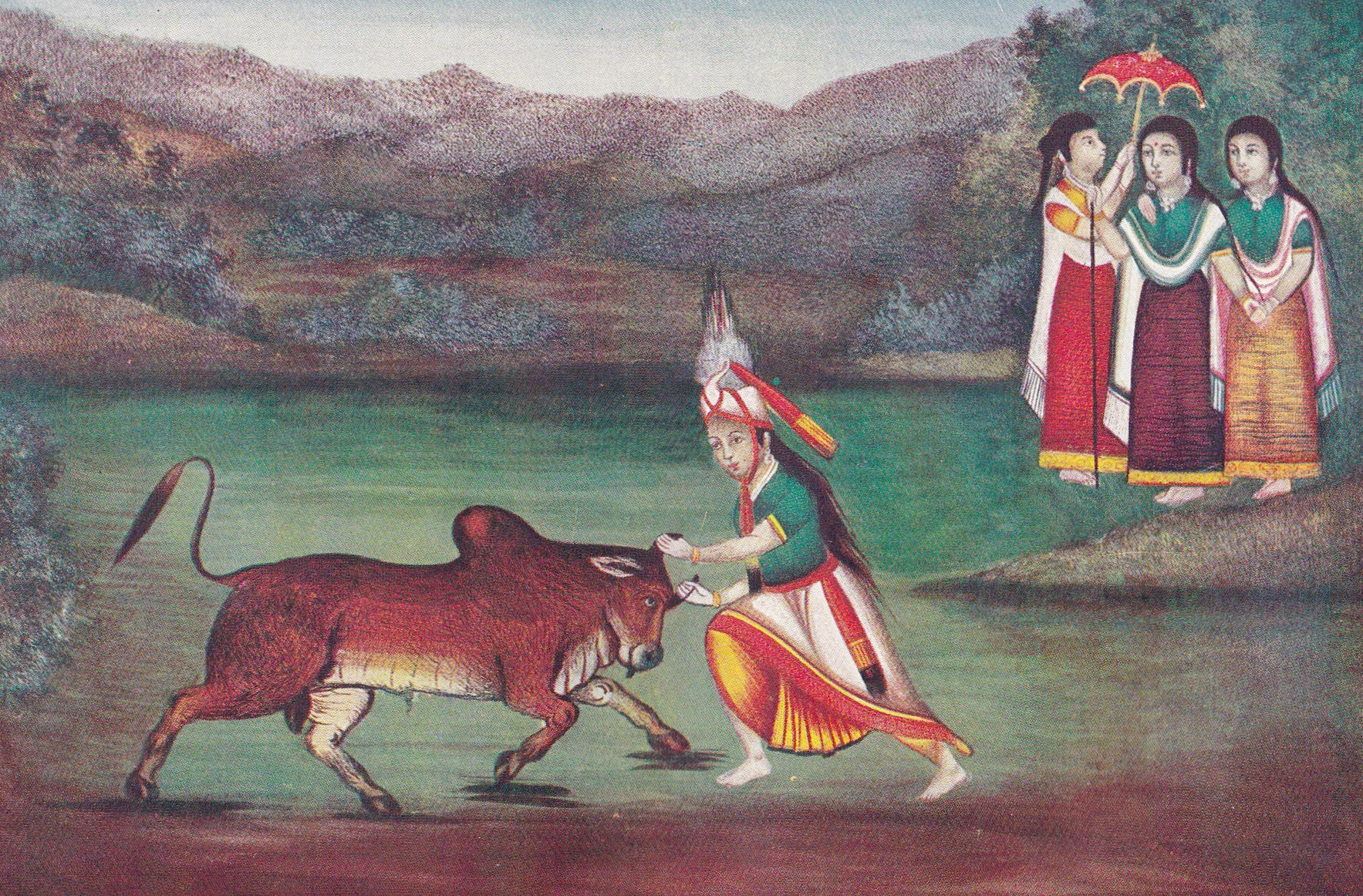
- The capture the wild bull

Folk tale
- Name: Khamba and Thoibi, Manipur
- Also known as: Khampa Thoipi (Ancient Meitei Language)
- Aarne–Thompson grouping: no
- Mythology: Meitei mythology
- Country: India
- Region: Manipur
- Origin Date: 11th-12th century CE
- Published in: Khamba Thoibi Sheireng and many others
- Related: Meitei folklore (Manipuri folklore), Meitei literature (Manipuri literature)

Khamba and Thoibi is a romantic tale found in the cyclic epic Moirang Shayon, a classic of Meitei literature from the 11th or 12th century.

During the reign of King Iwang Puriklai Chingkhu Telheiba (1083–1138 AD), Khuman Khamba, an orphan raised by his elder sister, and Princess Thoibi, the niece of the King of Moirang, fall in love. After facing conspiracies, hardships, threats and even murder attempts, the two lovers are united.

== Literary Classic ==
Khamba and Thoibi is a treasured classic of Meitei literature, It is one of the romantic tales told in the Moirang Shayon, a 12th century cyclic epic of seven incarnations (nine in some versions) of two divine lovers in the kingdom of Keke Moirang (part of modern Manipur. It has been called Manipur's "national romantic legend" by Indian scholar Suniti Kumar Chatterjee.

The story has been told and retold by many authors in many editions. One of the best known is Khamba Thoibi Sheireng (Meitei: ꯈꯝꯕ ꯊꯣꯏꯕꯤ ꯁꯩꯔꯦꯡ), an eight-volume, 39,000-line epic poem in Pena Saisak folk ballad style, composed by Hijam Angangha and published in 1940. It has been called the national epic of Manipur.

Khamba and Thoibi has given rise to Moirang sai (Meitei: ꯃꯣꯏꯔꯥꯡ ꯁꯥꯏ), a traditional Meitei performance of the story of Khamba and Thoibi in song and dance.

Khamba and Thoibi has also become a classic of Assamese literature having been translated into Assamese as Khamba Thoibir Sadhukatha, by Assamese author and anthropologist Rajanikanta Bordoloi (1869-1939).

== Summary ==
In the reign of Chingkhu Telheiba, King of Keke Moirang, a Khuman, Aton Puremba, killed nine tigers with his bow and arrows and presented their skins to the King. Puremba wished to reward Perumba. He had no daughter, so he gave Puremba his wife, and by her the bold hunter had two children, a daughter called Khamnu and her brother, Khamba.

Telheiba had no children of his own, but his brother Chingkhu Akhuba, the crown prince had a daughter, Thoibi, who he doted on.

When Puremba and his wife died, the King's General Thonglen took charge of his children. But Thonglen, preoccupied with affairs of state, neglected the children, and they fell into poverty and begging. When Khamnu grew up, she supported herself by selling vegetables.

=== Khamba meets Thoibi ===
The God Thangjing planned to unite Khamba and Pricess Thoibi.

One day Princess Thoibi met Khamnu at the market and befriended her.

Khamba, who was now grown up, decided that he was old enough to find work to help support himself and his sister. He went to the home of Prince Chingkhu Akhuba, looking for a day's work. The Prince asked Khamba about his family, but Khamba did not reveal the names of his parents. The Prince fed Khamba, and gave him new clothes. Princess Thoibi, seeing Khamba's handsome face, fell in love with him. When Khamba returned home, and told his sister where he had spent the day, she forbade him to return, worried that her brother might offend the powerful prince in some way.

Thoibi waited in vain for Khamba to return, but he never reappeared. One day the young girls of Keke Moirang planned a to go fishing on Loktak Lake. Princess Thoibi invited her new friend Khamnu to her fish from her boat. The King asked the young men of Moirang to stay away from the lake that day, but the message did not reach Khamba, and besides, he was hungry. He rowed his boat into the lake in to look for his sister, but his boat was unexpectedly pushed towards Thoibi, and he crashed into the bamboo frame her net. Khamnu was worried that her brother might be punisghed for disobeying the King, so she pretended not to know him. But, Thoibi noticed a bracelet that she, herself had given to Khamnu on Khamba's wrist and concluded that Khamba must be Khamnu's brother.

=== The Rivals ===
Khamba joined the other young men of Moirang in a wrestling competition. Nongthonba, the king's minister, was impressed by Khamba’s skill and recognised him as the son of his dead friend Puremba. He recalled that Puremba had promised his daughter Khamnu in marriage to Nongthonba's eldest son. Nongthonba introduced Khamba to the King and royal court.

A young courtier, Nongban Kongyanba was rich, handsome, and arrogant and he was determined to marry Princess Thoibi. Nongban was jealous of his rival, Khamba, but still, they set out together to gather orchids to offer to Lord Thangjing. Khamba asked Nongban which path to take, and, spitefully, Nongban sent him to a spot where there were no flowers while he himself went to a place where they were plentiful. Khamba was soon lost. He directed his prayers for help to prayed to Thangjing, and a tribal woman (Thangjing in disguise) appeared and helped him to find the flowers and find his way back to the main path.

On the day of Thangjing's festival, Nongban, after made his offering of orchids Thangjing and then presented one blossom to Thoibi. As soon as Nongban left, Thoibi discarded Nongban's unwanted gift. Lord Thangjing, becoming angry Thoibi had thrown away a flower that had been part of his offering, cursed her with three months of separation from her lover.

The offering of flowers was followed by games and sports. Khamba defeated Nongban in racing, wrestling and khong kangjei (indigenous hockey). Nongban, furious at the defeat, planned his revenge. Meanwhile, the King gave Khamba many gifts.

=== The Bull ===
Thangjing arranged another event to enhance Khamba's reputation.

Nongban encountered a woman from the far side of Loktak Lake fishing near Moirang. She told him that she was afraid to fish on that side, as a wild bull had appeared there, and was attacking anyone it saw. Nongban saw a fine opportunity rid himself of Khamba. He pretended to the King that Thangjing had told him that only Khamba would be capable of killing the bull. The King asked Khamba to capture the bull. Khamba recognised Nongban's plotting, but he wasn't afraid of the bull.

The bull had once belonged to Khamba's father. Instead of trying to subdue the bull by force, he caught it by the horns and spoke softly, telling the bull that he belonged to the Khuman clan and that the bull didn't frighten him. When the bull heard the word Khuman he realized that Khamba was the son of his former master, Puremba. He stopped fighting, became quite tame, and allowed Khamba to lead him with a rope.

Nongban, seeing that the bull had ceased to fight, asked to hold the rope. When Khamba, Nongban, and the bull reached the Kings, Nongban claimed that it was he who had rescued Khamba from the bull. Khamba suggested that Nongban could demonstrate his skill by dropping the rope and catching bull again, in front of the King and the crowd of spectators. Nongban was too afraid to try, so everyone saw the truth. The King declared that Princess Thoibi daughter would be given in marriage to Khamba.

The two young men then entered an archery competition in which the King and crown prince would fire arrows, and the competitors would chase and return them. Nongban had engaged a sorcerer to weaken the King's bow. When the King loosed an arrow, it did not fly far and Nongban was able to retrieve it quickly. The Prince bow was unaffected, and his shot's shot was long. When Khamba chased the arrow, his clothing flew open, showing his distinctively embroidered shirt. The crown prince recognized it as a shirt from his own wardrobe that Princess Thoibi, his daughter, had given as a gift to Khamba. Annoyed, he refused the arrow from Khamba's hand and contradicted the King by declaring that Thoibi would marry Nongban.

Nongban and the prince planned to get rid of Khamba. One night, Nongban appeared at Khamba's home and insisted that he forget marrying Thoibi. He refused, and Nongban and his father replied by beating Khamba unconscious. The Prince then had Khamba tied to the feet of an elephant, though the mahout didn't tie the knots too tightly, so Khamba was still able to breathe. They dragged Khamba around and around the market place, until he was battered and bruised. Meanwhile, the Goddess Panthoibi appeared to the sleeping Thoibi in a dream, warning her of what was happening to Khamba. The Princess woke up and raced to the market place. There, she found Khamba, who was badly injured, and released him from his bonds. When the prince heard what she had done and that Khamba was stll alive, he was furious- so furious that he declared he would exile his daughter to Kabaw and never see her again.

In Kabaw, Thoibi was taken in and cared for by the nobleman Tamurakpa. Withing three months, the Prince regretted his treatment of his daughter and he dispached Nongban to retrieve her from Tamurakpa's house. After they set out, Thoibi complained of fatigue and asked that she be given a horse to ride. Nongban let Thoibi mount his fastest his fastest horse, and as soon as she did, she sped off for Khamba's house. Nongban complained to the King about how Thoibi had tricked him and tried to persuade Thonglen and Nongthon to punish Khamba, but they refused.

=== The Tiger ===
Lord Thangjing then assumed the form of a young woman, and approached the King's durbar. She told the King that a marauding tiger had killed a young girl and was manacing the people around Loktak Lake. He proclaimed that Khamba and Nongban would set out on a tigher hund, and whichever of them killed the dangerous beast would marry Princess Thoibi.

In the morning, the hunt began. The two young men found the girl's body in the tiger's lair. When the tiger attacked, Khamba wounded it and drove it off. He followed it into the jungle and fond and found the tiger waiting for in a hollow. As the tiger sprang Khamba speared it's head, driving the spear through its jaws killing it. The King rewarded Khamba richly, showering him with gifts and endowing him with lands and titles.

Khamba and Thoibi were finally able to marry, but their happiness was short-lived.

Khamba took it into his head that he should test Thoibi's fidelity. So, one night, under cover of darkness, he pretended to be another man and attempted to seduce Thoibi. In a rage, Thoibi flung open her door and hurled a knife at Khamba, killing him. The grief-stricken Thoibi ended by taking her own life.

== Editions ==
- The Story of Khamba and Thoibi, an 1877 English language prose version written by G. H. Damant, published in The Indian Antiquary.
- Khamba and Thoibi, an English language prose version, that appears in T. C. Hodsn's 1908 book The Meitheis.
- Khamba Thoibi Sheireng, a 1940 Meitei language epic poem by Hijam Anganghal
- Khamba Thoibi and Poems on Manipur, a 1963 English language poetry work, by Vimala Raina.
- Khamba and Thoibi: The Unscaled Height of Love, a 1976 English language prose by N. Tombi Singh
- Khamba Thoibigi Wari Amasung Mahakavya, a Meitei-language prose version by Khwairakpam Chaoba.

== In popular culture ==
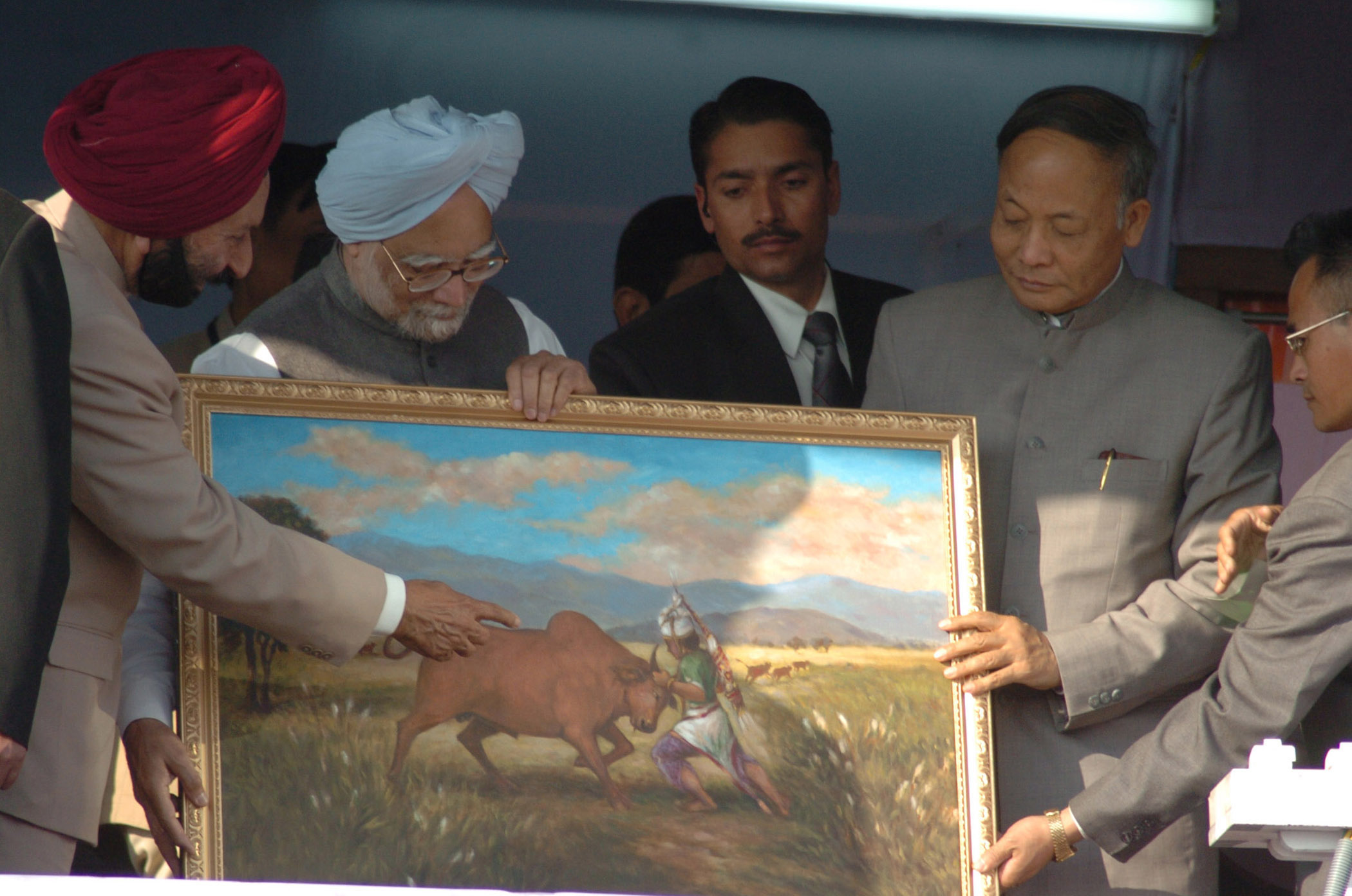
Manmohan Singh, then Prime Minister of India, receiving a painting of Khamba capturing the Bull, by Shivinder Singh Sidhu, then Governor of Manipur and Okram Ibobi Singh, then Chief Minister of Manipur, 2 December 2006

- Kao Faba (Meitei: ꯀꯥꯎ ꯐꯥꯕ) is a 2020 Meitei language Shumang Kumhei, based on the story of the capture of bull by Khuman Khamba, produced by Western Cultural Association in Manipur.
- Kao, the sacred bull is a 2011 Meitei opera produced by the Laihui Ensemble, based on the story of the capture of the bull by Khuman Khamba.
- Khambana Kao Phaba (Meitei: ꯈꯝꯕꯅ ꯀꯥꯎ ꯐꯥꯕ, lit. 'Khamba capturing the bull') is an oil painting by Manipuri artists, M Betombi Singh and Gopal Sharma.
- Khamba Khamnu (Meitei: ꯈꯝꯕ ꯈꯝꯅꯨ) is a 1995 Meitei language feature film, produced by Chandam Shyamacharan for C.S.Films Imphal Productions, written by Th. Nodia and directed by Ch. Shyamacharan.
- Khamba Thoibi (Meitei: ꯈꯝꯕ ꯊꯣꯏꯕꯤ) is a 1997 Meitei language feature film, based on the epic story by Hijam Anganghal, produced by Moirangthem Nilamani Singh for Anjana Films, and directed by M. Nilamani Singh.
- Langon (Meitei: ꯂꯥꯡꯉꯣꯟ) is a Meitei-language feature film, based on Khamba and Thoibi.

== See also ==
- Numit Kappa
- Akongjamba and Phouoibi
- Henjunaha and Lairoulembi
- Khuyol Haoba and Yaithing Konu
- Kadeng Thangjahanba and Tonu Laijinglembi
- Ura Naha Khongjomba and Pidonnu
- Wanglen Pungdingheiba and Sappa Chanu Silheibi
