= Khuyol Haoba and Yaithing Konu =

Ancient Meitei legend

The story of Khuyol Haoba and Yaithing Konu

Folk tale
- Name: The story of Khuyol Haoba and Yaithing Konu
- Also known as: Meitei: Haoba Konu
- Aarne–Thompson grouping: no
- Mythology: Meitei mythology (Manipuri mythology)
- Country: Ancient Kangleipak (historical); India (present)
- Region: Moirang, Manipur
- Origin Date: During the reign of King Iwang Puriklai Sana Lakhwa (185-236)
- Related: Meitei folklore (Manipuri folklore), Meitei literature (Manipuri literature)

The ancient legend of Khuyol Haoba and Yaithing Konu (Meitei: Haoba-Konu) is one of the epic cycles of incarnations of Meitei mythology and folklore, that is originated from Moirang kingdom (Note: Moirang was an independent kingdom in early times, though later became a province of a unified kingdom, called Manipur Kingdom.) of Ancient Kangleipak (early Manipur). It concerns the fateful love of Khuyol Haoba (Old Manipuri: Khuyol Haopa), (Note: The word "Khuyol" is also spelled as "Khuyon", "Khoyol" and "Khoyon". The word "Haoba" is also spelled as "Hauba".) an orphan man, for the beautiful Yaithing Konu. Khuyol Haoba was the son of late Khundouremba (Old Manipuri: Khuntoulempa), a court official of Moirang. Yaithing Konu was the daughter of Luwang Huiningsumba (Old Manipuri: Luwang Huiningsumpa), an influential nobleman of Moirang.

== History ==
Khuyol Haoba and Yaithing Konu were historical figures who lived during the reign of Moilang King Sana Lakhwa (185-236) in Moirang kingdom, as stated in the text named the Kanglei Lamthon Puya. The story was later crafted into a legendary account by adding mythological elements such as the divine intervention of God Thangching who wished Yaithing Konu to seek help from Khuyol Haoba, thereby making the two fell in love with each other.

== Plot ==
=== Childhood of Khuyol Haoba ===
Orphan young Khuyol Haoba was brought up by his elder sister. His late father Khundouremba used to hold the court office to look after the royal religious rites and rituals, to take care of a rare sacred bamboo species called Tesa, to remove the creepers of the Tayan (also spelled as "Tayal") species and to burnish the divine metal mask. After the demise of Khundouremba, God Thangching (Thangjing) made the king, the friends and the relatives of Khundouremba to be heedless of the two children, Khuyol Haoba and his elder sister. Hence, the two children live in a poor way of life.

=== Escaping from the oracular conspiracy ===
As time passed, Khuyol Haoba grew up into a handsome lad. However, he used to hide among the phumdis of the Loktak lake to save himself from the human sacrifice as demanded by the presiding deity of Moirang in accordance to an oracle. In reality, the prophecy of the oracle was a barbaric brutal conspiracy devised by a nobleman named Thangarakpa (Old Manipuri: Thangkalakpa), who was jealous of the late Khundouremba, and so, he wanted to eliminate the latter's young son Khuyol Haoba. Thangarakpa took the opportunity in the occurrence of drought and famine in Moirang, and bribed a fake god-man to declare that only the offering of an orphan man could please God Thangching (Thangjing) to diminish the sufferings of the people.

=== Meeting with Lady Yaithing Konu ===
During one of his hiding occasions, Khuyol Haoba met Lady Yaithing Konu. All the unmarried ladies of Moirang came together at the Loktak lake for fishing as a part of the celebration of a festive occasion. On that particular day, no men were allowed to enter the waters of the Loktak. En passant, Lady Yaithing Konu's wooden frame of fishing net get broken. As it could be fixed only by men and as no man was available around, Konu was upset. In the meantime, Khuyol Haoba, who was hiding around the lake, came to her help for fixing the net's frame. The two fell in love at the first sight. As time passed on, fortunately, the king of Moirang got to know about Khuyol Haoba's identity and reinstated him to his late father's official position. The two lovers had enjoyed their life of love for some time. They submitted themselves to each other though not married to each other.

=== Firestorm as the action and wedding as the reaction ===
Once Huiningsumba (Yaithing Konu's father), went out for a hunt in the woods, as per the royal orders. Unable to find any prey, he burned the bushes of the forest to drive out the hiding animals. Within a few moments, the forest fire turned into a big firestorm and spread fastly to the neighbouring kingdom of the Khumans, burning the resident and the barn of a fierce Khuman warrior named Kaoba Hingamba. Witnessing the incident, Kaoba Hingamba's fury knew no bounds. He captured Huiningsumba and his men and demanded the captive's daughter as the ransom. Reluctant but having no other way, Huiningsumba agreed. Thus, Yaithing Konu and Kaoba Hingamba got married. During the wedding, Yaithing Konu was already conceived with Khuyol Haoba's child, for three months. She was distressed.

=== Continuation of the love affairs ===
Yaithing Konu's marriage to Kaoba Hingamba did not end her connection with Khuyol Haoba. Khuyol Haoba used to visit Yaithing Konu, impersonating himself as a man from the hills, working for Kaoba Hingamba. They continued their romantic affairs even at the house of Kaoba Hingamba. Very soon, the relationship was noticed by Kaoba Hingamba, who kicked Yaithing Konu out of his house. The husband's dismissal of his wife turned into a fortune to the latter. Thus, Yaithing Konu and Khuyol Haoba got united and lived happily ever after.

== In contemporary art and culture ==
Yaithing Konu
It is a Meitei language novel by Hijam Anganghal (1892-1943).
Yaithing Konu (1948–49)
Rupmahal Theatre's drama titled Yaithing Konu (1949), directed by Meitram Bira (1916–78), was an adaptation of Hijam Anganghal's eponymous work.
Haoba Konu (1986)
It is a Meitei language work written by Heisnam Mangoljao.
Haoba Konu (2014)
It is a folk drama, written and directed by B. Jugolchandra Sharma, produced by the "Manipur Dramatic Union" (MDU) and sponsored by the Ministry of Culture (India), New Delhi.

== See also ==
- Akongjamba and Phouoibi
- Henjunaha and Lairoulembi
- Khamba and Thoibi
