= Meitei clothing =

Clothes in Meitei civilization

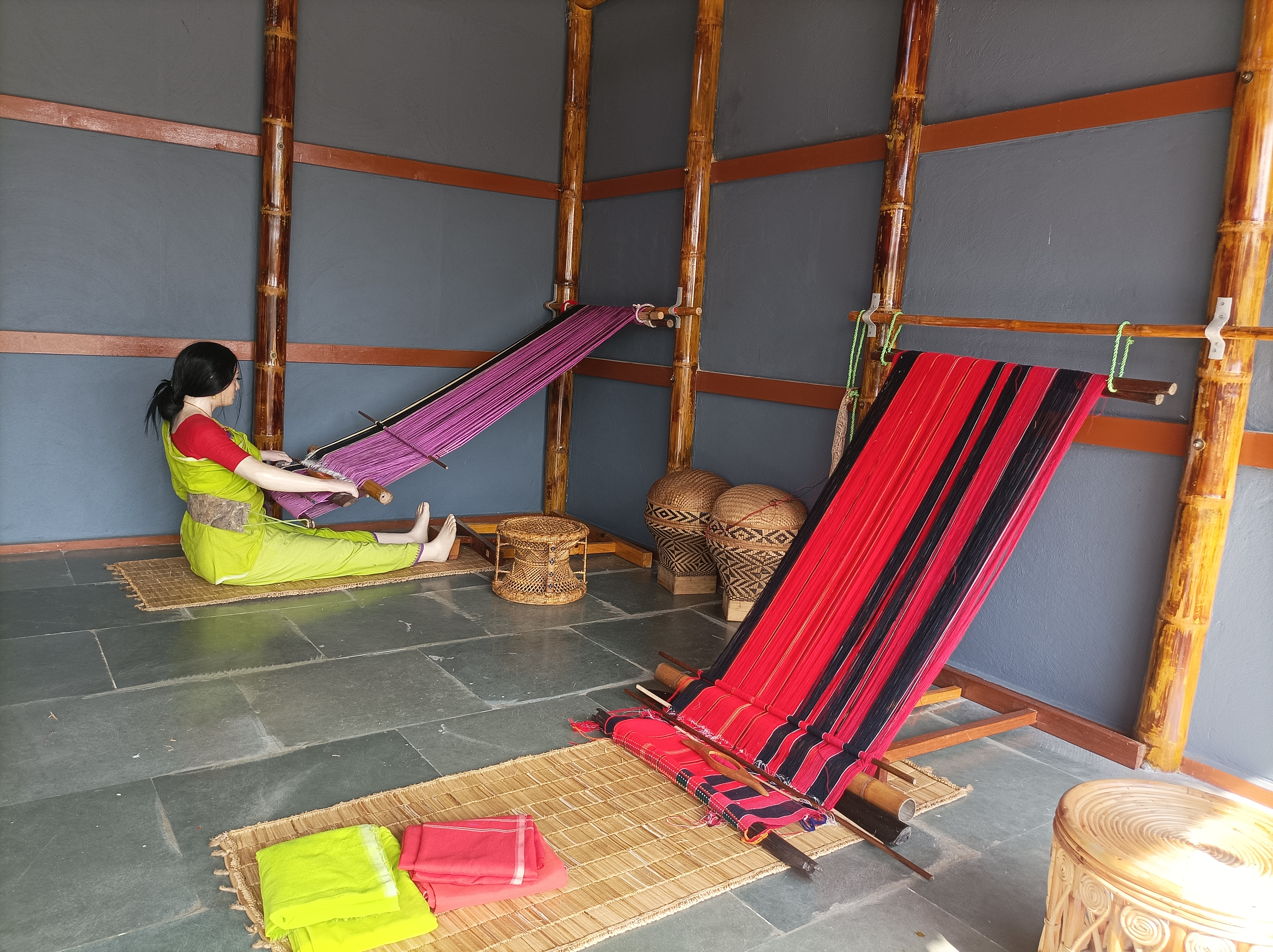
Depiction of a Meitei woman making traditional Meitei clothes, using indigenous tools and instruments

Meitei clothing, or Meitei attire, or Meitei costumes, or Meitei dresses, or Meitei dressing, or Meitei fabrics, or Meitei garments, or Meitei robes, or Meitei textiles (Meitei: Phee/Phi), refer to the traditional clothes of Meitei cultural heritage of Manipur as well as Assam, Bangladesh, Meghalaya, Myanmar (Burma), Nagaland, Tripura, etc.

Regarding men's clothing of Hindustan, British officer Colonel McCulloch stated, “the Munniporees far surpass the people to the west in the cleanliness of their garments”, (Note: "Munniporees" is an early British spelling of Manipuris, a synonym for Meitheis or Meiteis.) (Note: By "the west", McCulloch might mean the land that lies to the western side of Manipur or the western parts of Hindustan itself.) which is recorded in the 1908 book "The Meitheis", authored by Thomas Callan Hodson.

== Historical royal mandates ==
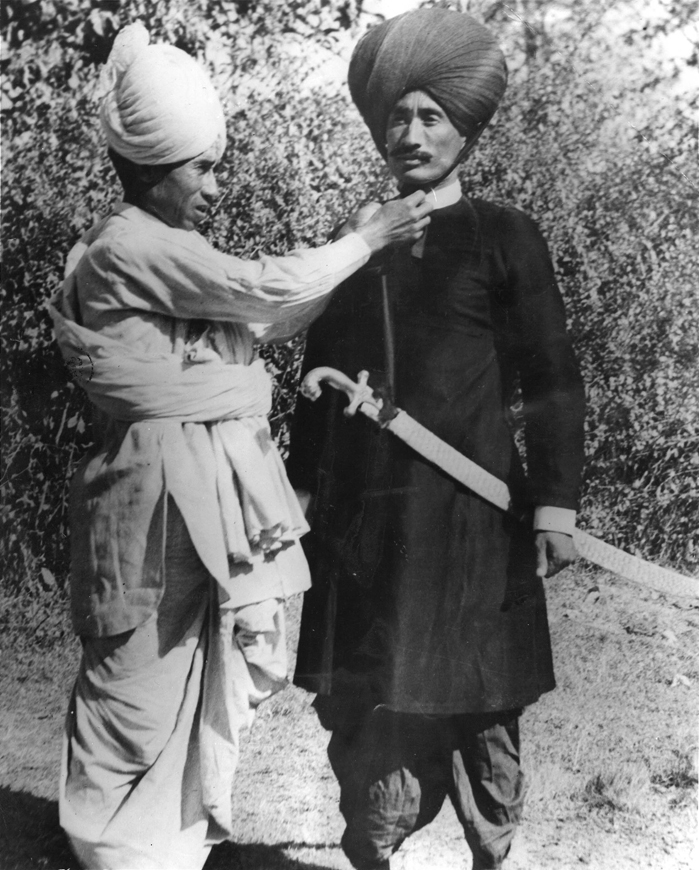
The then Prime Minister of Manipur (independent from India), preparing for the coronation of the new King Bodh Chandra Singh, wearing the pheijom loincloths, in 1944.

In the days of monarchy, unless permitted by the kings, various articles of dress and ornament could not be worn by commoners, and permission to wear any of these articles was much coveted. Persons of high rank were permitted to have carried before them a red woollen cloth; of a less rank, a green woollen cloth; and of a less still, a cloth of cotton manufacture. These they used as rugs to sit on, and it was only for such use they were prized; as articles of dress they might be used by any who could afford to buy them. Women were not allowed to wear clothes embroidered with gold either in the presence of the kings or elsewhere without permission. Descendants of the kings were not bound by this restriction.

== Men's clothing ==
The following sumptuary laws are recognized, and were enforced among the Meitheis by their own officials:-

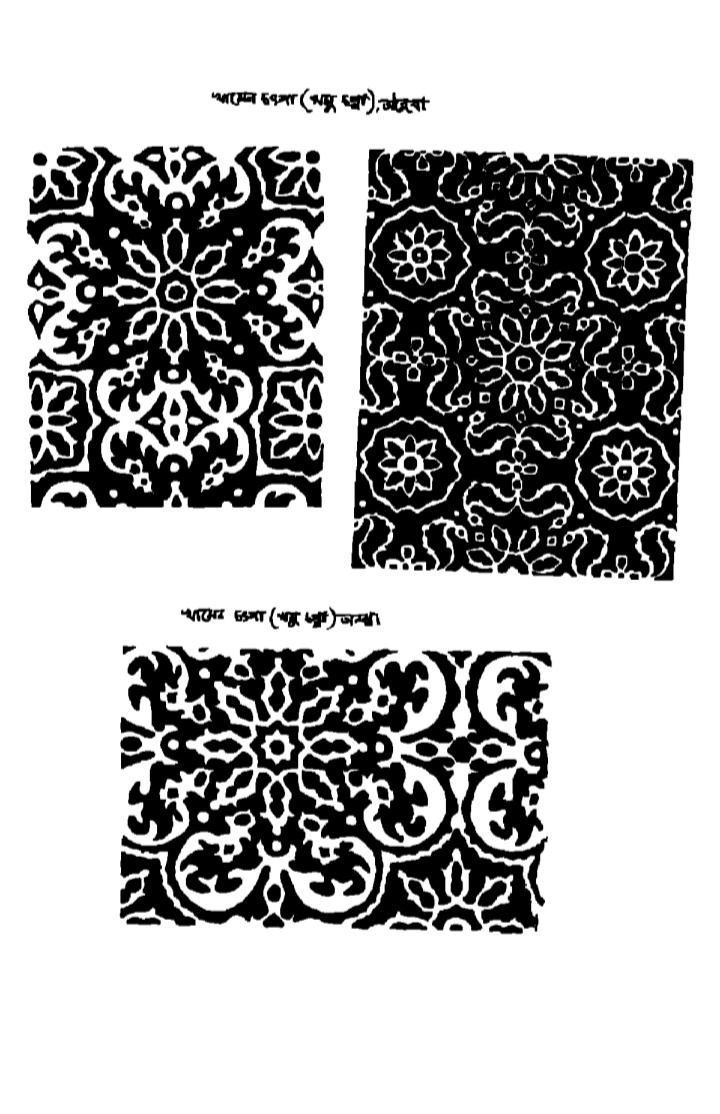
Classical Meitei designs for Khamenchatpa loincloth

=== Khamen Chatpa ===
The Khamen Chatpa (Meitei: ꯈꯥꯃꯦꯟ ꯆꯠꯄ) is a white silk loincloth, with purple patterns of scrolls stamped on it by means of wooden blocks, which gained wide popularity during the reign of King Khagemba (Meitei: ꯅꯤꯡꯊꯧ ꯈꯥꯒꯦꯝꯕ), around 1630 CE. Traditionally, it was not to be worn by persons of inferior rank, but male royalties might use it at their pleasure, a privilege which was extended to sons-in-law of a ruler.

=== Phige Napu ===
The Phige Napu (Meitei: ꯐꯤꯒꯦ ꯅꯥꯄꯨ) is an orange-coloured loincloth, which is usually worn by the male royalties. Children, however, are permitted to wear it.

=== Jugi Mari ===
The Jugi Mari (Meitei: ꯖꯨꯒꯤ ꯃꯔꯤ) is a red silk loincloth which may be worn in the presence of the king, by persons who hold titles of office as members of the Cheirap (Meitei for 'Court') (Meitei: ꯆꯩꯔꯥꯞ), or by the favour of the king. On ordinary occasions, it may be worn by anybody, but not in the presence of the king.

=== Gulap Machu ===
The Gulap Machu (Meitei for 'rose-coloured') (Meitei: ꯒꯨꯂꯥꯞ ꯃꯆꯨ) silk loincloth, of a pretty pink shade, may be worn only by the privileged persons who hold office or enjoy the royal favour, but it may be worn by any one else on ordinary occasions provided the king is not present. Children may wear it at pleasure.

=== Headgears ===
Headgears or headdresses (Meitei: ꯀꯣꯛꯌꯦꯠ, romanized: Kokyet), with silk-patterned ends may be worn by descendants and relatives of the king and by those upon whom it is conferred as a mark of favour or distinction. Headgears with silk borders may not be worn in the presence of the king. Wrestlers and runners when performing in public wear a headgear with a projecting front, to which the name "lam khang poāk" (Meitei: ꯂꯝꯈꯥꯡ ꯄꯣꯑꯛ) is given. The king's immediate servants, when in attendance at his meals or when accompanying him to worship or when massaging him, wear the headgear so as to cover the mouth. Ordinary persons at ordinary times are not allowed to come into the presence of the king with their headgears coiled in this fashion, nor are they permitted to twist it in rough coils when entering the royal presence.

== Women's clothing ==
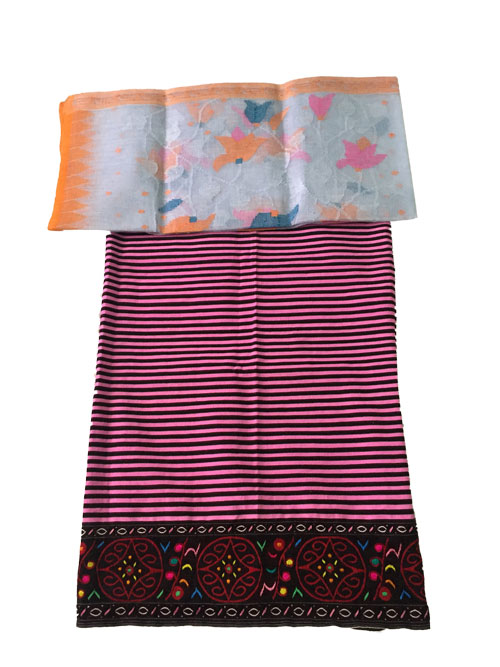
A typical Meitei phanek

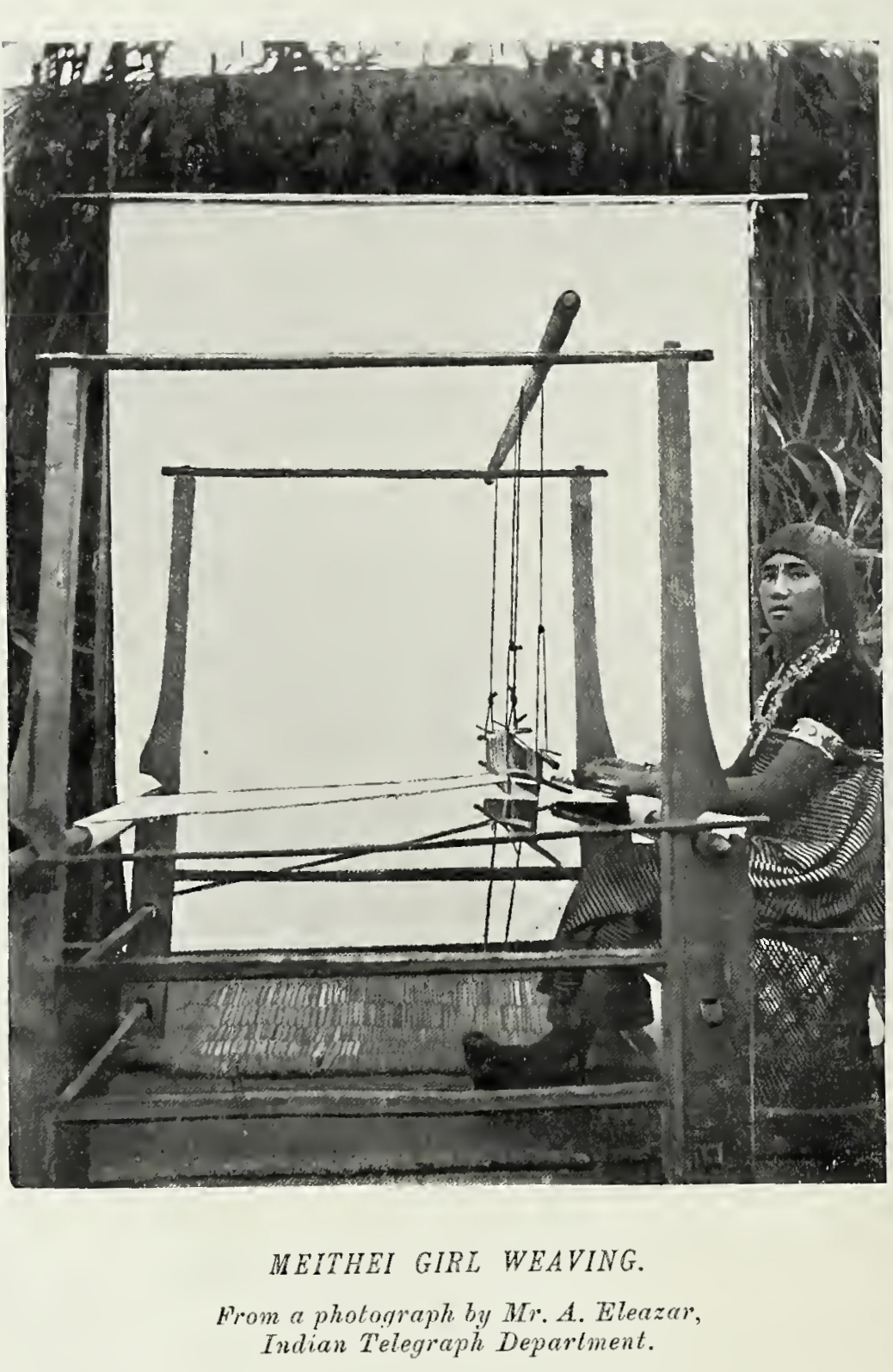
A Meitei woman making cloth

The dress of the women consists of a striped cotton or silk cloth passed round the body under the armpits and over the breast, a jacket, and a sheet. The dress of the women when of good quality is picturesque and pleasing. During the hot weather, it consists of a piece of cloth open except at the bottom, where it is stitched together by the edges for a few inches; this is folded round the body, under the armpits and over the breast, and tucked in by the hand at the side of the body. In length, it reaches the ground, but as this would be inconvenient in walking, it is hitched up about halfway to the knee, and tucked in again at the waist. This piece of cloth, called a fanek or phanek, is only wide enough to go one and a half times round the body; this gives enough room, however, for the legs in walking. The phanek or fanek (Meitei: ꯐꯅꯦꯛ) is made in cotton and silk, and the only patterns are stripes of various colours and widths running across the material, the groundwork being of different colours. The commoner patterns are red with green stripes, green and black, blue with black and white stripes, yellow and brown, dark blue with green and white stripes, etc. At the top and bottom of the garment is a broad margin, on which geometrical figures or patterns of various kinds are sewn by hand with floss silk in various colours. Over the phanek or fanek is worn a white sheet, which is folded in the usual native manner, the face, however, being left uncovered. In the cold season a short jacket with long sleeves is worn; this reaches below the bust over the phanek or fanek, and is worn tight fitting. The material is usually velvet or satin, black, blue, or green being the favourite colours. Female children, until puberty, or near it, wear the phanek or fanek round the waist, the upper part of the body being bare.

== Sport's clothing ==
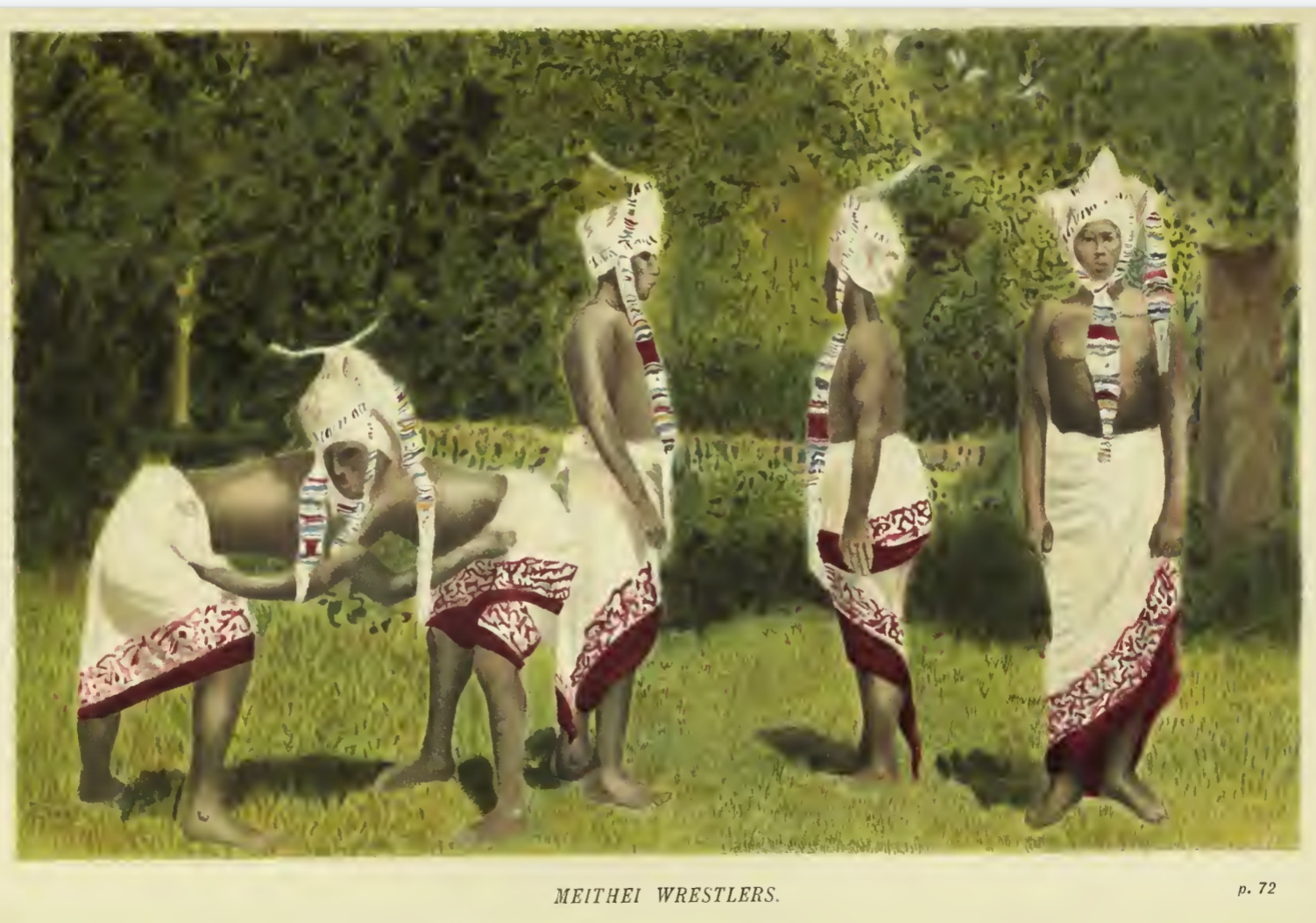
Meitei men wearing traditional clothes during Mukna wrestling

The national sports and games of Meitei kingdom afford an opportunity for special and elaborate costumes. On the occasion of the great annual boat-races, in which in former days the kings used to take part, the steersmen of the competing crews wear a khamen chatpa loincloth (Meitei: ꯈꯥꯃꯦꯟ ꯆꯠꯄ), and to add to the dignity of the high-coiled headgear with fringed ends permitted to them, they wear feathers of the Argus pheasant or of the Hume's pheasant, with blossoms in long trailing coils of the blue orchid (Vanda coerulea). The wrestlers wear the khamen chatpa loincloth and the curious head-dress, which has a portion twisted up in front. The costume of the polo (Meitei: ꯁꯒꯣꯜ ꯀꯥꯡꯖꯩ, romanized: Sagol Kangjei) players is more practical, and consists of a short jacket of dark velvet, worn even in hot weather, a loincloth, generally of white cotton, and quilted leggings of a stout and serviceable nature. The headgear is fastened in such a way as to protect the ears and side of the head from blows, and if not particularly picturesque, is at any rate of great use, for in the heat and fury of the game the players become excited, and some people think that if they cannot hit the ball, they may as well hit the man.

== Religious clothing ==
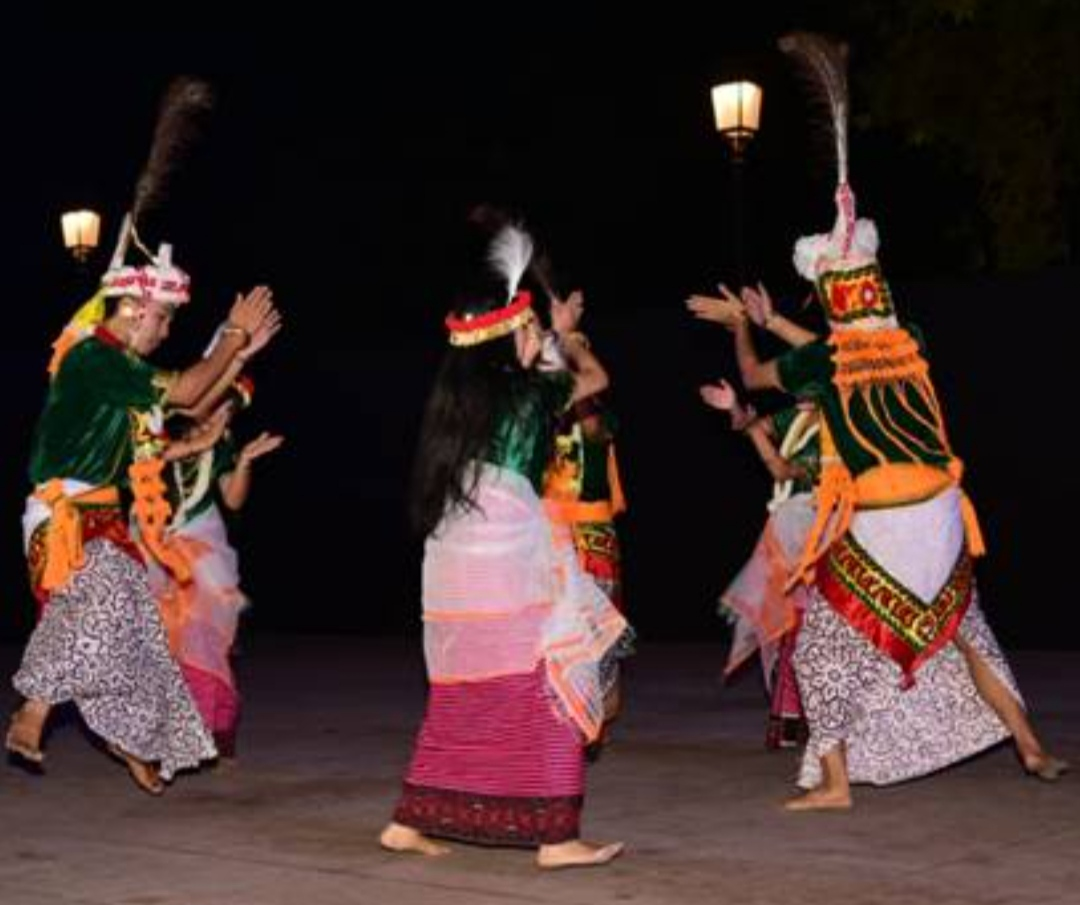
A group of men and women, wearing traditional Meitei dresses, while performing a classical Meitei dance (classical Manipuri dance), organized by the Sangeet Natak Akademi

The religious festivals, such as the Lai Haraoba (Meitei for 'making merry with the gods') (Meitei: ꯂꯥꯏ ꯍꯔꯥꯎꯕ), are occasions when the sumptuary laws are a little relaxed, and women don their gayest apparel without let or hindrance. Those who have been selected to take a part in one of the religious dances wear a handsome costume which is as modest as it is also beautiful, and which is sanctioned by long custom for these occasions. Old women make a living by hiring out these costumes, for they cost too much for ordinary purses to buy outright. Many children usually take roles of deities, by wearing handsome dresses with resplendent head-gears, adorned with peacocks' feathers and silver tinsels.

== National recognition ==
=== Government of India ===
Kokyet, a traditional Meitei men's headdress, was made one of the official uniforms for the officials working in the Indian Parliament.

=== Bollywood ===
In 2024, Urvashi Rautela became the first Bollywood fashion showstopper and actress to wear a Meitei traditional bridal dress, made from 24 carat gold.

In 2024, Bollywood actress Sunny Leone, wearing traditional Meitei women's clothes, including Phanek, walked as a fashion showstopper for Manipuri fashion brand, House of Ali, led by fashion designers, Alimuddin and Daya Oinam.

Manushi Chhillar, a Bollywood actress and a Miss World 2017 winner, wearing traditional Meitei women's dressings, walked as a fashion showstopper at the Manipur Fashion Extravaganza 2022 (MFE) in Imphal.

Bollywood actress Sushmita Sen, wearing traditional Meitei clothes, walked as a fashion showstopper for Manipuri designer Robert Naorem at the Sangai Festival 2022. Besides, in several other occasions, she is known for wearing traditional Meitei women's dressings, like Phanek and Innaphi.

Bollywood actress Kangana Ranaut is also known for wearing traditional Meitei women's dresses, like phanek and enaphi in several occasions.

== International recognition ==
Moirang Phee, Shaphee Lanphee and Wangkhei Phee were simultaneously given GI tag in 2011.

== Gallery ==
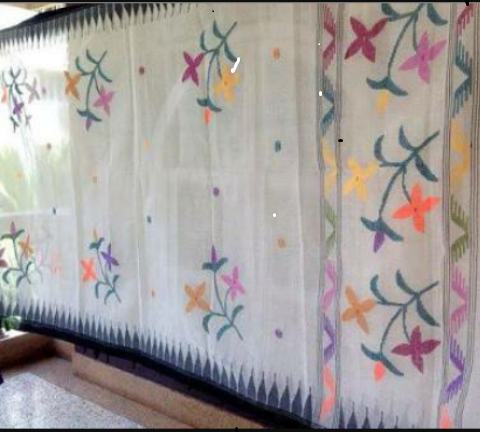

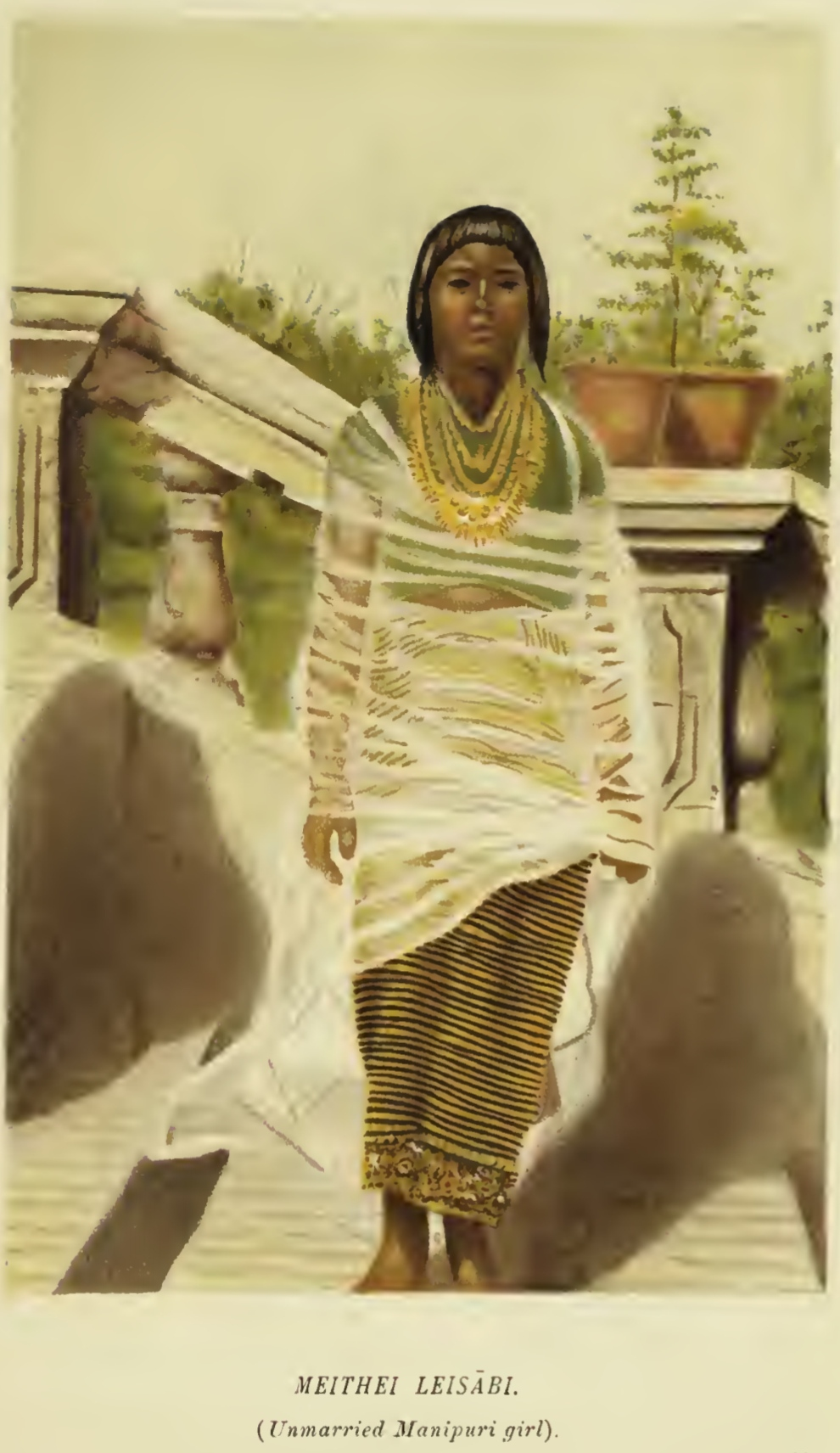

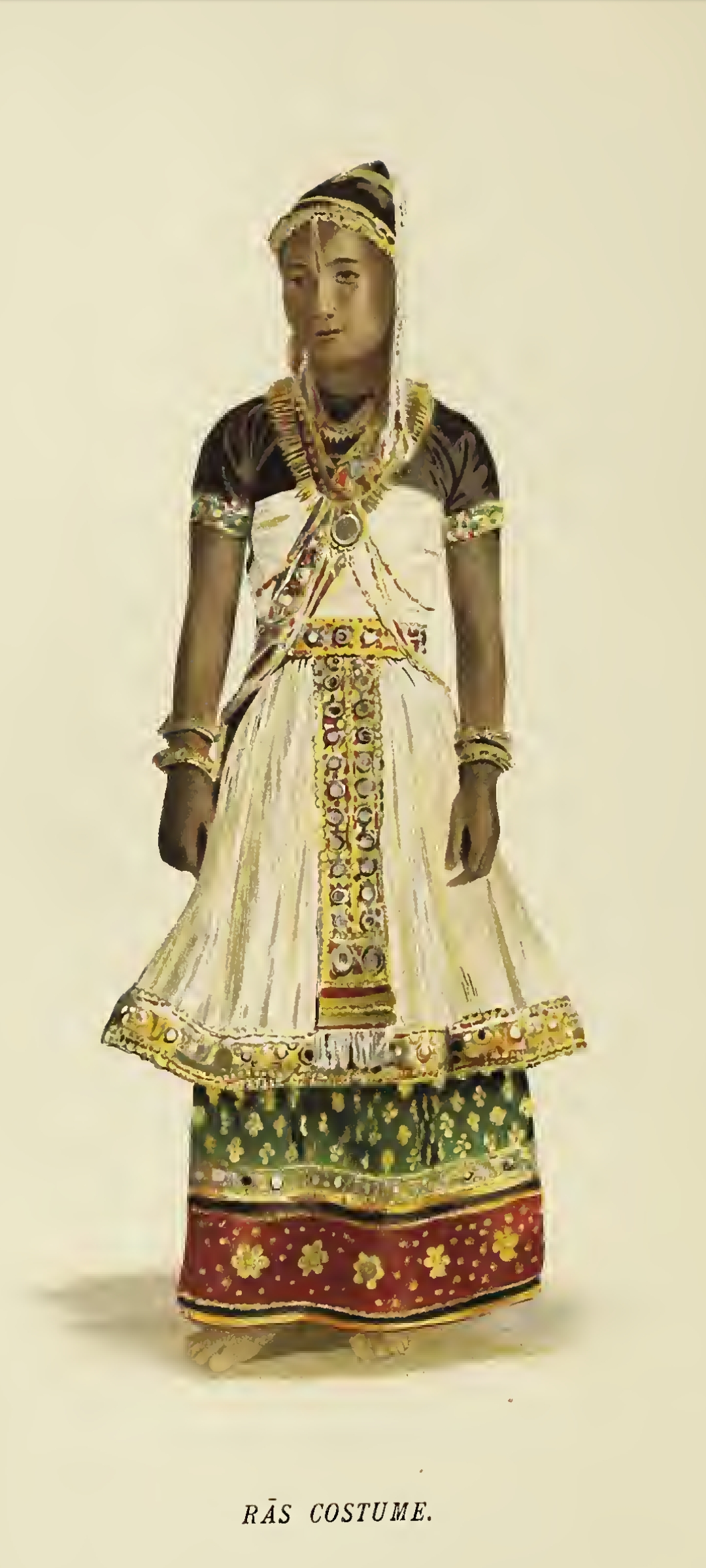

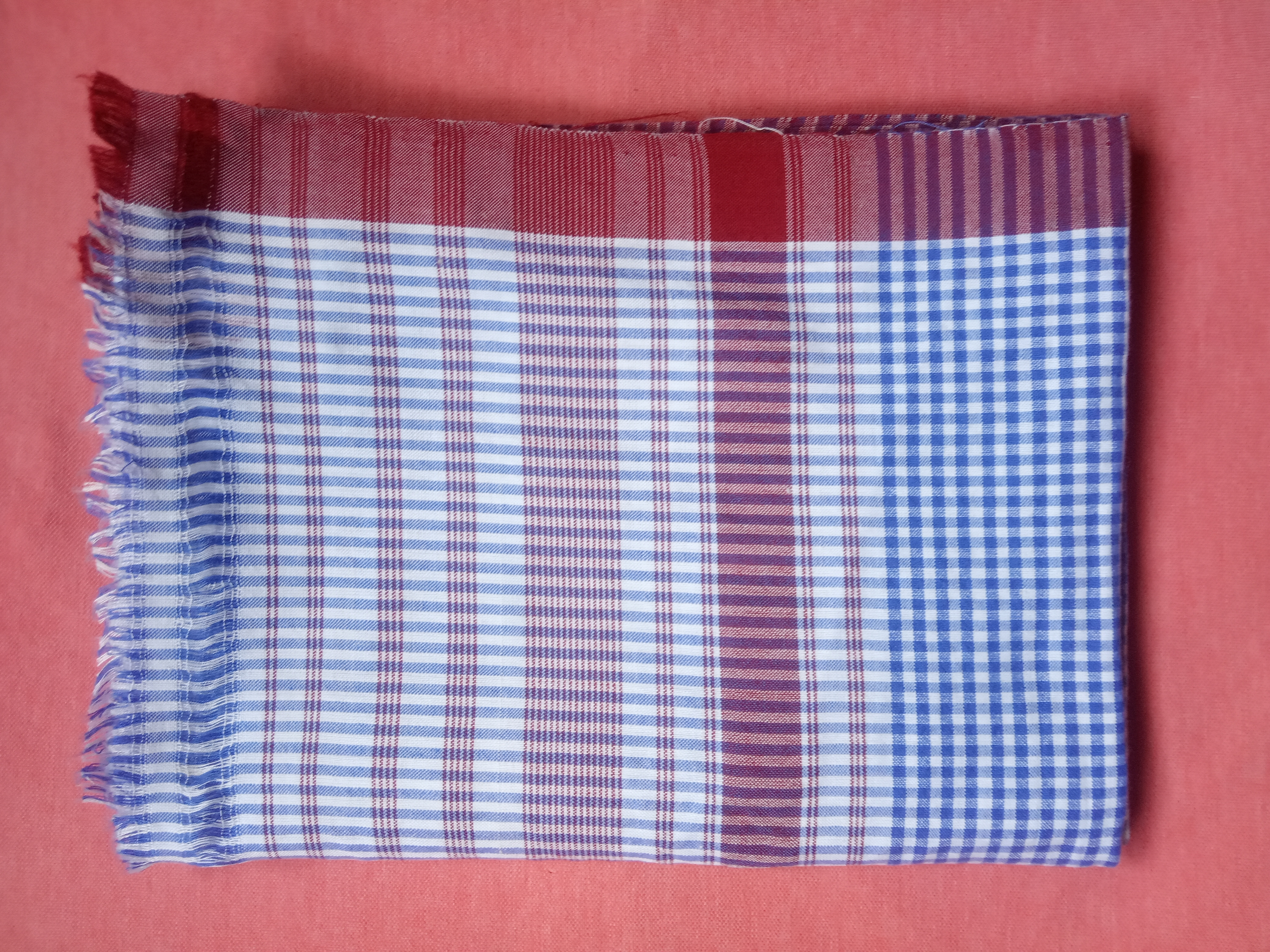

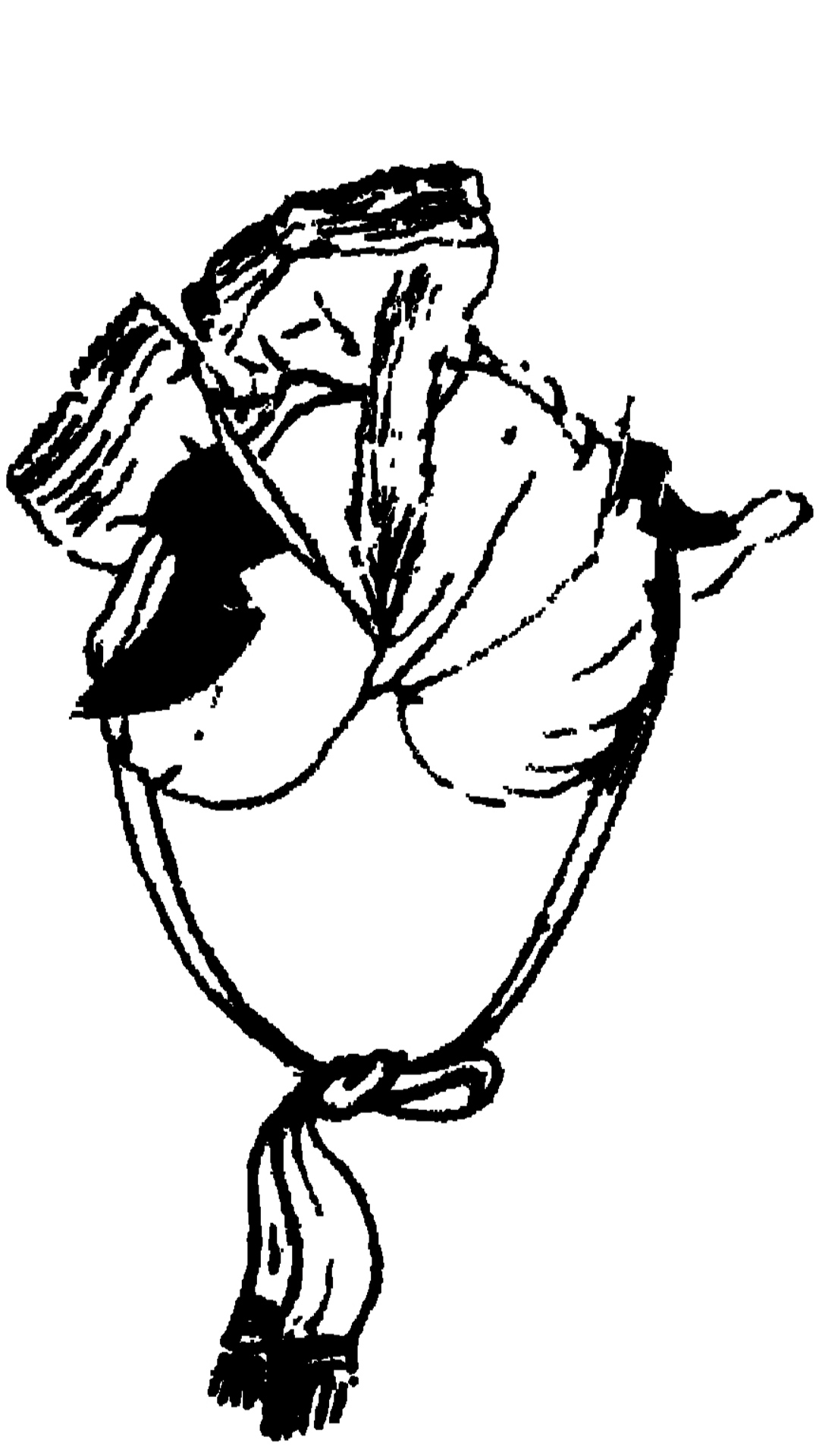

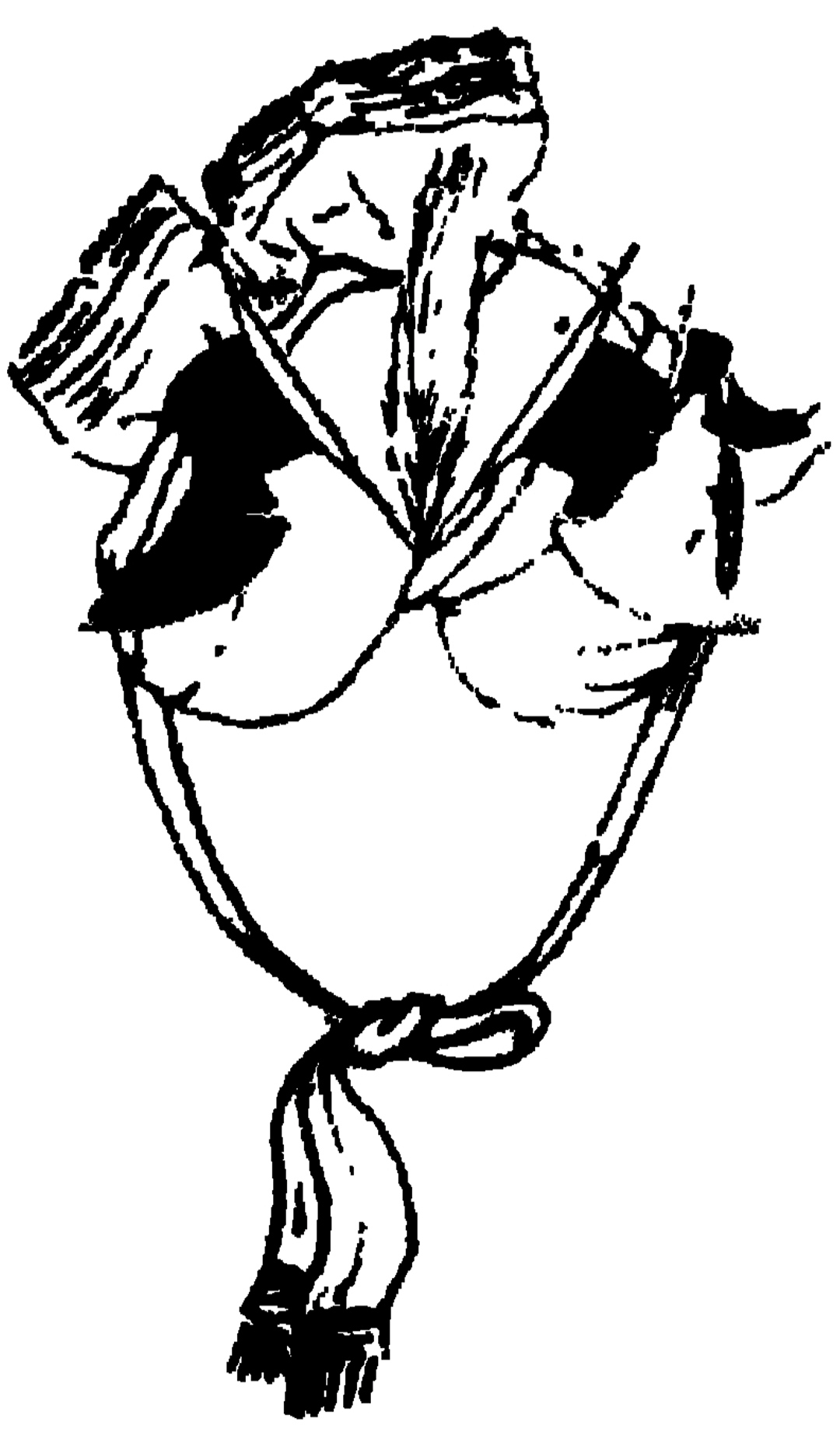

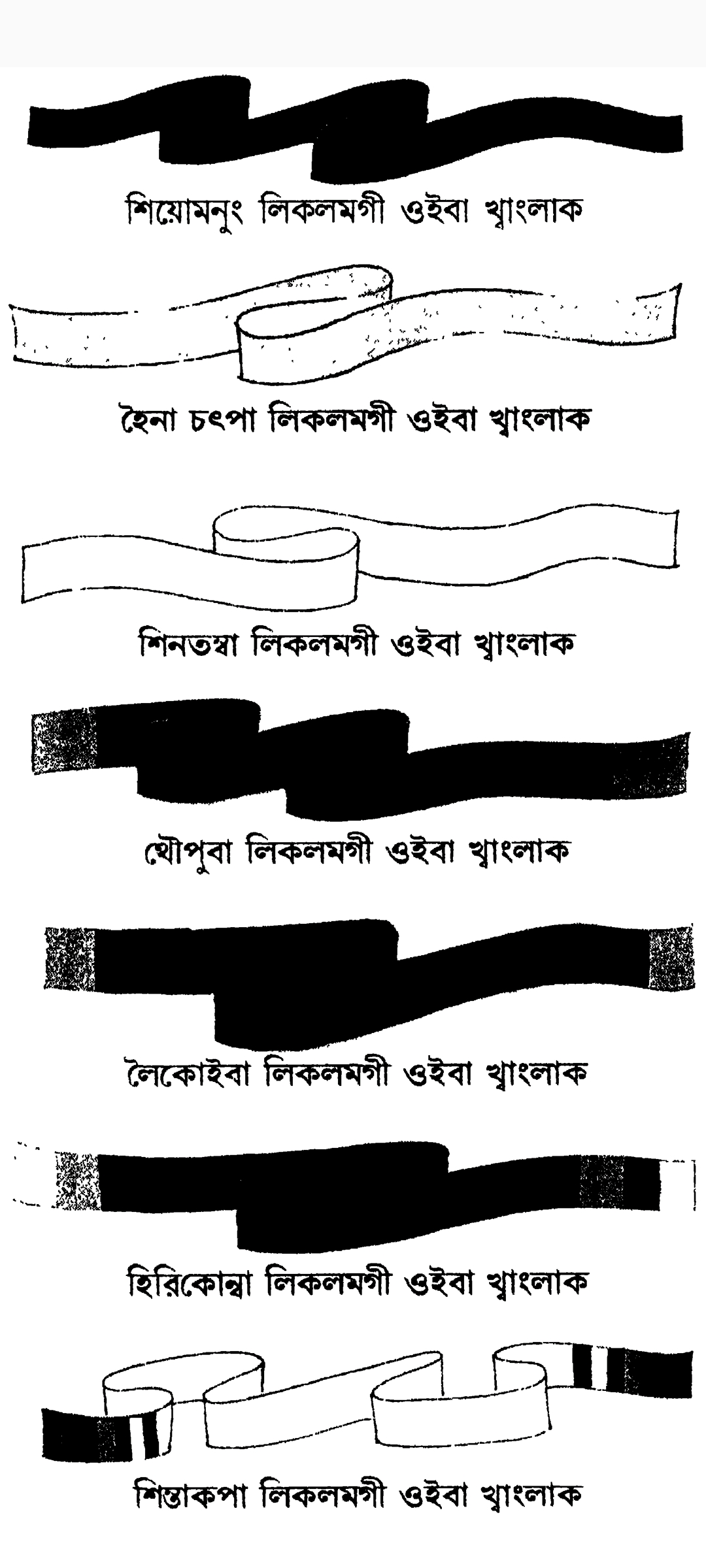

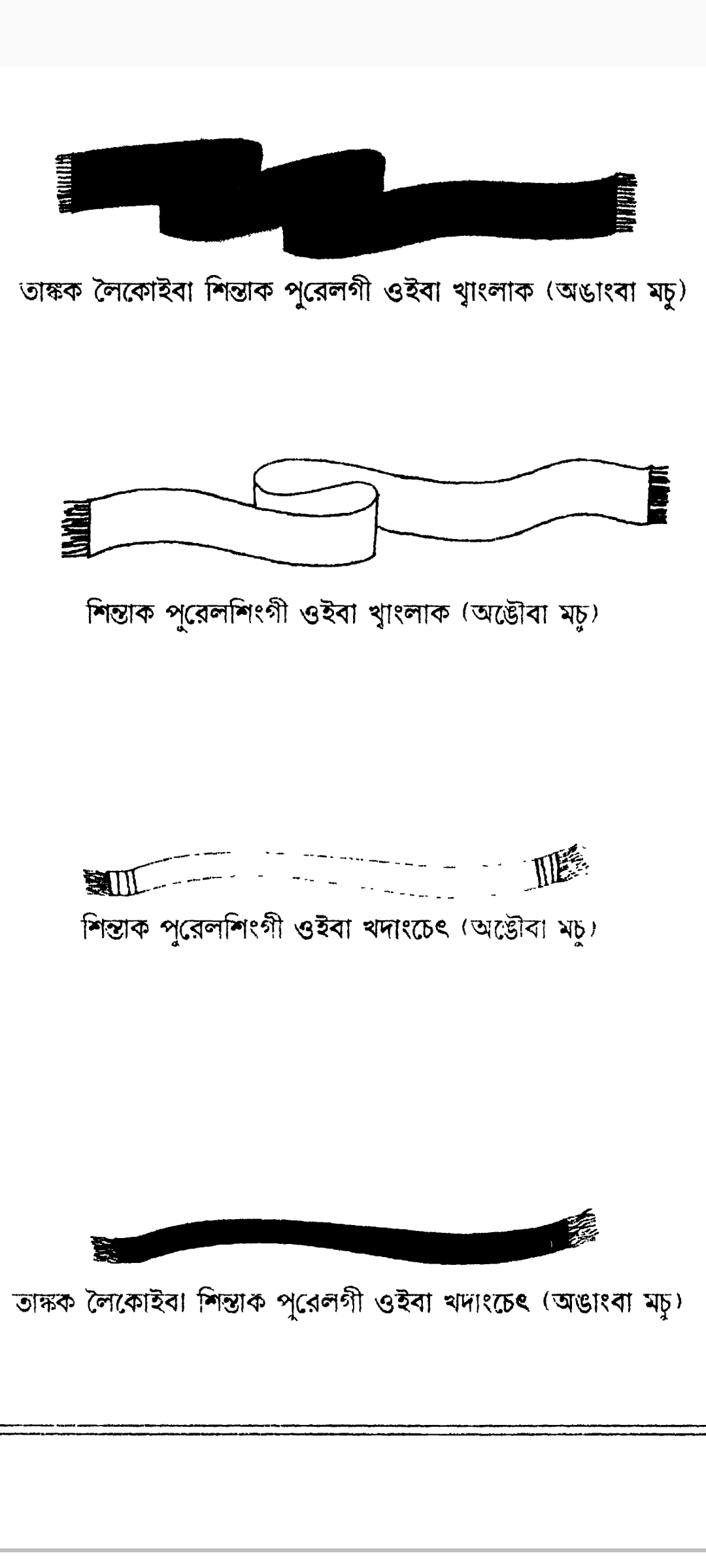

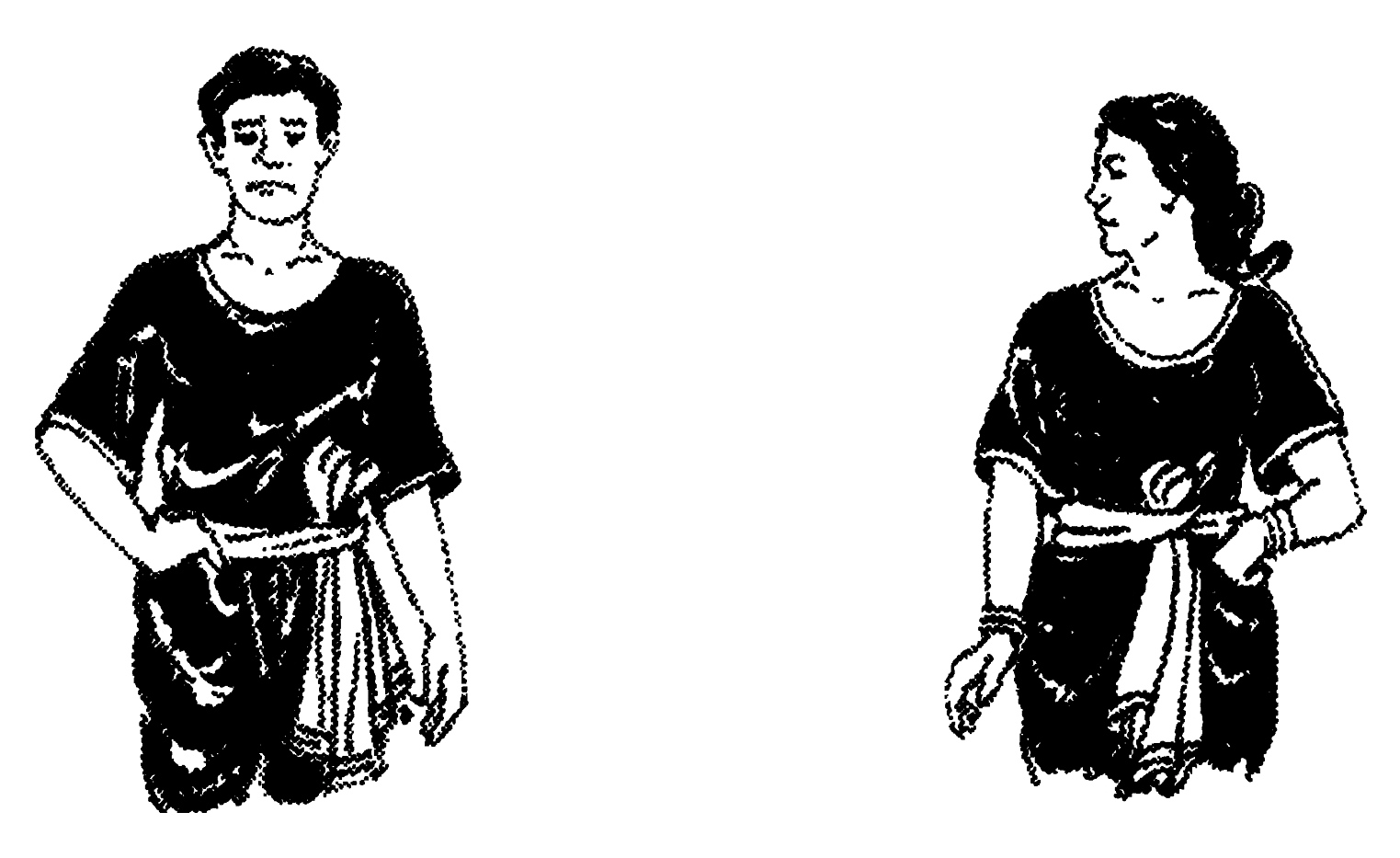

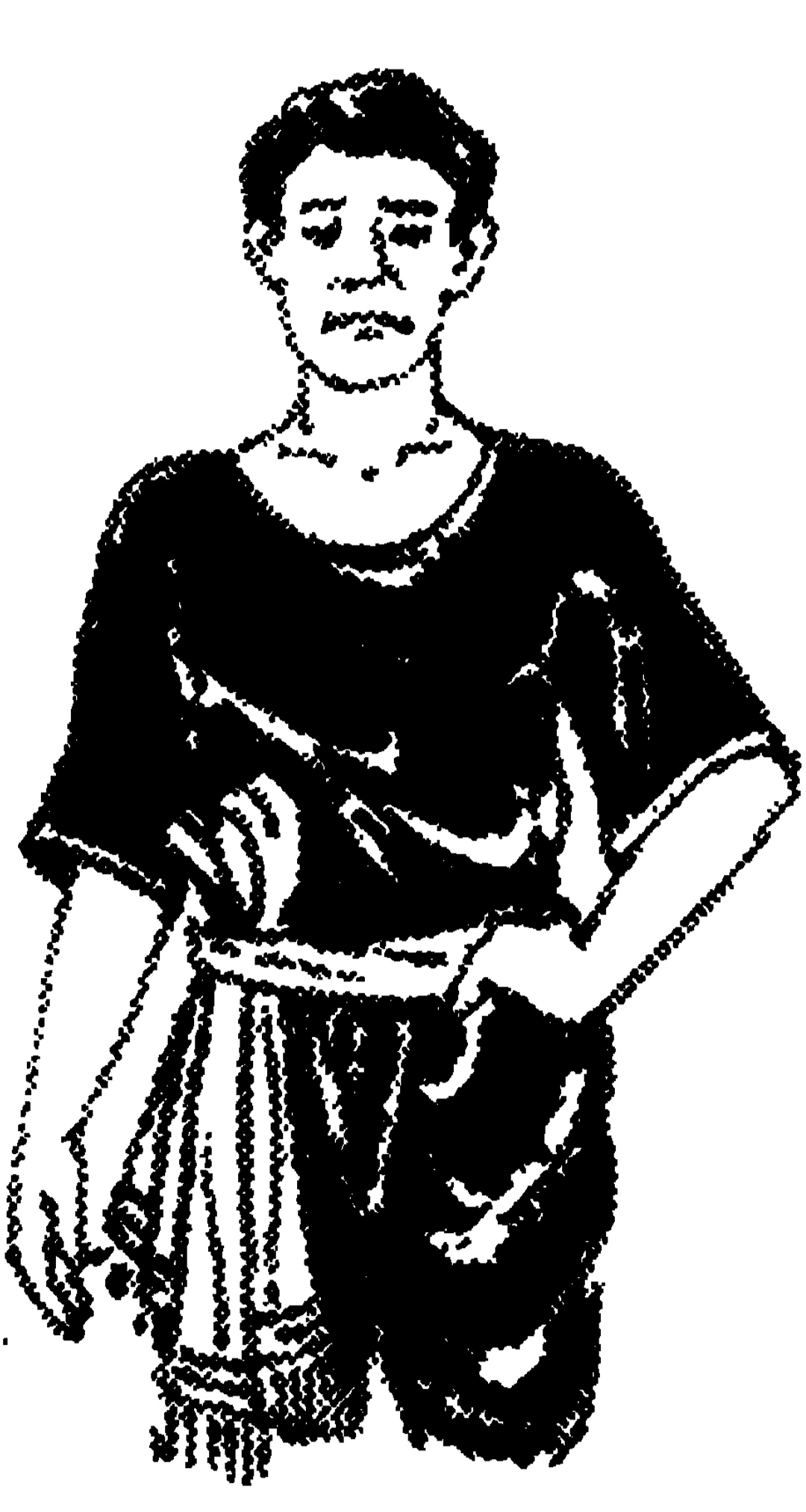

== See also ==
- Kajenglei
- Moirang phee
- Shaphee lanphee
- Wangkhei phee
- Meitei clothing in Myanmar
- Women in Meitei civilization
