= Leirum Phee =

Traditional Meitei clothing

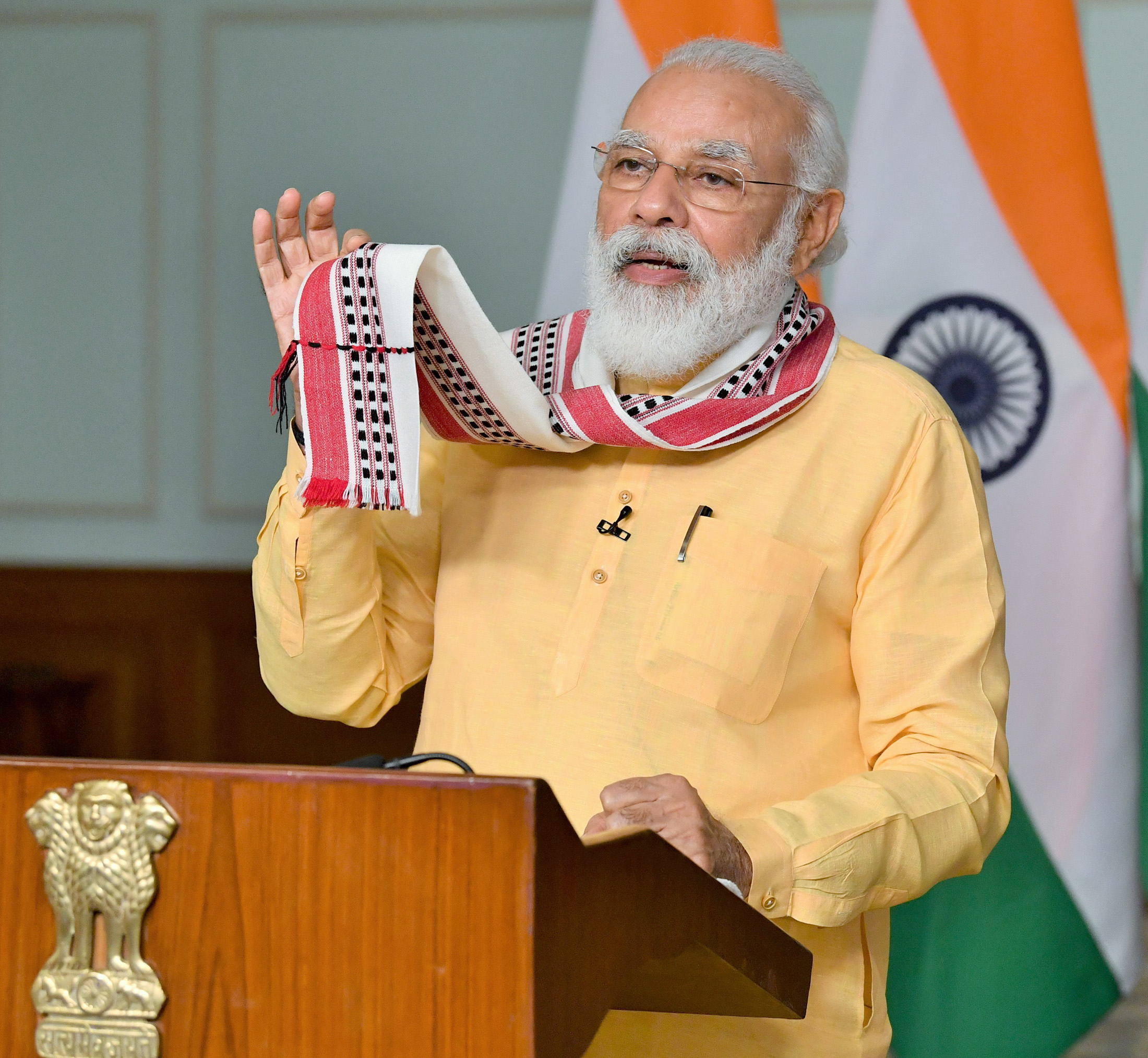
Indian prime minister Narendra Modi showcasing Leirum Phee as a scarf

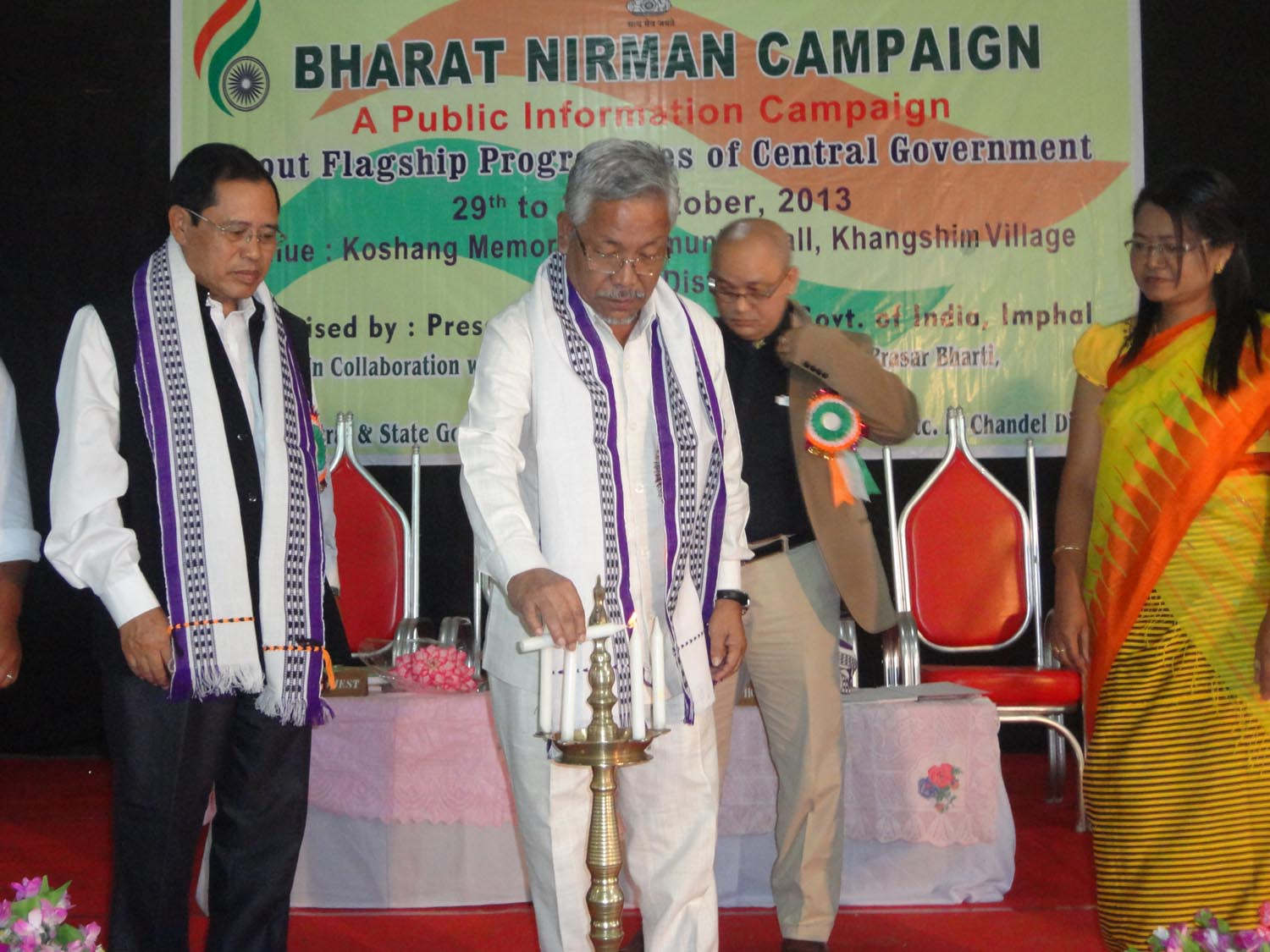
Key people of the Government of Manipur wearing Leirum Phee as scarfs in a public meeting

Leirum Phee (Meitei: ꯂꯩꯔꯨꯝ ꯐꯤ, /leiroom phee/), also spelled as Leirum Phi (/leiroom phi/), is a traditional Meitei clothing. It is a large, rough shawl traditionally used as a wrapper, featuring a unique woven design. It traces its origin to Ancient Kangleipak (early Manipur Kingdom). It is used as wedding gifts from parents to their daughters of the Meitei ethnicity. In the 21st century, it gains its popularity widespread across the entire India, thanks to the Indian prime minister Narendra Modi, who wears it in most of his public appearances, due to which the clothing is also known as Modi Gamusa or Modi Gamchha or Modi Gamcha. (Note: There are different types of Gamchas, belonging to different ethnic cultures of India, that Indian prime minister Narendra Modi wears in public.)

== History ==
The history of Leirum Phi dates back to the reign of King Khuyoi Tompok (c. 154 CE) of Ancient Kangleipak (early Manipur Kingdom). According to the Cheitharol Kumbaba, when Nongmoinu Ahongbi, an Angom princess, married King Khui Tompok, her parents gave her a Leirum cloth as a wedding gift. Since then, it has become a tradition to give Leirum cloth at Meitei weddings.

During King Loiyumba's reign (1078-1112 CE), 32 yumnak (Meitei surnames) were given the job of weaving textiles with special designs. The 11th yumnak, Shal Chiram, was assigned to weave the Leirum Phee.

== Design ==
Leirum Phi is typically made from cotton fabric with a design using three colors—black, red, and white. The black and red colors are proportionately arranged on the larger white fabric, representing the three guardians of the Universe: Mangang Luwang Khuman (consisting of deities related to Khuman, Mangang, and Luwang groups). These three deities are believed to be the ancestors of all Meitei clans (Yek Salai/Meitei confederacy).

== Traditional usages ==
Leirum Phi is an essential part of a Meitei wedding, included in the pham konba, a blessing ritual where the bride's family gives her ningol gi awunpot, which includes a bed. Many also believe that the motifs on the Leirum Phi represent guardianship.

== Piracy ==
Manipuri people have protested against the mass production of their traditional cloth, Leirum Phee, being made into 'Modi gamcha' in Barabanki, Uttar Pradesh, especially after Prime Minister Modi wore it as a face mask. The Directorate of Handloom and Textiles in Manipur asked the Ministry of Textiles to stop this production to protect local weavers. They also expressed anger over factory owners copying their traditional design for profit.

== See also ==
- Meitei clothing in Myanmar
