= Moirang phee =

Textile fabric

Moirang Phee
- Geographical indication
- Description: Textile fabric design
- Type: Cotton or silk
- Area: Manipur
- Country: India
- Registered: 19 December 2011
- Material: Cotton

Moirang Phee is a textile fabric which has a specific design called the "MoirangPheejin" which is woven sequentially on both longitudinal edges of the fabric and oriented towards the center of the cloth, with cotton or silk threads. It is a product which is protected under the GI registration and is made throughout the Indian state of Manipur. It was originally a product of Moirang village.

== Geographical indication ==
The fabric has been registered for protection under the Geographical indication of the Trade Related Intellectual Property Rights (TRIPS) agreement. It was registered as Moirang Phee under the Geographical Indications Act 1999 of the Government of India, with registration confirmed by the Controller General of Patents Designs and Trademarks under Class – 25 – Clothing vide application number 373 dated 19 December 2011, and also for Wangkhei Phee (GI no.372) and Shaphee Lanphee (GI no.371). The Government of Manipur was expected to register 1,000 weavers in respect of Moirang Phee within six months from the date of registration as per decision of the Consultative Committee meeting.

== History ==
Moirang village where the Moirang Phee was initially made is a historical location in the Bishnupur District. Mythologically the village is linked to the mythical "Khamba" of the "Moirang Kangleirol" epic. Historically, according to the manuscript titled Loiyumba Silyen, King Meidingu Loiyumba (1074–1122) assigned the task of weaving of ‘Yarongphi (local name for Moirang Phee) to Moirang villagers It was made by the villagers to gift the designed fabric as a tribute to the Meitei rulers, the then royal family of Manipur. It is also the historic place where INA flag was unfurled in 1944. The village is located 46 kilometres (29 mi) from Imphal, the capital of Manipur.

== Details of the product ==
The "MoirangPheejin" design, known in local language as Yarongphi ('ya' means "tooth", 'rong' means "long" and 'longba' means "pronged"), which is weaved over the Moirang Phee fabric is stated to represent the thin and pointed teeth of the "Pakhangba", the Pythonic god in Manipur mythology. This motif, arranged in varying steps, on the longitudinal border of the main fabric woven during the first stage, has a sharp edge at the top and is woven sequentially to give an aesthetic appearance to the fabric. The triangular shaped design elongates on odd numbers of steps (such as 3, 5, 9, 11 and so forth) towards the center of the cloth on which it is woven, and is parallel to weft threads. This design is made to suit the fabric such as a sari, stole, sarong, school uniforms, lungi, skirts and half sari. The count of the weft of cotton or silk yarn used varies from 2/40S to 2/80S. The fabric is woven by women, and is used by them during marriages and other festivities.

The fibre used to make the yarn is a derivative of “Lashing” (Cotton ball) and “Kabrang” (Mulberry cocoon). It is also extracted from the bark of the tree species, locally called as "Santhak" (Urtica sp.). The local fibre is spun into threads and then dyed using plants and bark. The dyed yarn is subject to sizing by applying starch made of rice, and then stretched across using a bamboo rod, which is followed by winding into bobbin.

The fabric woven in two stages is made using loin loom or throw shuttle and fly shuttle loom; the throw shuttle loom is considered the most suitable.

According to the GI registration stipulations for the fabric, an inspection agency, comprising nine officials from the government, societies and the craftsmen, has been instituted to check the quality of the product made by weavers.
