= Wangkhei phee =

White cotton textile fabric

Wangkhei Phee
- Geographical indication
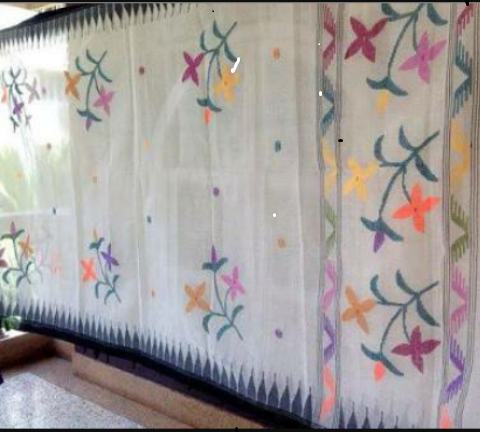
- Description: Textile fabric
- Type: White cotton
- Area: Manipur
- Country: India
- Registered: 19 December 2011
- Material: White cotton

Wangkhei Phee is a textile fabric made of white cotton. It is a product which is protected under the GI registration and is made throughout the Indian state of Manipur and is woven by women. The fabric is transparent, has many designs on its body, and is popularly worn by women of Manipur for marriage ceremonies and other festive occasions.

== Geographical indication ==
The fabric has been registered for protection under the Geographical indication of the Trade Related Intellectual Property Rights (TRIPS) agreement. It was registered as Wangkhei Phee under the Geographical Indications Act 1999 of the Government of India, with registration confirmed by the Controller General of Patents Designs and Trademarks under Class – 25 – Clothing vide application number 372 dated 19 December 2011, and also for Moirang Phee (GI no.373) and Shaphee Lanphee (GI no.371), which are all woven by women of Manipur. The Government of Manipur was expected to register 5,000 weavers in respect of Wangkhei Phee within six months from the date of GI registration as per decision of the Consultative Committee meeting.

== History ==
The fabric was originally made in muslin cloth for use by the royal family of Manipur. The weavers were then stationed at the Wangkhei Colony, close to the palace but is now made at many places in Manipur.

== Product details ==
The Wangkhei Phee is made with very fine white cotton yarn with a closely woven texture. The interlacing of cotton weft and warp is woven by women, in series and widely spaced from each other, that makes the fabric "fully transparent". Patches are incorporated by weaving with standard designs; the designs are called Kheiroithek, ThangjingTangkhai, KabokChaiba, and several others, and all have Moirang Phee design on both of its longitudinal borders. Known as a "luxurious" cloth, it is a popular attire used by women during marriage ceremonies and festivals.

The fibre used for making the yarn is derived from "Lashing" (Cotton ball) and "Kabrang" (Mulberry cocoon). It is also extracted from the bark of the tree species locally known as "Santhak" (Urtica sp.). The local fibre is spun into threads and then dyed using the extracts of plants, bark, leaves, and flowers. The dyed yarn is subject to sizing through the application of a rice-based starch, following by stretching with the help of a bamboo stick, and then wound onto the bobbins and pirns.

The type of yarn in the fabric used is fine cotton. The thread in the warp has counts of 80S and 100S cotton while the weft has thread of count 2/80S. The extra weft used is of 2/80S mercerized.

The weaving process involves two methods based on use of shuttles: fly shuttle loom and throw shuttle loom. In the first type it is made as a complete fabric in a single piece. In the second method, the fabric is made in two pieces and then joined by stitching to make it a full fabric. Additional motifs are woven in by hand. The fabric is "porous, airy, see-through and thin", making it suitable for luxury items for women such as chadors and saris, and skirts and school uniforms for girls.

Following the GI registration of the fabric, an inspection agency has been constituted for quality control of the product made by weavers.
