= Shaphee lanphee =

Shaphee Lanphee
- Geographical indication
- Description: Textile fabric
- Area: Manipur
- Country: India
- Registered: 19 December 2011
- Material: Cotton or silk

Shaphee Lanphee is a traditional textile fabric woven and embroidered, usually as a shawl, with embroidered motifs with cotton threads generally by Meitei women of Manipur. The fabric was, in the past, presented as a gift of honour (Mana Phee) to the soldiers for their bravery in a successful war, and to the praiseworthy chiefs of the indigenous peoples (e.g., Tangkhul, Meitei, Rongmei, etc.) of Manipur by the king of Manipur. It is a product which is protected under the GI registration and is now made throughout the Indian state of Manipur.

== Geographical indication ==
The fabric has been registered for protection under the Geographical indication of the Trade Related Aspects of Intellectual Property Rights (TRIPS) agreement. It was registered as "Shaphee Lanphee" under the Geographical Indications Act 1999 of the Government of India, with registration confirmed by the Controller General of Patents Designs and Trademarks under Class – 25 – Clothing vide application number 371 dated 19 December 2011, and also for Wangkhei Phee (GI no.372) and Moirang Phee (GI no.373). The Government of Manipur was expected to register 1,000 weavers in respect of manufacturing Shaphee Lanphee within six months from the date of registration as per decision of the Consultative Committee meeting.

== History ==
The literal meaning of the fabric 'Shaphee' is "the fabric of animal and war". It is exclusivity a product of Khoisnam lineage. It is said that the king saw a man of Khoisnam clan wearing this Shaphee Lanphee and riding a horse. The king then adopted it as a form of honouring brave Naga Chiefs of Manipur. According to manuscript titled Loiyumba Silyen, King Loiyumba (1074–1122 AD) authorised this product to be woven by the Khoisnam family. The product was revived in the 20th century with the efforts of Maisnam Lalini Devi, a weaver from Wangkhei Yonglan, her sister Maisnam Anita and their mother Keinahanbi who had both won the state award in 1992 for promoting this product. Nalini also won the Master Crafts Person award in 2009 for promoting this craft.

== Details of product ==
Shaphee Lamphee embroidery is done over a black coloured cloth with red border. The motifs embroidered on the fabric consists of several designs, and some of the common designs adopted are: of animals such as "shamu" (elephant), "shagol" (horse), "iroichi" (buffalo horn), "wahong" (peacock), and "Nga" (fish); planets such as "numit" (sun), tha (moon); Thawanmichak (star) ; and also phantup (magical seat, ta (spear) – these designs are done in a set pattern and sequence of operation. The embroidery is done by hand using needle and yarns of cotton. It has a width of 110–132 cm and length of 225–230 cm and generally weighs 1854 grams. The yarn used are 2/20S cotton and 2/34S acrylic with wrap made with 2/20S cotton and weft woven from 2/20S cotton. The yarn used in embroidery is 2/20S cotton, mercerized and 2/40S.

The fabric is revered for its religious significance in view of the motifs crafted on them. The core part of the fabric has red colour representing sun, the white strips at both borders denoting the cosmos of sky and the stars, and symbols of moon and sun assigned to mother and father. Some of these motifs are indicative of relationship between the celestial bodies and the Meitei King; particularly the magical seat and the elephant linked to the royalty and the spear heads and the fishes indicative of the mythology of king Naothingkhong (663–763 AD).

The yarn used to make the fabric is a derivative of "Lashing" (Cotton ball) and "Kabrang" (Mulberry cocoon). These are also extracted from the bark of the tree species locally known as "Santhak" (Urtica sp.). The local fibre is then made into threads by spinning and then dyed using plants and bark. The dyed yarn is subject to sizing by applying starch made of rice, and then stretched across using a bamboo rod which is followed by winding into bobbin.

Weaving of the fabric is done on a "Loin and Frame Loom" and motifs are made with needle work without frame using Manipuri cotton or occasionally silk threads.

In order to exercise quality control of the product made by weavers, following the GI registration of the fabric, an inspection agency has been instituted with nine members drawn from the government departments, societies and master craftsmen.
