= Kokyet =

Traditional Meitei men's headdress

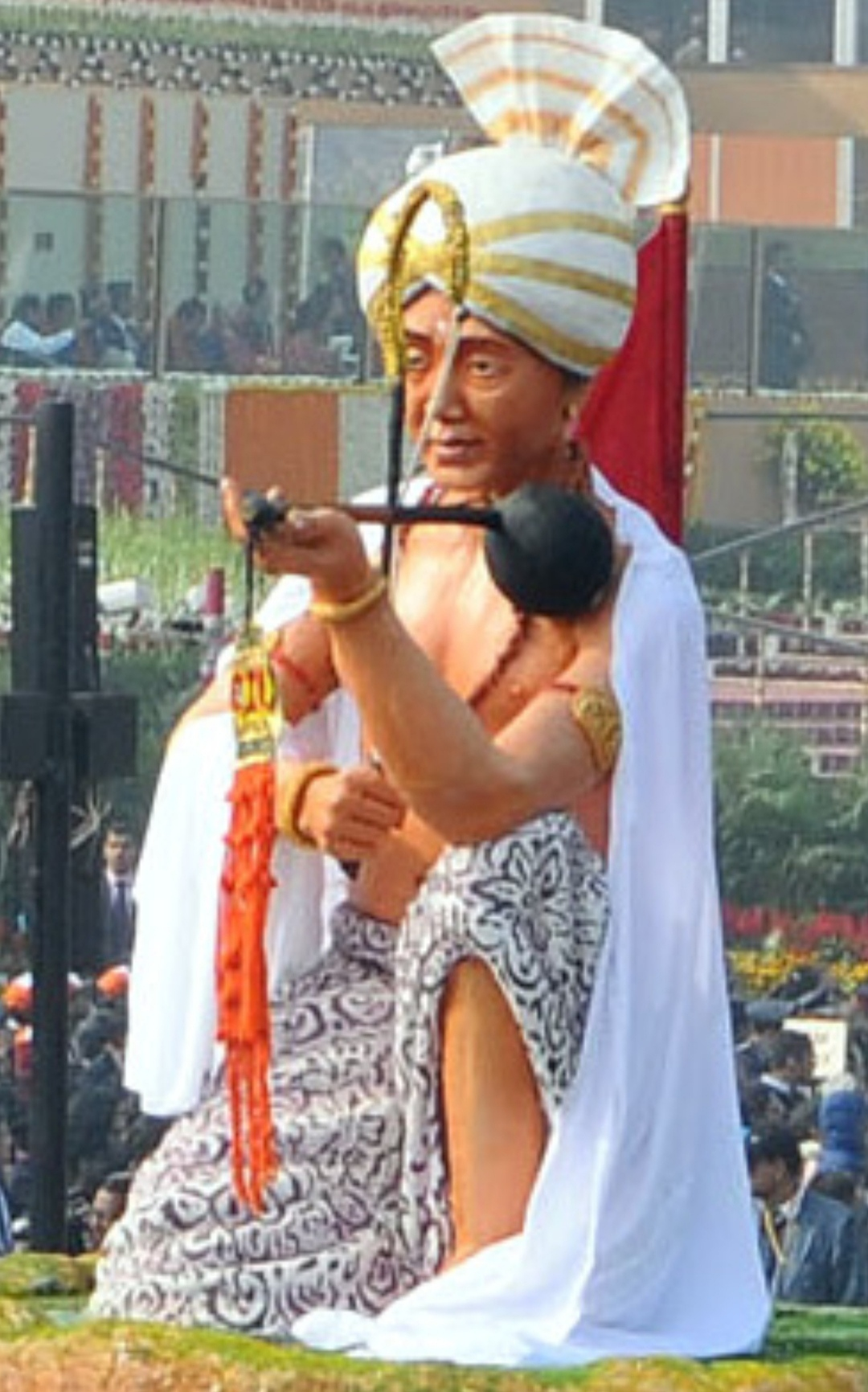
- A motif of a Maiba (Meitei for 'priest') wearing a Kokyet, while playing a Pena (musical instrument), showcased in the Republic Day of India, in New Delhi
- Year: 33 CE
- Type: headdress (headgear)
- On display at: in many occasions and places, including the Indian Parliament

Kokyet (Meitei: ꯀꯣꯛꯌꯦꯠ), (Note: "Kok" means head and "Yet" means "to wrap around" in Meitei language) sometimes also spelled as Koyet, Koyyet, Koiyet, is a traditional Meitei men's headdress. It is made in twelve distinct designs. It is used in different Meitei cultural ceremonies, festivals, occasions, etc. It is used by both the common people as well as the royal people. Its design is derived from the two horns of ancient Meitei deity Pakhangba, who could transfigure into many different divine forms. It is also the sacred protective symbolic representation of Sidaba of traditional Meitei religion (Sanamahism).

== Origin ==
The existence of Kokyet (Meitei: ꯀꯣꯛꯌꯦꯠ) dates back to the era of Meitei king Nongda Lairen Pakhangba (c. 33 CE) in Ancient Kangleipak (early Manipur). He used it as Kokyet Pheiyet (Meitei: ꯀꯣꯛꯌꯦꯠ ꯐꯩꯌꯦꯠ), one of the designs of the costume.

== In Indian Parliament ==
Since 2023, the Kokyet is used as a uniform item for the marshals of the Indian Parliament (both Lok Sabha and Rajya Sabha), as chosen by the Union Government of India. The Kokyet which is used as a uniform is designed by Yumnam Bhumeshwor Singh (Yuva Awardee Sangeet Natak Akademi New Delhi, Government of India) a Nata Sankirtana artiste, Music Composer and Choreographer. The newly designed Kokyet drew inspiration from the "Salai Kokyet Achouba" (Meitei: ꯁꯂꯥꯏ ꯇꯔꯦꯠ ꯀꯣꯛꯌꯦꯠ), possessing seven colours representing seven Meitei clans, combined with another Meitei traditional handicraft "Lamthang Khullak" (Meitei: ꯂꯝꯊꯥꯡ ꯈꯨꯜꯂꯛ).

Upon the reception of the Meitei traditional dress in the national level, Sunzu Bachaspatimaym, the then secretary of Manipur State Film Development Society (MSFDS), commented:

I have mixed emotions at the news. While I'm thrilled to know that our cultural heritage is being recognised and has duly found a space in the Parliament, I'm also sceptical as Meitei fabric heritage is steeped in hierarchy.

== Gallery ==
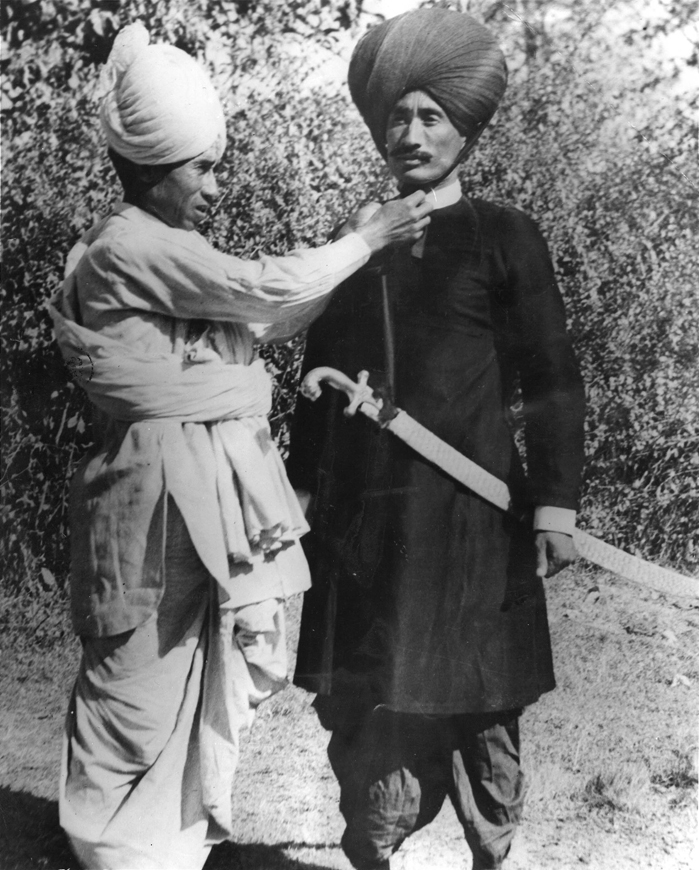
In royal court

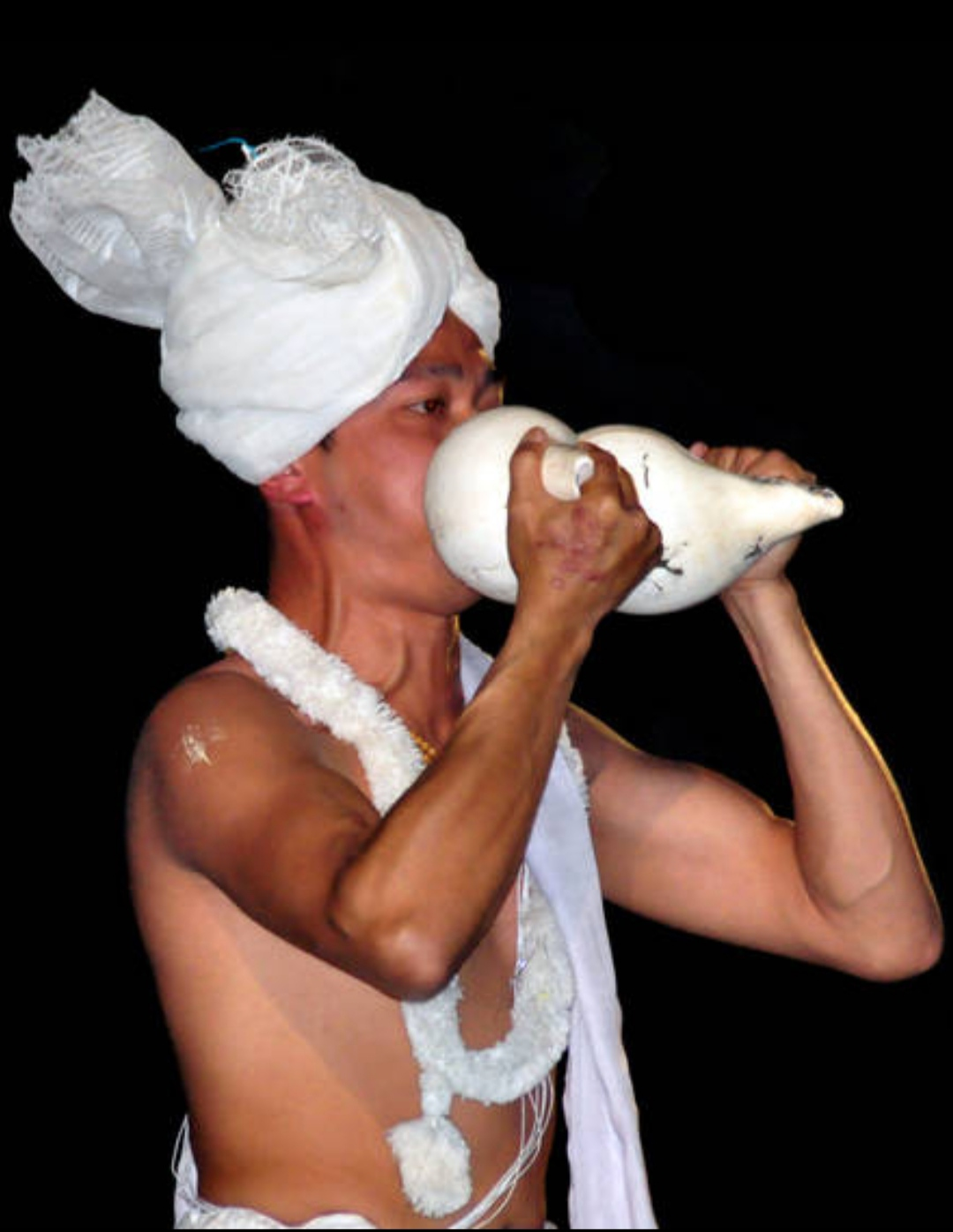
In religious ceremonies

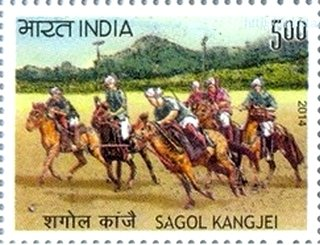
In sports

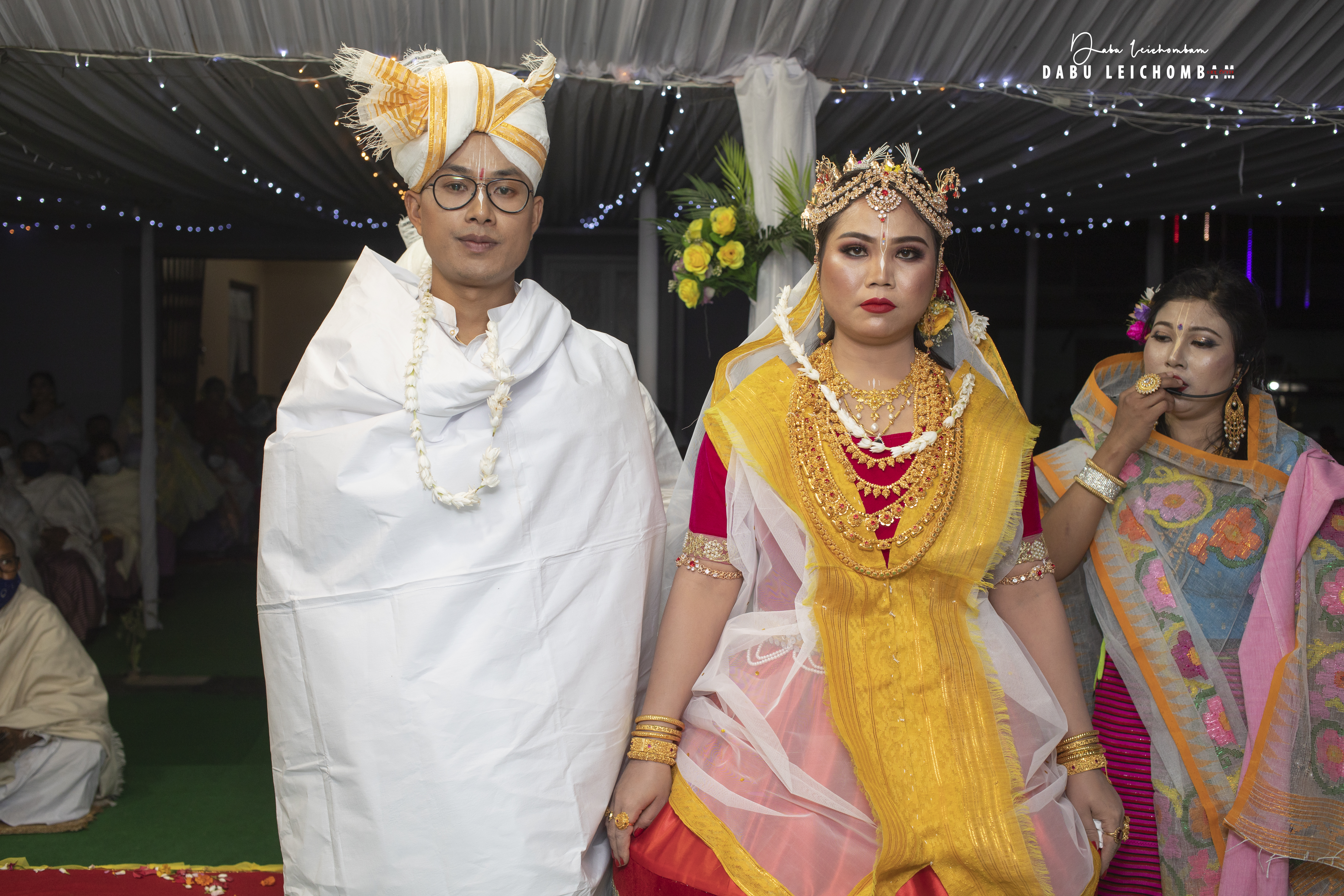
In wedding

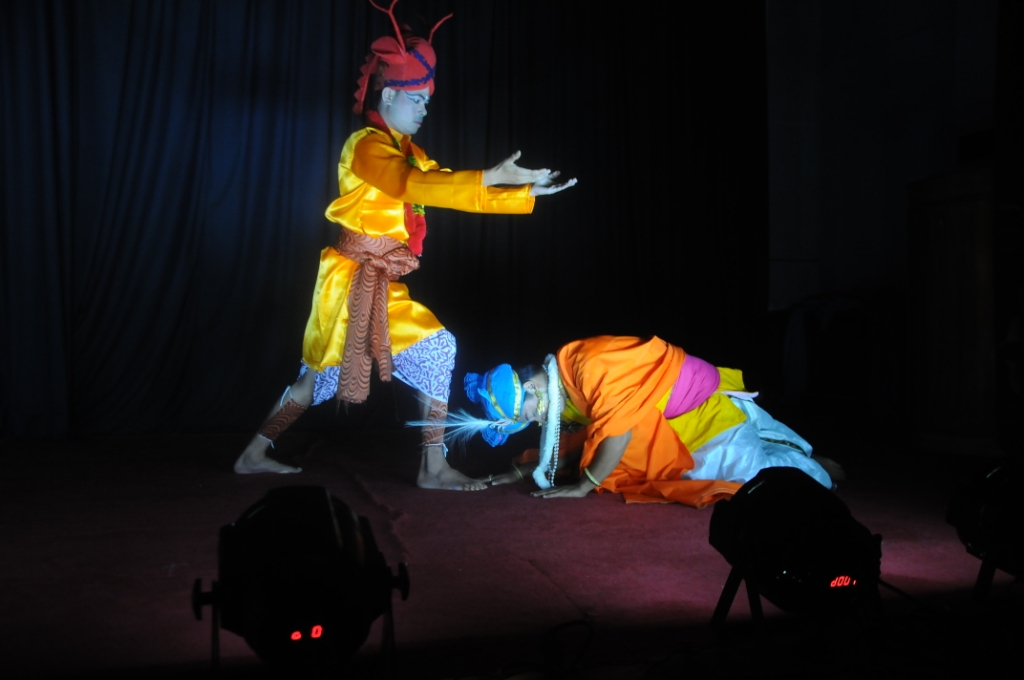
In theatrical performance

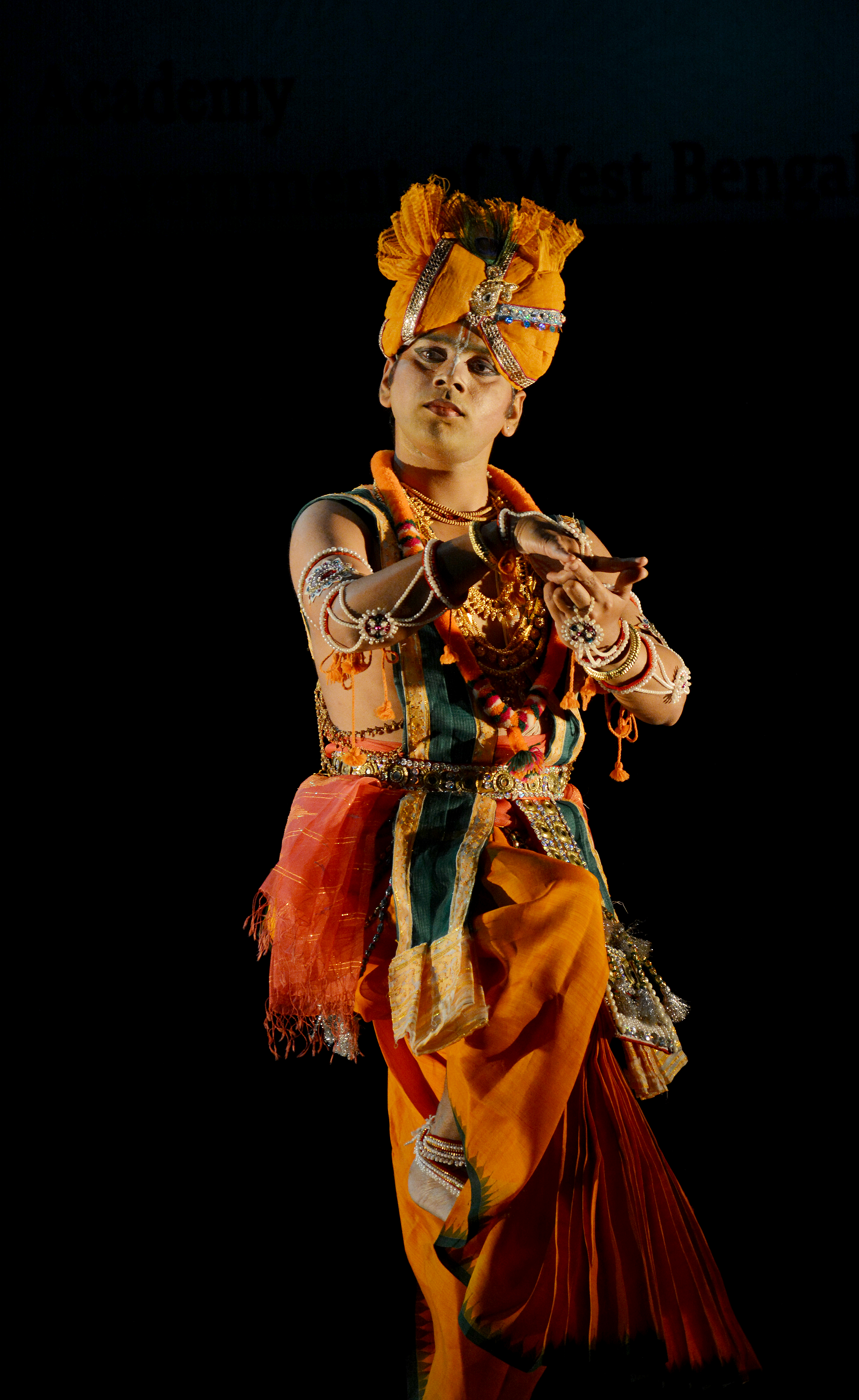
In dance

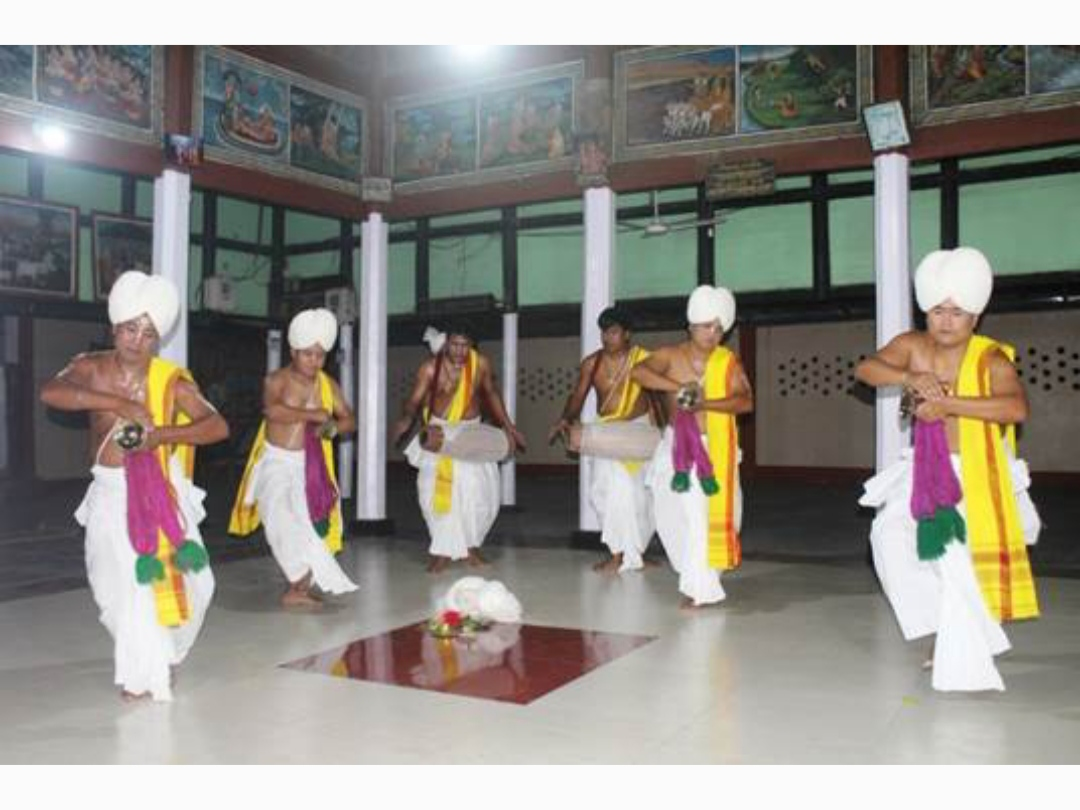
In group musical performances

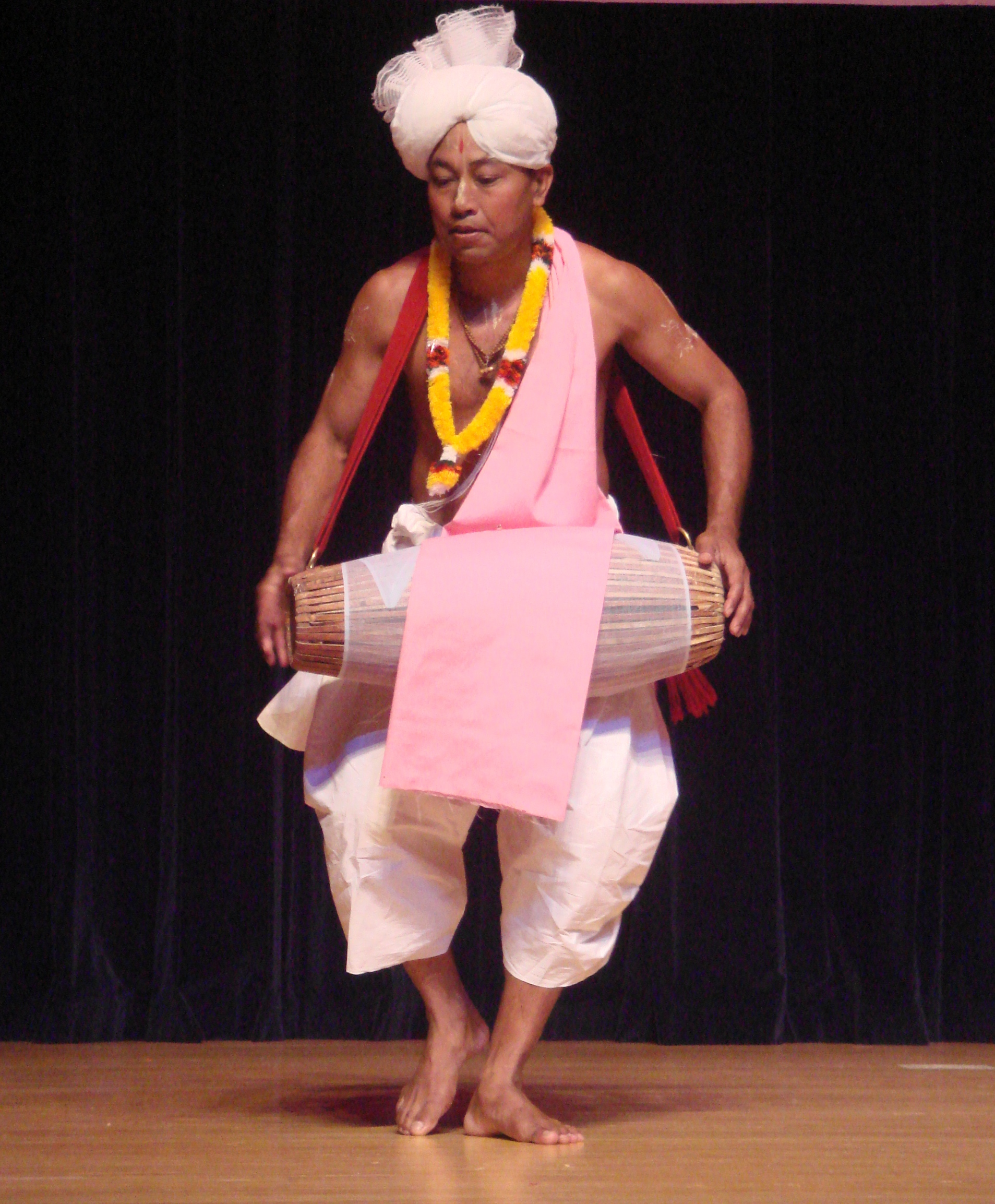
In solo musical performance

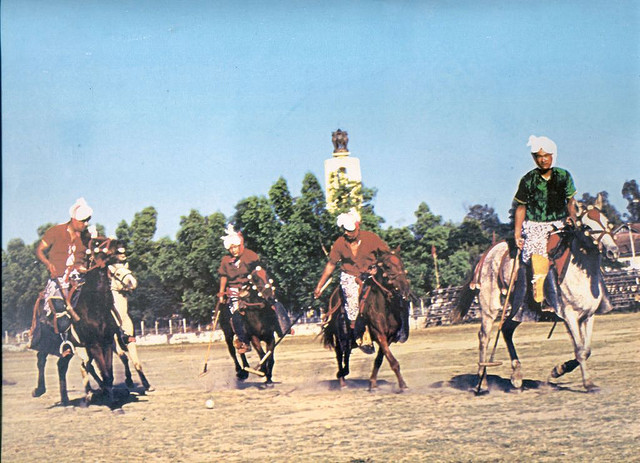
In horse riding events

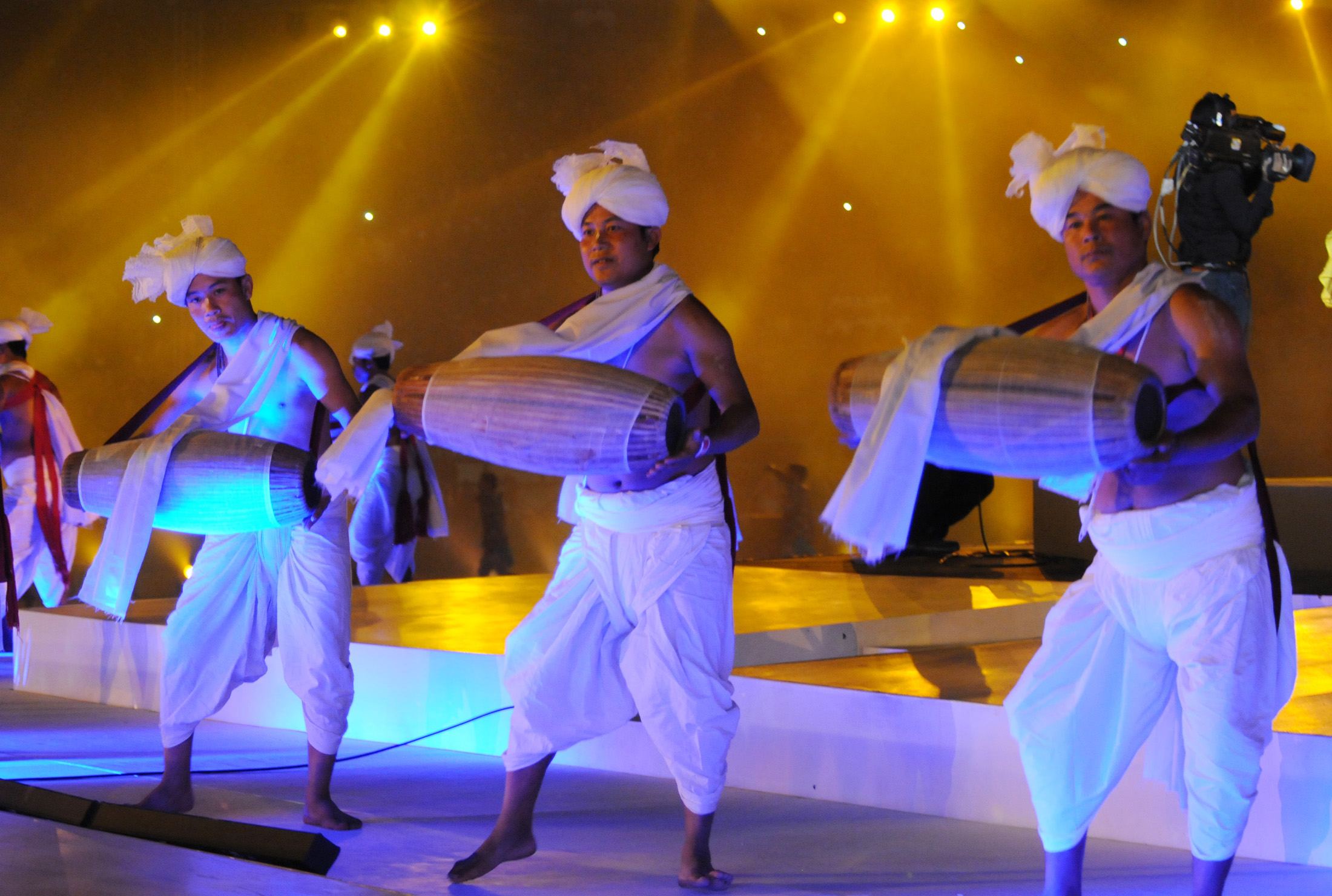
In stage performances

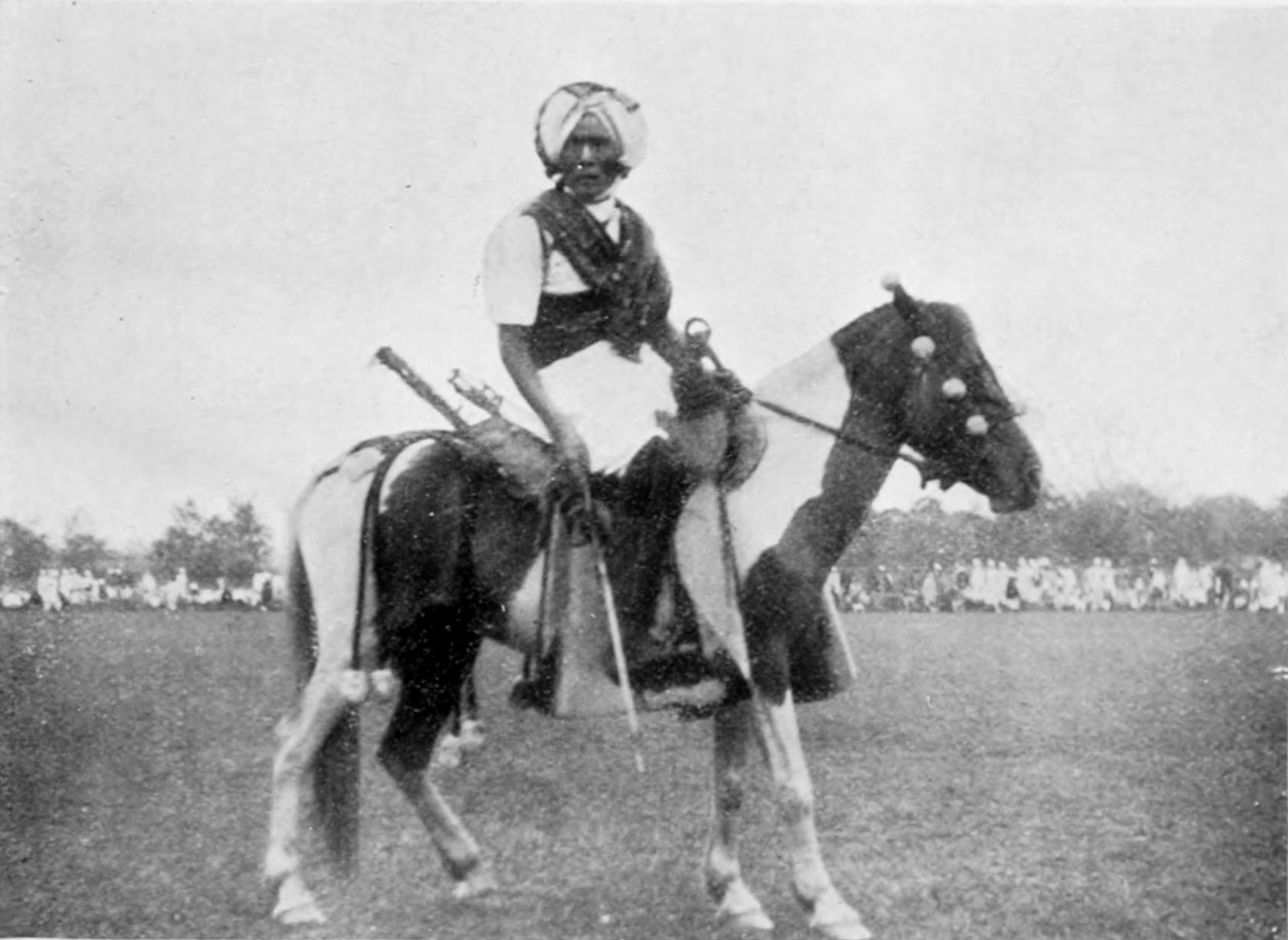
In Arambai dart throwing war tactical events

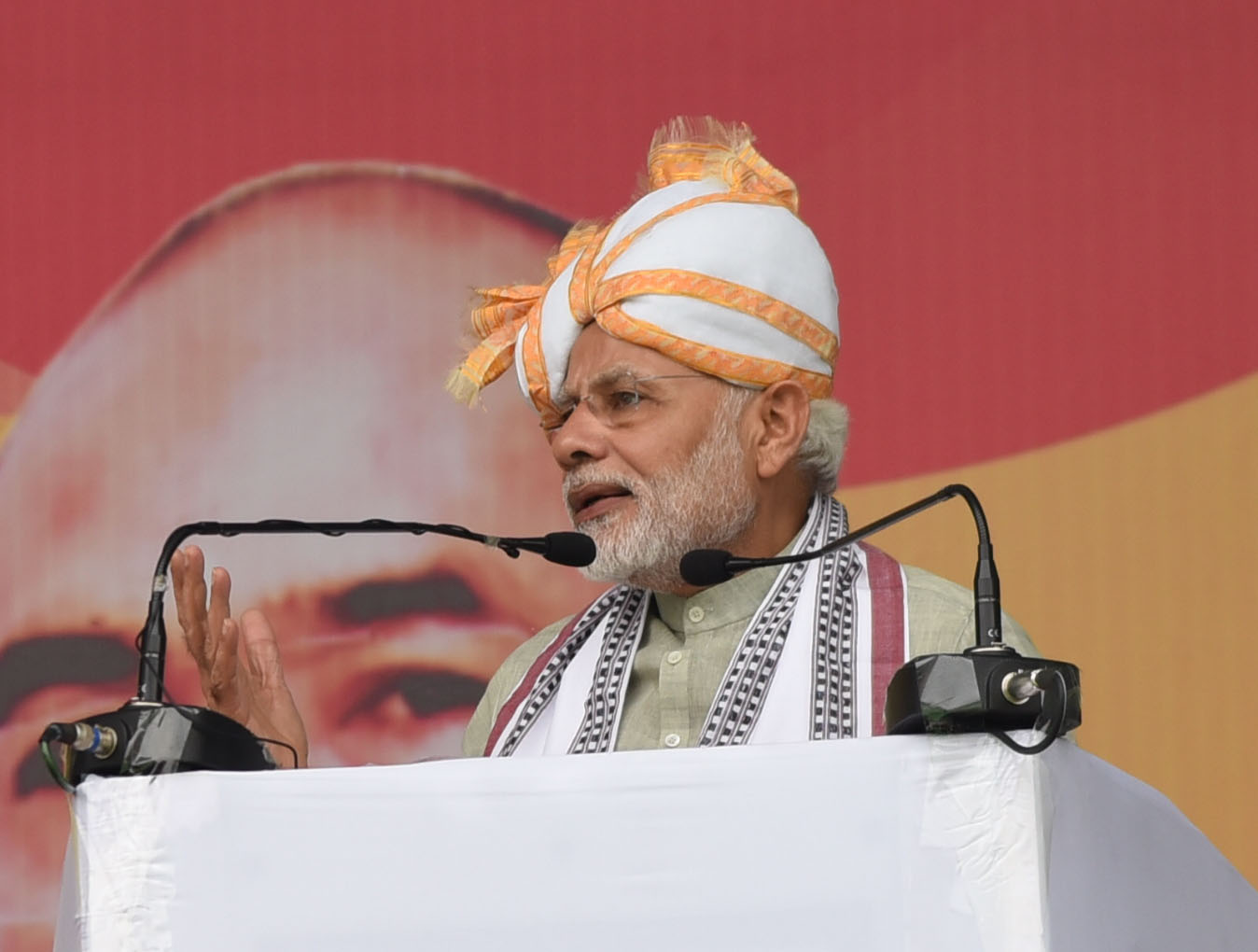
In politics

== See also ==
- Kajenglei
- Khamenchatpa
- Pheijom
- Khudei
- Phanek
