= Pheichom =

Meitei loincloth worn by men

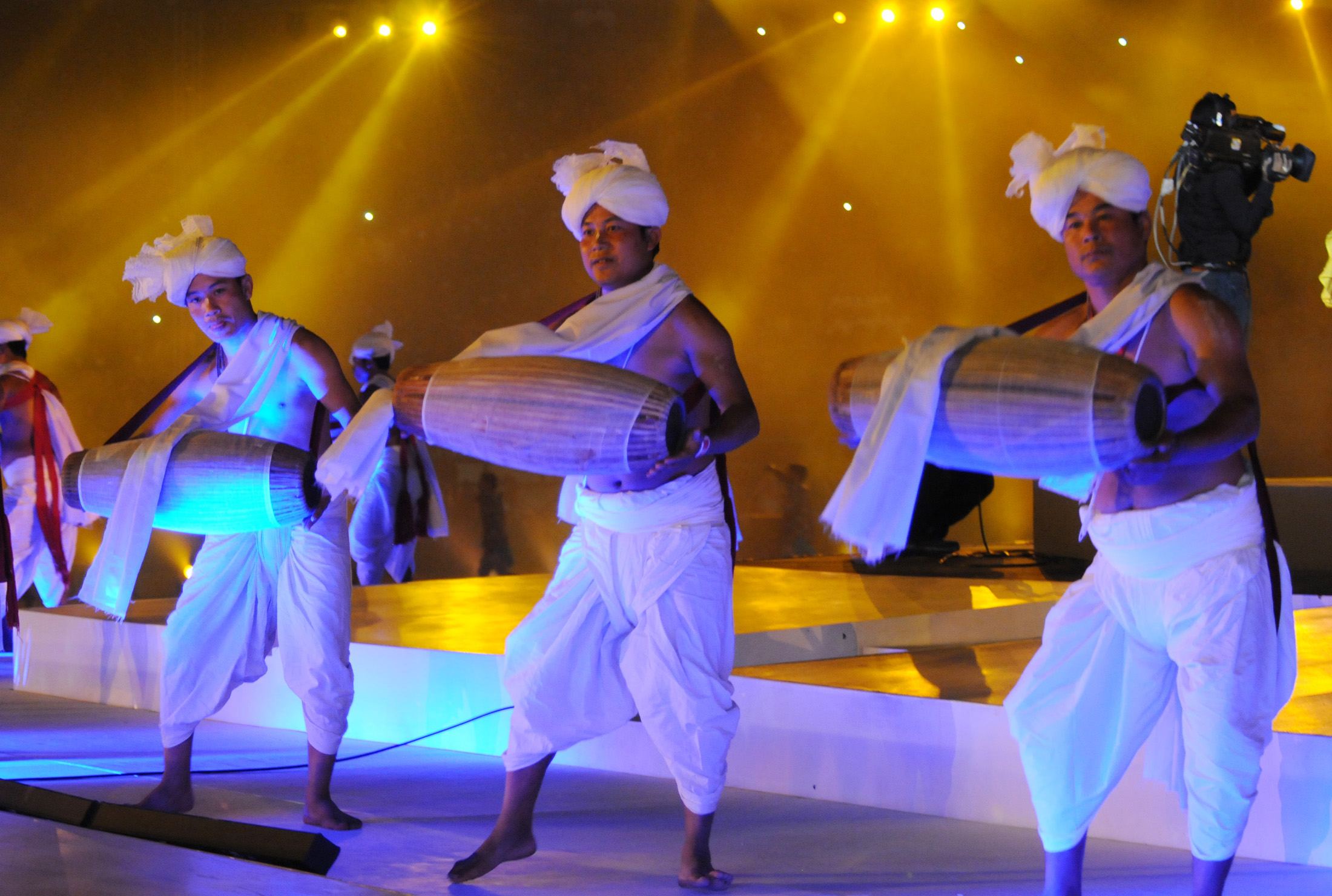
Pung Cholom performing artists wearing pheichoms.

Pheichom is a traditional Meitei loincloth worn by men. It is mainly made of cotton or silk in gold, saffron or white. The khamen chatpa is the most popular style of pheijom. The pheijom is similar to the dhoti, worn by men elsewhere in India.

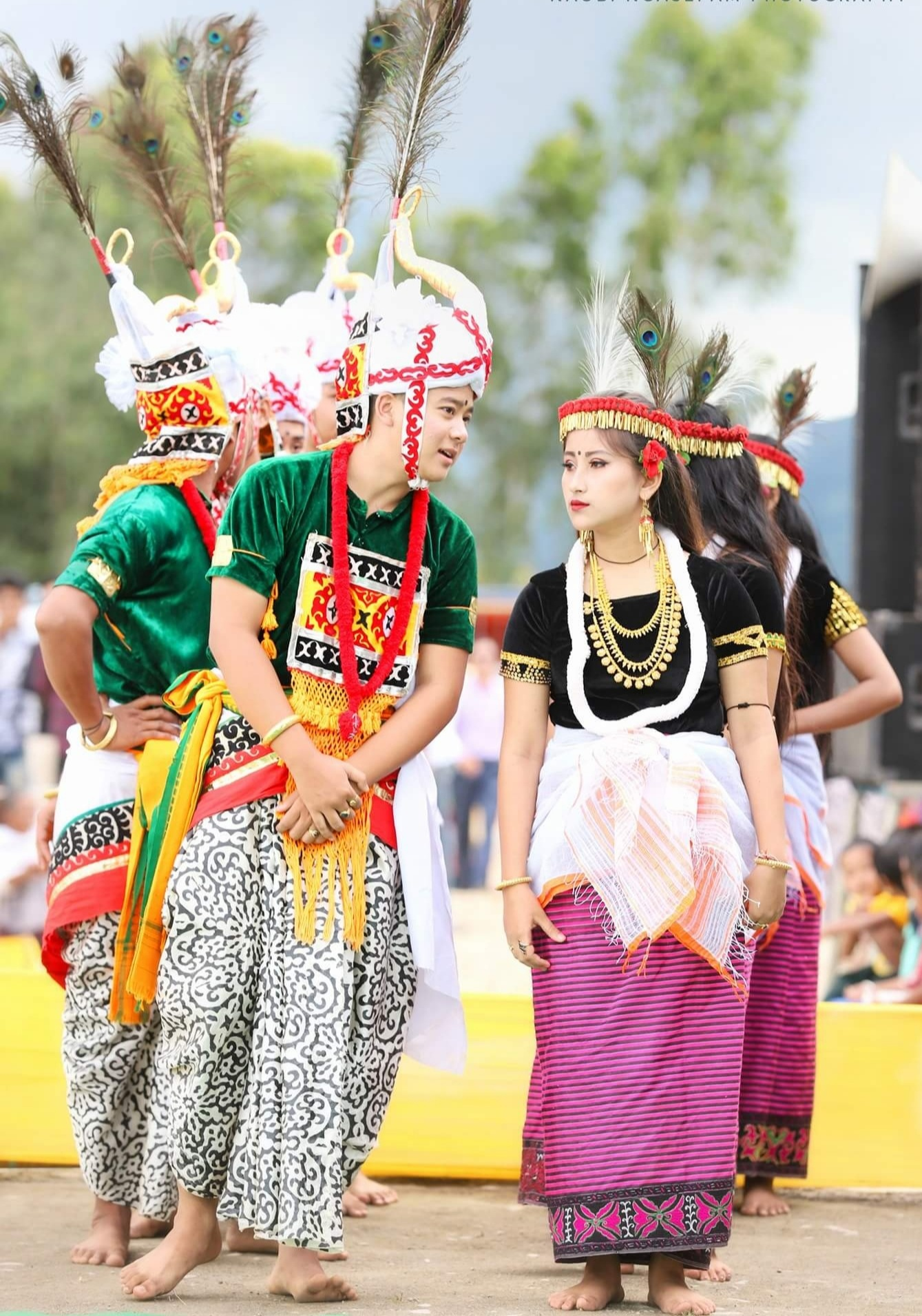
Meitei men wearing khamen chatpa.

A khamen chatpa is a white silk pheijom, block printed in black, brown, or purple. It is worn especially during the festival of Lai Haraoba. During the days of monarchy, the khamen chatpa was worn by royalty but not by people of lower rank. On auspicious occasions, Kings would honour favoured subjects by awarding a khamen chatpa. Although a pheijom is normally an item of male attire, the khamen chatpa is also worn by priestessess and Pena musicians.
