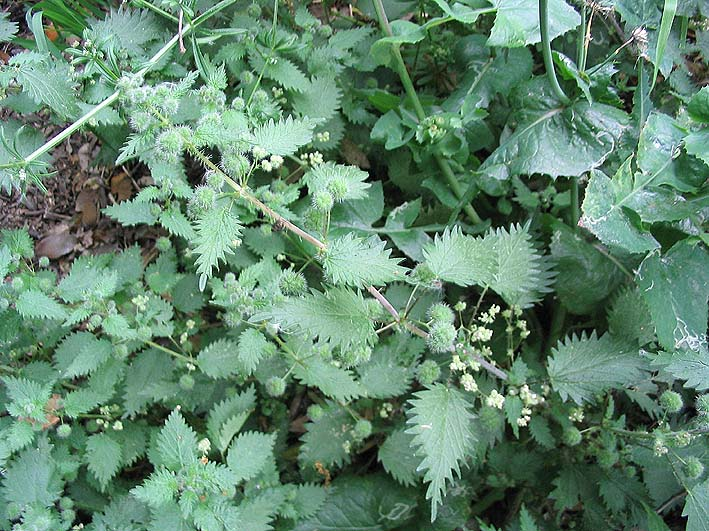

Scientific classification
- Kingdom: Plantae
- Clade: Tracheophytes
- Clade: Angiosperms
- Clade: Eudicots
- Clade: Rosids
- Order: Rosales
- Family: Urticaceae
- Genus: Urtica
- Species: U. pilulifera

Binomial name
- Urtica pilulifera L.

= Urtica pilulifera =

Species of flowering plant

Urtica pilulifera, also known as the Roman nettle, is a herbaceous annual flowering plant in the family Urticaceae.

== Description ==
Urtica pilulifera, also known as the Roman nettle, can grow up to around 2 feet tall. Its leaves have stinging hairs, which can irritate the skin.

== Distribution ==
Urtica pilulifera is native to the countries around the Mediterranean, and eastwards into the Arabian Peninsula and Iran. It has been introduced into Belgium, Germany and Great Britain. It is no longer found in Britain.

== Sources ==
- Sp. Pl. 2: 983. 1753
- "Urtica pilulifera L." Germplasm Resources Information Network. Agricultural Research Service, United States Department of Agriculture.
- https://lisalodwick.com/2014/04/10/romannettle/#:~:text=Flora%20Europaea%20does%20tell%20us,north%20but%20is%20now%20rare.
- https://pfaf.org/user/Plant.aspx?LatinName=Urtica+pilulifera
- https://www.qld.gov.au/environment/land/management/soil/soil-properties/texture
- https://www.abc.net.au/science/articles/2006/02/20/1574055.htm
- Kregiel, Dorota; Pawlikowska, Ewelina; Antolak, Hubert (9 July 2018). "Urtica spp.: Ordinary Plants with Extraordinary Properties". Molecules. 23 (7): 1664. doi:10.3390/molecules23071664. PMC 6100552. PMID 29987208.
- Fiol, Camila; Prado, Diego; Mora, María; Alava, J. Iñaki (July 2016). "Nettle cheese: Using nettle leaves (Urtica dioica) to coagulate milk in the fresh cheese making process". International Journal of Gastronomy and Food Science. 4: 19–24. doi:10.1016/j.ijgfs.2016.05.001.
