= List of accolades received by Mary Kom (film) =

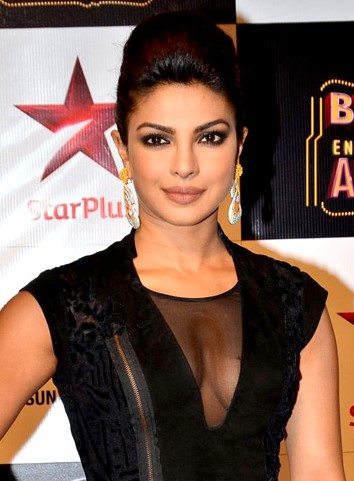
Priyanka Chopra's performance in Mary Kom garnered her several awards and nominations

Mary Kom is a 2014 Indian biographical sports drama film directed by Omung Kumar and produced by Sanjay Leela Bhansali and Viacom 18 Motion Pictures. The film features Priyanka Chopra in the lead role as the boxer Mary Kom, with Darshan Kumar and Sunil Thapa in supporting roles as her husband and mentor, Onler Kom and M. Narjit Singh respectively. The film was written by Saiwyn Quadras, with the cinematography provided by Keiko Nakahara while Bhansali co-edited the film with Rajesh G. Pandey. The film follows Kom's journey of becoming a boxer to her victory at the 2008 World Boxing Championships in Ningbo, China.

Before its theatrical release on 5 September 2014, the film premiered at the 2014 Toronto International Film Festival, where it became the first Hindi film to be screened on the opening night of the film festival. The film received generally positive reviews from critics and was a commercial success. It grossed ₹1.05 billion (US$12 million) at the box-office against a budget of ₹150 million (US$1.7 million). Mary Kom has received various awards and nominations, with praise for its direction, Chopra's performance, screenplay, editing, background score, and costume design. As of August 2015, the film has won 20 awards.

At the 62nd National Film Awards, the film won the National Film Award for Best Popular Film Providing Wholesome Entertainment. It was nominated for Best Film, and Best Actress for Chopra at the 60th Filmfare Awards. Mary Kom received ten nominations at the 2014 Star Guild Awards, including Best Film and Best Director, winning five awards: Best Actress in a Leading Role for Chopra, Best Debut Director for Kumar, Best Costume Design, Dialogue of the Year, and the Guild Presidents Award for Best Film. The film garnered eight nominations at the 21st Screen Awards, winning Best Actress for Chopra.

== Accolades ==
Award	Date of ceremony (Note: Date is linked to the article about the awards held that year, wherever possible.)	Category	Recipient(s) and nominee(s)	Result	Ref.
BIG Star Entertainment Awards	18 December 2014	Most Entertaining Film Actor – Female	Priyanka Chopra	Won	
BIG Star Entertainment Awards	18 December 2014	Most Entertaining Film of the Year	Mary Kom	Nominated	
BIG Star Entertainment Awards	18 December 2014	Most Entertaining Actor in a Social Drama Film – Female	Priyanka Chopra	Won	
BIG Star Entertainment Awards	18 December 2014	Most Entertaining Social Drama Film	Mary Kom	Won	
BIG Star Entertainment Awards	18 December 2014	Most Entertaining Actor (Film) Debut – Male	Darshan Kumar	Nominated	
Filmfare Awards	31 January 2015	Best Film	Sanjay Leela Bhansali	Nominated	
Filmfare Awards	31 January 2015	Best Actress	Priyanka Chopra	Nominated	
Filmfare Awards	31 January 2015	Best Background Score	Rohit Kulkarni	Nominated	
International Indian Film Academy Awards	7 June 2015	Best Film	Mary Kom	Nominated	
International Indian Film Academy Awards	7 June 2015	Best Actress	Priyanka Chopra	Nominated	
International Indian Film Academy Awards	7 June 2015	Best Debut Director	Omung Kumar	Won (Note: Tied with Sajid Nadiadwala for Kick.)	
Mirchi Music Awards	27 February 2015	Upcoming Music Composer of The Year	Shashi Suman (for song "Ziddi Dil")	Nominated	
Mirchi Music Awards	27 February 2015	Upcoming Music Composer of The Year	Shivam Pathak (for song "Sukoon Mila")	Nominated	
National Film Awards	3 May 2015	Best Popular Film Providing Wholesome Entertainment	Mary Kom	Won	
Screen Awards	14 January 2015	Best Actress	Priyanka Chopra	Won	
Screen Awards	14 January 2015	Best Actress – Popular Choice	Priyanka Chopra	Nominated	
Screen Awards	14 January 2015	Most Promising Debut Director	Omung Kumar	Nominated	
Screen Awards	14 January 2015	Best Supporting Actor	Darshan Kumar	Nominated	
Screen Awards	14 January 2015	Best Male Debut	Darshan Kumar	Nominated	
Screen Awards	14 January 2015	Best Screenplay	Saiwyn Quadras	Nominated	
Screen Awards	14 January 2015	Best Background Music	Rohit Kulkarni	Nominated	
Screen Awards	14 January 2015	Best Editing	Sanjay Leela Bhansali, Rajesh G. Pandey	Nominated	
Star Guild Awards (Note: Also known as Apsara Film & Television Producers Guild Awards.)	12 January 2015	Best Film	Mary Kom	Nominated	
Star Guild Awards	12 January 2015	The Guild Presidents Award for Best Film	Mary Kom	Won (Note: Tied with Highway.)	
Star Guild Awards	12 January 2015	Best Director	Omung Kumar	Nominated	
Star Guild Awards	12 January 2015	Best Actress in a Leading Role	Priyanka Chopra	Won	
Star Guild Awards	12 January 2015	Best Debut Director	Omung Kumar	Won (Note: Tied with Abhishek Varman for 2 States, Shashank Khaitan for Humpty Sharma Ki Dulhania and Nitin Kakkar for Filmistaan.)	
Star Guild Awards	12 January 2015	Best Male Debut	Darshan Kumar	Nominated	
Star Guild Awards	12 January 2015	Best Screenplay	Saiwyn Quadras	Nominated	
Star Guild Awards	12 January 2015	Dialogue of the Year	Priyanka Chopra	Won	
Star Guild Awards	12 January 2015	Best Dialogue	Karan Singh Rathore	Nominated	
Star Guild Awards	12 January 2015	Best Costume Design	Isha Mantry, Rajat K Tangri	Won (Note: Tied with Payal Saluja for Dedh Ishqiya.)	
Stardust Awards	15 December 2014	Star of the Year – Female	Priyanka Chopra	Nominated	
Stardust Awards	15 December 2014	Best Actress in a Drama	Priyanka Chopra	Won	

== See also ==
- List of Bollywood films of 2014
