= Mary Kom (film) =

2014 Indian film by Omung Kumar

- Theatrical release poster
- Directed by: Omung Kumar
- Written by: Saiwyn Quadras
- Dialogues by: Ramendra Vasishth; Karan Singh Rathore
- Produced by: Sanjay Leela Bhansali
- Starring: Priyanka Chopra; Darshan Kumaar; Sunil Thapa
- Cinematography: Keiko Nakahara
- Edited by: Rajesh G. Pandey; Sanjay Leela Bhansali
- Music by: Songs: Shashi Suman; Shivamm Pathak; Score: Rohit Kulkarni
- Production companies: Bhansali Productions; Viacom18 Motion Pictures
- Distributed by: Viacom18 Motion Pictures
- Release date: 5 September 2014
- Running time: 122 minutes
- Country: India
- Language: Hindi
- Budget: ₹38 crore
- Box office: est. ₹86.19 crore

Mary Kom is a 2014 Indian Hindi-language biographical sports film based on the life of the eponymous boxer Mary Kom, directed by Omung Kumar and produced by Viacom18 Motion Pictures and Sanjay Leela Bhansali. The film stars Priyanka Chopra in the lead role, with newcomer Darshan Kumar and Sunil Thapa in the supporting roles of her husband and mentor, respectively, and depicts Kom's journey from becoming a boxer to her victory at the 2008 World Boxing Championships in Ningbo. The film marks the Hindi playback singing debut of Chopra, who provided her vocals for a song named "Chaoro" (a Meiteilon lullaby).

Mary Kom was developed by the writer Saiwyn Quadras, who suggested the storyline to Kumar when Kom was not a familiar name in India despite her numerous achievements. Kumar met Kom to ask her permission for the film, before her bronze medal victory at the 2012 Summer Olympics, which brought her recognition. Chopra underwent extensive physical training for four months to attain a muscular physique and learned the sport and Kom's distinct boxing style. Principal photography started in June 2013 at Filmistan, where the boxing sequences were filmed. After plans to shoot in Kom's hometown, Manipur, were dropped due to safety concerns, Mary Kom was shot in Dharamshala and Manali, where a major portion of Manipur was recreated.

The film premiered at the 2014 Toronto International Film Festival, becoming the first Hindi film to be screened on the opening night of the festival. Made on a budget of ₹38 crore (US$3.9 million), Mary Kom was released on 5 September 2014 to generally positive reviews with praise for Chopra's performance. Upon its release, the film recorded the highest opening weekend of all time for a female-led Indian film. The film was a box office success, grossing ₹86.19 crore (US$9.0 million) at the box office. Mary Kom is also ranked among the highest-grossing Indian films led by a female actor.

Mary Kom received several accolades at award ceremonies across India. The film won the National Film Award for Best Popular Film Providing Wholesome Entertainment and was nominated for the Filmfare Award for Best Film and Best Actress for Chopra. Additionally, Chopra won the Screen Award and the Producers Guild Film Award for Best Actress in a Leading Role.

== Plot ==
A young Mangte Chungneijang Kom, daughter of a rice farmer from Imphal, finds a boxing glove in the remains of an air crash in 1991 in Kangathei. Kom is fascinated by the glove and grows up taking a keen interest in boxing, despite her father's disapproval. During an early fight, she chases a boy and ends up in a boxing gym. After realising that the coach of the gym, Narjit Singh, was also the coach of the Asian champion Dingko Singh, Kom tells him about her boxing aspirations. He asks her to visit the gym for the next thirty days and says that he will only teach her if she is deserving enough. She starts visiting the gym, informing her mother but not her father. Days pass, but her coach does not enquire about her. Due to Kom's dedication and stubbornness, Singh starts training her. Later, he suggests changing her name to Mary.

Kom challenges a local wrestler for money, in order to buy back a household cow, which the family had to sell off because of their financial troubles, this is where she meets the footballer Onler Kom. After winning the state-level championship, her father confronts her for keeping her involvement in the sport from him. When her father asks her to choose between him and boxing, she reluctantly chooses the sport. After watching her victorious 2002 Women's World Amateur Boxing Championships match on television, her father reconciles with Kom, and apologises to her for not understanding her passion for the sport. Meanwhile, Onler proposes to her and agrees never to ask her to quit boxing. After she wins the 2006 Women's World Amateur Boxing Championships, Kom agrees to marry him, much to her coach's dissatisfaction. After the marriage, Kom gets pregnant and gives up her career to look after her family.

Kom gives birth to twins and applies for a government job. However, she refuses the position of a police constable, feeling that as a world-champion boxer, she deserves better. It devastates her to learn that people no longer recognise her. Onler encourages her to restart her boxing training. She joins the gym again, leaving her husband to look after their twins at home. Her coach is still upset about her decision to marry, but Kom makes a comeback in the National Boxing Championship. Despite performing better than her opponent, she loses the match due to the apparent partiality of the judges. Kom throws a chair in anger towards them, resulting in a ban. She later writes an apology letter, and the official accepts it, but only after insulting her.

Kom then convinces Narjit Singh to train her, as she thinks that he is the one who can get the best out of her. After completing her training, she participates in the 2008 AIBA Women's World Boxing Championships and reaches the finals. Meanwhile, Onler informs her about one of their children having ventricular septal defect. In the subsequent fight, Kom fails to defend herself. After a knockout punch from her opponent, Kom hallucinates about her husband and children in the audience. She regains her strength and fights back, winning the championship. On the podium, while accepting the medal, she learns that her son's surgery was successful. Later, she is given the nickname "Magnificent Mary", with the Indian flag waving and the Indian national anthem playing in the background.

== Cast ==
- Priyanka Chopra as Mary Kom
- Sunil Thapa as M. Narjit Singh
- Darshan Kumar as Onler Kom
- Robin Das as Mangte Tonpa Kom
- Rajni Basumatary as Mangte Akham Kom
- Lin Laishram as Bem-Bem
- Bijou Thaangjam as Naobi
- Zachary Coffin as a German boxing coach
- Bandari Raghavendra as Peter Michael
- Shishir Sharma as National team coach
- Shakti Sinha as S. Sharma
- Kenny Basumatary as Jimmy
- Ritika Murthy as journalist
- Binud Kumbang as Lalboi
- Pabitra Rabha Jalah as Asong
- Ramendra Vasishth as Federation official's assistant
- Rajesh Nigam as Federation official's assistant
- Deepak Kumar Singh as Alberto
- Mridul Satam as Young Mary Kom

Credits adapted from Bollywood Hungama.

== Production ==
=== Development ===
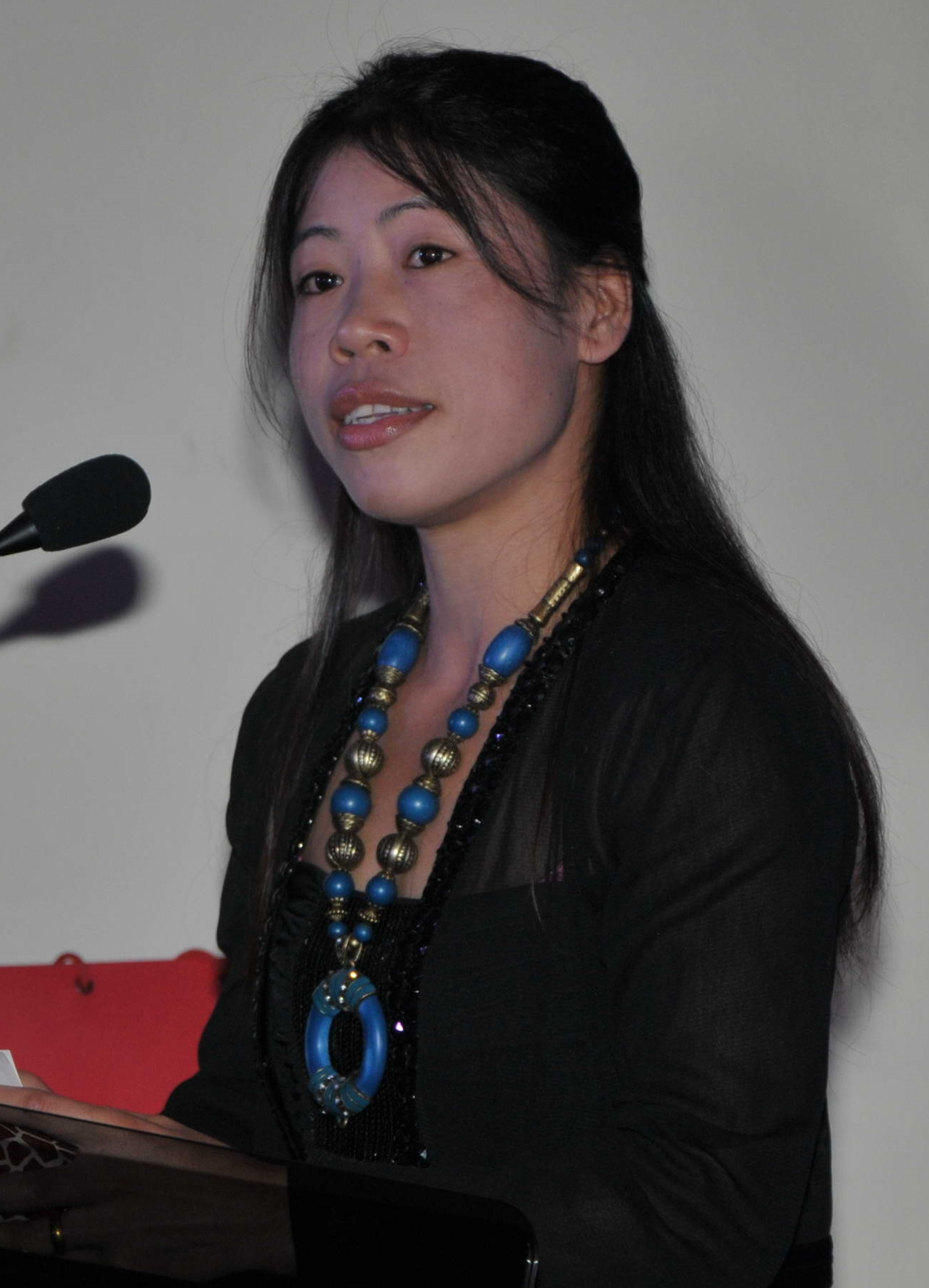
Mary Kom was hailed as a National hero after the Olympic win, which also highlighted her previous achievements

During his work as an art director on Sanjay Leela Bhansali's Saawariya (2007), Omung Kumar started writing two scripts simultaneously for his directorial debut. However, none of the films were made. He then asked writer Saiwyn Quadras to look for a female biographical subject for his first film, specifying "a role that no actress would turn down." He added that he "wanted to make a film that would be like the Mother India of someone's career." Historical personalities such as Rani Laxmi Bai and Queen Elizabeth I of England came up for discussion; however they did not inspire Kumar. Quadras put forward the name of five-time world boxing champion Mary Kom, who despite numerous achievements, was at that time an unfamiliar name in India. Kumar admitted that he felt disgusted after being told of Kom's achievements as he was unaware of her existence. Quadras later approached Kumar with the script for Mary Kom, and he decided to make his directorial debut with it.

Quadras, who was interested in sports, started writing the screenplay for the film in 2011, which took two years to complete. Quadras arranged a meeting with Kom via her manager in the year he started writing the script. Kumar went to Manipur to meet Kom and seek her permission to make the film. Initially, Kom was surprised by the development as the sport, especially women's boxing, was not well known in India. However, she was enthusiastic about the idea.

When Omung came to me I was a five-time World Amateur Boxing champion. I was surprised why he would want to make a movie on me and thought he was joking or gone mad! Boxing, especially in the women's section, is not so well known in India as it's hardly reported, and no one recognized me as Mary Kom.

— Mary Kom, on the development of the film.

Research for the film was done through available sources, such as online information and newspaper archives. Kom's videos played a key role in the research. The writer also had several telephone and email conversations with her regarding her biography. In her interactions with Quadras and Kumar, Kom was forthcoming when it came to the details of her life, and had significant input in the screenplay. However, Quadras revealed that his biggest challenge was to make the film authentic and cinematic yet not documentary-like, so he wrote the film in a manner that showed the struggles Kom went through as a female sportsperson who had to confront opposition from her father, politics and making a comeback after a long career break. Karan Singh Rathore Ramendra Vashishth wrote the dialogues. The film only shows the period from her early struggles and her comeback after motherhood. Her fifth World Boxing Championship win and the London Olympics were left out because of the contract that permitted a depiction of Kom's life up to 2008. The contract for the film was signed at that time when Kom had not even qualified for the London Olympics. Nevertheless, the film took several cinematic liberties for dramatic effects.

In a 2012 meeting with Bhansali, Kumar told him about the film; he explained that this was a kind of cinema contrary to Bhansali's signature work. Still, Bhansali wanted to hear the story and was also enthusiastic towards the project. After hearing the script, he liked it and immediately agreed to produce the film. Viacom18 Motion Pictures and Bhansali, Under his production company Bhansali Productions came together to produce the film. However, Kumar's colleagues were not sure if a film based in Manipur would be well received by the audience. This concern evaporated after the 2012 Summer Olympics, where Kom won a bronze medal. Her win also highlighted her previous achievements. After the news of the development of the film broke in the media, the makers clarified that the film was in development since 2011, much before the Olympics, and they were not influenced by her recent success. In an interview with Press Trust of India, Bhansali described the film as a "rare experiment", for the fact that "Not many films are based on biopics of living people" and expressed his pride about his association with the project, adding that the story was so inspiring, it touched his heart.

=== Casting and characters ===
Chopra was Kumar's and Bhansali's first choice for the title role. In early November 2012, media reports suggested that Chopra entered negotiations to star in the film, which she denied initially. Later in that month, it was confirmed that she had been cast for the part. She was initially skeptical about the film due to the demanding nature of the character, which included training, muscle building, and learning the sport. She later agreed to the film because of Kumar's confidence in her. The decision to cast Chopra proved controversial as some believed that an actress from Northeast India bearing Kom's likeness would be better suited for the role. The director however felt that the film needed a big star with a wider reach and casting an unknown actress from that region would reduce the film's scope and lessen its reach, thus defeating his purpose of telling Kom's story to a larger audience. Emphasizing Chopra's bankability and reach among the audiences Kumar remarked, "I not only needed a capable actress but also someone who can connect with millions of viewers". Mary Kom defended Chopra's casting and thought of Chopra as the "perfect choice" for the role. In an interview with Daily News and Analysis, Kom described Chopra as the best actress to play the role, adding that her body was well structured, like that of a boxer.

In contrast, it took the casting directors Shruti Mahajan and Paragg Mehta several months of auditions to finalise the appropriate supporting actors for the film. In May 2013, a wide section of the media reported that Danny Denzongpa was approached to play Kom's coach Narjit Singh in the film. Instead, Sunil Thapa was cast for the role of Kom's coach. Darshan Kumar was finalised as Kom's husband, footballer Onler Kom, after a series of auditions which included three different looks representing three different stages in his life. Robin Das, a National School of Drama professor, was cast in the role of Kom's father.

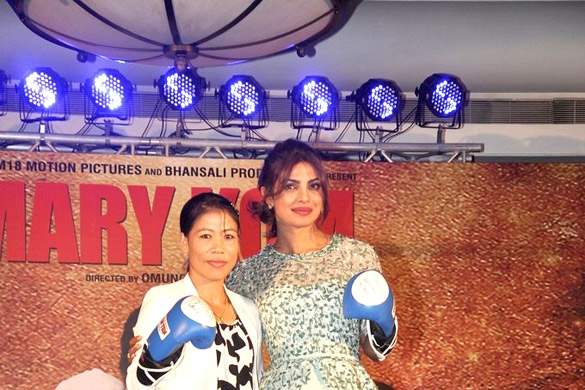
Kom and Chopra at the music release of the film

Before filming began, Chopra prepared for three months. The preparations included building the physique of a boxer and learning the sport. Samir Jaura was brought in to train Chopra. At that time, she was busy dubbing for Krrish 3 (2013), and filming for Gunday (2014). It was then decided that Jaura would accompany her to film shoots, so that continuity in training could be maintained. Though he did not get a chance to meet Kom, he used her videos to study her body language and prepare a workout plan for Chopra, who started training in April 2013. She found it hard to train vigorously to attain a boxer's physique. She was put on a low-carb, high-protein diet. "As a girl it was very difficult to build those muscles. I had to build in three months what Mary did in 15 years", she said in an interview with Deccan Chronicle.

Chopra got a fifteen-day break from her other commitments to train for the film. She relocated to her bungalow in Goa, where she would train for five hours a day. After completing workouts, which included weights and circuit training, she insisted on training for boxing. Later, boxing was made a part of her daily workout. She was trained by Kom's coaches to learn her distinct boxing style. Chopra explained that she did not have to act like a boxer, but had to become one and said, "To learn boxing was a religion. Today, I can play the sport as I know the rules, body posture, foot work, I can hit, I can defend. I know the game."

Chopra found Mary Kom a very special and personal film due to the inspiring story, adding that she pushed herself to do justice to the role. She revealed that she channeled the grief of her father's death into the film: "I started this film at the hardest point in my life, four days after my father passed away. All my grief, everything, I have shoved into this movie. A part of my soul has gone into it." In an interview with Daily News and Analysis, Chopra revealed that since she could not look like her, she did not try to imitate Kom as her main focus was to represent Kom's spirit and personality. In July 2013, Chopra visited Kom's home town of Manipur to learn more about her life. As part of her research, Chopra stayed with Kom and her family for three to four days, and went to her boxing academy and church to learn more about her. Kom stated, "When she came to Manipur, she knew about boxing so I gave her tips as a mother and a wife, how I went about managing my home and profession, how I live with my family – basically she got to know aspects of my family life." To get Kom's Hindi and Manipuri accents right, Chopra listened to the taped conversations of the boxer.

Darshan Kumar described his character as an "encouraging husband", who is the pillar of strength in Kom's life. He found the character challenging due to contrasting personalities. Unlike Chopra, Kumar did not meet Onler Kom before the film. He mainly made use of the videos which Kom had provided to the makers, which helped him understand the nuances of his character. For the role, he had to learn the Manipuri accent, which was difficult for him being a Haryanvi. Kumar lost 12 kilogram to look the part, and followed a strict, grilled chicken and oil-free fish protein diet for three months.

=== Pre-production ===
The production design was handled by Kumar's wife, Vanita. After plans to shoot in Manipur were dropped because of safety concerns, extensive research was done to find locations similar to Manipur. Their search ended in Manali, Himachal Pradesh, where a major portion of the state was recreated. Vanita used a real structure instead of a set to show Kom's childhood home in Kangathei. She recreated the look and feel of Manipur in Dharamshala and Manali.

During the search, Vanita found two houses that were similar to those where Kom spent her childhood and lived after her marriage. For authenticity, the house was filled with items similar to those found at Kom's house, such as indigenous short stools and woven curtains sourced from Manipur. Since Kom has a separate trophy room where all her awards are kept, a similar room was created. Quotes from the Bible were added on the walls. A 19th-century church in Dharamshala was chosen for the wedding sequence. Vanita noted that "the cinematic realism, was a different experience from the grandeur of Bhansali's sets." However, she found it difficult to recreate the run-down gym where Kom was trained. A place was chosen with minimal facilities and water leaking onto the walls. She revealed that the sets had to feel authentic rather than artificially created. The costumes were designed by Isha Mantry and Rajat Tangri. Tangri visited Manipur to study fabric used in local clothing. Tangri used photographs from Kom's childhood to create clothing which ranged from traditional to sporty and athletic attires. For Kom's wedding sequence in the film, Tangri created an exact replica of her wedding gown.

Hollywood-based Mark Garbarino was Chopra's makeup artist. At first, they wanted her to look exactly like Kom by using prosthetic makeup. Chopra did a prosthetic test in the United States which included heavier eyelids for a more East-Asian look. However, the final result did not appeal to the makers. Also, the prosthetic would not hold during the filming of the heavy-action boxing scenes. It was later reported that Chopra's look would be created post production by using visual effects. However, the results were unsatisfactory and hence this idea was also dropped. Chopra said "We tried a bunch of stuff – Visual effects, prosthetics, makeup, [but] it looked too gimmicky. That's when we decided to go with just carrying the essence of the film, rather than the outer, cosmetic part." Later, Uday Shirali, Chopra's makeup artist since Agneepath (2012), was hired. For creating boxing scars, makeup artist Subhash Shinde was employed. His biggest challenges were to make the fight marks look as realistic as possible as it required a lot of time and detailing. He stated, "Every punch or scar needed to look real, change colour and age with time on screen, and shouldn't look like they were created using makeup." He did some research by visiting hospitals to understand more about skin injuries. Rohit Kulkarni composed the background score.

=== Filming ===
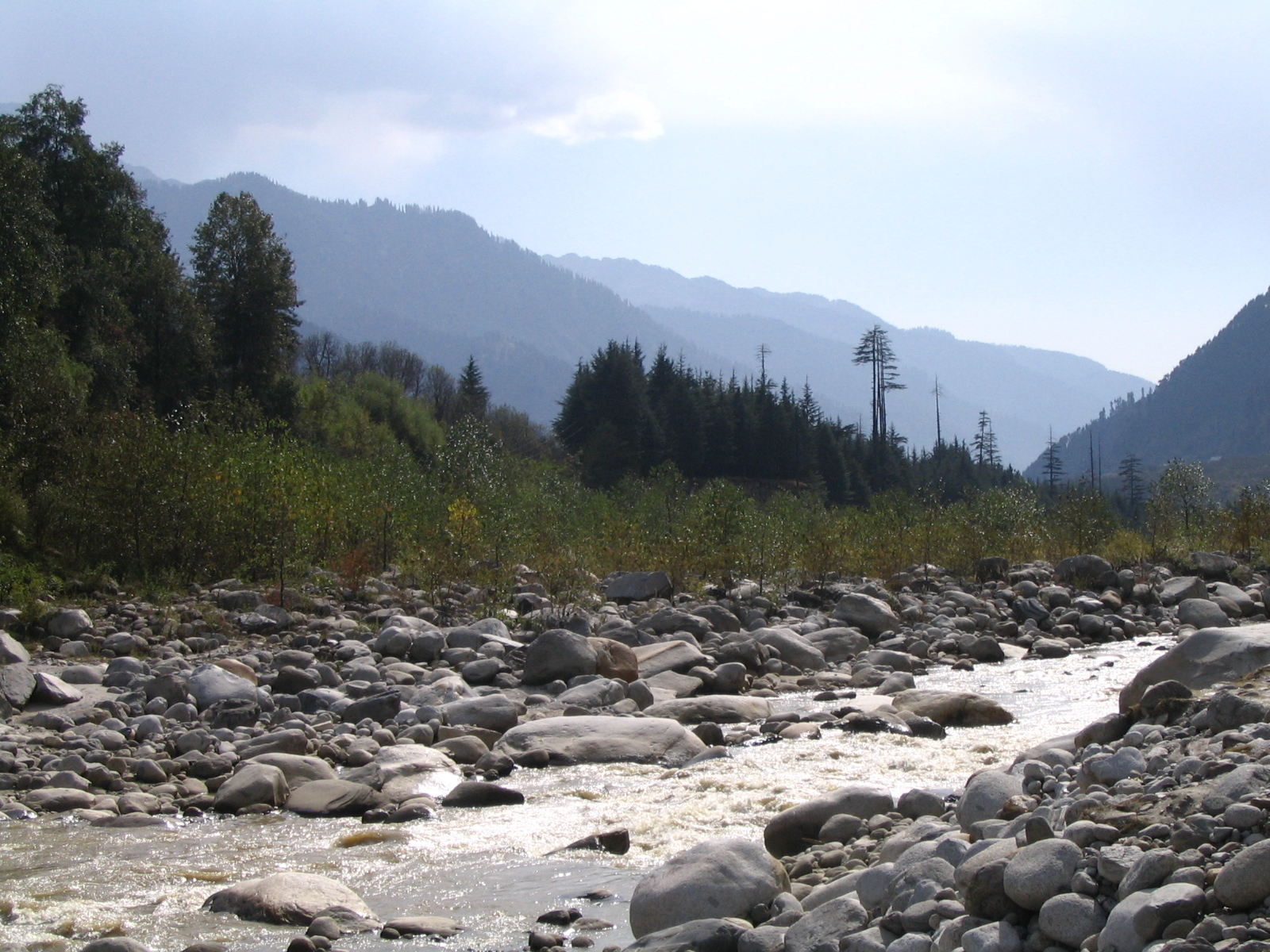
The film was extensively shot in Manali

Principal photography began on 17 June 2013 at Filmistan, Mumbai. The media reports suggested that, with sets ready and Chopra already training, the filming was supposed to start earlier at Filmistan, but following Chopra's father's death, the plans for shooting were put on hold. Bhansali had told Chopra that the filming could wait and to take some time off in the wake of her loss; however, the actress insisted on starting filming immediately. Cinematographer Keiko Nakahara used a hand-held camera during the shooting of the film. Sports coordinator Robert Miller was hired to choreograph the fight sequences. Miller roped in Christy Halbert, the United States's assistant coach at the London Olympics, to help choreograph the fight scenes. To make the boxing scenes authentic, some of the crew members, including Kumar himself, learnt boxing to get the necessary understanding of the sport to film the fight scenes. Initially, the makers had planned to use actors and teach them boxing to film the boxing scenes. They eventually realised that it would not be feasible and would be time-consuming. They also thought that if both Chopra and her opponents were not real boxers, it would not look convincing enough. Professional boxers were then employed to film the boxing sequences for giving a more natural feel and convincing look. Filming boxing scenes were difficult for Chopra as she was hurt several times; she says, "They are real boxers, and they don't know how to fake a punch, they had to really hit you. So I had to get hit a lot and that was really hard."

The second schedule commenced in Manali in late March 2014, after Chopra finished her other film commitments. Before filming, Chopra had to re-train herself to build muscles. Bhansali planned an elaborate, over-a-month-long schedule for her, which ensured that her physicality and agility were suitable enough for the role. While filming a sequence in a marketplace, more than ten thousand people gathered on the sets. Due to limited security arrangements, the crowds became uncontrollable in what was not believed to be a heavily populated area. When Chopra stepped out of her van, some fans tried to approach her, causing the general loss of control. As a result, the shoot was cancelled and the whole crew had to leave. Filming in Manali continued till early April 2014, before shifting to Dharamshala. While filming fight sequence in Dharamshala, Chopra suffered an eye injury, which the makeup team exaggerated for effect. The filming in Dharamshala continued till 19 April 2014. The filming was done in 57 days over the course of two years. Rajesh G. Pandey edited the film with Bhansali.

== Soundtrack ==
The soundtrack of the film consists of seven original songs composed by duo Shashi Suman and Shivamm Pathak, with lyrics by Prashant Ingole and Sandip Ssingh. The background music was composed by Rohit Kulkarni. Vocals were performed by Vishal Dadlani, Arijit Singh, Sunidhi Chauhan, Mohit Chauhan, Salim Merchant, Divya Kumar. Chopra made her Hindi playback singing debut with a lullaby, "Chaoro". The soundtrack was released by Zee Music Company on 4 August 2014. The song "Salaam India" was the official song at the 2014 Asian Games, held in South Korea.

== Marketing and release ==
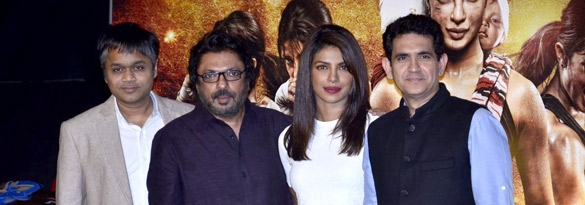
CEO of Viacom 18 Motion Pictures Ajit Andhare, Bhansali, Chopra, and Kumar at the trailer launch of Mary Kom

Mary Kom was one of the highly anticipated films of 2014. The first poster for the film was revealed on 14 July 2014 by Chopra through her Twitter account. It portrayed a muscular Chopra as Mary Kom in sports clothing, with her hair tied in a pony tail, punching a bag. It received positive feedback from film critics, industry professionals, and audiences alike. Sweta Kaushal of Hindustan Times noted that "with well-built muscles and a completely toned body, Priyanka looks fierce." The poster went viral on social media, with the hashtag "#MaryKomFirstLook" trending in India and worldwide. The following day, Chopra tweeted another poster for the film; a motion poster was released on the same day. The first teaser with the tagline "Most Champions Make Their Name. She Made History" was released on Chopra's birthday (18 July). With the interest generated by these reveals, the trailer release was highly anticipated, with media reporting that it would be unveiled on 24 July. However, it was released the day before at an event on 23 July and generated interest in the audience, media and critics. On 27 August, a special screening was held for selected members of media, trade and critics, where 20 minutes of raw footage from the film was previewed, creating a positive buzz. Mary Kom herself (along with her husband) attended few promotional events of the film. As part of their promotional strategy, Bhansali Productions released a doll, which looked like Chopra as Kom.

The film was originally scheduled for release on 2 October (on Gandhi Jayanti), however, it was announced that the film was postponed to an uncertain date to revamp the film to feature more events surrounding Kom's life. After the uncertainty of a release date for a month, it was announced that the film would be released on 5 September (Teacher's Day), clashing with Daawat-e-Ishq, which starred Chopra's cousin, Parineeti. Yash Raj Films requested that Bhansali shift the release date, which he refused due to previous release date changes of the film and the ongoing promotional activities. Later, Yash Raj Films postponed the Daawat-e-Ishq release date by two weeks.

On 4 September, Mary Kom had its world premiere at the 2014 Toronto International Film Festival, where it became the first Hindi film to be screened on the opening night of the film festival. It was released in 1500 screens worldwide. The film was released in overseas markets by Eros International as part of a four-film deal between Eros and Viacom 18 studios. The rights to television broadcasting belonged to Viacom18's flagship general entertainment channel Colors. The film was not released in Kom's home state of Manipur because of the ban on Bollywood films by the Imphal-based separatist militant group, Revolutionary Peoples Front (RPF) since 2000. In an interview with Press Trust of India, Kom expressed her sadness that people from her own state would not be able to see her biopic. However, unauthorised DVDs and VCDs flooded the state, with the DVD format in great demand as the only option for native people to watch the film.

Made on a budget of ₹180 million including production, prints and advertising, and marketing, Mary Kom earned ₹200 million, and before release recouped more than its cost from brand tie-ups. The film made profits before the release. Partnership was arranged in a way that the products from brands were either showcased in the film or the brands promoted the film in their advertising. The satellite rights of the film were sold for ₹140 million and music rights for ₹30 million. The film was released in DVDs on 15 October 2014 across all regions in a one-disc pack in NTSC format. Distributed by Shemaroo Entertainment, it contained behind-the-scene footage and deleted scenes. The VCD and Blu-ray versions were released at the same time. The Mary Kom Blu-ray is the first Blu-ray title in India to feature a Dolby Atmos soundtrack.

== Reception ==
=== Critical reception ===
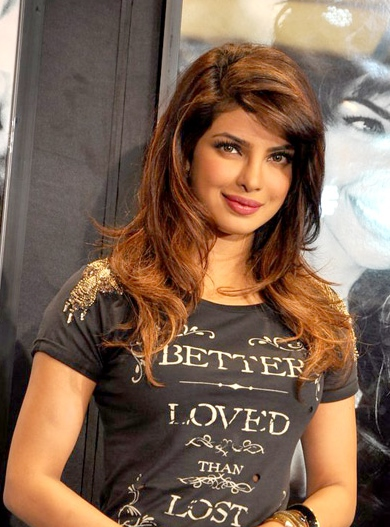
Chopra received critical acclaim for her portrayal of Mary Kom

The film received generally positive reviews from critics, with Chopra receiving critical acclaim for her performance. Subhash K. Jha awarded the film 5 stars out of 5, describing it as "a motivational masterpiece" and said "From first frame to last it grips your senses and irrigates the parched corridors of your heart like very few bio-pics in recent times. [...] a work that is as dramatic as Mehboob's Mother India and as inspiring as Attenborough's Gandhi." Jha lauded Chopra's transformation into Kom and noted her for expressing every shade of the character with a "pitch-perfect" bravado. Rediff.com rated the film 4.5 out of 5, noting it as a victory for its protagonist Chopra, scriptwriter Saiwyn Quadras, and director Omung Kumar and wrote "Mary's story is delivered with a sincerity that makes it irresistible." Sonia Chopra from Sify described the film as a "thrilling ringside view", saying that "Mary Kom is an important film that's hugely inspiring. But more importantly, it's also great fun to watch." The reviewer singled out Chopra's performance, writing "Priyanka Chopra, transformed into Mary Kom, to give us this year's most earnest, memorable performance thus far!" The Times of India gave the film a rating of 4 stars out of 5 calling it as Bollywood's answer to Academy Award-winning film Million Dollar Baby (2004). Bollywood Hungama gave it 4 stars, stating that the film "will surely go down in the history of exemplary biopics on Indian celluloid." The review noted the technical aspects of the film such as the cinematography, costumes, background score which "overshadowed" the film's soundtrack and the "crisp" editing.

Namrata Joshi from Outlook rated the film with 3 stars out of 4 and commented on the simple, unpretentious storyline that dramatised important events from the champion's life, complimenting Chopra's "sincere and earnest" performance. The Economic Times gave a rating of 4 stars out of 5, noting that the film is well on its way to being one of the most praised sports-based films since Chak De India and Bhaag Milkha Bhaag and wrote "This is one of those boxing movies which is much more than boxing. It takes you to a place which is beyond ruptured cheeks, cracked jaws, and fractured ribs of the protagonist." Writing for Hindustan Times, Anupama Chopra rated the film 3 out of 5, noting it as a "worthy attempt", saying that the film had sincerity and was crafted with care, but criticised the screenplay which she thought was limited to "ticking off milestones" of Kom's career. She felt that the film was powered by Chopra's "remarkable" performance. Mayank Shekhar also rated the film with 3 stars, stating that his biggest concern before getting into the film was that the film-makers (Sanjay Leela Bhansali) would excessively "Bollywood-ise" Kom's story. He commented that this fear was "thankfully" not found. Rajeev Masand remarked that the film was "perfectly watchable, but never great like it should've been", criticising the "bland" script and wrote, "the film ticks off each of Mary Kom's career achievements and key personal struggles, but doesn't tell you much more about her as a person." Masand was impressed by Chopra's performance noting that the actress "transforms herself physically, and also skillfully conveys both the rage and vulnerability that the part required."

Sudhish Kamath from The Hindu thought that the script was generic and predictable, and the plot was actually manipulative. However, Kamath felt that the film should be watched for Chopra who gave a "knockout" performance, writing "The spirited actress rises above the material and makes us invest in her. She owns the film and does full justice to the spirit of the world champion, making all that criticism about her casting irrelevant." On the contrary, Business Standard criticised the film for not showing enough about boxing in general rather than Kom in particular. It stated that "while Mary Kom is entertaining, it should have aspired to be more." Shubhra Gupta from The Indian Express gave a rating of 2.5, noting that the "Film gets bloated by extraneous songs", and criticised the product placements calling them a "distraction from the story." The India Today reviewer, Rohit Khilnani, criticised Kumar's direction and wrote "The story is predictable from the word go and there are absolutely no surprise elements. A lot could have been done with such a strong protagonist, but the director doesn't experiment."

Concerning the controversy over Chopra being cast as Kom, a number of critics including Lin Laishram and Adil Hussain opined that it was a missed opportunity in showcasing a Northeast Indian actress in a lead role, given the lack of actors and actresses from the region in mainstream Hindi films. Rashmi Sawhney noted, "It is telling that there is not one actor from any of the North-Eastern states who has gained firm foothold in the Bombay film industry — the Sikkimese-Bhutia actor, Danny Denzongpa was possibly the lone exception, and the Nepali Manisha Koirala was as close as Hindi cinema got to romancing ‘slit eyes’." Adding to Sawhney's observations, Manipuri actor Bijou Thaangjam remarked that opportunities for actors and actresses of the region are often restricted to inconsequential token roles, many of which consist of little more than stereotypes or caricatures. Chopra later addressed the casting decision in 2022, and agreed that the role should have gone to a Northeast Indian actress.

=== Box office ===
On its opening day, the film earned ₹85 million, marking the biggest opening collection for a women-centric film. Following the positive word of mouth, Saturday collections showed a growth of 20% from Friday and went on to collect ₹90 million. The collection on Sunday showed an additional 20% growth from Saturday, earning approximately ₹110 million. The film collected ₹275 million net over its first weekend. For an Indian film featuring a female protagonist, the film recorded the highest opening weekend collections of all time. The film had a drop of 55% on its first Monday and went on to collect ₹36 million, making a four-day total of ₹305 million. The collections on Tuesday were of ₹33 million. It collected ₹400 million net in its first week. The film collected ₹110 million in its second week, crossing the ₹500 million mark at the domestic box-office. The film's domestic net collection was ₹61.43 crore (US$6.4 million). Mary Kom grossed ₹86.19 crore (US$9.0 million) globally and was a box office success.

== Awards ==
Mary Kom won the Best Popular Film Providing Wholesome Entertainment at the 62nd National Film Awards. At the 60th Filmfare Awards, the film was nominated for Best Film and Best Actress for Chopra. The film received eight nominations at the 21st Screen Awards, where it won Best Actress for Chopra. It received ten nominations at the Producers Guild Film Awards, including Best Film and Best Director and won five awards: Best Actress in a Leading Role for Chopra, Best Debut Director for Kumar, Dialogue of the Year, the President's Award for Best Film and Best Costume Design. Additionally, it was nominated for the Best Film and Best Actress at the 16th IIFA Awards, winning the Best Debut Director for Kumar.

== See also ==
- List of boxing films
- Bollywood and Manipur
