= Bollywood and Manipur =

Manipur's influence on Bollywood

The connection between the Indian film industry, Bollywood (Hindi language cinema), and the state of Manipur, is about how Manipur's culture, stories, and scenery are portrayed in Bollywood movies. There are challenges filmmakers face in accurately representing the state. Additionally, the involvement of Manipuri artists in Bollywood also plays an important factor.

Raj Nartaki (The Court Dancer, 1941) is one of the earliest Bollywood movies made on the history of Manipur kingdom

== Bollywood movies about Manipur ==
=== Raj Nartaki (1941) ===
Raj Nartaki (English: The Court Dancer) is a 1941 Bollywood movie directed by Modhu Bose under the Wadia Movietone banner. The story is set in the early 19th century in the Manipur Kingdom and is about social barriers between a court dancer and a prince (Chandrakirti Singh) of the Ningthouja dynasty. The movie shows Manipuri classical dance performances.

=== Mary Kom (2014) ===
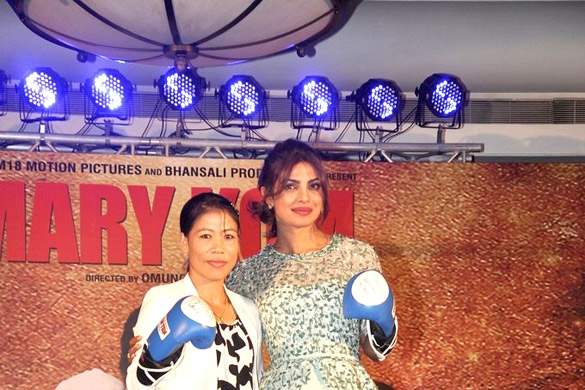
Priyanka Chopra and Mary Kom during the promotion of the movie Mary Kom

Mary Kom is a 2014 Bollywood biographical sports film based on the life of the eponymous boxer Mary Kom, a sportsperson from Manipur. It is directed by Omung Kumar.

=== Penalty (2019) ===
Penalty is a 2019 Bollywood movie about a football lover named Lukram from Manipur. It shows Kay Kay Menon besides main role, Lukram Smil in lead roles. It is directed by Shubham Singh.

=== The Diary of Manipur (2025) ===
The Diary of Manipur is a 2025 upcoming Bollywood movie about the story of a violence in Manipur. Veteran actor Anupam Kher took the role of the army officer, with other notable actors like Deepak Tijori, Mukesh Tiwari, and Amit Rao. The project has a production budget of 20 crores INR.

== Bollywood artists from Manipur ==
=== Lin Laishram ===
Lin Laishram appeared in Bollywood films like Mary Kom and Rangoon. In 2015, she starred in Umrika, directed by Prashant Nair, playing a Nepali girl alongside Prateik Babbar. She became more recognized in the Bollywood industry after her role in the popular Netflix comedy-drama Axone in 2020.

=== Priyakanta Laishram ===
Priyakanta Laishram appeared in AIB's (All India Bakchod) music video The Bollywood Diva (2017), which starred Kangana Ranaut and was directed by Tanmay Bhatt.

=== Lukram Smil ===
Lukram Smil made his Bollywood debut in the movie Penalty, directed by Subham Singh in 2017. He also appeared in the 2022 Lionsgate Play Originals series Jugaadistan.

=== Loitongbam Dorendra ===
Loitongbam Dorendra is known for playing the role of Tiger Sanga in the 2022 Bollywood film Anek, starring Ayushmann Khurrana and directed by Anubhav Sinha.

=== Bijou Thaangjam ===
Bijou Thaangjam has appeared in several Bollywood movies, including Mary Kom, Shivaay, Penalty, Jagga Jasoos, Happy Phirr Bhag Jayegi, Made In China, and The Test Case, among others.

== Meitei clothing ==
In 2024, Bollywood actress Sunny Leone, wearing traditional Meitei women's clothes, including Phanek, walked as a fashion showstopper for Manipuri fashion brand, House of Ali, led by fashion designers, Alimuddin and Daya Oinam.

Manushi Chhillar, a Bollywood actress and a Miss World 2017 winner, wearing traditional Meitei women's dressings, walked as a fashion showstopper at the Manipur Fashion Extravaganza 2022 (MFE) in Imphal.

Bollywood actress Sushmita Sen, wearing traditional Meitei clothes, walked as a fashion showstopper for Manipuri designer Robert Naorem at the Sangai Festival 2022. Besides, in several other occasions, she is known for wearing traditional Meitei women's dressings, like Phanek and Innaphi.

Bollywood actress Kangana Ranaut is also known for wearing traditional Meitei women's dresses, like phanek and enaphi in several occasions.

== Ban on Bollywood movies ==
Bollywood movies or Hindi language movies are banned from being released in the cinema halls of Manipur, by some local groups. The purpose of the ban is to protect, preserve and promote the film industry of Manipuri language cinema, from being superseded by the bigger film industry, like Bollywood. Before the ban was imposed, the last Bollywood movie that was released in Imphal was the actor Shahrukh Khan starrer movie Kuch Kuch Hota Hai in 1998. The ban was so strong that even the Bollywood movie made on the story of a Manipur based athlete Mary Kom was banned from being released in Manipur.

== See also ==
- Hollywood and the United Kingdom
- 1st Eikhoigi Imphal International Film Festival
- 2nd Eikhoigi Imphal International Film Festival
