= Meitei headwear =

Headgears in Meitei civilization

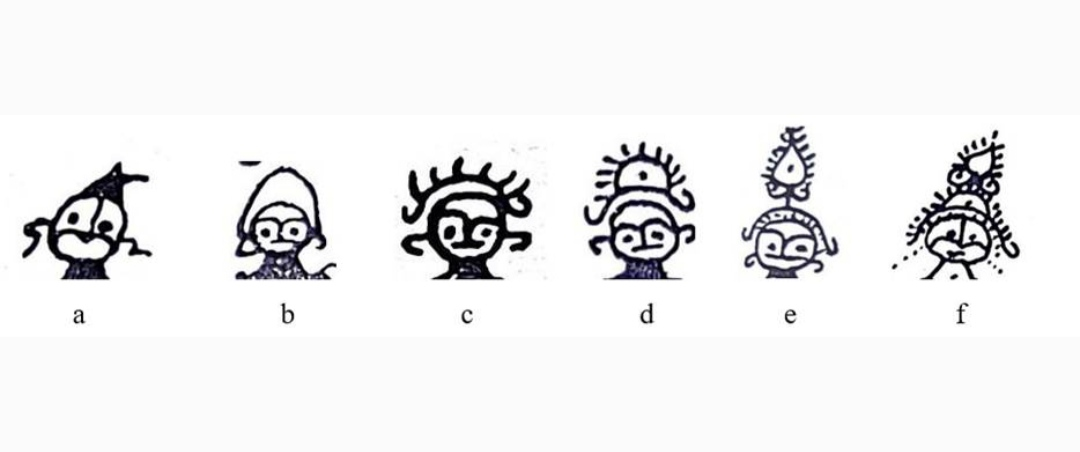
Depictions of traditional Meitei headgear in the Subika Laisaba manuscript

Meitei headwear is the traditional range of hats and headdresses originating in the Meitei community of Manipur, India and used in a variety of cultural, religious, and ceremonial contexts, including festivals, dance performances, weddings, and official functions. Each type of headgear is characterized by distinct structural and symbolic features, often associated with specific roles, gender, or occasions. Notable examples include the Kokyet, Kajenglei, and Samjin, each of which holds particular significance within the cultural and religious framework of Meitei society, including its indigenous belief system, Sanamahism.

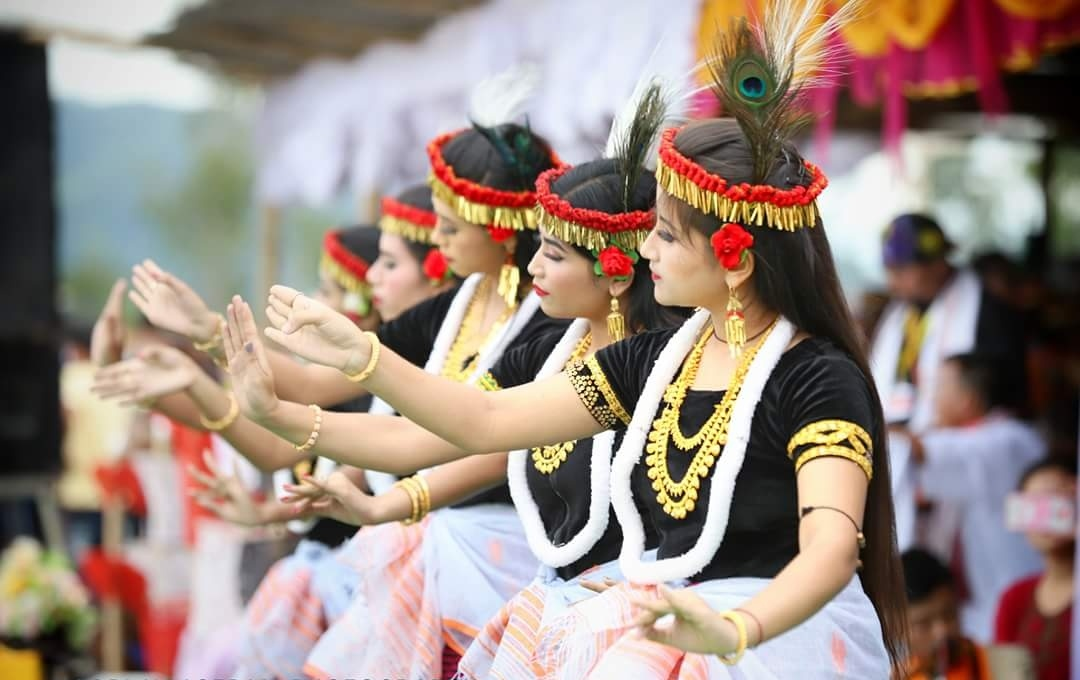
Meitei ladies wearing Kajenglei

== Kajenglei ==
The kajenglei (ꯀꯖꯦꯡꯂꯩ), or leitreng (ꯂꯩꯇ꯭ꯔꯦꯡ), is a traditional crown-like headdress worn by Meitei women. It is typically worn during weddings and in classical dance performances. It composed of approximately eighty to one hundred brass strips sewn to one centimetre wide red flannel bands and arranged around a metal ring.

== Kokyet ==
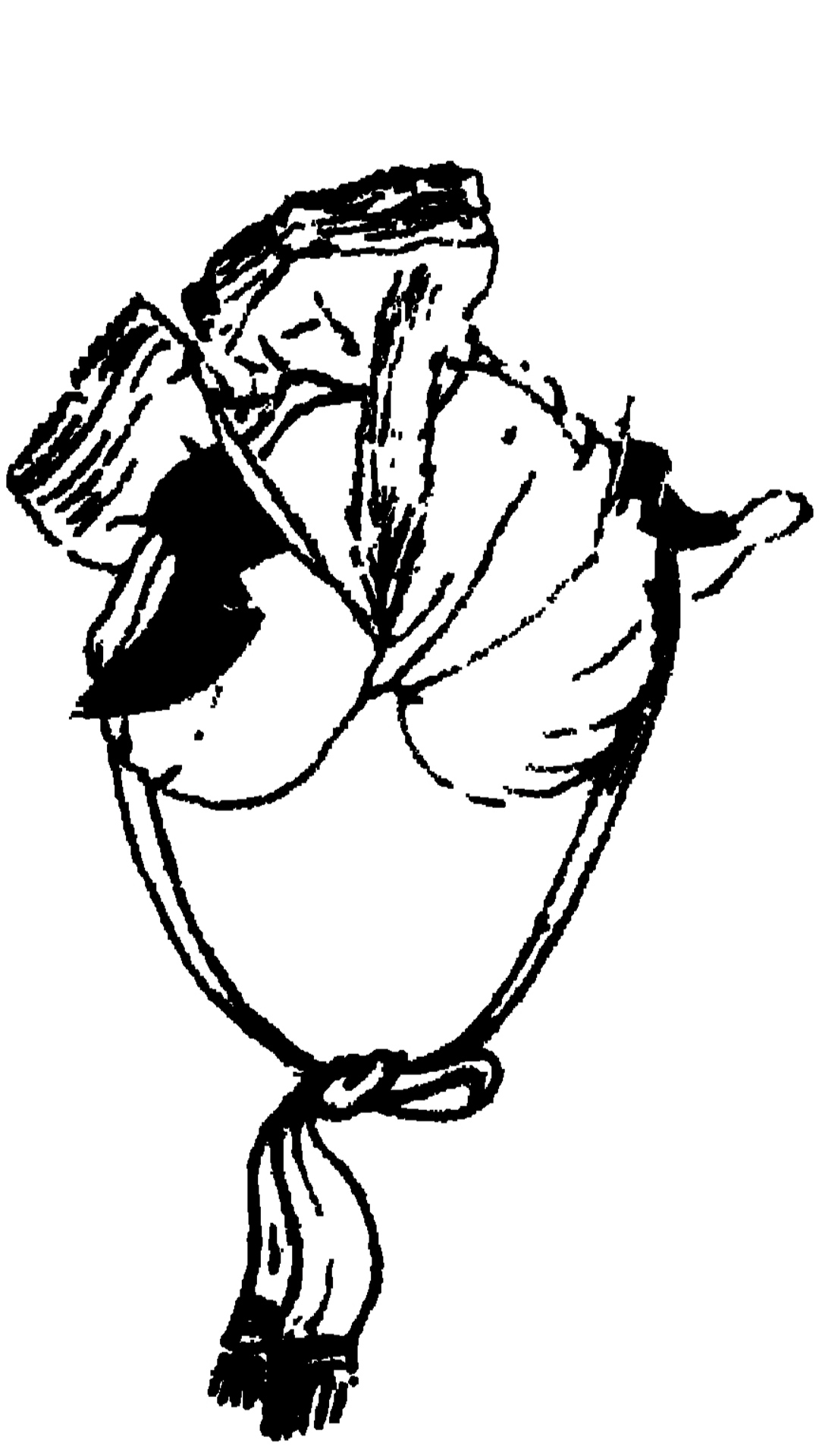
A special Meitei men's headgear, decorated with flags, reserved for champions of the Thang Ta martial art performances

The kokyet (ꯀꯣꯛꯌꯦꯠ) is a traditional Meitei turban. It is produced in twelve distinct designs and is worn during various cultural ceremonies, festivals, and formal occasions. It is worn by men of all social strata, from commoners to members of the royal family. Its design is represents the two horns of the ancient Meitei deity Pakhangba. It also functions as a symbolic representation of Sidaba, a central deity in the traditional Meitei religion, Sanamahism.

Since 2023, the Kokyet has been incorporated into the official uniform of marshals serving in the Indian Parliament, encompassing both the Lok Sabha and the Rajya Sabha. The adoption of the headdress was authorized by the Union Government of India.

== Samjin ==
The samjin (ꯁꯝꯖꯤꯟ) is a traditional male headdress associated with the reign of King Meidingu Khuyoi Tompok. It features intricate needlework and tassels hanging from the front and back. Its shape is believed to represent the horned head of the Meitei deity, Pakhangba.

== Usage by notable people ==
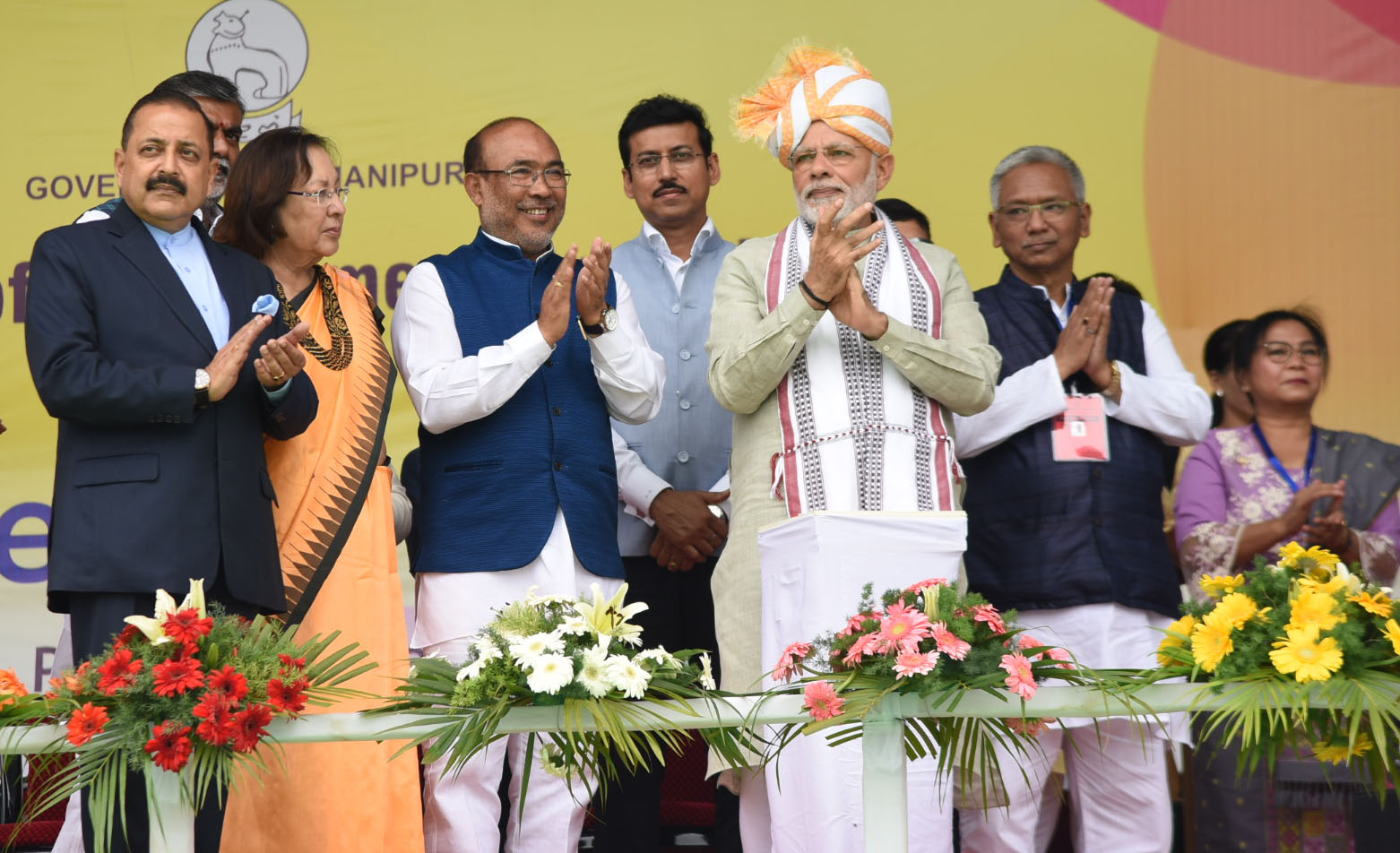
Prime Minister, Narendra Modi in traditional kokyet in 2018

In 2017, during a visit to election-bound Manipur, Prime Minister Narendra Modi wore traditional Meitei attire, including cloak a kokyet adorned with a peacock plume.

In 2022, Manipur Chief Minister N. Biren Singh presented Modi with a white kokyet embroidered in saffron and decorated witrh a gold brooch and a matching block-printed shawl.

== See also ==
- Meitei clothing
  - Meitei clothing in Myanmar
- Meitei royal etiquette
- Women in Meitei civilisation
- Manipur and Bollywood
