= Phanek =

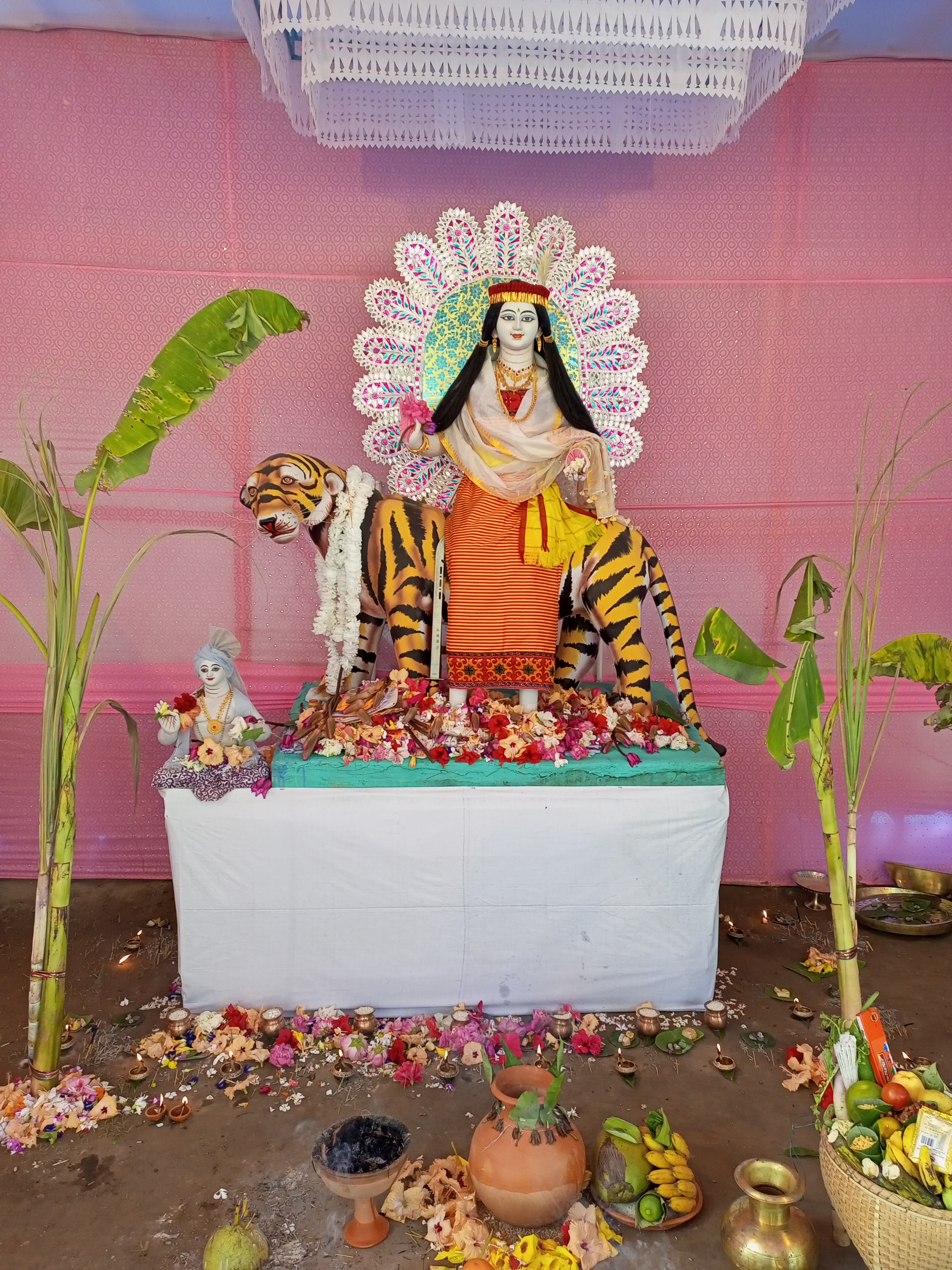
Panthoibi, a Meitei goddess, wearing a phanek

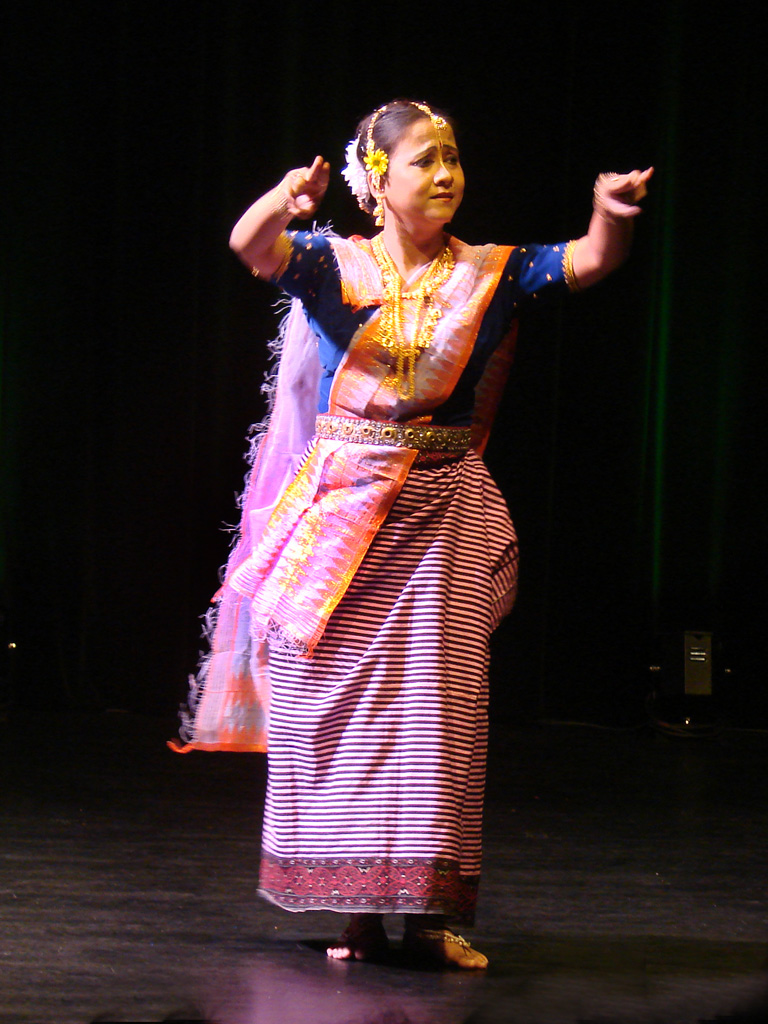
A Manipuri dancer, wearing a phanek

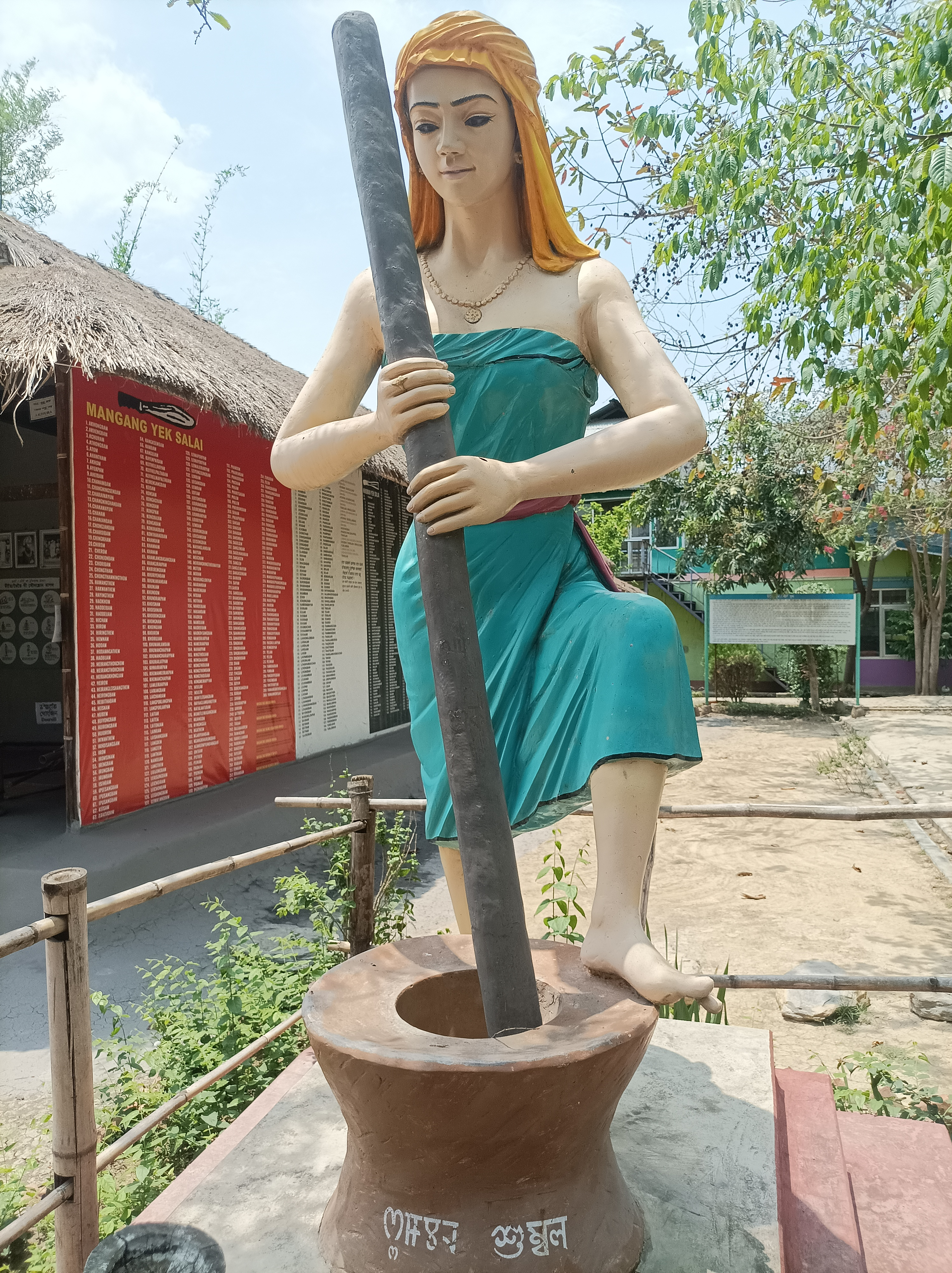
A sculpture of a Meitei woman in a plain phanek

Phanek (ꯐꯅꯦꯛ) or Fanek is a traditional Meitei clothing, indigenously worn by women, in Manipur (Kangleipak). One ancient design is the lotus and the bee bordering the phanek fabric. The Phanek Mayek Naibi, one of the most popular phaneks, is one such lower garment, which has stripes at its bottom. It is worn when one goes to office works and in marriage ceremonies. It is worn like a wraparound. Its bottom is adorned with heavy embroidery in different designs. According to Meitei culture, the phaneks are untouchable to the menfolk.

A phanek is a traditional wraparound skirt worn by the Meitei people of Manipur, India, as well as the Meitei diaspora worldwide. It is part of women’s clothing and is known for its distinct weaving patterns and motifs. These designs vary by community, reflecting regional traditions, history, and cultural identity.

== Similar traditions ==
Similar lower-body garments are found in other parts of Northeast India. For example, the mekhla is worn in Assam and the puan in Mizoram. Each group expresses its ethnic heritage through the colors and weaving styles of such clothing.

=== Variations among ethnicities ===
In Manipur, different tribes have their own names and patterns for this type of skirt:

- Among the Kukis, it is called ponve
- Among Kabuis (also known as Rongmeis), it is called pheisoi
- Among the Tangkhuls, it is called kashan
- Among the Anals, it is called lungvin

These local names and styles show the cultural diversity in the region.

== Cultural significance ==
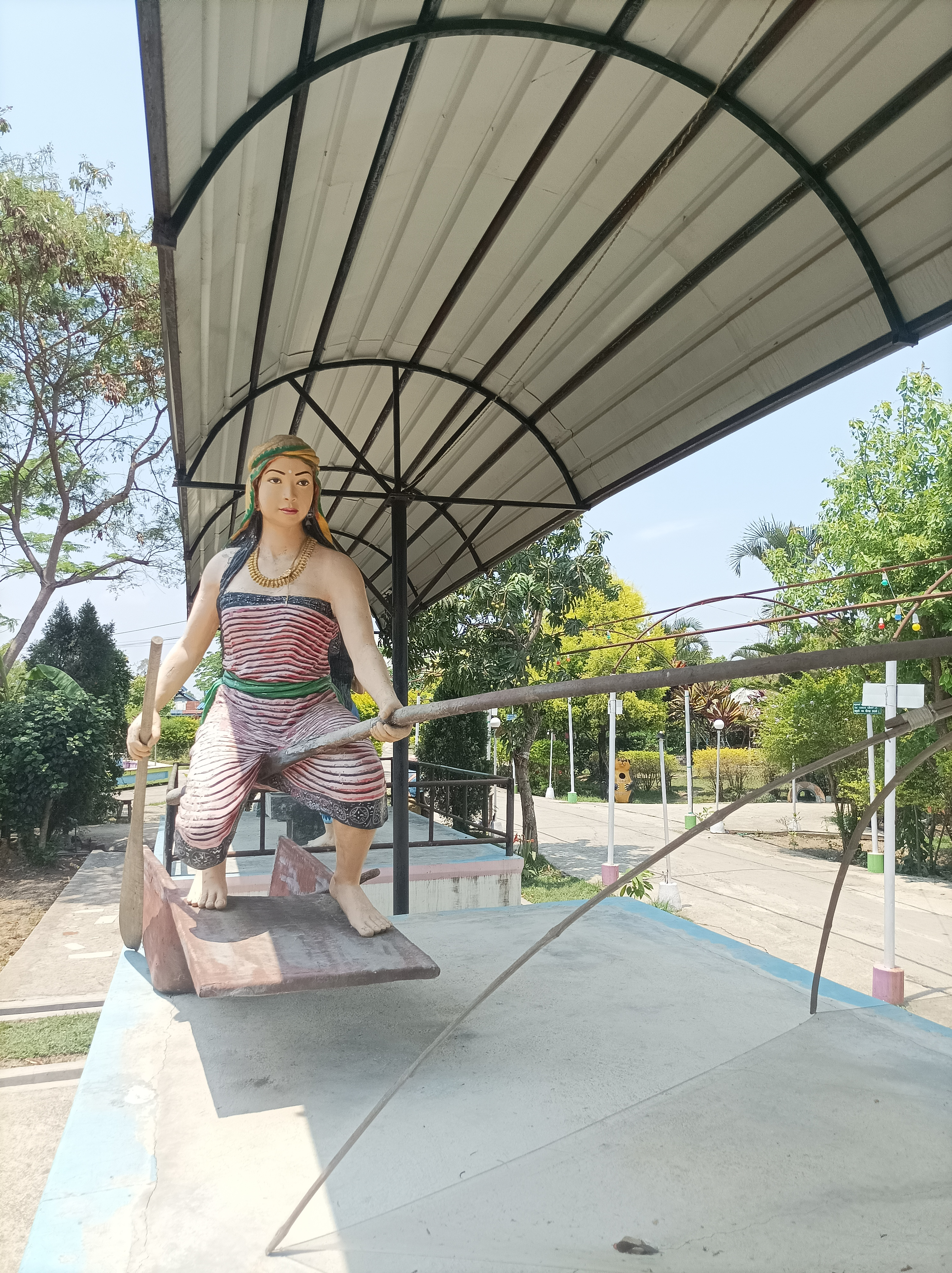
A sculpture of a Meitei fisherwoman, in phanek clothing

In Meitei civilisation, the phanek is considered sacred. Its patterns often include symbols from Meitei mythology, Meitei folklore, nature, and historical stories. Traditionally, women weave the phanek, although in recent times, men have also taken up weaving. The garment reflects the community's artistic and cultural values.

The phanek is more than clothing. It has become a symbol of femininity and women's agency. However, this also highlights the mixed views on gender roles in society.

== Sacred and taboo ==
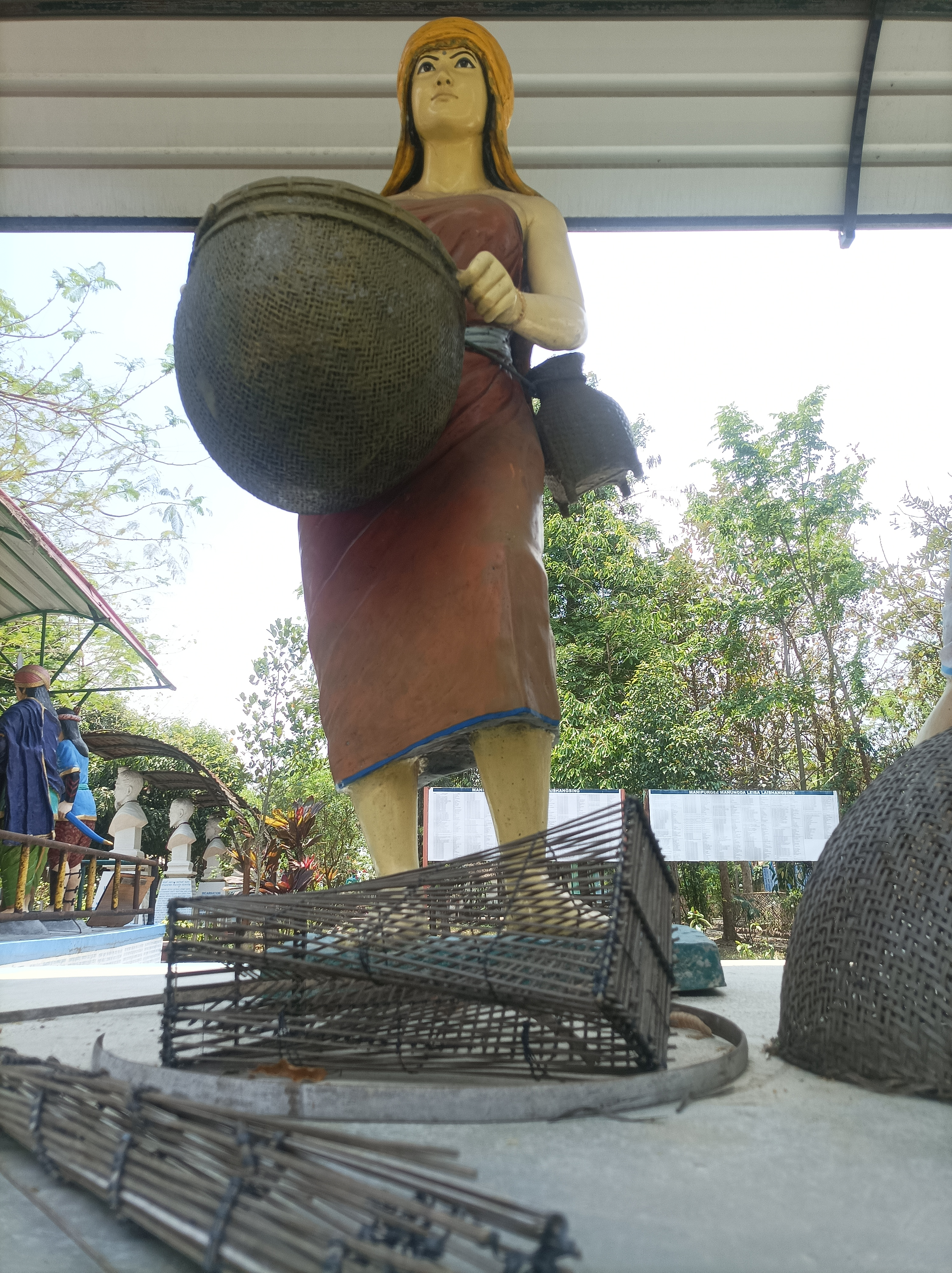
Sculpture of a Meitei fisherwoman in phanek clothing

The phanek holds a special, yet paradoxical, place in Meitei civilization. It represents care and life, often linked to feminine virtues. A well-known story is about the queen of Sugnu, who used a phanek to save people from execution by covering them with it, which symbolized giving them a new life.

In the past, a separate court for women, known as the pacha court, existed in Manipur. The wife of the Sugnu chief had the authority to change a death sentence to a life sentence using this symbolic gesture.

Phaneks made of muga silk are used in sacred rituals such as child ear-piercing ceremonies and communal feasts. Different types are used for daily wear, formal occasions, dances, and religious events.

== Weaving tradition ==
Weaving phaneks has traditionally been a skill passed down among women. It was an important way to earn income and gain some economic independence. Girls were expected to learn this craft from a young age.

== Taboos and beliefs ==
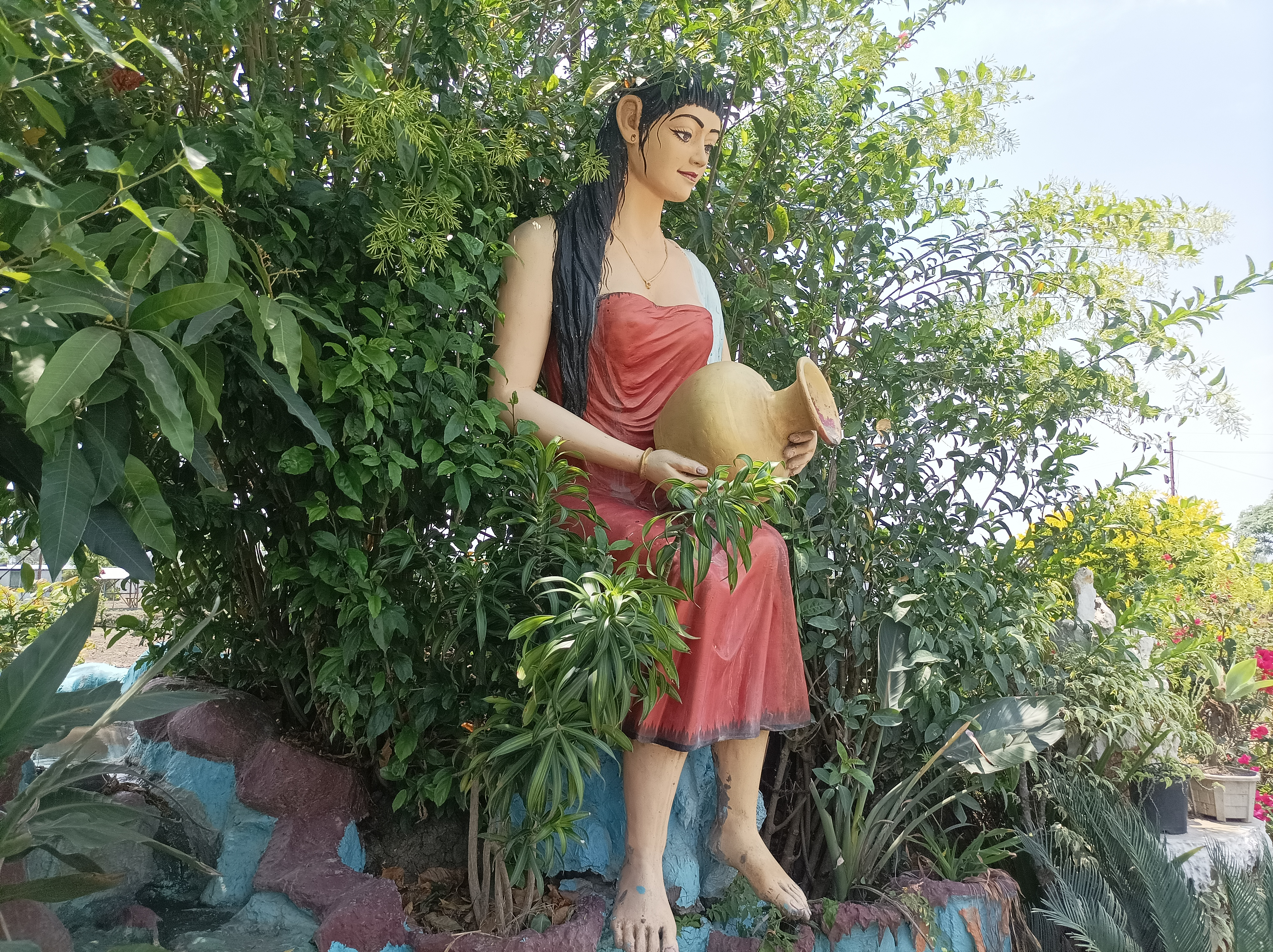
A mother goddess of the Classical Meitei religion (Sanamahism) in phanek

Certain beliefs about the phanek suggest fear or mistrust. It was considered bad luck to wash it with men's clothes or hang it in the open, where a man might touch or pass under it. It was believed such contact could bring harm to men.

One example is phanek bashing, where men are hit with a phanek as a form of punishment and humiliation. This act is believed to take away a man’s masculinity and is used symbolically in protests. While this shows the emotional power of the garment, it also continues some traditional gender roles.

== Symbol of protest ==
The phanek has also become a symbol of protest and political resistance in Manipur. Women in the state have led major protests, often while wearing phaneks.

=== Nupi Lan movements ===
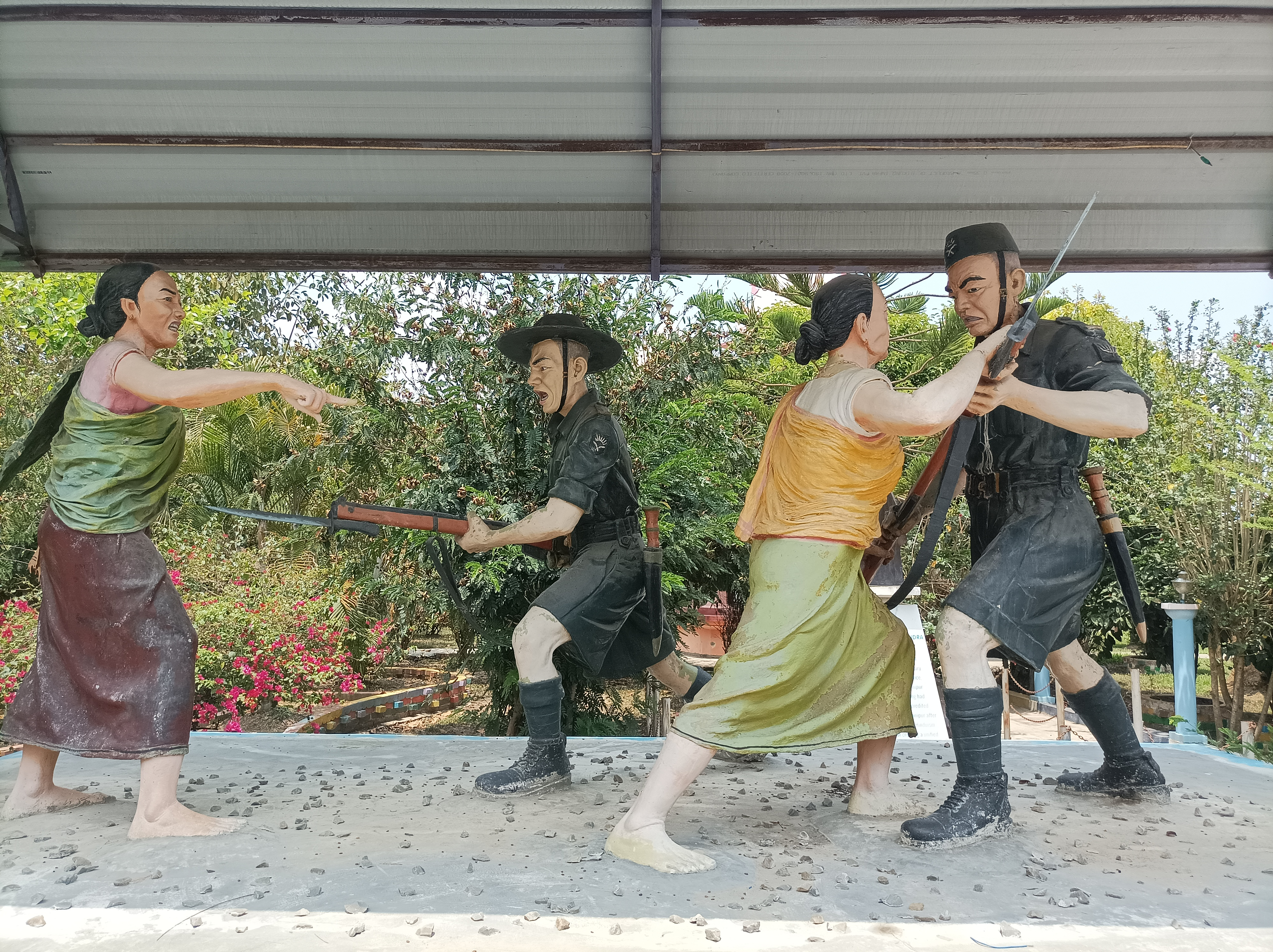
Depiction of Meitei women in the nupi lan movements, wearing phanek

The nupi lan (transl. women's wars) are key examples:

- Nupi Lan I (1904): Women opposed the British political agent's attempt to reintroduce lallup, a forced labor system.
- Nupi Lan II (1939): Women protested against rice export policies that led to high prices and food shortages.

In these movements, women wearing phaneks stood up to colonial power. Many lost their lives, and their actions are remembered in public art and memory.

=== Meira Paibi movement ===
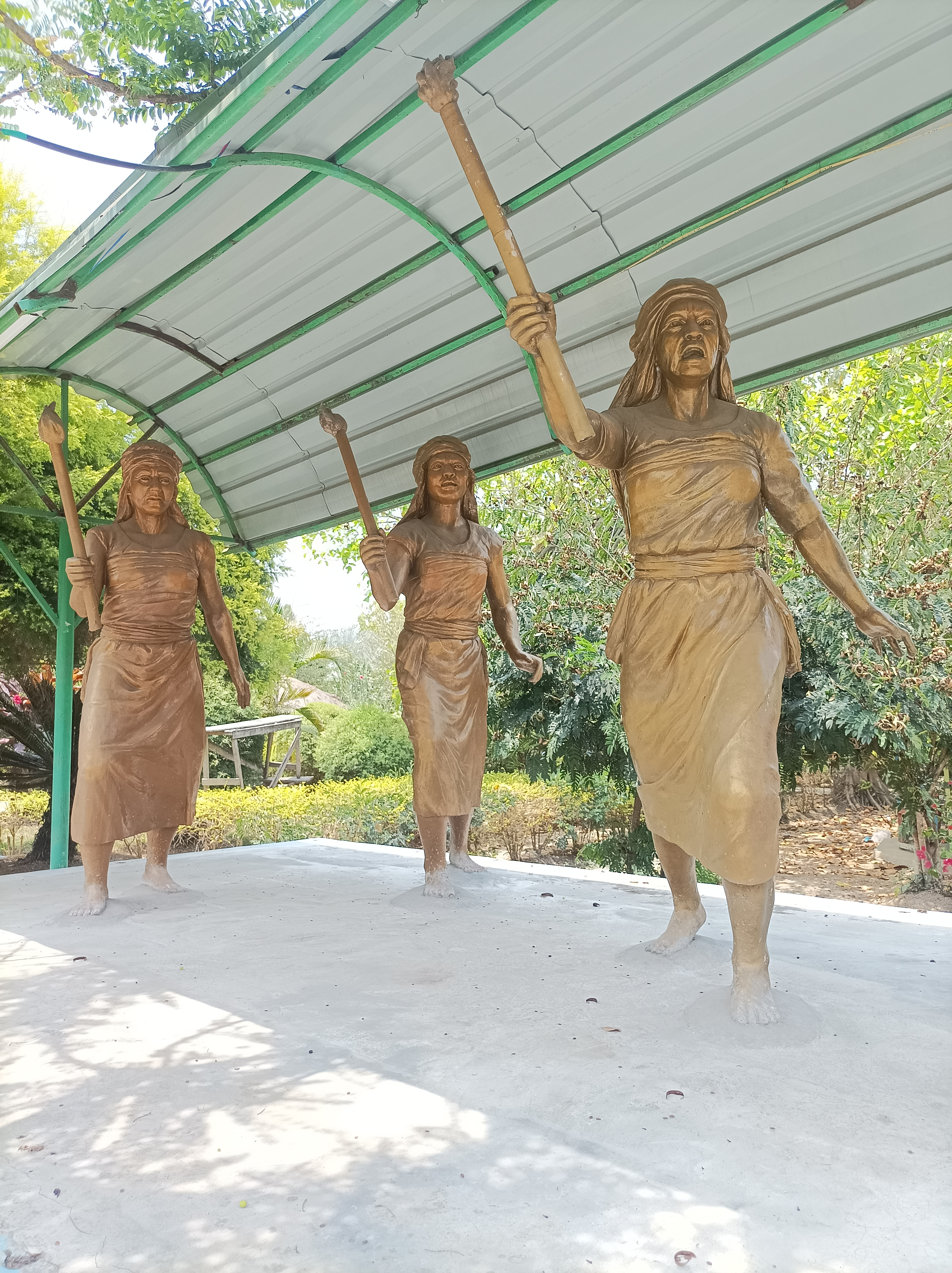
Sculptures of Meira Paibis in phanek clothings

The Meira Paibis (transl. women with torches) are grassroots groups formed in the 1970s. They patrol communities to prevent alcohol use and protest against military and human rights violations. Their activism also uses the symbolic power of the phanek.

=== Nude Protest at Kangla Fort ===
In 2004, twelve women protested in front of Kangla Fort by removing their phaneks after the rape and murder of Thangjam Manorama by Indian security forces. This powerful act reversed traditional ideas of modesty to protest state violence. Their banner read, “Indian army rape us,” confronting the idea that the state protects its citizens.

Phaneks are also hung across streets during blockades to symbolize protest. This use highlights both the cultural and political meaning of the garment.

== Negotiating identity and gender ==
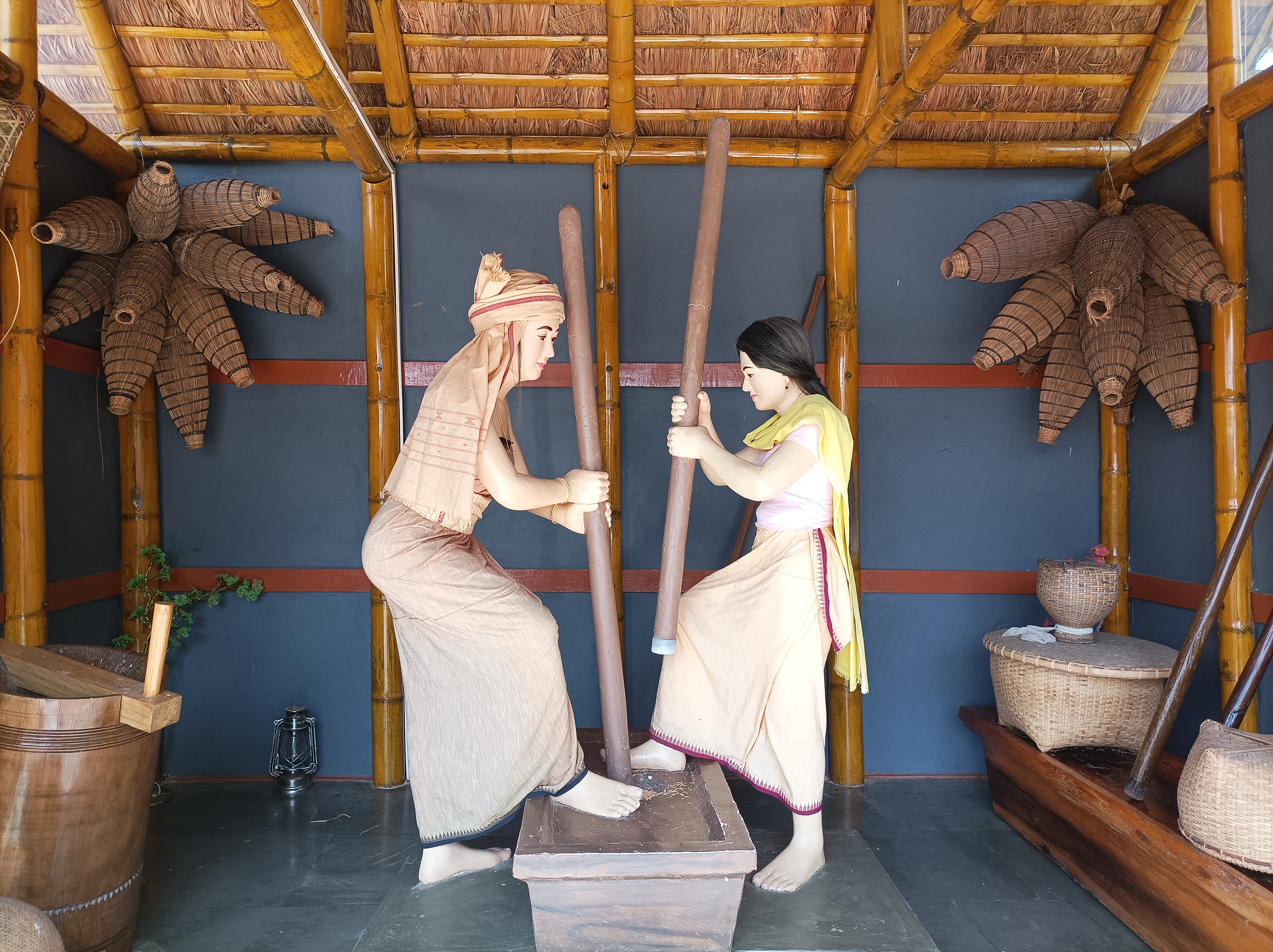
Sculptures of two Meitei working women in phanek clothings

The phanek represents both empowerment and limitations. Meitei women are respected for their activism, but the figure of the ima (mother) often becomes the only accepted symbol of female power. This narrows the space for other gender identities.

The phanek is used to show cultural pride and define morality. As such, it is used to set rules on how women and gender minorities should behave. For example:

- Some groups push for schoolgirls to wear phaneks
- Transwomen (Meitei: nupi manbi) are sometimes banned from wearing them
- In some cases, those who break these rules receive threats

These actions are criticized as moral policing and attempts to control culture through narrow ideas of identity.

== Legacy ==
The phanek reflects many sides of Meitei civilization: tradition and protest, pride and control, empowerment and restriction. It stands at the center of debates about gender, culture, and identity in Manipur.

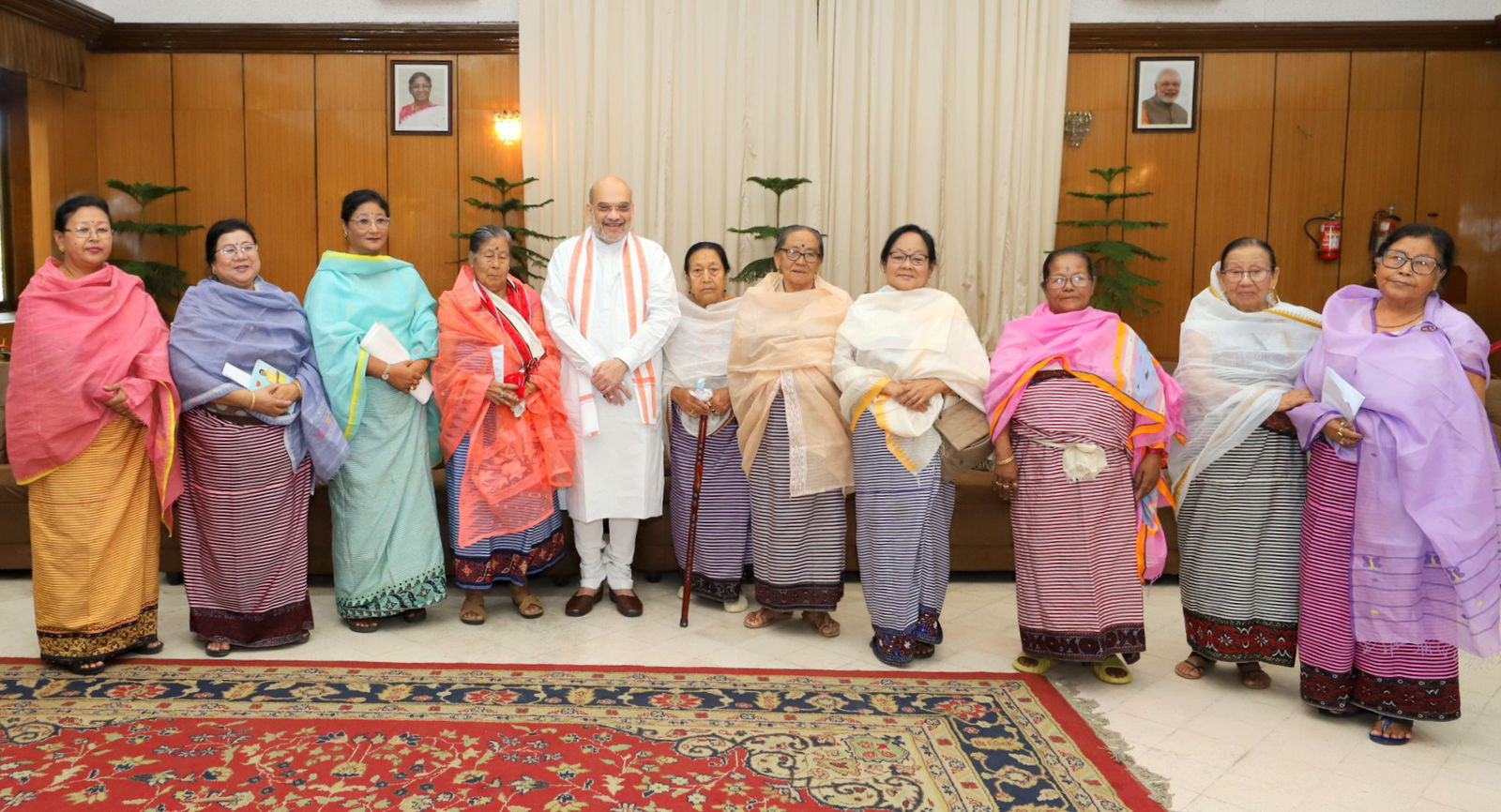
A group of Meira Paibi team in phanek

== See also ==
- Meitei clothing in Myanmar
- Meitei headgears

== Bibliography ==
- Bora, Papori. ‘Between the Human, the Citizen and the Tribal.’ In International Feminist Journal of Politics 12 (2010): 341–360.
- Brara, Vijayalakshmi N. ‘Performance: The Gendered Space in Manipur.’ In The Peripheral Centre: Voices from India’s Northeast, edited by Preeti Gill. New Delhi: Zubaan Publications, 2013.
- Brown, R (F.R.C.S.E.). Statistical Account of the native state of Manipur and the hill territory under its rule. Calcutta: Office of the Superintendent of Government Printing, 1873.
- Grosz, Elizabeth. ‘Sexual Difference and the Problem of Essentialism.’ In Inscriptions 5 (1989).
- Parratt, John, and Saroj N. Arambam Parratt. ‘The Second “Women's War” and the Emergence of Democratic Government in Manipur.’ Modern Asian Studies 35, no. 4 (Oct, 2001): 905–919.
- Lamabam, Damodar Singh. ‘Makers of Indian Literature: L. Kamal Singh.’ New Delhi: Sahitya Akademi, 2000.
- Ray, Panchali. ‘Political motherhood and a spectacular resistance: (Re) examining the Kangla Fort Protest, Manipur.’ In South Asian History and Culture 9, no. 4 (October 2018): 435–448.
- Sharma, Ditilekha. Nations, Communities, Conflict and Queer Lives. Delhi: Zubaan Publications in collaboration with Sasakawa Peace Foundation, 2019.
- Soibam, Haripriya. ‘From the Shackles of Tradition: Motherhood and Women’s agitation in Manipur.’ In Geographies of Difference: Exploration in Northeast Indian Studies, edited by Mélanie Vandenhelsken, Meenaxi Barkataki-Ruscheweyh, Bengt G. Karlsson, 215–232. London: Routledge, 2018.
- Yambem, Sanamani. ‘Nupi Lan: Manipur Women's Agitation 1939.’ In Economic and Political Weekly 11, no. 8 (Feb 21, 1976): 325–331.
