= Producers Guild Film Award for Best Debut Director =

Annual Indian film award

- Awarded for: Best Direction by a Debut Director
- Country: India
- Presented by: Film & Television Producers Guild
- First award: 2004 (for performances in films released around 2003)
- Currently held by: Neeraj Ghaywan, Masaan (2016)
- Website: Producers Guild Film Awards

The Producers Guild Film Award for Best Debut Director (previously known as the Apsara Award for Best Debut Director) is given by the producers of the film and television guild as part of its annual award ceremony for Hindi films, to recognise the work of new directors. Following its inception in 2004, no one was awarded in 2005 and from 2007-09.

== Winners ==
=== 2000s ===
- 2004
  Chandraprakash Dwivedi – Pinjar, Nikhil Advani – Kal Ho Naa Ho and Rajkumar Hirani – Munna Bhai M.B.B.S.
- 2005
  No award
- 2006
  Pradeep Sarkar – Parineeta
- 2007
  No award
- 2008
  No award
- 2009
  No award

=== 2010s ===
- 2010
  Ayan Mukerji – Wake Up Sid
- 2011
  Maneesh Sharma – Band Baaja Baaraat
- 2012
  No award
- 2013
  Gauri Shinde – English Vinglish
- 2014
  Ritesh Batra – The Lunchbox
- 2015
  Omung Kumar – Mary Kom
  Abhishek Varman - 2 States
  Shashank Khaitan - Humpty Sharma Ki Dulhania
  Nitin Kakkar - Filmistaan
- 2016 Neeraj Ghaywan - Masaan

== See also ==
- Producers Guild Film Awards
- Producers Guild Film Award for Best Male Debut
- Producers Guild Film Award for Best Female Debut
