= Producers Guild Film Award for Best Costume Design =

Annual Indian film award

The Producers Guild Film Award for Best Costume Design is an accolade given annually by the Producers Guild Film Awards for best costume design in a film.

Year	Winner	Film
2004	Munnesh Sappel	Pinjar
2006	Subarna Ray Chadhuri	Parineeta
2008	Karan Johar, Manish Malhotra & Sanjeev Mulchandani	Om Shanti Om
2009	Neeta Lulla	Jodhaa Akbar
2011	Niharika Khan	Band Baaja Baaraat
2012	Payal Saluja	7 Khoon Maaf
