= Producers Guild Film Awards =

Indian film and television accolade

Producers Guild Film & Television Awards
- Awarded for: Excellence in Hindi film and television by members of the Producers Guild
- Country: India
- First award: 2004
- Final award: 2016
- Website: Producers Guild Film Awards

Television/radio coverage
- Network: Sony TV; Imagine TV; Colors; Star Plus
- Produced by: Wizcraft International Entertainment Pvt. Ltd.

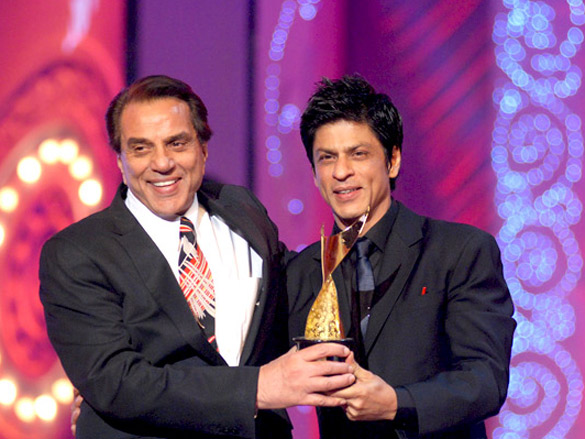
Shahrukh Khan receiving the award for best actor in 2011

The Producers Guild Film Awards, previously known as the Apsara Awards and the Star Guild Awards is an award event hosted by the Producers Guild of India to recognise excellence in Hindi film and television. Originated by filmmaker and scholar Amit Khanna in 2004, the Guild Awards were one of the major award events from 2004 till 2016, when the last awards ceremony happened. The 22-karat gold statuette was sculpted and designed by the jewellery brand Tanishq and was "inspired by the rich heritage of one of India's most treasured possessions – the Ajanta and Ellora Caves." Nominations for the awards come from selected members of the guild, with the full membership (around 160) available to vote for the winners. The ballots cast by the guild members are then taken to a common venue for the final counting.

== History ==
The first ceremony was held on 28 May 2004 in Mumbai, India to honour outstanding film and television achievements of the 2003–04 film and television season. While the award ceremonies are usually held at the beginning of the subsequent year, the fourth edition of the award ceremony (2008–09) was postponed to the end of the year as a sign of respect to the victims of the 2008 Mumbai attacks.

== List of nominees and winners ==
- For the year 2003, held in 2004 – Nominees and Winners
- For the year 2004, held in 2005 – Not held
- For the year 2005, held in 2006 – Nominees and Winners
- For the year 2006, held in 2007 – Not held
- For the year 2007, held in 2008 – Nominees and Winners
- For the year 2008, held in 2009 – Nominees and Winners
- For the year 2009, held in 2010 – Nominees and Winners
- For the year 2010, held in 2011 – Nominees and Winners
- For the year 2011, held in 2012 – Nominees and Winners
- For the year 2012, held in 2013 – Nominees and Winners
- For the year 2013, held in 2014 – Nominees and Winners
- For the year 2014, held in 2015 – Nominees and Winners
- For the year 2015, held in 2016 – Nominees and Winners

== Hosts ==
Year	Host
2008	Javed Jaffrey
2010	Arjun Rampal, Ayushmann Khurrana and Preity Zinta
2011	Sajid Khan
2012	Karan Johar and Farah Khan
2013	Salman Khan
2014	Salman Khan
2015	Kapil Sharma and Parineeti Chopra

== Film awards ==
=== Merit awards ===
- Best Film
- Best Director
- Best Actor in a Leading Role
- Best Actress in a Leading Role
- Best Actor in a Supporting Role
- Best Actress in a Supporting Role
- Best Actor in a Negative Role
- Best Actor in a Comic Role
- Best Male Debut
- Best Female Debut
- Best Debut Director
- Music Director
- Best Lyricist
- Best Male Playback Singer
- Best Female Playback Singer

=== Best Story ===
Year	Name	Film
2006	Nagesh Kukunoor	Iqbal
2008	Jaideep Sahni	Chak De India
2009	Amole Gupte	Taare Zameen Par
2010	Imtiaz Ali	Love Aaj Kal
2011	Anusha Rizvi	Peepli Live
2012	Zoya Akhtar, Reema Kagti	Zindagi Na Milegi Dobara
2013	Juhi Chaturvedi	Vicky Donor
2014	Prasoon Joshi	Bhaag Milkha Bhaag
2015	Vikas Bahl, Chaitally Parmar, Parveez Shaikh	Queen
2016	V. Vijayendra Prasad	Bajrangi Bhaijaan

=== Best Screenplay ===
Year	Name	Film
2004	Rajkumar Hirani, Vidhu Vinod Chopra, Lajan Joseph	Munnabhai MBBS
2006	Sanjay Leela Bhansali, Prakash Kapadia, Bhavani Iyer	Black
2008	Jaideep Sahni	Chak De India
2009	Amole Gupte (tied with) Neeraj Pandey	Taare Zameen Par (tied with) A Wednesday!
2010	A. R. Murugadoss	Ghajini
2011	Rajat Arora	Once Upon a Time in Mumbai
2012	Zoya Akhtar, Reema Kagti	Zindagi Na Milegi Dobara
2013	Sujoy Ghosh	Kahaani
2014	Prasoon Joshi	Bhaag Milkha Bhaag
2015	Vikas Bahl, Chaitally Parmar, Parveez Shaikh	Queen
2016	Kabir Khan	Bajrangi Bhaijaan

=== Best Dialogues ===
Year	Name	Film
2006	Aditya Chopra	Veer Zaara
2008	Imtiaz Ali	Jab We Met
2009	Neeraj Pandey	A Wednesday!
2010	Anurag Kashyap	Dev D
2011	Abhinav Kashyap, Dilip Shukla	Dabangg
2012	Rajat Arora	The Dirty Picture
2013	Juhi Chaturvedi	Vicky Donor
2014	Hussain Dalal	Yeh Jawaani Hai Deewani
2015	Rajkumar Hirani, Abhijat Joshi	PK
2016	Prakash Kapadia	Bajirao Mastani

=== Best Editing ===
Year	Name	Film
2004	Rajkumar Hirani	Munnabhai MBBS
2006	Nipun Gupta	Sarkar
2008	Amitabh Shukla	Chak De India
2009	Shri Narayan Singh	A Wednesday!
2011	Namrata Rao	Band Baaja Baaraat
2012	Aarti Bajaj	No One Killed Jessica
2013	Namrata Rao	Kahaani
2014	Chandrashekhar Prajapati	Madras Cafe
2015	Anurag Kashyap, Abhijit Kokate	Queen

=== Best Cinematographer ===
Year	Name	Film
2004	Anil Mehta	Kal Ho Naa Ho
2006	Ravi K. Chandran	Black
2008	Rajiv Menon	Guru
2009	Kiran Deohans	Jodhaa Akbar
2011	Sudeep Chatterjee (tied with) Santosh Sivan and V. Manikandan	Guzaarish (tied with) Raavan
2012	Ranjan Palit (tied with) Chirantan Das	7 Khoon Maaf (tied with) Tanu Weds Manu
2013	Rajeev Ravi (tied with) Ravi Varman	Gangs of Wasseypur (tied with) Barfi!
2014	Binod Pradhan	Bhaag Milkha Bhaag
2015	Setu	Dedh Ishqiya
2016	Sudeep Chatterjee	Bajirao Mastani

=== Best Costume Design ===
Year	Name	Film
2004	Muneesh Sappel	Pinjar
2006	Subarna Ray Chaudhuri	Parineeta
2008	Manish Malhotra, Karan Johar, Sanjeev Mulchandani	Om Shanti Om
2009	Neeta Lulla	Jodhaa Akbar
2011	Niharika Khan	Band Baaja Baaraat
2012	Payal Saluja	7 Khoon Maaf
2013	Aki Narula; Shefalina	Barfi!
2014	Anju Modi, Maxima Basu	Goliyon Ki Raasleela Ram-Leela
2015	Payal Saluja (tied with) Isha Mantry, Rajat K. Tangry	Dedh Ishqiya (tied with) Mary Kom
2016	Anju Modi, Maxima Basu	Bajirao Mastani

=== Best Art Direction ===
Year	Name	Film
2004	Muneesh Sappel	Pinjar
2006	Omung Kumar	Black
2009	Nitin Chandrakant Desai	Jodhaa Akbar
2011	Sonal Chaudhary; T. B. Abid	Band Baaja Baaraat
2012	Subrata Chakravarthy; Punita Grover	7 Khoon Maaf
2013	Sharmishta Roy	Talaash: The Answer Lies Within
2014	Rashid Khan	Goliyon Ki Raasleela Ram-Leela
2015	Amit Ray; Subrata Chakravarthy	Dedh Ishqiya
2016	Sujeet Sawant; Shriram Iyengar; Saloni Dhatrak	Bajirao Mastani

=== Best Choreography ===
Year	Name	Song	Film
2006	Vaibhavi Merchant	"Kajra Re"	Bunty Aur Babli
2008	Farah Khan	"Dhoom Tana"	Om Shanti Om
2009	Chinni Prakash; Rekha Prakash	"Azeem us Shaan"	Jodhaa Akbar
2010	Shiamak Davar	"Dance Pe Chance"	Rab Ne Bana Di Jodi
2011	Farah Khan	"Sheila Ki Jawani"	Tees Maar Khan
2012	Bosco-Caesar	"Senorita"	Zindagi Na Milegi Dobara
2013	Ganesh Acharya	"Chikni Chameli"	Agneepath
2014	Remo D'Souza	"Badtameez Dil" "Balam Pichkari"	Yeh Jawaani Hai Deewani
2015	Bosco-Caesar	"Tu Meri"	Bang Bang!
2016	Remo D'Souza	"Pinga"	Bajirao Mastani

=== Best Special Effects ===
Year	Name	Film
2004	Bimmini Special Effects Studio; Digital Art Media	Koi Mil Gaya
2006	V. G. Samant	Hanuman
2008	Red Chillies VFX	Om Shanti Om
2011	Prime Focus	Guzaarish
2012	Red Chillies VFX	RA. One
2013	Tata Elxsi	Ek Tha Tiger
2014	Tata Elxsi (tied with) Red Chillies VFX	Dhoom 3 (tied with) Krrish 3
2015	Red Chillies VFX	Happy New Year
2016	Viral Thakkar	Bajirao Mastani

=== Best Sound Recording ===
Year	Name	Film
2004	Dwarak Warrier	Bhoot
2006	Resul Pookutty	Black
2009	Baylon Fonensca	Rock On!!
2011	Pritam Das	Love Sex Aur Dhokha

== Special awards ==
=== Lifetime Achievement ===
Year	Winners
2004	Dilip Kumar
2006	B. R. Chopra; Dev Anand
2008	Yash Chopra
2010	Amitabh Bachchan
2011	Dharmendra
2013	Manoj Kumar
2014	Salim Khan; Tanuja
2015	Rakesh Roshan
2016	Jeetendra

=== Entertainer of the Year ===
Year	Name	Film
2008	Akshay Kumar	Namastey London; Heyy Babyy; Bhool Bhulaiyaa; Welcome
2010	Ranbir Kapoor	Wake Up Sid; Ajab Prem Ki Ghazab Kahani; Rocket Singh: Salesman of the Year
2011	Shahrukh Khan; Katrina Kaif	My Name Is Khan; Raajneeti; Tees Maar Khan
2012	Shahrukh Khan; Priyanka Chopra	Ra.One; Don 2; 7 Khoon Maaf
2013	Priyanka Chopra	Agneepath; Barfi!
2014	Shahrukh Khan; Irrfan Khan	Chennai Express; The Lunch Box
2015	Deepika Padukone; Shraddha Kapoor	Finding Fanny; Happy New Year; Ek Villain; Haider; Ungli

=== Jodi of the Year ===
- Jodi of the Year: Salman Khan and Govinda (2008)
- Style Icon / Diva of the Year: Hrithik Roshan and Katrina Kaif (2008)
- Heartthrob of the Year: Shahid Kapoor and Deepika Padukone (2010)
- During the sixth edition of the award ceremony, four separate awards were also given to honour the films and performances of December 2009; this included: Vidhu Vinod Chopra winning the Best Film for 3 Idiots, Rajkumar Hirani for his direction of 3 Idiots, as well as Amitabh Bachchan and Vidya Balan for their performances in Paa.
- Cinematic Excellence: Sanjay Leela Bhansali, Hrithik Roshan and Aishwarya Rai (2011)
- Guild Hall of Fame: Aashiqui 2, Bhaag Milkha Bhaag, Chennai Express, Dhoom 3, Goliyon Ki Raasleela Ram-Leela, Grand Masti, Krrish 3, Race 2 and Yeh Jawaani Hai Deewani (2014)

== Television ==
=== Best Drama Series – Fiction ===
Year	Series	Producers/Production
2004	Jassi Jaisi Koi Nahin	DJ's a Creative Unit
2006	Astitva...Ek Prem Kahani	Ananda Films and Telecommunications Pvt. Ltd.
2010	Balika Vadhu	Sphere Origins
2011	Mann Kee Awaaz Pratigya	Pearl Grey
2012	Saath Nibhana Saathiya (tied with) Bade Achhe Lagte Hain	Rashmi Sharma (tied with) Balaji Telefilms
2013	Diya Aur Baati Hum (tied with) Madhubala Ek Ishq Ek Junoon	Shashi Sumeet Productions (tied with) Abhinav Shukla

=== Best Director – Fiction ===
Year	Name	Series
2004	Rohit Khanna	Jassi Jaisi Koi Nahin
2006	Deven Bhojani	Sarabhai vs Sarabhai
2010	Nandita Mehra	Uttaran
2012	Sangeeta Rao	Bade Achhe Lagte Hain
2013	Romesh Kolra	Yeh Rishta Kya Kehlata Hai
2014	Santram Varma	Jodha Akbar
2015	Rohit Jugraj	Ek Hasina Thi

- Best Actor in a Drama Series
- Best Actress in a Drama Series

=== Best Ongoing Drama Series ===
Year	Series	Producers/Production
2007	Kasautii Zindagii Kay	Balaji Telefilms
2012	Yeh Rishta Kya Kehlata Hai	Director's Kut Productions
2013	Bade Achhe Lagte Hain	Balaji Telefilms
2014	Balika Vadhu	Sphere Origins
2015	Diya Aur Baati Hum (tied with) Jodha Akbar (tied with) Yeh Rishta Kya Kehlata Hai	Shashi Sumeet Productions (tied with) Balaji Telefilms (tied with) Director's Kut Productions
2016	Yeh Rishta Kya Kehlata Hai	Director's Kut Productions

=== Best Non-Fiction Series ===
Year	Series	Producers/ Productions
2004	Big Story: Afghanistan	NDTV
2006	Kaun Banega Crorepati 2	Big Synergy
2010	10 Ka Dum	Big Synergy
2011	Entertainment Ke Liye Kuch Bhi Karega	Wizcraft International Entertainment Pvt. Ltd.
2012	Kaun Banega Crorepati 5	Big Synergy
2013	Crime Patrol	Optimystix Entertainment
2014	Bigg Boss 7	Endemol India
2015	Comedy Nights with Kapil	Kapil Sharma; Sol Production

=== Best Comedy Series ===
Year	Series	Producers/Production
2004	Office Office	Eagle Video Films
2005	Sarabhai vs Sarabhai	Hats Off Productions
2006	The Great Indian Laughter Challenge	Endemol India
2012	Lapataganj	Ashwini Dher
2013	Taarak Mehta Ka Ooltah Chashmah	Neela Telefilms
2014	Comedy Nights with Kapil	Kapil Sharma; Sol Production
2015	Taarak Mehta Ka Ooltah Chashmah	Neela Telefilms

=== Best Mythological Series ===
Year	Series	Production
2013	Devon Ke Dev...Mahadev	Triangle Film Company
2014	Mahabharat	Swastik Pictures

=== Best Ensemble Cast ===
Year	Series	Producers/Production
2003	Kasautii Zindagii Kay	Balaji Telefilms
2004	Kasautii Zindagii Kay	Balaji Telefilms
2005	Hum Paanch (season 2)	Balaji Telefilms
2006	Sarabhai vs Sarabhai	Hats Off Productions
2007	Kasautii Zindagii Kay	Balaji Telefilms
2008	Not Awarded	-
2009	Yeh Rishta Kya Kehlata Hai	Director's Kut Productions
2010	Tere Liye	Balaji Telefilms
2011	Uttaran	Film Farm India
2012	Sasural Genda Phool	Ravi Ojha Productions
2013	Balika Vadhu	Sphere Origins
2014	Mahabharat	Swastik Pictures
2015	Everest	Ashutosh Gowarikar

=== Best Writer ===
Year	Name	Series
2004	Sonali Bhonsle	Kasautii Zindagii Kay
2005	Zama Habib	Kkavyanjali
2006	Sonali Jaffer	Kaisa Ye Pyar Hai
2007	Sonali Jaffer	Kasamh Se
2009	Bhavna Vyas	Yeh Rishta Kya Kehlata Hai
2011	Purnendu Shekhar; Gajra Kottary Rajesh Dubey	Balika Vadhu
2012	Mitali	Uttaran
2013	Sonali Jaffer; Harneet	Bade Achhe Lagte Hain
2015	Bhavna Vyas; Munisha Rajpal	Yeh Rishta Kya Kehlata Hai
2016	Purnendu Shekhar; Gajra Kottary	Balika Vadhu

=== Special awards ===
- Best Production House: Balaji Telefilms (2003, 2005)
- Outstanding Contribution to Indian Television: Subhash Chandra (Zee Network) (2003)
- Outstanding Debut: Mona Singh for Jassi Jaissi Koi Nahin (2003)
- Best Marketing of Entertainment Product: Sony Entertainment Television (Jassi Jaissi Koi Nahin) (2003)
- Cinematic Excellence in Television: Amitabh Bachchan (2012)

== See also ==
- List of Asian television awards
