= Producers Guild Film Award for Best Director =

Annual Indian film award

- Awarded for: Best Direction by a Director
- Country: India
- Presented by: Film & Television Producers Guild
- First award: 2004 (for films released around 2003)
- Final award: 2016
- Currently held by: Sanjay Leela Bhansali, Bajirao Mastani (2016)
- Website: Producers Guild Film Awards

The Producers Guild Film Award for Best Director (previously known as the Apsara Award for Best Director) is given by the producers of the film and television guild as part of its annual award ceremony for Hindi films, to recognise the work of a film director. Following its inception in 2004, no one was awarded in 2005 and 2007.

== Superlatives ==
| Superlative | Best Director | | |
|---|---|---|---|
| Director with most awards | Sanjay Leela Bhansali | 2 | -- |
| Director with most nominations | Vishal Bhardwaj; Imtiaz Ali; Prakash Jha; Sanjay Leela Bhansali | 2 | |
| Director with most nominations (without ever winning) | Vishal Bhardwaj; Imtiaz Ali; Prakash Jha | 2 | |

== Winners ==
| Year | Director | Film |
|---|---|---|
| 2004 | Rakesh Roshan | Koi Mil Gaya |
| 2006 | Sanjay Leela Bhansali | Black |
| 2008 | Shimit Amin | Chak De India! |
| 2009 | Aamir Khan | Taare Zameen Par |
| 2010 | A. R. Murugadoss | Ghajini |
| 2011 | Karan Johar | My Name Is Khan |
| 2012 | Zoya Akhtar | Zindagi Na Milegi Dobara |
| 2013 | Anurag Basu (tied with) Sujoy Ghosh | Barfi! (tied with) Kahaani |
| 2014 | Rakeysh Omprakash Mehra | Bhaag Milkha Bhaag |
| 2015 | Vikas Bahl | Queen |
| 2016 | Sanjay Leela Bhansali | Bajirao Mastani |

== See also ==
- Producers Guild Film Awards
- Producers Guild Film Award for Best Film
- Producers Guild Film Award for Best Debut Director
- Producers Guild Film Award for Best Actor in a Leading Role
- Producers Guild Film Award for Best Actress in a Leading Role
