= Sunil Thapa =

Nepalese actor (1957–2026)

- सुनील थापा
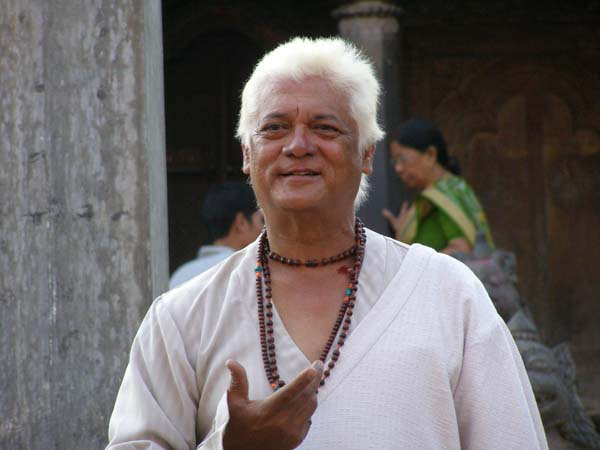
- Born: 19 May 1957; Dang, Nepal
- Died: 7 February 2026 (aged 68); Kathmandu, Nepal
- Other names: Ratey Kaila; Sher Singh/Dinesh Lamichhane
- Occupation: Actor
- Years active: 1974–2025
- Spouse: Rajani Limbu (Thapa)
- Children: 2

Sunil Thapa (Nepali: सुनील थापा; 19 May 1957 – 7 February 2026) was a Nepalese actor who appeared in Nepali, Bollywood and Bhojpuri films. He began his career with the Bollywood film Ek Duuje Ke Liye. He later appeared in notable productions including Mary Kom (2014), in which he played boxing coach Narjit Singh, and the web series The Family Man 3.

Thapa was widely known for his villainous and character roles, particularly in Nepali cinema, where he redefined the portrayal of antagonists. His most iconic role was as 'Rate Kaila' in the cult classic Chino (1989). Other notable Nepali films include Gorkha Paltan, Shikari, Papi Manche, Mukhauta, and Captain. He won several awards, including the Motion Pictures Award Nepal twice, and served as chairman of Everest Film Academy, mentoring emerging talent.

== Early life and career foundations ==
Sunil Thapa was born on 19 May 1957 in the Dang District of Nepal. In his youth, he moved to Mumbai (then Bombay), India, where he initially pursued diverse career paths outside of traditional acting. In 1974, he established himself as a prominent mainstream model, working for major Indian textile brands including Binny's and Mafatlal Fabrics.

In addition to modeling, Thapa was a highly skilled athlete during his early adulthood, playing professional competitive football as a sportsman for elite Indian sports institutions including the ICL Club Bombay and the Orkay's Sports Club.He simultaneously entered print media journalism, working as a professional photojournalist for JS Magazine (Junior Statesman). In this capacity, he notably traveled to cover the official Coronation of Jigme Singye Wangchuck, the fourth King of Bhutan, in 1974. These experiences in modeling, athletics, and media photojournalism provided the foundation for his entry into commercial South Asian cinema, leading to his Bollywood acting debut in Ek Duuje Ke Liye (1981).

== Death ==
Thapa died in Kathmandu on 7 February 2026, at the age of 68. He was found unconscious at his residence and rushed to Norvic Hospital, Thapathali, where doctors declared him dead. A post-mortem examination later confirmed that he had suffered a heart attack, which led to cardiac arrest.

His death was widely mourned across the Nepali film industry, where he was regarded as one of the most influential character actors, particularly known for redefining antagonist roles in Nepali cinema.

== Filmography ==
Year	Film	Role	Language	Notes
1981	Ek Duuje Ke Liye		Hindi	
1982	Aaj Ki Awaaz		Hindi	
1982	Mashaal		Nepali	
1986	Manav Hatya	Police Constable Bajirao Kale	Hindi	
1989	Chinoo	Rate Kaila	Nepali	
1989	Manu The Great		Hindi	
1989	Albela		Hindi	
1991	Deuki		Nepali	
1992	Naseebwaala		Hindi	
1992	Bandhu	Inspector	Hindi / Bengali	
1994	Prabhisha		Nepali	
1999	Thuldai		Nepali	
2000	Aago		Nepali	
2000	Tan Ta Sarai Bigris Ni Badri		Nepali	
2000	Yo Maya Ko Sagar	Pitambar	Nepali	
2003	Jetho Kancho	Birkhe Saau	Nepali	
2004	Basanta Ritu	Ranveer Singh	Nepali	
2005	Karma Yoodha	Dharanidhar	Nepali	
2006–2017	Meri Bassai	Sher Singh Mama	Nepali	TV series
2007	Raghubir	Birat	Nepali	
2008	Kanoon	Mantri Satya Prakash	Nepali	
2009	God Lives in the Himalayas		Nepali	
2014	Mary Kom	M. Narjit Singh	Hindi	
2015	10 Endrathukulla	Lawyer	Tamil	
2017	Sarkar Raj		Bhojpuri	
2018	Border		Bhojpuri	
2019	Nirahua Chalal London	Vishabhar Singh	Bhojpuri	
2019–20??	Dear Jindagi		Nepali	TV series
2019	Sher-E-Hindustan		Bhojpuri	
2022	Prem Geet 3		Nepali	
2025	Mirai		Telugu	

== Awards ==
SN	Award Title	Film Name / Project	Year	Result / Reference
1	Best Actor in a Negative Role (Nepal Motion Picture Award - NEMPA)	Chino	1998 (2055 BS)	Won
2	Special Award	—	2012	Won
3	Best Actor in a Supporting Role (Filmfare Awards)	Mary Kom	2015	Nominated
4	Lifetime Achievement Award	Outstanding Contribution to Cinema	2015	Won
5	Achievement Award (Global Nepali Film Award)	—	2016	Won
6	Special Award (Kamana Film Award)	Sherbahadur	2018 (2075 BS)	Won
