= Producers Guild Film Award for Best Film =

Annual Indian film award

- Awarded for: Best Film of the Year
- Country: India
- Presented by: Film & Television Producers Guild
- First award: 2004 (for films released around 2003)
- Currently held by: Bajrangi Bhaijaan (2015)
- Website: Star Guild Awards

The Producers Guild Film Award for Best Film (previously known as the Apsara Award for Best Film) is given by the producers of the film and television guild as part of its annual award ceremony to recognise the best film of the year. Following its inception in 2004, no one was awarded in 2005 and 2007.

== Winners ==
Year	Film	Producer/Production
2004	Koi Mil Gaya	Rakesh Roshan
2006	Black	Sanjay Leela Bhansali
2008	Chak De India!	Yash Raj Films
2009	Taare Zameen Par	Aamir Khan
2010	Ghajini	Geeta Arts
2011	Dabangg	Arbaaz Khan
2012	Zindagi Na Milegi Dobara	Excel Entertainment
2013	Barfi!	UTV Motion Pictures
2014	Bhaag Milkha Bhaag	Rakeysh Omprakash Mehra
2015	PK (tied with) Queen	Rajkumar Hirani (tied with) Phantom Films
2016	Bajrangi Bhaijaan	Kabir Khan Films Salman Khan Films

== See also ==
- Producers Guild Film Awards
- Producers Guild Film Award for Best Director
- Producers Guild Film Award for Best Actor in a Leading Role
- Producers Guild Film Award for Best Actress in a Leading Role
