= Omung Kumar =

Indian film director in Hindi cinema

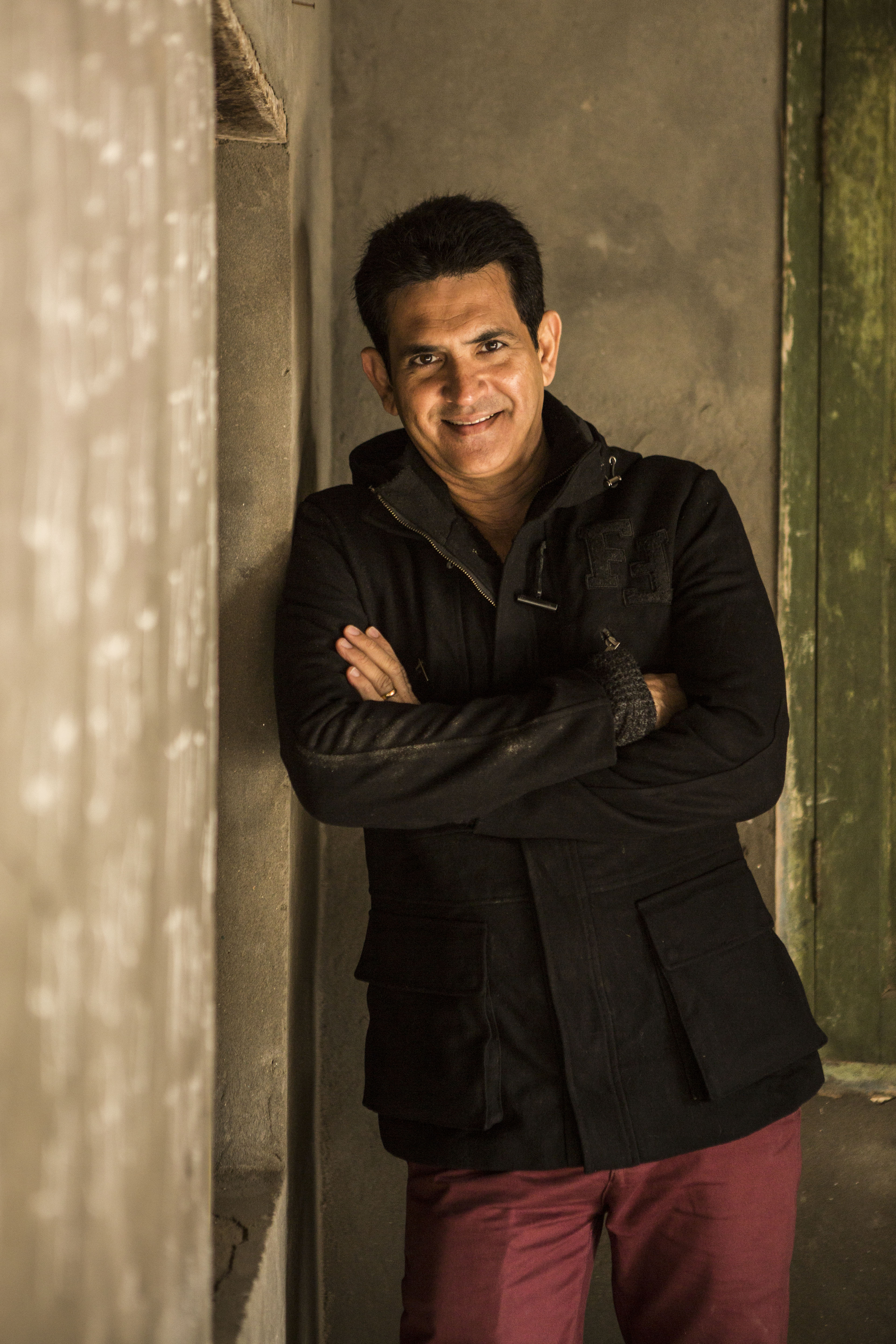
- Occupations: Film director; production designer; television host
- Spouse: Vanita Omung Kumar

Omung Kumar Bhandula is an Indian film director, film production designer, and television host known for his work in Hindi films. He worked as an art director for the films Black (2005), and Saawariya (2007), before making his directorial debut in 2014 with the biographical sports drama Mary Kom starring Priyanka Chopra. The film was a critical and commercial success. He and the film received several awards and nominations, including the National Film Award for Best Popular Film Providing Wholesome Entertainment. His second film, Sarbjit (2016) was a biopic on Indian prisoner Sarabjit Singh, played by Randeep Hooda.

== Career ==
Kumar hosted the game show Ek Minute which was broadcast on Zee TV. He then worked as a production designer for films, such as Black (2005) and Saawariya (2007). He made his directorial debut with the 2014 biographical sports drama Mary Kom based on the eponymous boxer. The film, starring Priyanka Chopra as Kom, was a critical and commercial success. Mary Kom grossed ₹940 million (US$9.8 million) at the box office against a budget of ₹150 million (US$1.6 million). He and the film received several awards and nominations, including the National Film Award for Best Popular Film Providing Wholesome Entertainment.

== Filmography ==
Year	Film	Art Director	Director	Notes
2002	Dil Hai Tumhaara	Yes		
2003	Chameli	Yes		
2003	Jhankaar Beats	Yes		
2003	Ishq Vishk	Yes		
2004	Masti	Yes		
2004	Fida	Yes		
2005	Shabd	Yes		
2005	Waqt: The Race Against Time	Yes		
2005	Black	Yes		
2005	Pyare Mohan	Yes		
2006	Pyaar Ke Side Effects	Yes		
2007	Saawariya	Yes		
2008	Yuvvraaj	Yes		
2014	Mary Kom		Yes	National Film Award for Best Popular Film; Nominated—Filmfare Award for Best Film
2016	Sarbjit		Yes	
2017	Bhoomi		Yes	
2019	PM Narendra Modi		Yes	
