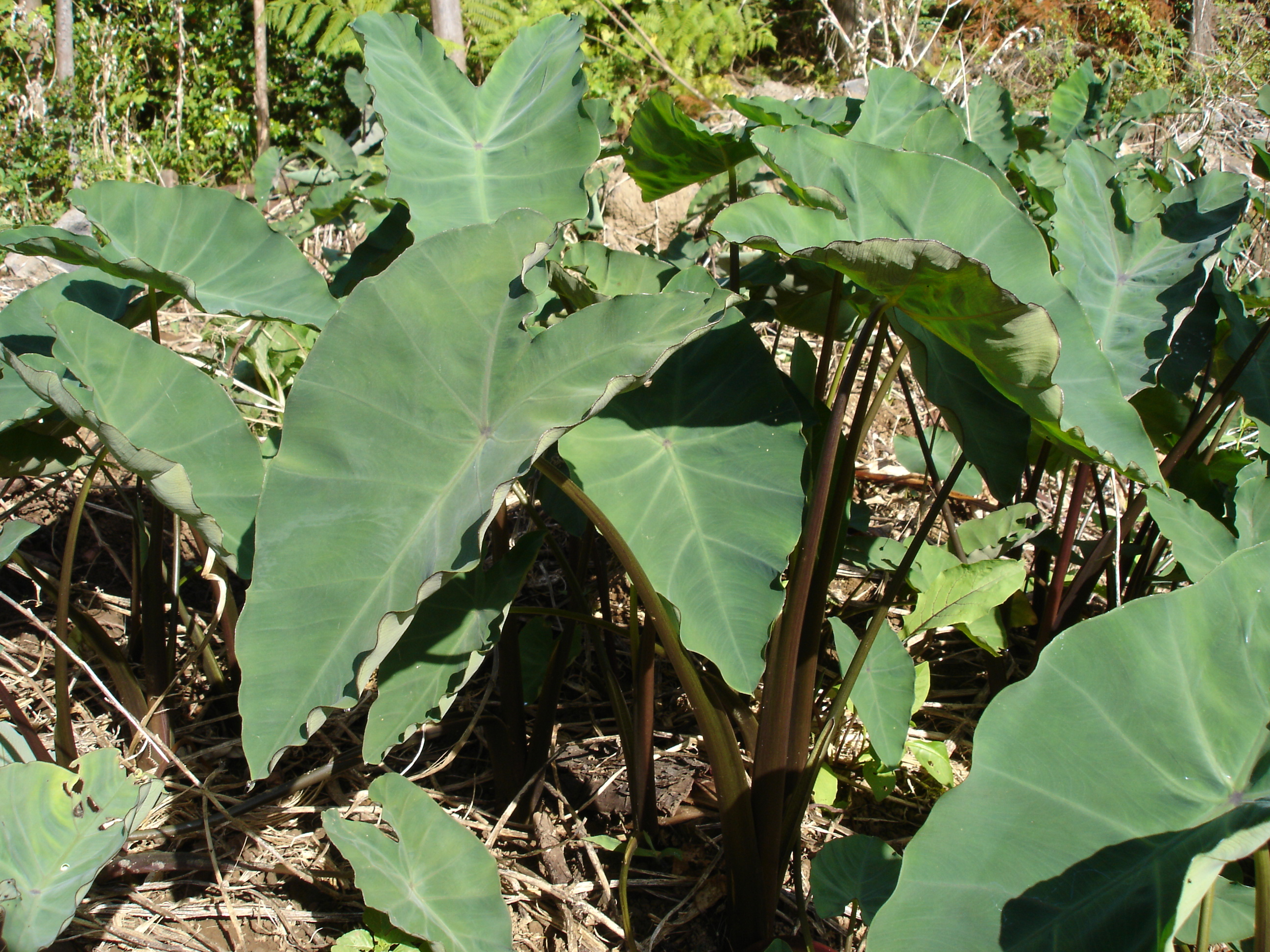

Scientific classification
- Kingdom: Plantae
- Clade: Tracheophytes
- Clade: Angiosperms
- Clade: Monocots
- Order: Alismatales
- Family: Araceae
- Genus: Colocasia
- Species: C. esculenta

Binomial name
- Colocasia esculenta (L.) Schott

Synonyms
- Alocasia dussii Dammer; Alocasia illustris W.Bull; Aron colocasium (L.) St.-Lag.; Arum chinense L.; Arum colocasia L.; Arum colocasioides Desf.; Arum esculentum L.; Arum lividum Salisb.; Arum nymphaeifolium (Vent.) Roxb.; Arum peltatum Lam.; Caladium acre R.Br.; Caladium colocasia (L.) W.Wight nom. illeg.; Caladium colocasioides (Desf.) Brongn.; Caladium esculentum (L.) Vent.; Caladium glycyrrhizum Fraser; Caladium nymphaeifolium Vent.; Caladium violaceum Desf.; Caladium violaceum Engl.; Calla gaby Blanco; Calla virosa Roxb.; Colocasia acris (R.Br.) Schott; Colocasia aegyptiaca Samp.; Colocasia colocasia (L.) Huth nom. inval.; Colocasia euchlora K.Koch & Linden; Colocasia fonstanesii Schott; Colocasia gracilis Engl.; Colocasia himalensis Royle; Colocasia neocaledonica Van Houtte; Colocasia nymphaeifolia (Vent.) Kunth; Colocasia peltata (Lam.) Samp.; Colocasia vera Hassk.; Colocasia violacea (Desf.) auct.; Colocasia virosa (Roxb.) Kunth; Colocasia vulgaris Raf.; Leucocasia esculenta (L.) Nakai; Steudnera virosa (Roxb.) Prain; Zantedeschia virosa (Roxb.) K.Koch

= Taro =

Species of plant

Taro (/ˈtɑːroʊ, ˈtær-/; Colocasia esculenta), also known as dasheen, is a root vegetable. It is the most widely cultivated species of several plants in the family Araceae that are used as vegetables for their corms, leaves, stems and petioles. Taro corms are a food staple in African, Caribbean, Oceanian, East Asian, Southeast Asian and South Asian cultures (similar to yams).

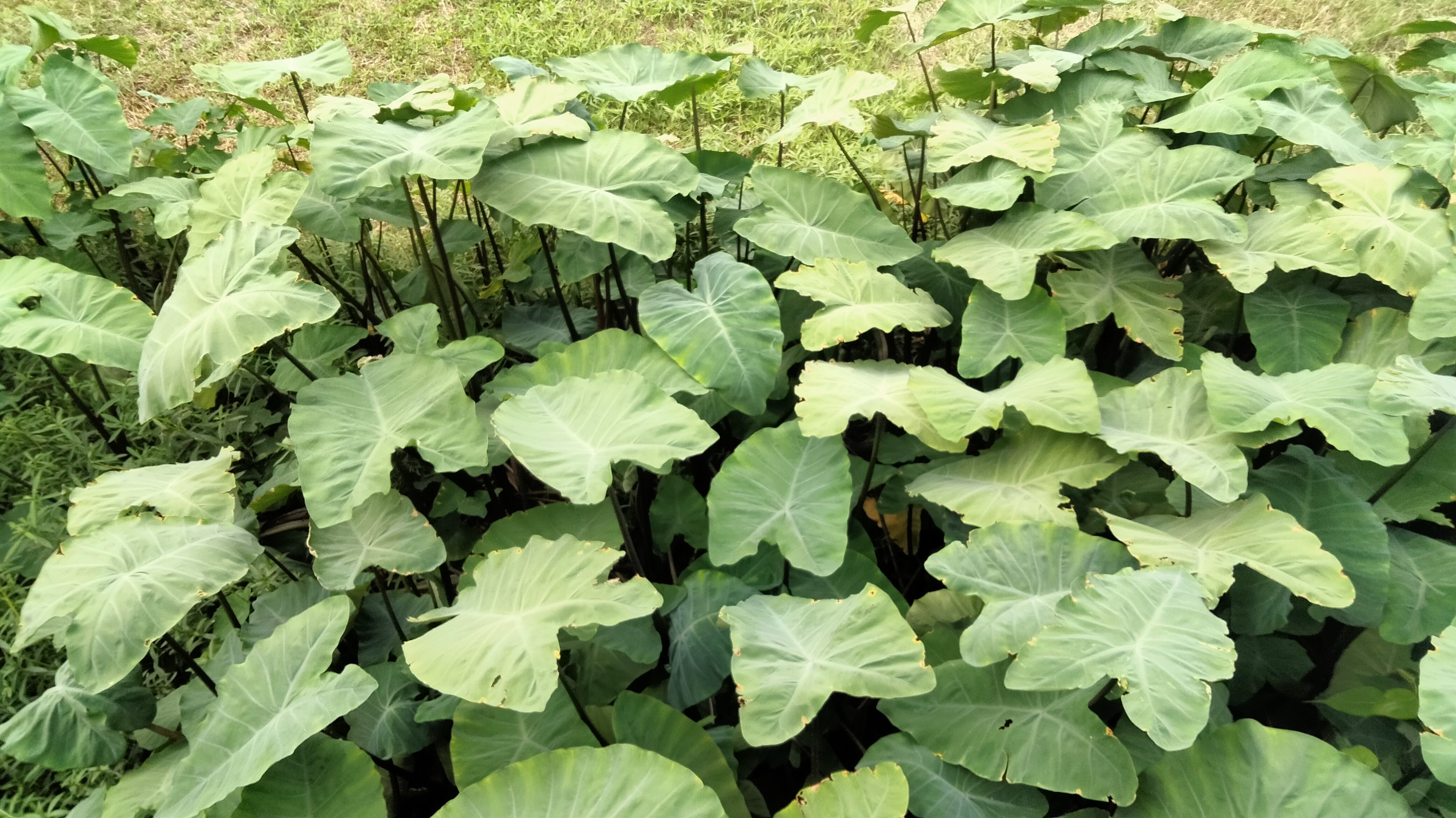
In the Mithila region of the Indian subcontinent, it is known as Kanch Gachh

== Description ==
Colocasia esculenta is a perennial, tropical plant primarily grown as a root vegetable for its edible, starchy corm. The plant has rhizomes of different shapes and sizes. Leaves are up to 40 by 25 centimetres (15 1/2 by 10 inches) and sprout from the rhizome. They are dark green above and light green beneath. They are triangular-ovate, sub-rounded and mucronate at the apex, with the tip of the basal lobes rounded or sub-rounded. The petiole is .8–1.2 metres (2 1/2–4 feet) high. The path can be up to 25 cm (10 in) long. The spadix is about three fifths as long as the spathe, with flowering parts up to 8 millimetres (3/8 in) in diameter. The female portion is at the fertile ovaries intermixed with sterile white ones. Neuters grow above the females, and are rhomboid or irregular orium lobed, with six or eight cells. The appendage is shorter than the male portion.

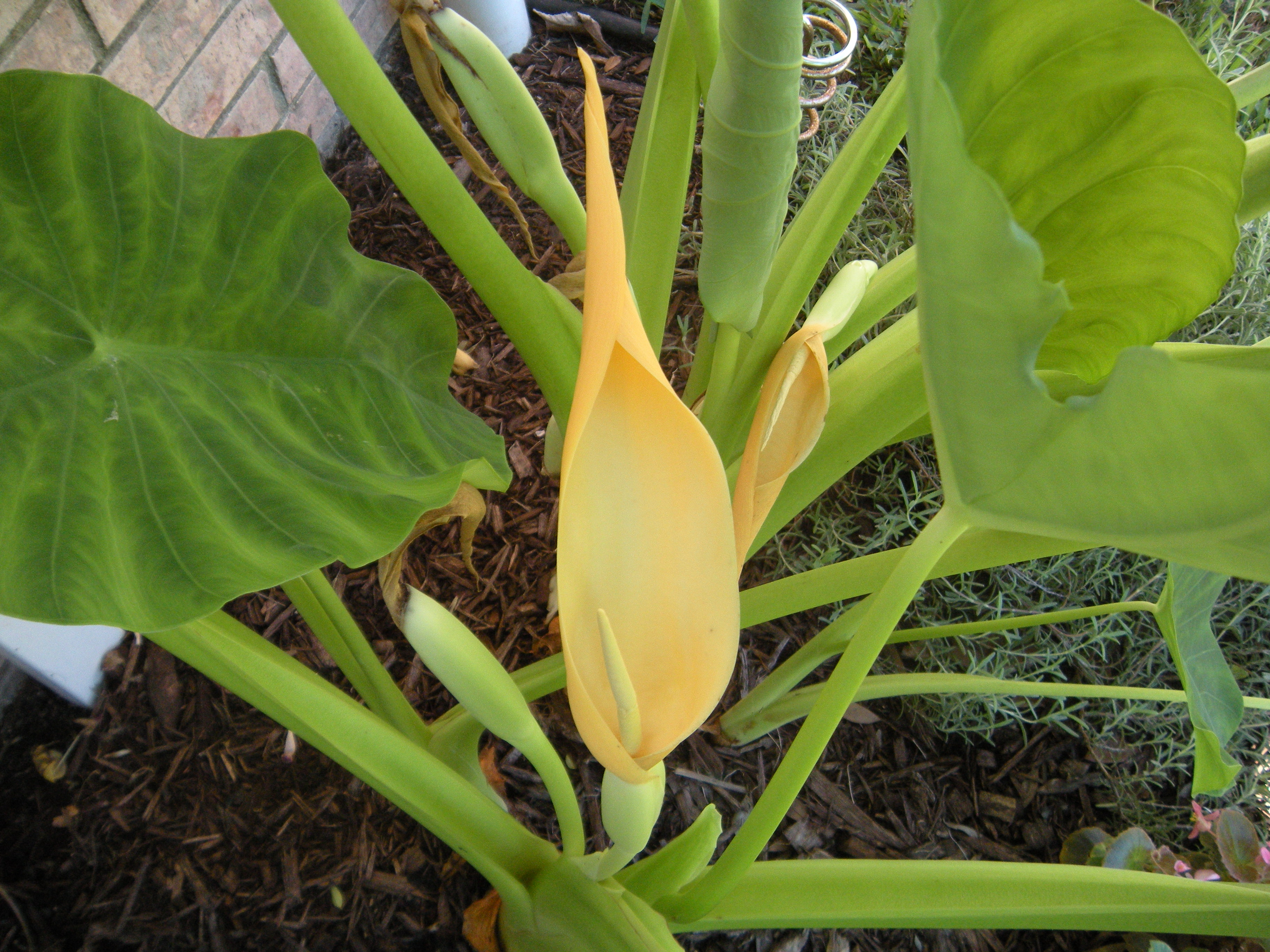
Flower

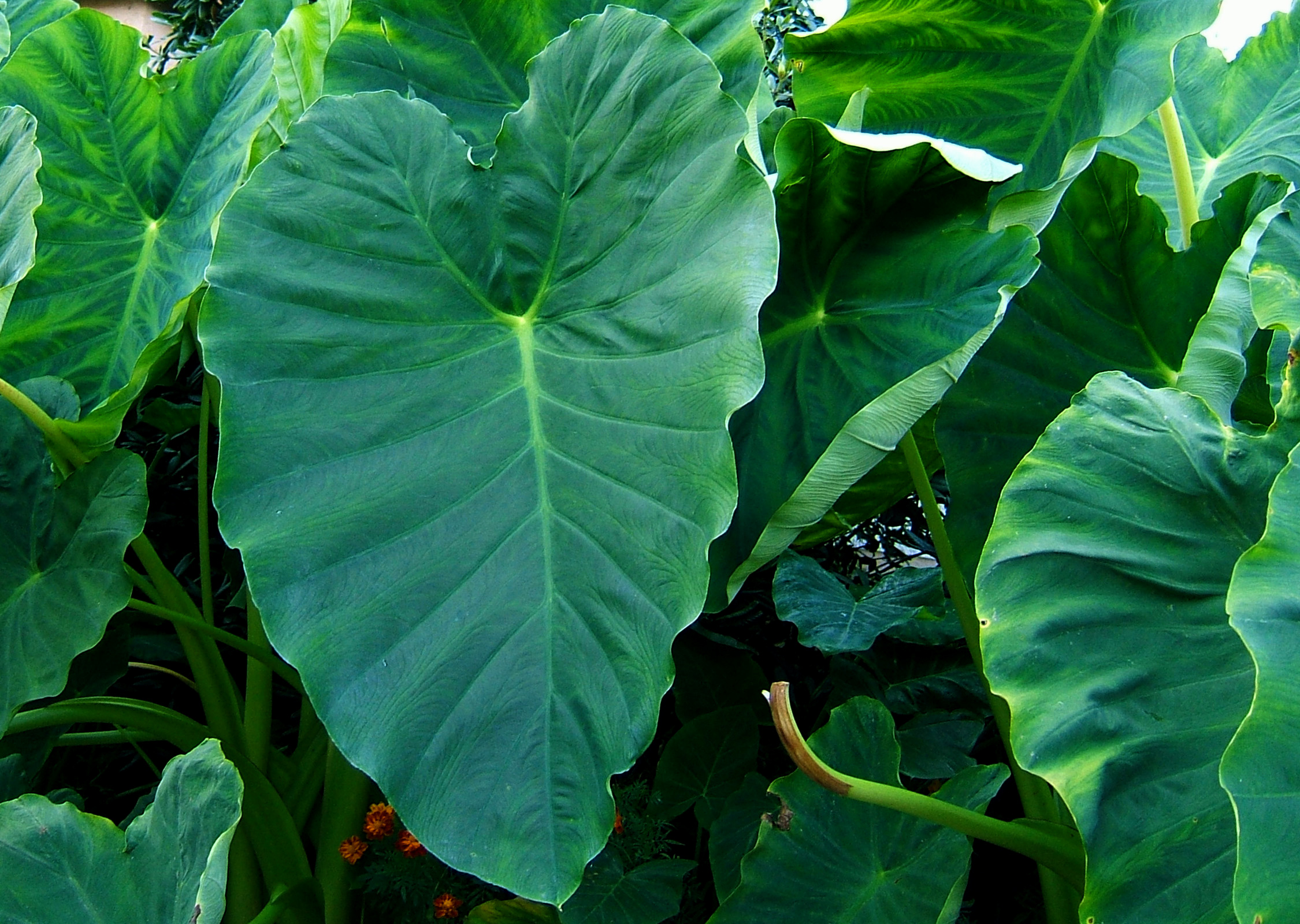
Leaves

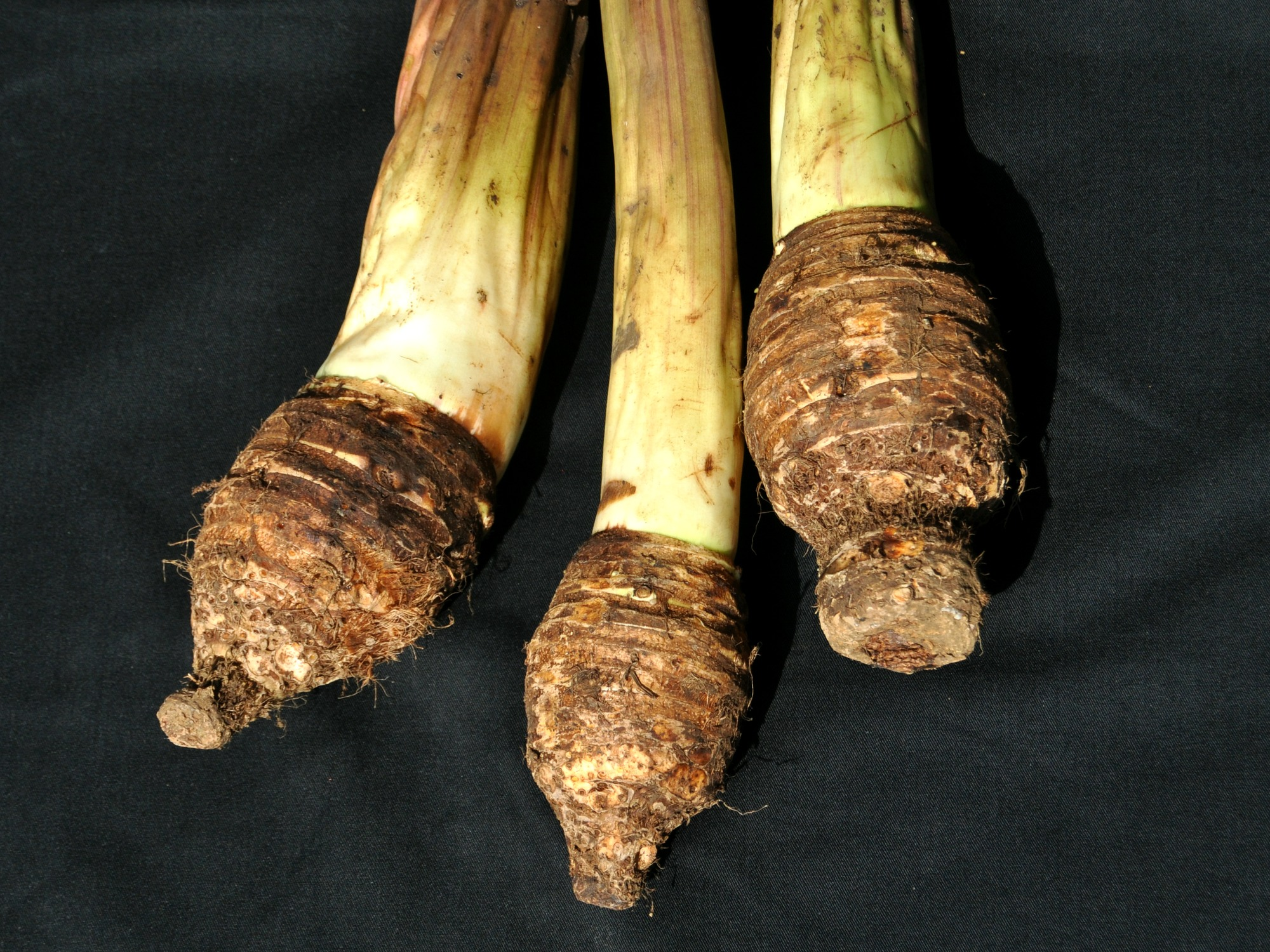
Corms

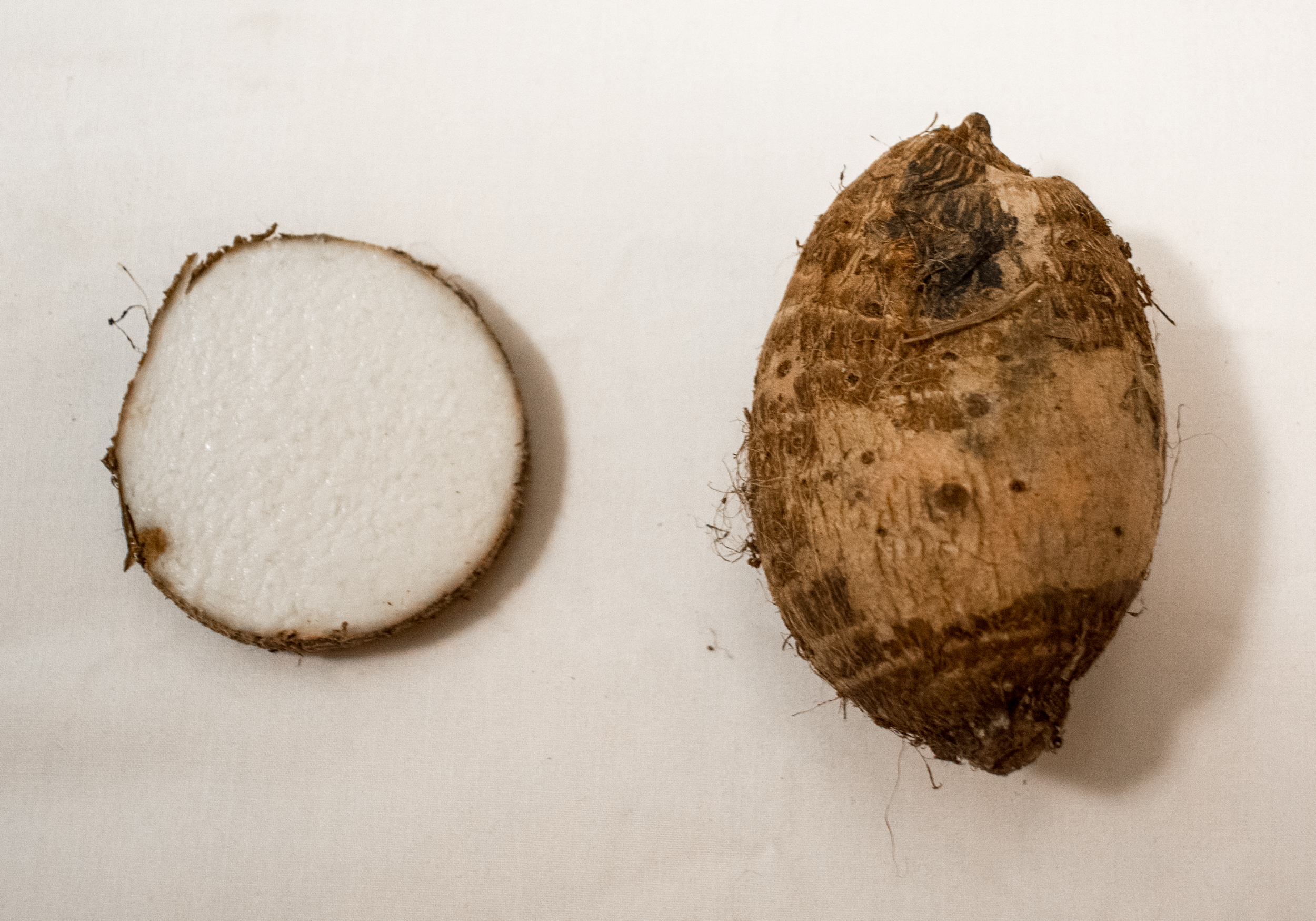
Corm (cross section)

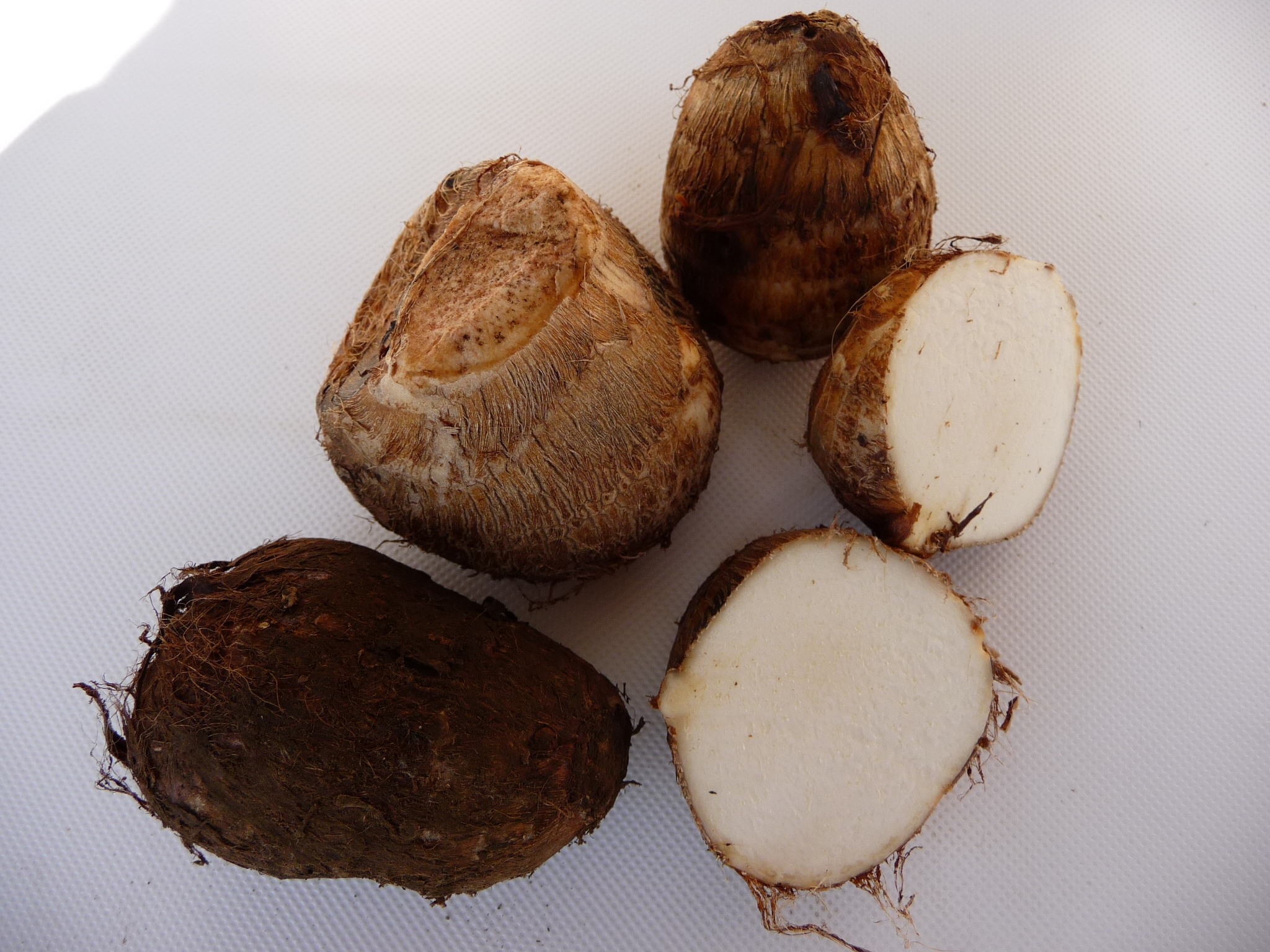
Corm with soil, may be sold (left bottom), washed (2 pcs) cross-section (2 pcs), Japan

=== Similar species ===
Taro is among the most widely grown species in the group of tropical perennial plants that are colloquially referred to as "elephant ears", when grown as ornamental plants. Other plants with the same nickname include certain species of related aroids possessing large, heart-shaped leaves, usually within such genera as Alocasia, Caladium, Monstera, Philodendron, Syngonium, Thaumatophyllum, and Xanthosoma.

Taro is related to Xanthosoma and Caladium, plants commonly grown ornamentally, and like them, it is sometimes loosely called elephant ear. Similar taro varieties include giant taro (Alocasia macrorrhizos), swamp taro (Cyrtosperma merkusii), and arrowleaf elephant's ear (Xanthosoma sagittifolium).

== Taxonomy ==
The 18th-century Swedish biologist Carl Linnaeus originally described two species, Colocasia esculenta and Colocasia antiquorum, but many later botanists consider them both to be members of a single, very variable species, the correct name for which is Colocasia esculenta.

=== Etymology ===
The Ancient Greek word κολοκάσιον (kolokasion, lit. 'lotus root') is the origin of the Modern Greek word kolokasi (κολοκάσι); the word for the plant is kolokas in Greek, gölevez in Turkish, and qulqas (قلقاس) in Arabic. These were borrowed by Latin as colocasia, thus becoming the genus name Colocasia. The specific epithet, esculenta, means "edible" in Latin.

The English name taro was borrowed from the Māori language when Captain Cook first observed Colocasia plantations in New Zealand in 1769. The form taro or talo is widespread among Polynesian languages: taro in Tahitian; talo in Samoan and Tongan; kalo in Hawaiian; taʻo in Marquesan. All these forms originate from Proto-Polynesian *talo, which itself descended from Proto-Oceanic *talos (cf. dalo in Fijian) and Proto-Austronesian *tales (cf. taleus in Sundanese & tales in Javanese). However, irregularity in sound correspondences among the cognate forms in Austronesian suggests that the term may have been borrowed and spread from an Austroasiatic language perhaps in Borneo (cf. proto-Mon-Khmer *t_{2}rawʔ, Khasi shriew, Khmu sroʔ, Mlabri kwaaj,...).

== Distribution and habitat ==
Colocasia esculenta is thought to be native to Southern India and Southeast Asia, but is widely naturalised. Colocasia is thought to have originated in the Indomalayan realm, perhaps in East India, Nepal, and Bangladesh. It spread by cultivation eastward into Southeast Asia, East Asia and the Pacific Islands; westward to Egypt and the eastern Mediterranean Basin; and then southward and westward from there into East Africa and West Africa, where it spread to the Caribbean and Americas.

Taro was probably first native to the lowland wetlands of Malaysia, where it is called talas. In modern times it is also called keladi Cina (literally Chinese yam).

In Australia, C. esculenta var. aquatilis is thought to be native to the Kimberley region of Western Australia; the common variety esculenta is now naturalised and considered an invasive weed in Western Australia, the Northern Territory, Queensland and New South Wales.

In Europe, C. esculenta is cultivated in Cyprus and it's called Colocasi, (Κολοκάσι in Greek) and it is certified as a PDO product. It is also found in the Greek island of Ikaria and cited as a vital source of food for the island during World War II.

In Turkey, C. esculenta is locally known as gölevez and mainly grown on the Mediterranean coast, such as the Alanya district of Antalya Province and the Anamur district of Mersin Province.

In Macaronesia this plant has become naturalized, probably as a result of the Portuguese discoveries and is frequently used in the Macaronesian diet as an important carbohydrate source.

In the southeastern United States, this plant is recognized as an invasive species. Many populations can be commonly found growing near drain ditches and bayous in Houston, Texas.

== Cultivation ==
=== History ===
Taro is one of the most ancient cultivated crops. Taro is found widely in tropical and subtropical regions of South Asia, East Asia, Southeast Asia, and Papua New Guinea, and northern Australia and in Maldives. Taro is highly polymorphic, making taxonomy and distinction between wild and cultivated types difficult. It is believed that they were domesticated independently multiple times, with authors giving possible locations as New Guinea, Mainland Southeast Asia, and northeastern India, based largely on the assumed native range of the wild plants. However, more recent studies have pointed out that wild taro may have a much larger native distribution than previously assumed, and wild breeding types may also likely be indigenous to other parts of Island Southeast Asia.

Archaeological traces of taro exploitation have been recovered from numerous sites, though whether these were cultivated or wild types can not be ascertained. They include the Niah Caves of Borneo around 10,000 years ago, Ille Cave of Palawan, dated to at least 11,000 year ago; Kuk Swamp of New Guinea, dated to between 8250 BC and 7960 BC; and Kilu Cave in the Solomon Islands dated to around 28,000 to 20,000 years ago. In the case of Kuk Swamp, there is evidence of formalized agriculture emerging by about 10,000 years ago, with evidence of cultivated plots, though which plant was cultivated remains unknown.

Taro were carried into the Pacific Islands by Austronesian peoples from around 1300 BC, where they became a staple crop of Polynesians, along with other types of "taros", like Alocasia macrorrhizos, Amorphophallus paeoniifolius, and Cyrtosperma merkusii. They are the most important and the most preferred among the four, because they were less likely to contain the irritating raphides present in the other plants. Taro is also identified as one of the staples of Micronesia, from archaeological evidence dating back to the pre-colonial Latte Period (c. 900 – 1521 AD), indicating that it was also carried by Micronesians when they colonized the islands. Taro pollen and starch residue have also been identified in Lapita sites, dated to between 1100 BC and 550 BC. Taro was later spread to Madagascar as early as the 1st century AD.

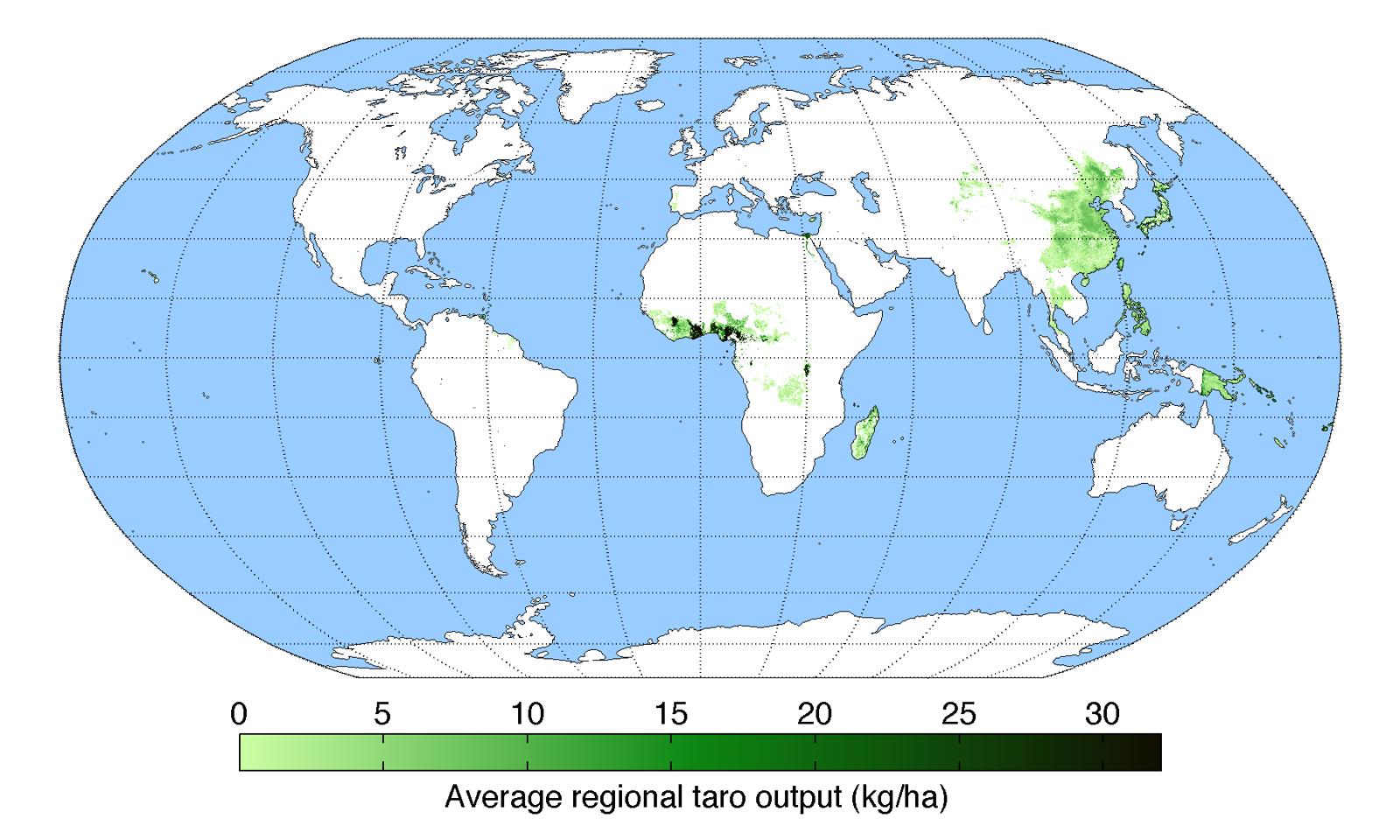
Geographic distribution of taro production

=== Modern production ===
In 2022, world production of taro was 18 million tonnes, led by Nigeria with 46% of the total (table).

Taro has the fifth largest production among root and tuber crops worldwide. The average yield of taro is around 7 tons per hectare.

Taro can be grown in paddy fields where water is abundant or in upland situations where water is supplied by rainfall or supplemental irrigation. Taro is one of the few crops (along with rice and lotus) that can be grown under flooded conditions. Flooded cultivation has some advantages over dry-land cultivation: higher yields (about double), out-of-season production (which may result in higher prices), and weed control (which flooding facilitates). Manmade floodplains particular to taro cultivation are commonly found throughout tropical Polynesian societies called repo.

Taro production – 2022
| Country | (Millions of tonnes) |
|---|---|
| Nigeria | 8.2 |
| China | 1.9 |
| Cameroon | 1.9 |
| Ghana | 1.7 |
| Ethiopia | 1.7 |
| World | 17.7 |
Source: FAOSTAT of the United Nations

Like most root crops, taro and eddoes do well in deep, moist or even swampy soils where the annual rainfall exceeds 2,500 mm (100 in). Eddoes are more resistant to drought and cold. The crop attains maturity within six to twelve months after planting in dry-land cultivation and after twelve to fifteen months in wetland cultivation. The crop is harvested when the plant height decreases and the leaves turn yellow.

=== Quality control ===
Taro generally commands a higher market price in comparison to other root crops, so the quality control measures throughout the production process are rather essential. The sizes found in most markets are 1–2 kg and 2–3 kg. The best size for packaging and for consumers is 1–2 kg. To guarantee the product meets the expected high standards upon reaching the consumer, there are some common grading standards for fresh corms:

- No excess soil, softness or decay
- No bruises or deep cuts
- Spherical to round shape
- No major abnormal deformities
- No roots
- Approximately 5 cm (under 2") of petiole left attached to the corm
- No double-tops

Due to the high moisture content of the corms, and the plant's natural love of humidity, mold and disease can easily develop, causing root rot or decay. To prolong their shelf lives, the corms are usually stored at cooler temperatures, ranging from 10 to 15 degrees Celsius and maintained at a relative humidity of 80% to 90%. For packaging, the corms are commonly placed in polypropylene bags or ventilated wooden crates to minimize condensation and 'sweating.' During export, a weight allowance of approximately 5% above the net weight is included to account for potential shrinkage during transit. For commercial shipping and export purposes, refrigeration is used; for instance, corms with 5 to 10 centimeters of petiole remaining are exported from Fiji to New Zealand in wooden boxes. They are then transported via refrigerated container, chilled to around 5° Celsius. The corms can be maintained for up to six weeks in good condition; most good-quality corms may even be replanted and grown by the consumer, thanks to the species' prolific nature and hardiness.

=== Propagation ===
In the early 1970s, one of the earliest taro breeding programs was initiated in the Solomon Islands to create cultivars that were resistant to taro leaf blight. After taro leaf blight was introduced to Samoa in 1993, another breeding program was initiated. In this program Asian varieties that were resistant to TLB were used. The breeding program helped restore the taro export industry in Samoa.

Corm yield and corm quality appear to be negatively correlated. In order to produce the uniform fresh healthy corms that the market desires, early maturing cultivars with a growth period of 5 to 7 months can be used.

==== Selection methods and programs ====
Cultivars grown in the Pacific regions produce good quality corms as a result of selecting for corm quality and yield. However, the genetic bases of these cultivars is very narrow. Asian cultivars have agriculturally undesirable traits (such as suckers and stolon), but appear to be more genetically diverse. There needs to be an international exchange of taro germplasm with reliable quarantine procedures.

There are thought to be 15,000 varieties of C. esculenta. Currently there are 6,000 accession from various institutes from across the world. The INEA (International Network for Edible Aroids) already has a core sample of 170 cultivars that have been distributed. These cultivars are maintained in vitro in a germplasm centre in Fiji, which is considered safer and cheaper than field conservation.

==== Polyploidy breeding ====
Taro exists as a diploid (2n=28) and a triploid (3n=42). Naturally occurring triploids in India were found to have significantly better yields. There have been attempts to artificially make triploids by crossing diploids with artificial tetraploids

Taro, cooked, without salt
Nutritional value per 100 g (3.5 oz)
- Energy: 594 kJ (142 kcal)
- Carbohydrates: 34.6 g
- Sugars: 0.49
- Dietary fiber: 5.1 g
- Fat: 0.11 g
- Protein: 0.52 g
Vitamins and minerals
| Vitamins | Quantity %DV^{†} |
| Thiamine (B1) | 9% 0.107 mg |
| Riboflavin (B2) | 2% 0.028 mg |
| Niacin (B3) | 3% 0.51 mg |
| Pantothenic acid (B5) | 7% 0.336 mg |
| Vitamin B6 | 19% 0.331 mg |
| Folate (B9) | 5% 19 μg |
| Vitamin C | 6% 5 mg |
| Vitamin E | 20% 2.93 mg |
| Minerals | Quantity %DV^{†} |
| Calcium | 1% 18 mg |
| Iron | 4% 0.72 mg |
| Magnesium | 7% 30 mg |
| Manganese | 20% 0.449 mg |
| Phosphorus | 6% 76 mg |
| Potassium | 16% 484 mg |
| Zinc | 2% 0.27 mg |
- Other constituents: Quantity
- Water: 64 g
- Link to USDA Database entry
- ^{†}Percentages estimated using US recommendations for adults, except for potassium, which is estimated based on expert recommendation from the National Academies.

Taro leaves, raw
Nutritional value per 100 g (3.5 oz)
- Energy: 177 kJ (42 kcal)
- Carbohydrates: 6.7 g
- Sugars: 3 g
- Dietary fiber: 3.7 g
- Fat: 0.74 g
- Protein: 5 g
Vitamins and minerals
| Vitamins | Quantity %DV^{†} |
| Vitamin A equiv. beta-Carotene lutein zeaxanthin | 27% 241 μg 27% 2895 μg 1932 μg |
| Thiamine (B1) | 17% 0.209 mg |
| Riboflavin (B2) | 35% 0.456 mg |
| Niacin (B3) | 9% 1.513 mg |
| Vitamin B6 | 9% 0.146 mg |
| Folate (B9) | 32% 126 μg |
| Vitamin C | 58% 52 mg |
| Vitamin E | 13% 2.02 mg |
| Vitamin K | 91% 108.6 μg |
| Minerals | Quantity %DV^{†} |
| Calcium | 8% 107 mg |
| Iron | 13% 2.25 mg |
| Magnesium | 11% 45 mg |
| Manganese | 31% 0.714 mg |
| Phosphorus | 5% 60 mg |
| Potassium | 22% 648 mg |
| Zinc | 4% 0.41 mg |
- Other constituents: Quantity
- Water: 86 g
- Link to USDA Database entry
- ^{†}Percentages estimated using US recommendations for adults, except for potassium, which is estimated based on expert recommendation from the National Academies.

== Nutrition ==
Cooked taro is 64% water, 35% carbohydrates, and contains negligible protein and fat (table). In a reference amount of 100 grams (3.5 oz), taro supplies 142 calories of food energy, and is a rich source (20% or more of the Daily Value, DV) of vitamin B6 (25% DV), vitamin E (20% DV), and manganese (21% DV), while phosphorus and potassium are in moderate amounts (10–11% DV).

Raw taro leaves are 86% water, 7% carbohydrates, 5% protein, and 1% fat. The leaves are nutrient-rich, containing substantial amounts of vitamins and minerals, especially vitamin K at 103% of the DV.

== Uses ==
=== Culinary ===
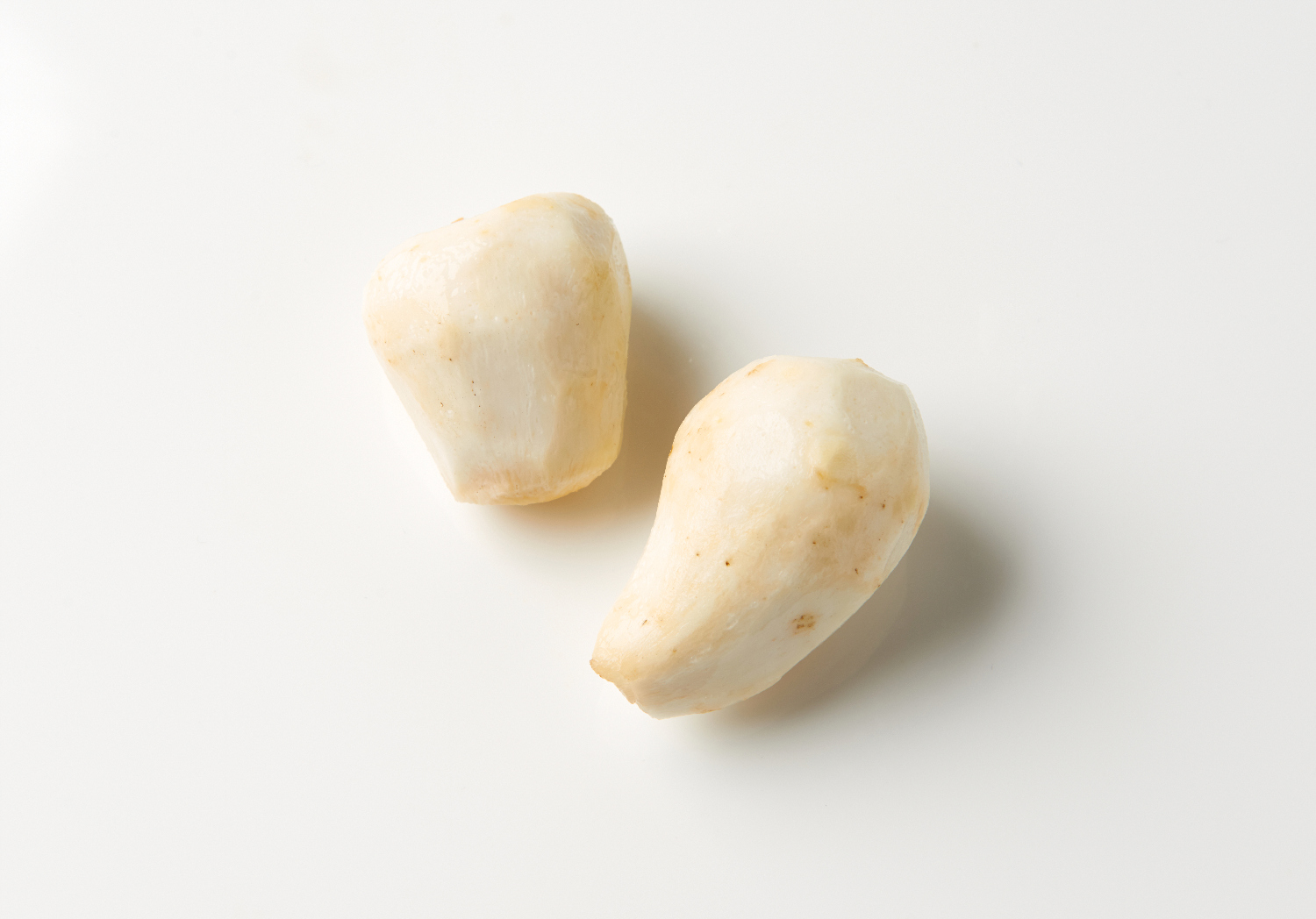
Peeled taro corms

Taro is a food staple in various African, Asian and Oceanic cultures. People usually consume its edible corm and leaves. The corms, which have a light purple color due to phenolic pigments, are roasted, baked or boiled. The natural sugars give a sweet, nutty flavor. The starch is easily digestible, and since the grains are fine and small it is often used for baby food.

In its raw form, the plant is toxic to pets and humans due to the presence of calcium oxalate and the presence of needle-shaped raphides in the plant cells. However, the toxin can be minimized and the tuber rendered palatable by cooking, or by steeping in cold water overnight.

Corms of the small, round variety are peeled and boiled, then sold either frozen, bagged in their own liquids, or canned.

==== Oceania ====
===== Cook Islands =====
Taro is the pre-eminent crop of the Cook Islands and surpasses all other crops in terms of land area devoted to production. The prominence of the crop there has led it to be a staple of the population's diet. Taro is grown across the country, but the method of cultivation depends on the nature of the island it is grown on. Taro also plays an important role in the country's export trade. The root is eaten boiled, as is standard across Polynesia. Taro leaves are also eaten, cooked with coconut milk, onion, and meat or fish.

===== Fiji =====
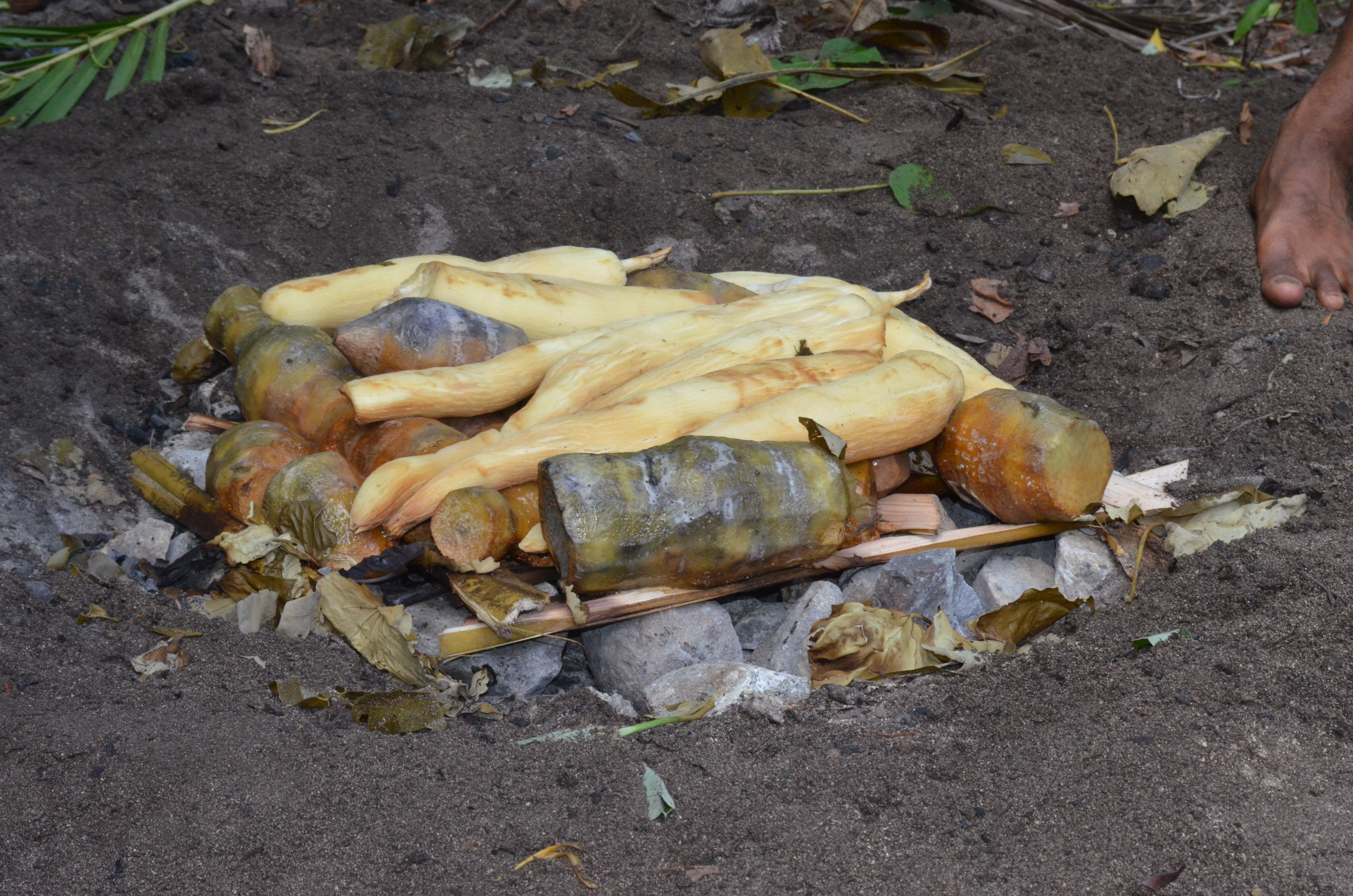
Fijian lovo of cooked staples: taro and cassava (white)

Taro (dalo in Fijian) has been a staple of the Fijian diet for centuries, and its cultural importance is celebrated on Taro Day. Its growth as an export crop began in 1993 when taro leaf blight devastated the taro industry in neighboring Samoa. Fiji filled the void and was soon supplying taro internationally. Almost 80% of Fiji's exported taro comes from the island of Taveuni where the taro beetle species Papuana uninodis is absent. The Fijian taro industry on the main islands of Viti Levu and Vanua Levu faces constant damage from the beetles. The Fiji Ministry of Agriculture and the Land Resources Division of the Secretariat of the Pacific Community (SPC) are researching pest control and instigating quarantine restrictions to prevent the spread of the pest. Taveuni now exports pest-damage-free crops.

===== Hawaii =====
Kalo is taro's Hawaiian name. The local crop plays an important role in Hawaiian culture and Indigenous religion. Taro is a traditional staple of the native cuisine of Hawaii. Some of the uses for taro include poi, table taro (steamed and served like a potato), taro chips, and lūʻau leaf (to make laulau). In Hawaii, kalo is farmed under either dryland or wetland conditions. Taro farming there is challenging because of the difficulties of accessing fresh water. Kalo is usually grown in "pond fields" known as loʻi. Typical dryland or "upland" varieties (varieties grown in watered but not flooded fields) are lehua maoli and bun long, the latter widely known as "Chinese taro". Bun long is used for making taro chips. Dasheen (also called "eddo") is another dryland variety cultivated for its corms or as an ornamental plant. A contemporary Hawaiian diet consists of many tuberous plants, particularly sweet potato and kalo.

The Hawaii Agricultural Statistics Service determined the 10-year median production of kalo to be about 6.1 million pounds (2,800 t). However, 2003 taro production was only 5 million pounds (2,300 t), the lowest since record-keeping began in 1946. The previous low (1997) was 5.5 million pounds (2,500 t). Despite generally growing demand, production was even lower in 2005—only 4 million pounds, with kalo for processing into poi accounting for 97.5%. Urbanization is one cause driving down harvests from the 1948 high of 14.1 million pounds (6,400 t), but more recently, the decline has resulted from pests and diseases. A non-native apple snail (Pomacea canaliculata) is a major culprit along with a plant rot disease traced to a species of fungus in the genus Phytophthora that now damages kalo crops throughout Hawaii. Although pesticides could control both problems to some extent, pesticide use in the loʻi is banned because of the opportunity for chemicals to migrate quickly into streams, and then eventually the sea.

====== Social roles ======
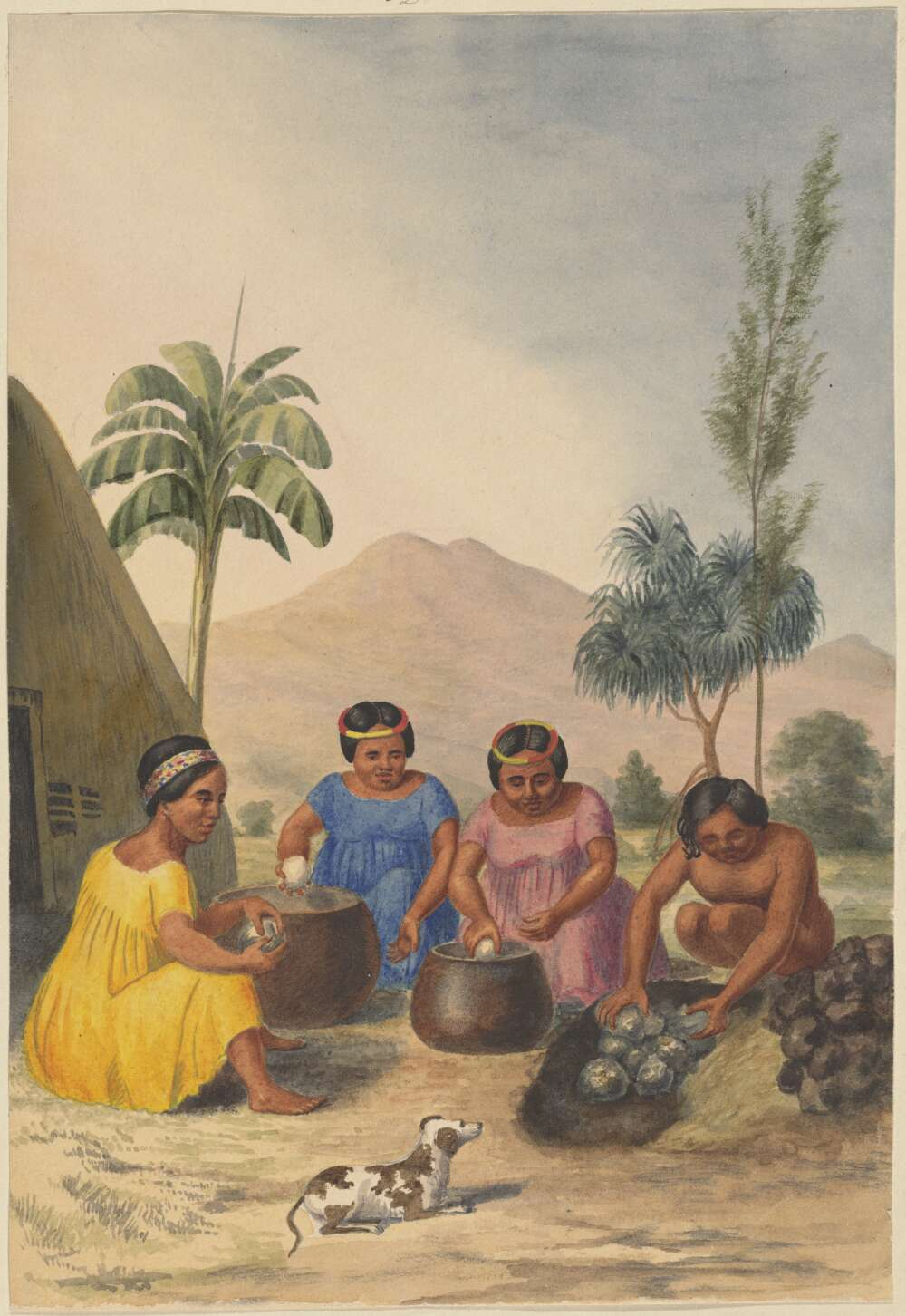
Cleaning the kalo, Sandwich Islands, 1852, watercolour by James Gay Sawkins

Important aspects of Hawaiian culture revolve around kalo. For example, the newer name for a traditional Hawaiian feast, the lūʻau, comes from kalo. Young kalo tops baked with coconut milk and chicken meat or octopus arms are frequently served at luaus.

By ancient Hawaiian custom, fighting is not allowed when a bowl of poi is "open". It is also disrespectful to fight in front of an elder and one should not raise their voice, speak angrily, or make rude comments or gestures.

====== Loʻi ======
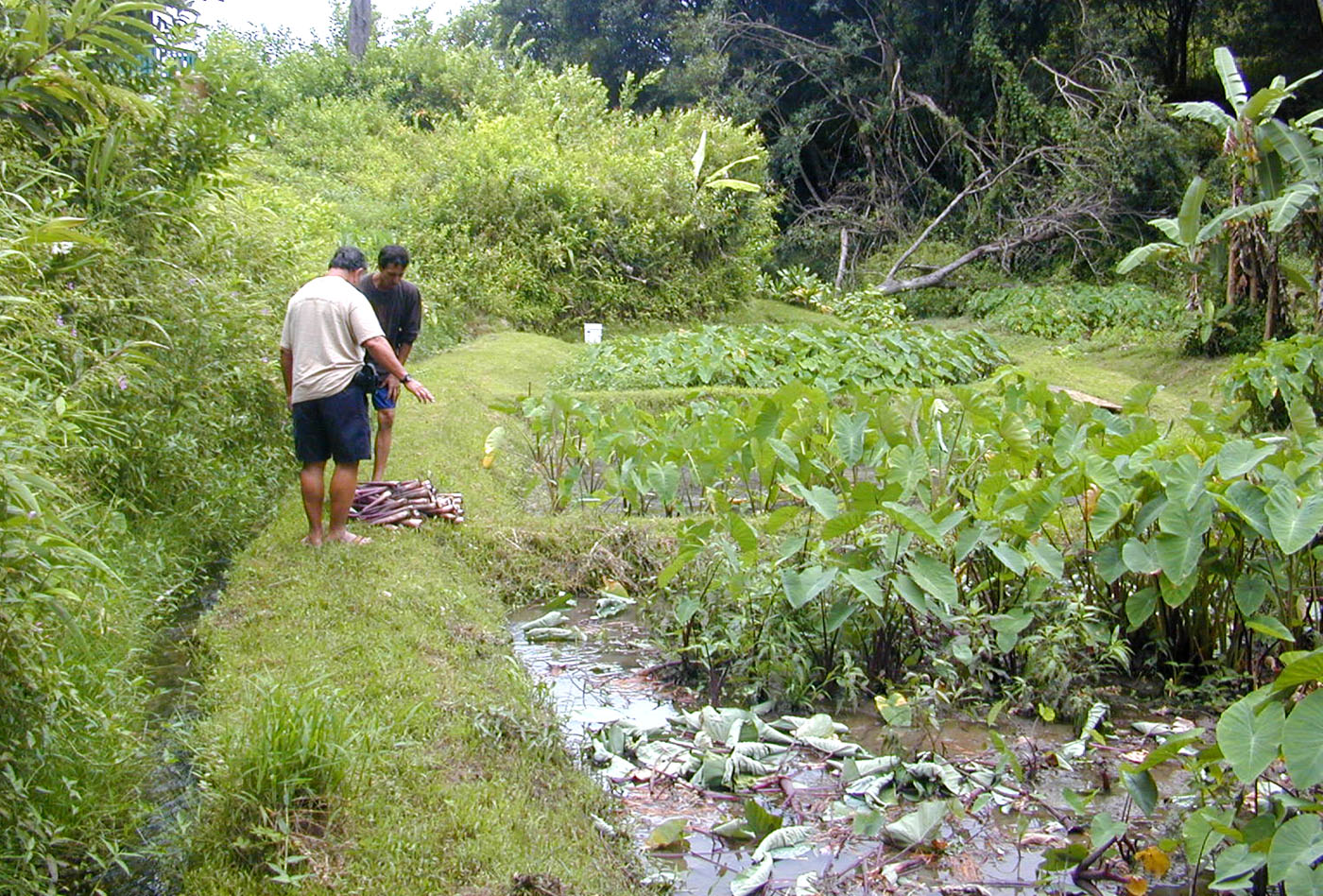
Several small loʻi (pondfields) in which kalo (taro) is being grown in the Maunawili Valley on Oʻahu, Hawaiʻi. The ditch on the left in the picture is called an ʻauwai and supplies diverted stream water to the loʻi.

A loʻi is a patch of wetland dedicated to growing kalo. Hawaiians have traditionally used irrigation to produce kalo. Wetland fields often produce more kalo per acre than dry fields. Wetland-grown kalo need a constant flow of water.

About 300 varieties of kalo were originally brought to Hawaiʻi (about 100 remain). The kalo plant takes seven months to grow until harvest, so lo`i fields are used in rotation and the soil can be replenished while the loʻi in use has sufficient water. Stems are typically replanted in the lo`i for future harvests.

====== History ======
One mythological version of Hawaiian ancestry cites the taro plant as an ancestor to Hawaiians. Legend joins two siblings of high and divine rank: Papahānaumoku ("Papa from whom lands are born", or Earth mother) and Wākea (Sky father). Together they create the islands of Hawaii and a beautiful woman, Hoʻohokukalani (The Heavenly one who made the stars).

The story of kalo begins when Wakea and Papa conceived their daughter, Hoʻohokukalani. Daughter and father then conceived a child together named Hāloanakalaukapalili (Long stalk trembling), but it was stillborn. After the father and daughter buried the child near their house, a kalo plant grew over the grave:

The stems were slender and when the wind blew they swayed and bent as though paying homage, their heart-shaped leaves shivering gracefully as in hula. And in the center of each leaf water gathered, like a mother's teardrop.

The second child born of Wākea and Hoʻohokukalani was named Hāloa after his older brother. The kalo of the earth was the sustenance for the young brother and became the principal food for successive generations. The Hawaiian word for family, ʻohana, is derived from ʻohā, the shoot that grows from the kalo corm. As young shoots grow from the corm of the kalo plant, so people, too, grow from their family.

===== Niue =====
The taro is one of the staple crops in Niue, and is also exported to New Zealand, including a pink variety.

===== Papua New Guinea =====
The taro corm is a traditional staple crop for large parts of Papua New Guinea, with a domestic trade extending its consumption to areas where it is not traditionally grown. Taro from some regions has developed particularly good reputations with (for instance) Lae taro being highly prized.

Among the Urapmin people of Papua New Guinea, taro (known in Urap as ima) is the main source of sustenance along with the sweet potato (Urap: wan). In fact, the word for "food" in Urap is a compound of these two words.

===== Polynesia =====
Considered the staple starch of traditional Polynesian cuisine, taro is both a common and prestigious food item that was first introduced to the Polynesian islands by prehistoric seafarers of Southeast Asian derivation. The tuber itself is prepared in various ways, including baking, steaming in earth ovens (umu or imu), boiling, and frying. The famous Hawaiian staple poi is made by mashing steamed taro roots with water. Taro also features in traditional desserts such as Samoan fa'ausi, which consists of grated, cooked taro mixed with coconut milk and brown sugar. The leaves of the taro plant also feature prominently in Polynesian cooking, especially as edible wrappings for dishes such as Hawaiian laulau, Fijian and Samoan palusami (wrapped around onions and coconut milk), and Tongan lupulu (wrapped corned beef). Ceremonial presentations on occasion of chiefly rites or communal events (weddings, funerals, etc.) traditionally included the ritual presentation of raw and cooked taro roots/plants.

The Hawaiian laulau traditionally contains pork, fish, and lu'au (cooked taro leaf). The wrapping is inedible ti leaves (Hawaiian: lau ki). Cooked taro leaf has the consistency of cooked spinach and is therefore unsuitable for use as a wrapping.

===== Samoa =====
In Samoa, the baby talo leaves and coconut milk are wrapped into parcels and cooked, along with other food, in an earth oven . The parcels are called palusami or lu'au. The resulting taste is smoky, sweet, savory and has a unique creamy texture. The root is also baked (talo tao) in the umu or boiled with coconut cream (faálifu talo). It has a slightly bland and starchy flavor. It is sometimes called the Polynesian potato.

===== Tonga =====
Lū is the Tongan word for the edible leaves of the taro plant (called talo in Tonga), as well as the traditional dish made using them. This meal is still prepared for special occasions and especially on Sunday. The dish consists of chopped meat, onions, and coconut milk wrapped in a number of taro leaves (lū talo). This is then wrapped traditionally in a banana leaf (nowadays, aluminum foil is often used) and put in the ʻumu to cook. It has a number of named varieties, dependent on the filling:

- Lū pulu – lū with beef, commonly using imported corned beef (kapapulu)
- Lū sipi – lū with lamb
- Lū moa – lū with chicken
- Lū hoosi – lū with horse meat

===== Oceanian atolls =====
The islands situated along the border of the three main parts of Oceania (Polynesia, Micronesia and Melanesia) are more prone to being atolls rather than volcanic islands (most prominently Tuvalu, Tokelau, and Kiribati). As a result of this, taro was not a part of the traditional diet due to the infertile soil and has only become a staple today through importation from other islands (taro and cassava cultivars are usually imported from Fiji or Samoa). The traditional staple, however, is the swamp taro known as pulaka or babai, a distant relative of the taro but with a very long growing phase (3–5 years), larger and denser corms and coarser leaves. It is grown in a patch of land dug out to give rise to the freshwater lense beneath the soil. The lengthy growing time of this crop usually confines it as a food during festivities, much like pork, although it can be preserved by drying out in the sun and storing it somewhere cool and dry to be enjoyed out of harvesting season.

==== East Asia ====
===== China =====
Taro (simplified Chinese: 芋头; traditional Chinese: 芋頭; pinyin: yùtou; Cantonese Yale: wuhtáu) is commonly used as a main course as steamed taro with or without sugar, as a substitute for other cereals, in Chinese cuisine in a variety of styles and provinces steamed, boiled or stir-fried as a main dish and as a flavor-enhancing ingredient. In Northern China, it is often boiled or steamed then peeled and eaten with or without sugar much like a potato. It is commonly braised with pork or beef. It is used in the Cantonese dim sum to make a small plated dish called taro dumpling as well as a pan-fried dish called taro cake. It can also be shredded into long strips which are woven together to form a seafood birdsnest. In Fujian cuisine, it is steamed or boiled and mixed with starch to form a dough for dumplings.

Taro cake is traditionally eaten during Chinese New Year celebrations. As a dessert, it can be mashed into a purée or used as a flavoring in tong sui, ice cream, and other desserts such as sweet taro pie. McDonald's sells taro-flavored pies in China.

Taro is mashed in the dessert known as taro purée.

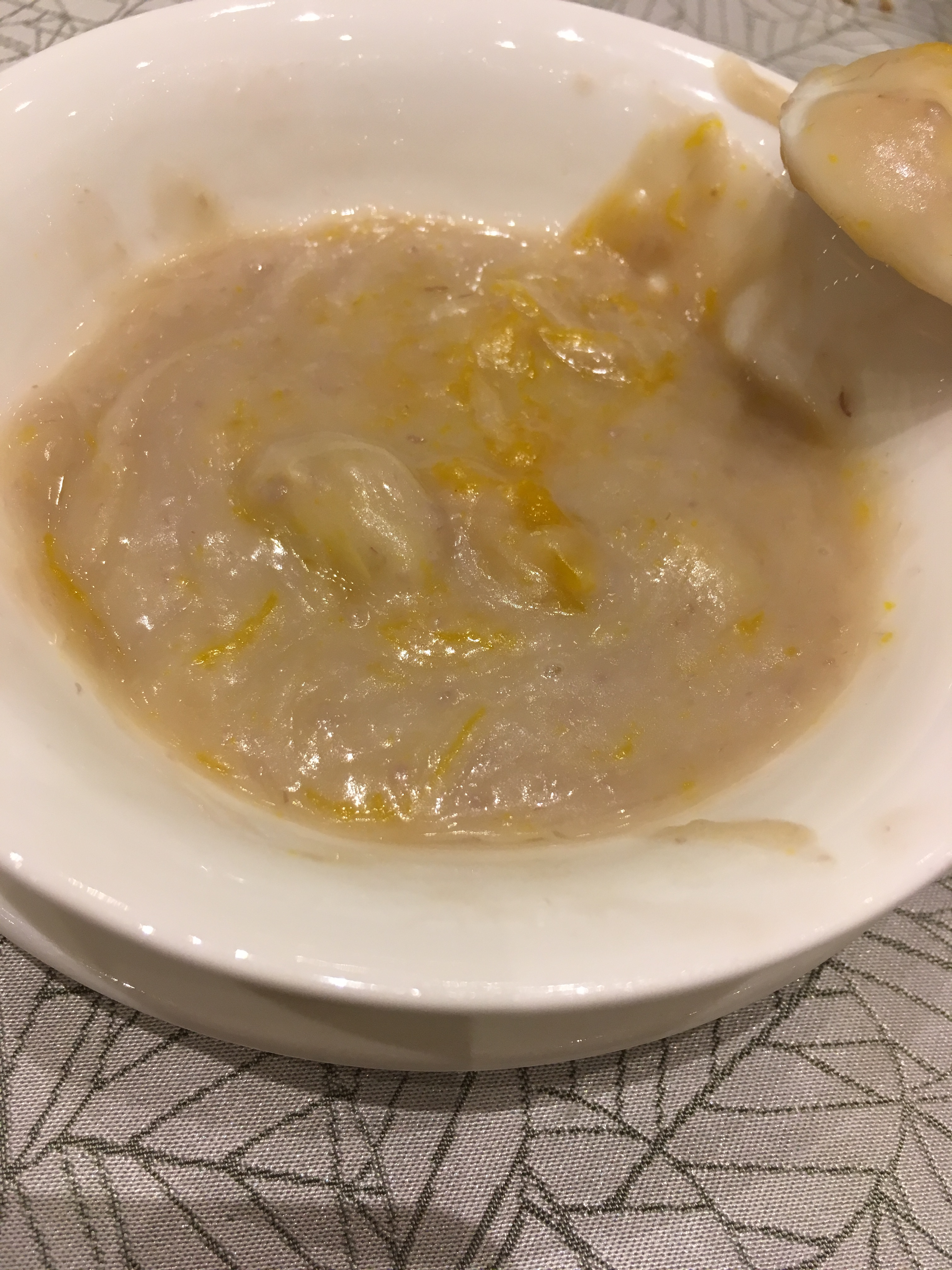
Taro paste, also known as "or nee", is a traditional Chaoshan dessert from China

Taro paste, a traditional Cantonese cuisine, which originated from the Chaoshan region in the eastern part of China's Guangdong Province is a dessert made primarily from taro. The taro is steamed and then mashed into a thick paste, which forms the base of the dessert. Lard or fried onion oil is then added for fragrance. The dessert is traditionally sweetened with water chestnut syrup, and served with ginkgo nuts. Modern versions of the dessert include the addition of coconut cream and sweet corn. The dessert is commonly served at traditional Teochew wedding banquet dinners as the last course, marking the end of the banquet.

===== Japan =====
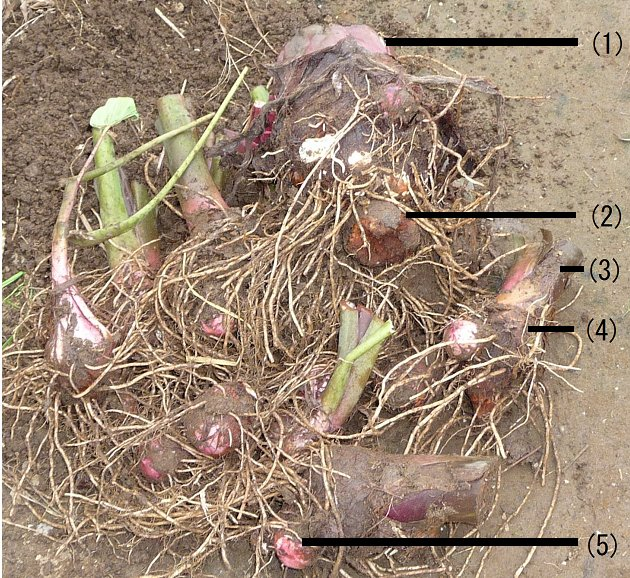
Excavated Japanese satoimo root (stems are cut before the plant is dug up): (1) Remaining stem from parent or seed satoimo, (2) Parent or seed satoimo, (3) Remaining stem from child satoimo, (4) Child satoimo, (5) Grandchild satoimo

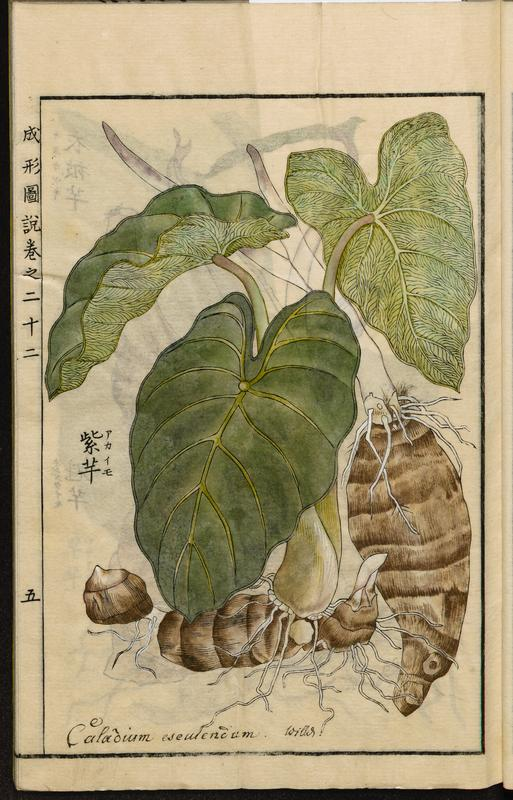
Colocasia esculenta from the Japanese agricultural encyclopedia Seikei Zusetsu

A similar plant in Japan is called satoimo (里芋、サトイモ; literally "village potato"). The "child" and "grandchild" corms (cormels, cormlets) which bud from the parent satoimo, are called koimo (子芋) and magoimo (孫芋), respectively, or more generally imonoko (芋の子). Satoimo has been propagated in Southeast Asia since the late Jōmon period. It was a regional staple before rice became predominant. The tuber, satoimo, is often prepared through simmering in fish stock (dashi) and soy sauce. The stalk, zuiki, can also be prepared a number of ways, depending on the variety.

===== Korea =====
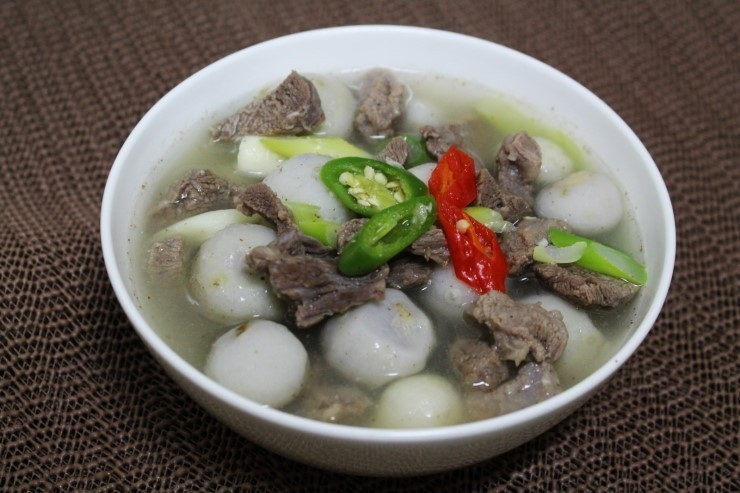
Toran-guk (taro soup)

In Korea, taro is called toran (Korean: 토란: "earth egg"), and the corm is stewed and the leaf stem is stir-fried. Taro roots can be used for medicinal purposes, particularly for treating insect bites. It is made into the Korean traditional soup toranguk (토란국). Taro stems are often used as an ingredient in yukgaejang (육개장).

===== Taiwan =====
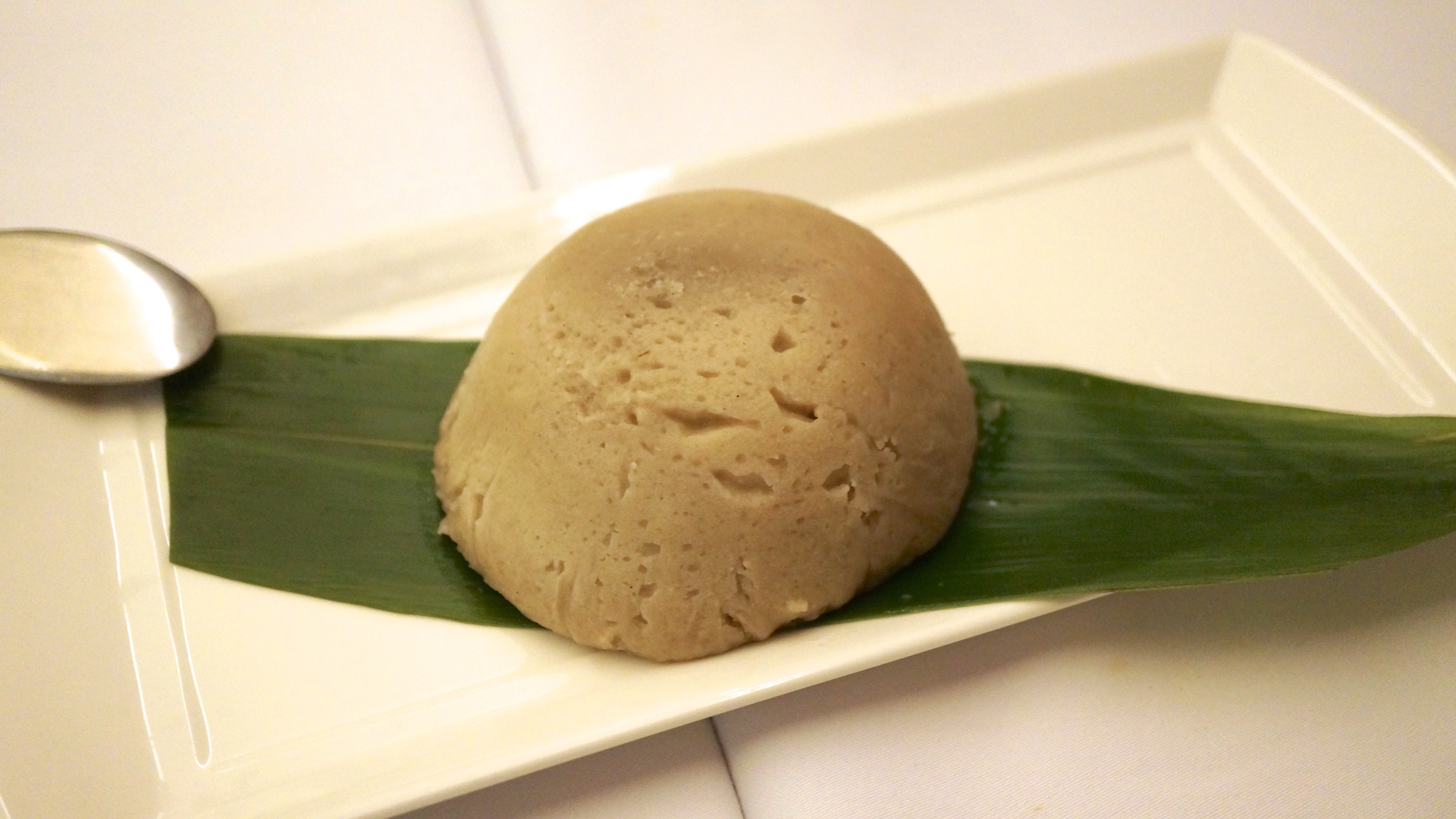
Small ball of mashed taro paste served on a banana leaf in a restaurant of the Daan district (Taipei)

In Taiwan, taro—yùtóu (芋頭) in Mandarin, and ō͘-á (芋仔) in Taiwanese—is well-adapted to Taiwanese climate and can grow almost anywhere in the country with minimal maintenance. Before the Taiwan Miracle made rice affordable to everyone, taro was one of the main staples in Taiwan. Nowadays taro is used more often in desserts. Supermarket varieties range from about the size and shape of a brussels sprout to longer, larger varieties the size of a football. Taro chips are often used as a potato-chip-like snack. Compared to potato chips, taro chips are harder and have a nuttier flavor. Another popular traditional Taiwanese snack is taro ball, served on ice or deep-fried. It is common to see taro as a flavor in desserts and drinks, such as bubble tea. The Taiwan Technical Mission launched a Taro ice cream making workshop for Micronesians in Nekken, Aimeliik.

==== Southeast Asia ====
===== Indonesia =====
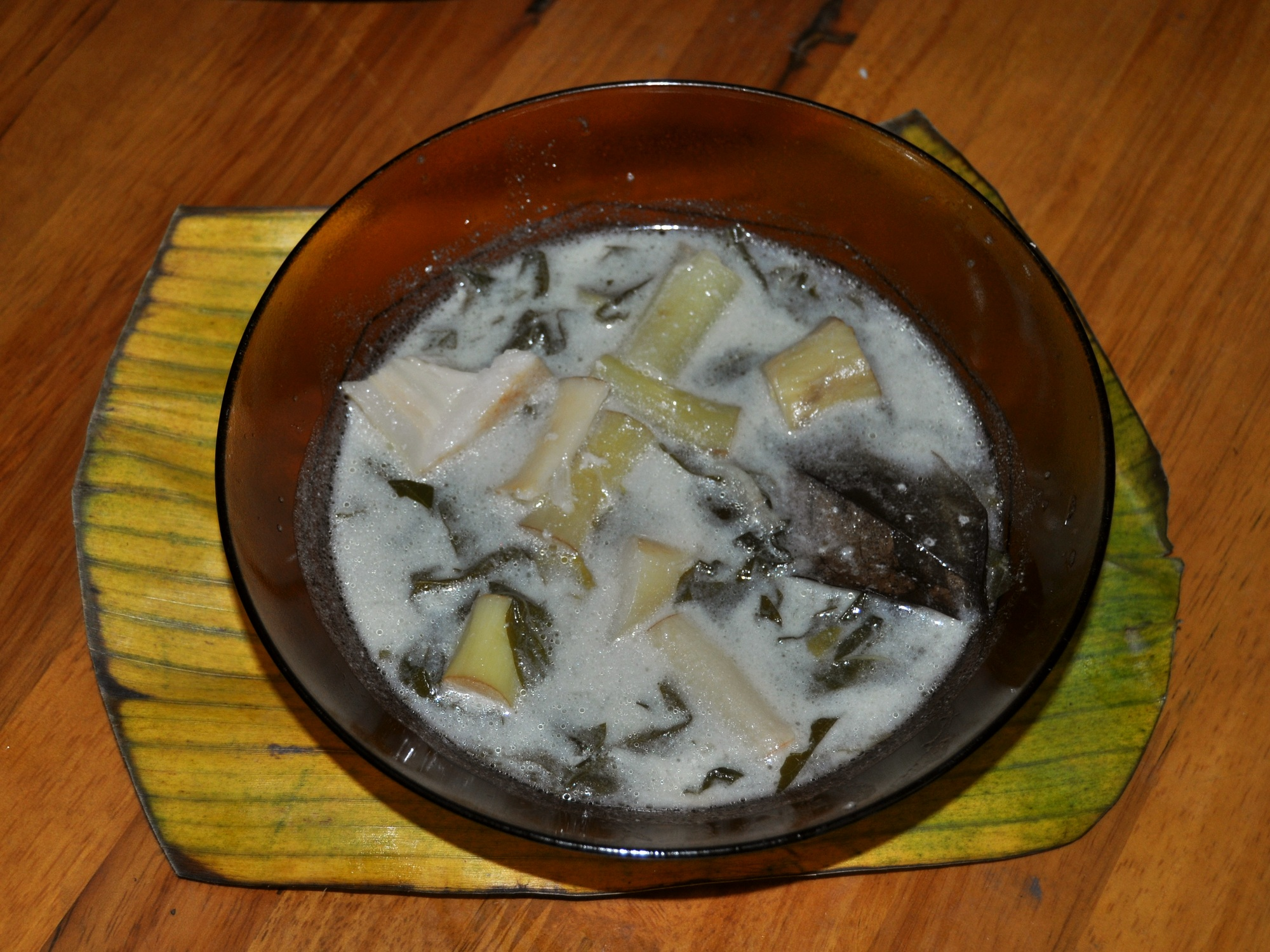
Sayur lodeh lompong

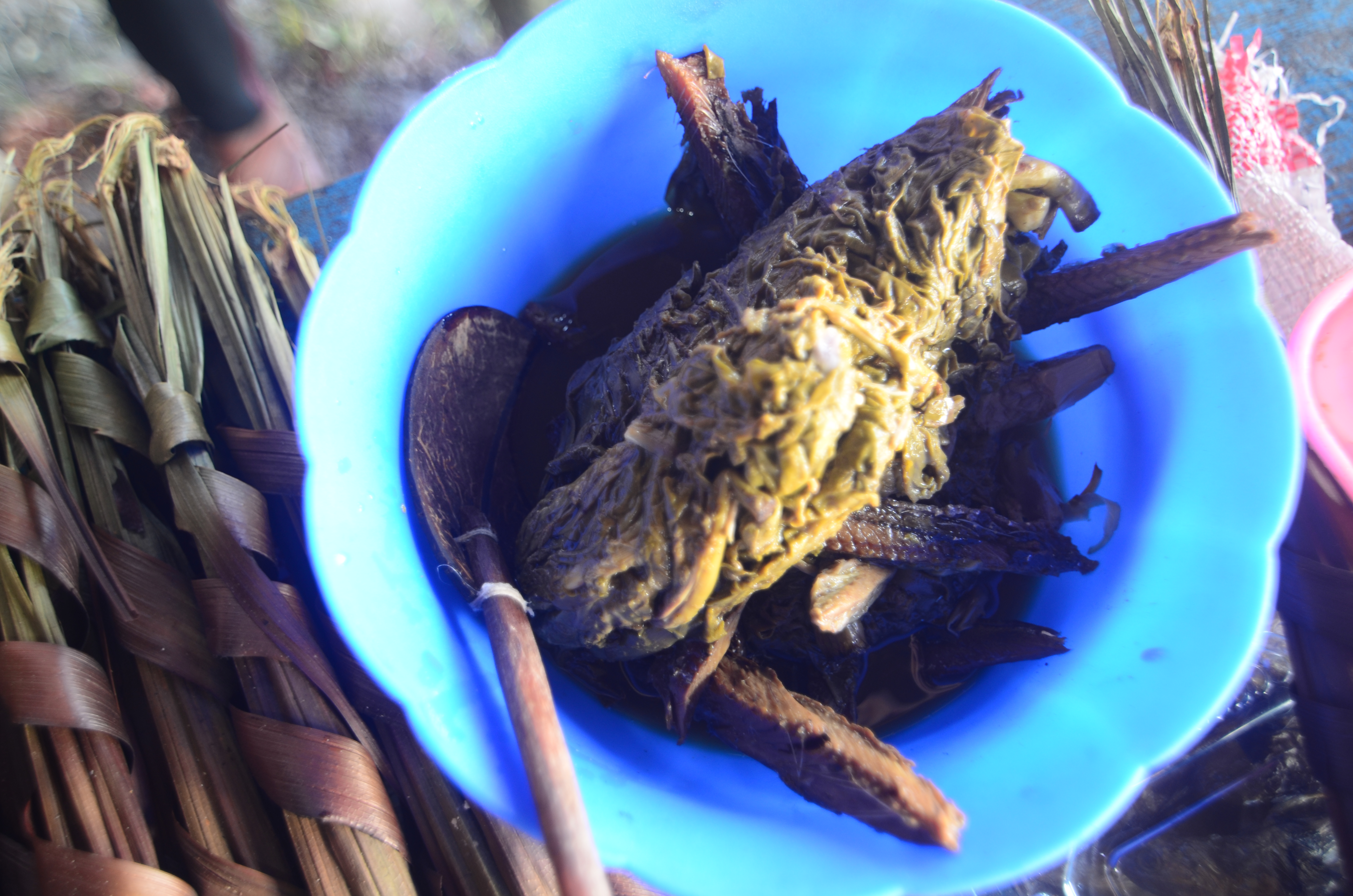
Lotlot

In Indonesia, taro is widely used for snacks, cakes, crackers, and even macarons, thus it can be easily found everywhere. Some varieties are specially cultivated in accordance with social or geographical traditions. Taro is usually known as "keladi", although other varieties are also known as "talas", among others. The vegetable soup, sayur asem and sayur lodeh may use taro and its leaves also lompong (taro stem) in Java. Chinese descendants in Indonesia often eat taro with stewed rice and dried shrimp. The taro is diced and cooked along with the rice, the shrimp, and sesame oil. In New Guinea, there are some traditional dishes made of taro as well its leaves such as keripik keladi (sweet spicy taro chips), keladi tumbuk, pounded taro with vegetables, and aunu senebre, anchovies mixed with slices of taro leaf. Mentawai people has a traditional food called lotlot, taro leaves cooked with tinimbok (smoked fish).

===== Philippines =====
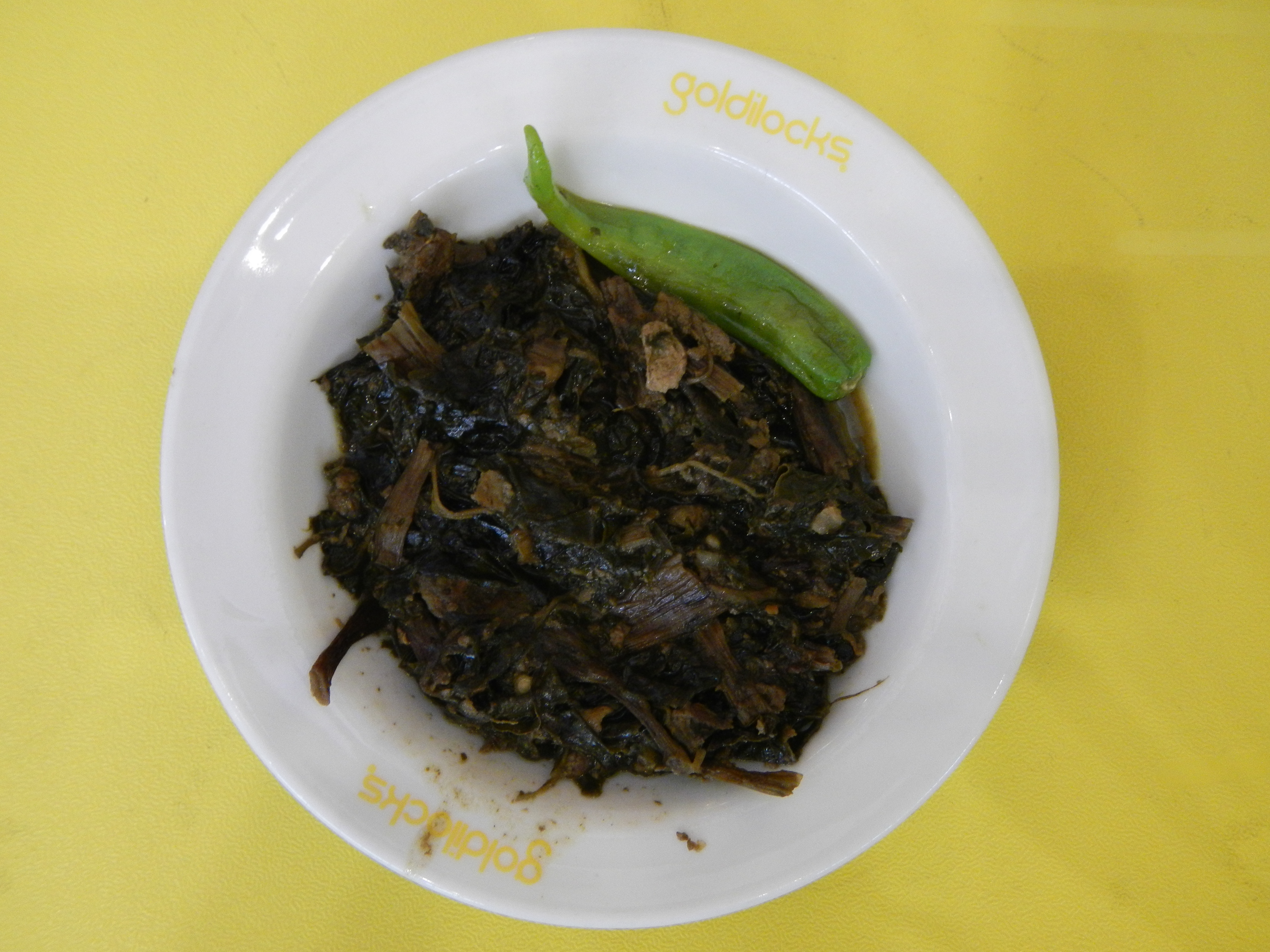
Laing

In the Philippines taro is usually called gabi, abi, or avi and is widely available throughout the archipelago. Its adaptability to marshland and swamps make it one of the most common vegetables in the Philippines. The leaves, stems, and corms are all consumed and form part of the local cuisine. A popular recipe for taro is laing from the Bicol Region; the dish's main ingredients are taro leaves (at times including stems) cooked in coconut milk, and salted with fermented shrimp or fish bagoong. It is sometimes heavily spiced with red hot chilies called siling labuyo. Another dish in which taro is commonly used is the Philippine national stew, sinigang, although radish can be used if taro is not available. This stew is made with pork and beef, shrimp, or fish, a souring agent (tamarind fruit, kamias, etc.) with the addition of peeled and diced corms as thickener. The corm is also prepared as a basic ingredient for ginataan, a coconut milk and taro dessert.

===== Thailand =====
In Thai cuisine, taro Thai: เผือก (pheuak) is used in a variety of ways depending on the region. Boiled taro is readily available in the market packaged in small cellophane bags, already peeled and diced, and eaten as a snack. Pieces of boiled taro with coconut milk are a traditional Thai dessert. Raw taro is also often sliced and deep fried and sold in bags as chips (เผือกทอด). As in other Asian countries, taro is a popular flavor for ice cream in Thailand.

===== Vietnam =====
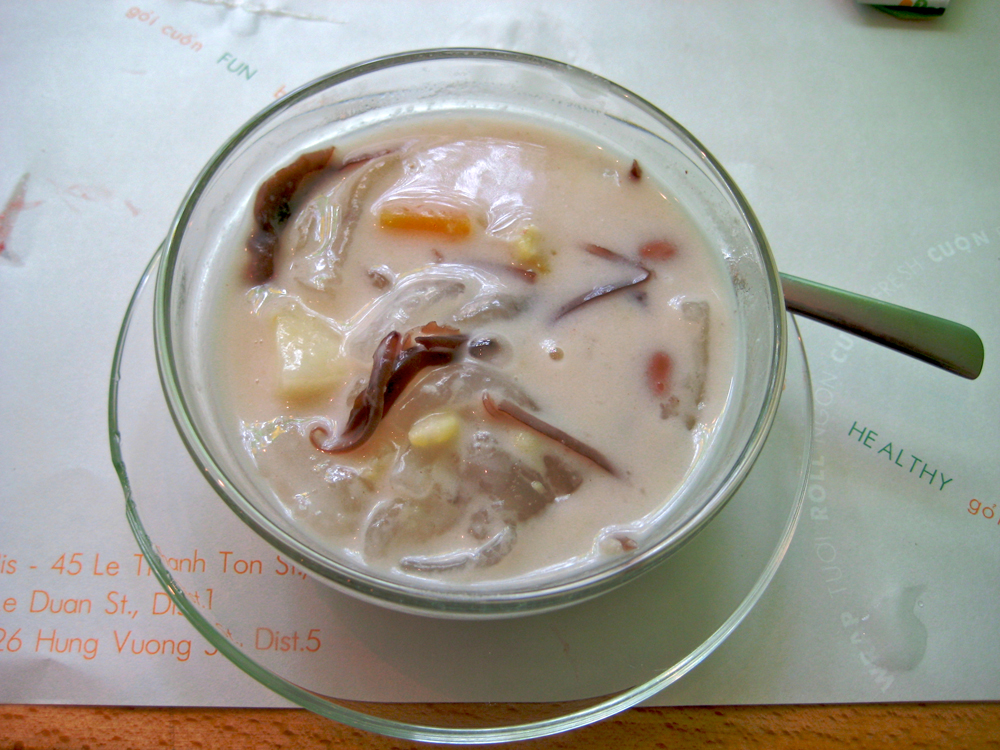
Chè khoai môn

In Vietnam, there is a large variety of taro plants. One is called khoai môn, which is used as a filling in spring rolls, cakes, puddings and sweet soup desserts, smoothies and other desserts. Taro is used in the Tết dessert chè khoai môn, which is sticky rice pudding with taro roots. The stems are also used in soups such as canh chua. One is called khoai sọ, which is smaller in size than khoai môn. Another common taro plant grows roots in shallow waters and grows stems and leaves above the surface of the water. This taro plant has saponin-like substances that cause a hot, itchy feeling in the mouth and throat. Northern farmers used to plant them to cook the stems and leaves to feed their hogs. They re-grew quickly from their roots. After cooking, the saponin in the soup of taro stems and leaves is reduced to a level the hogs can eat. Today this practice is no longer popular in Vietnamese agriculture. These taro plants are commonly called khoai ngứa, which literally means "itchy potato".

==== South Asia ====
Taro roots are commonly known as Arbi or Arvi in Urdu and Hindi language. It is a common dish in Northern India and Pakistan. Arbi Gosht (meat) Masala Recipe is a tangy mutton curry recipe with taro vegetable. Mutton and Arbi is cooked in whole spices and tomatoes which lends a wonderful taste to the dish.

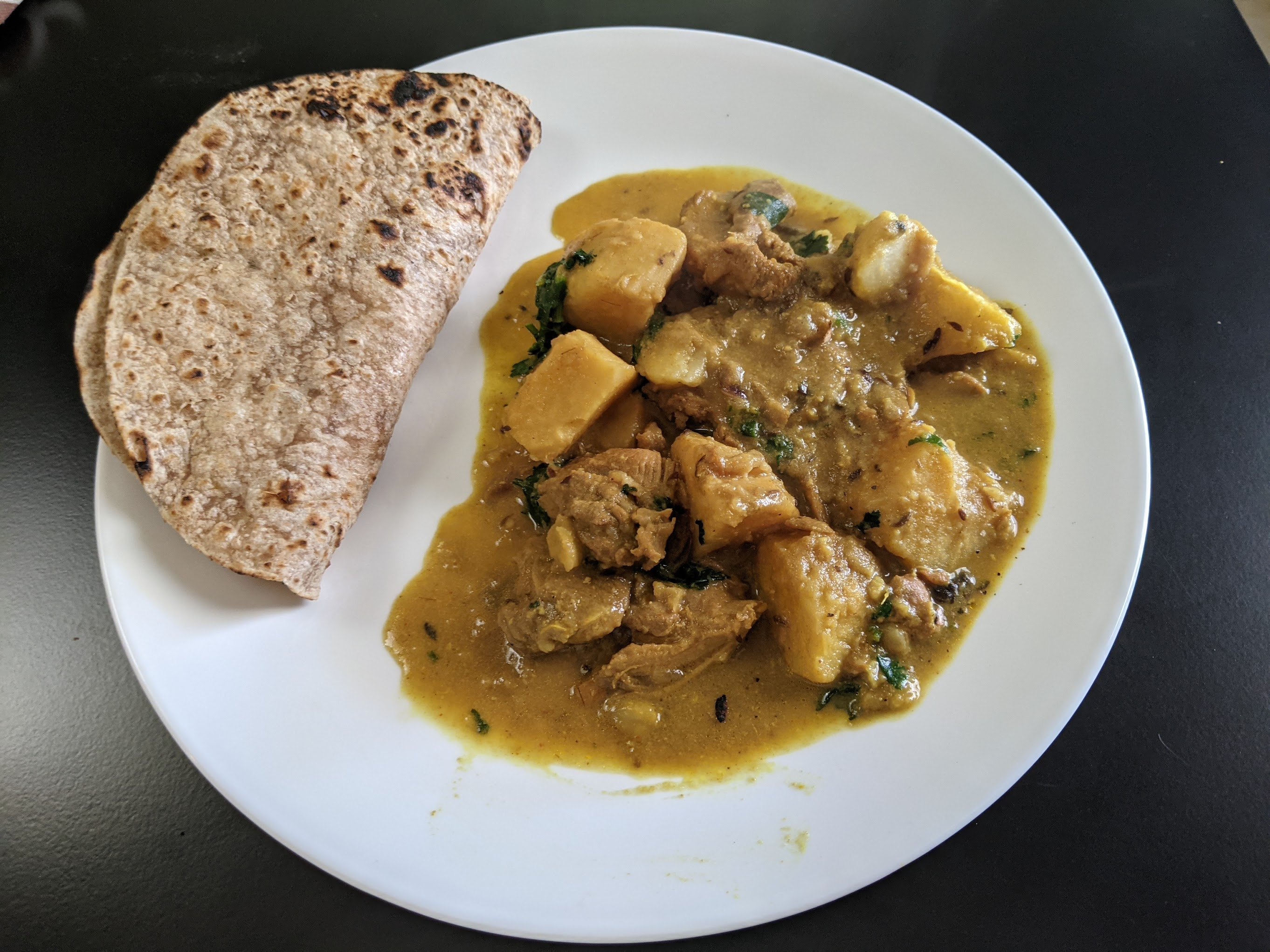
Arbi Gosht

===== Bangladesh =====
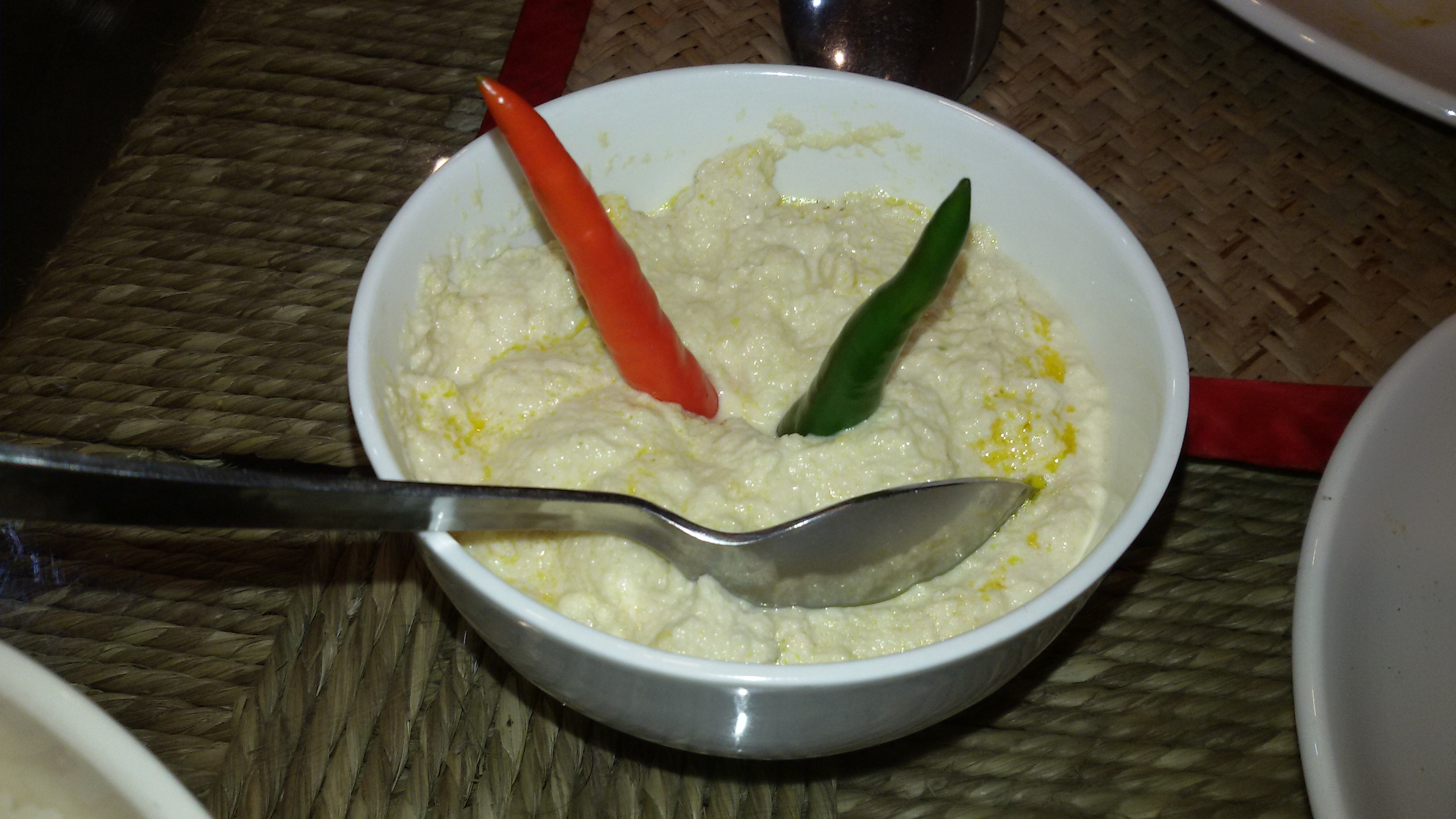
Kochu bata

In Bangladesh taro is a very popular vegetable known as kochu (কচু) or mukhi (মুখি). Within the Sylheti language, it is called mukhi. It is usually cooked with small prawns or the ilish fish into a curry, but some dishes are cooked with dried fish. Its green leaves, kochu pata (কচু পাতা), and stem, kochu (কচু), are also eaten as a favorite dish and usually ground to a paste or finely chopped to make shak — but it must be boiled well beforehand. Taro stolons or stems, kochur loti (কচুর লতি), are also favored by Bangladeshis and cooked with shrimp, dried fish or the head of the ilish fish. Taro is available, either fresh or frozen, in the UK and US in most Asian stores and supermarkets specialising in Sylheti, Bangladeshi or South Asian food. Also, another variety called maan kochu is consumed and is a rich source of vitamins and nutrients. Maan Kochu is made into a paste and fried to prepare a food known as Kochu Bata.

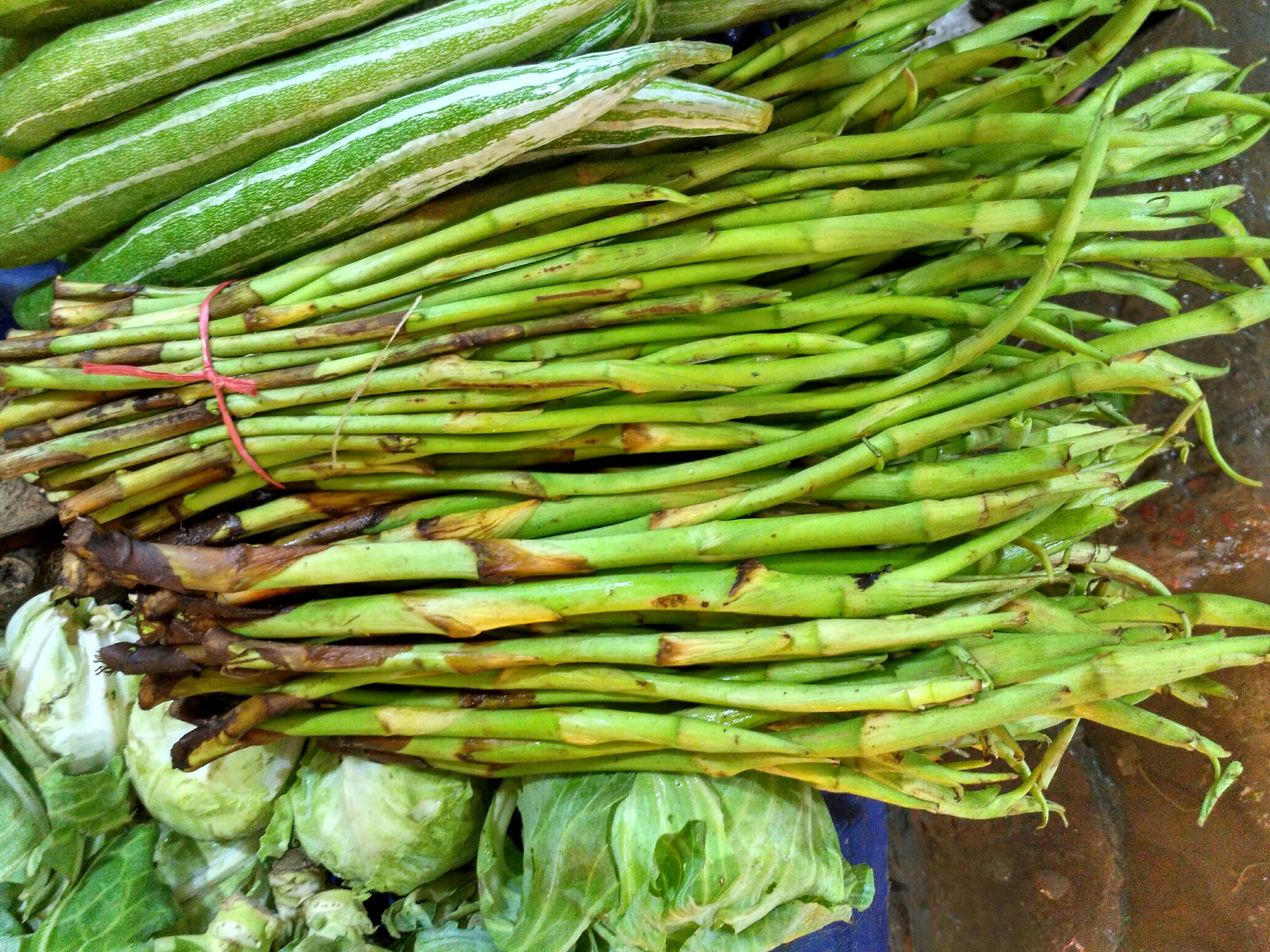
Taro stolons at a market in Dhaka

===== India =====
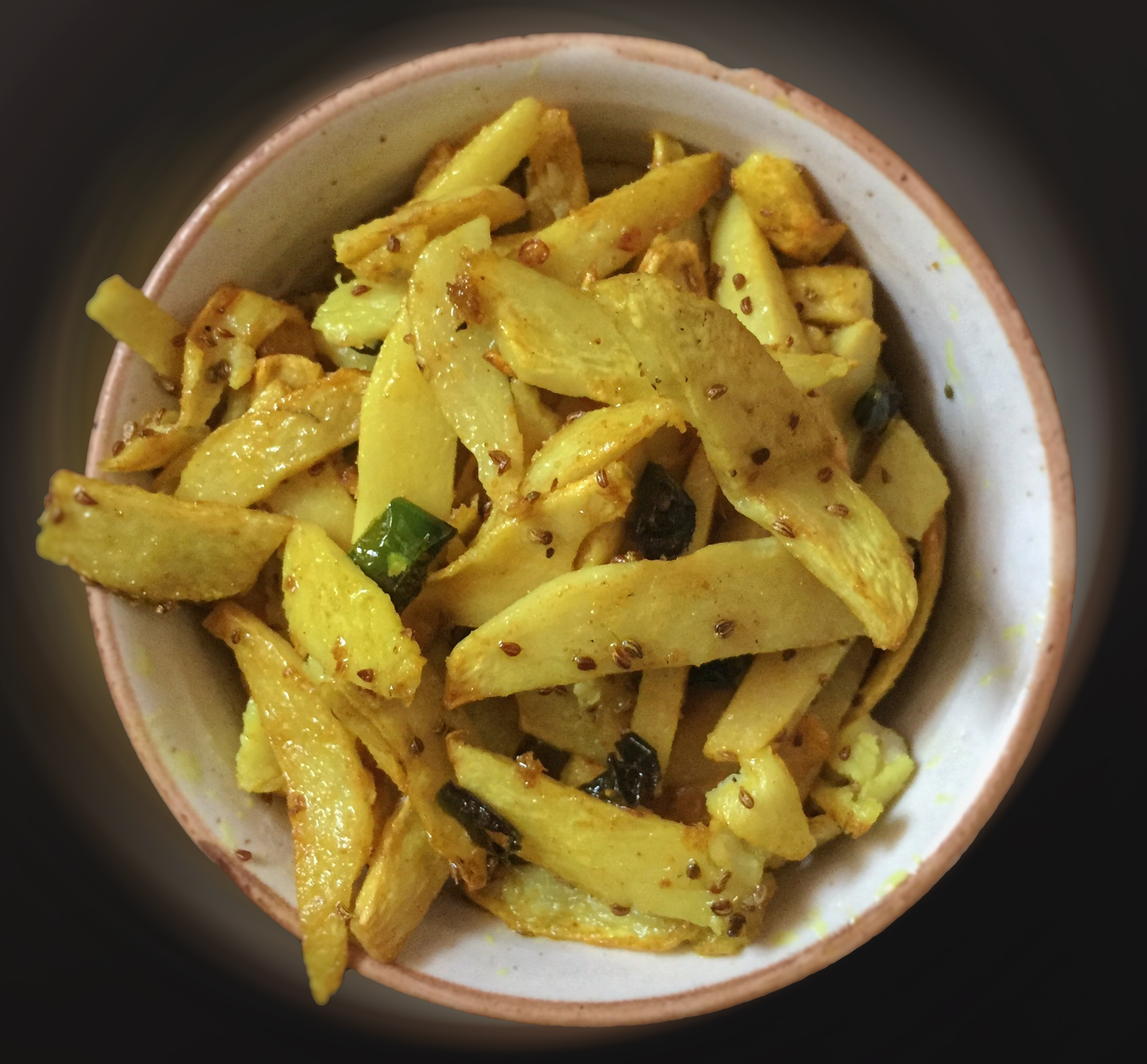
Saru bhaja

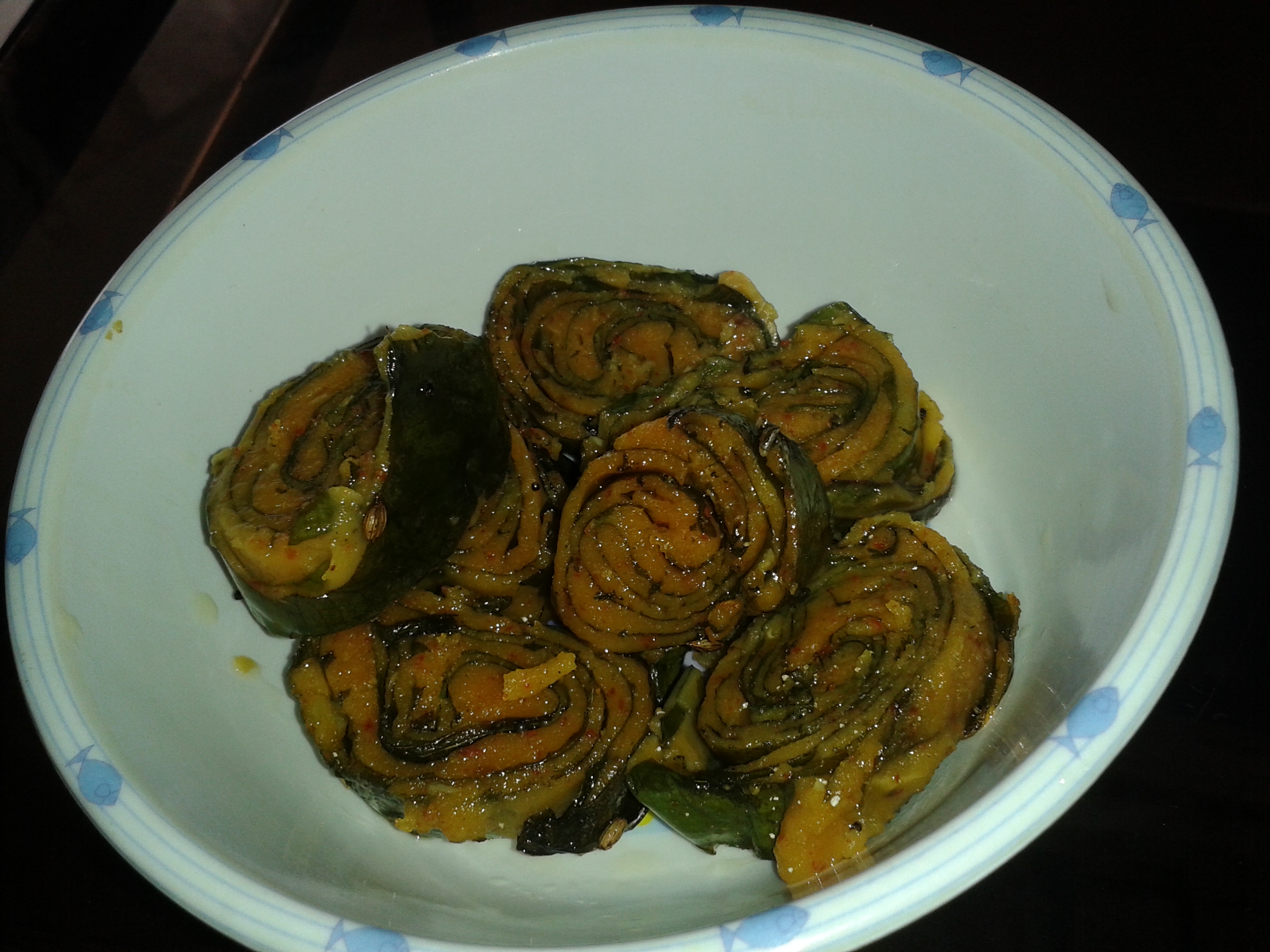
Patrode

In India, taro or eddoe is a common dish served in many ways.

In Mizoram, in north-eastern India, it is called bäl; the leaves, stalks and corms are eaten as dawl bai. The leaves and stalks are often traditionally preserved to be eaten in dry season as dawl rëp bai.

In Assam, a north-eastern state, taro is known as kosu (কচু). Various parts of the plant are eaten by making different dishes. The leaf buds called kosu loti (কচু লতি) are cooked with sour dried fruits and called thekera (থেকেৰা) or sometimes eaten alongside tamarind, elephant apple, a small amount of pulses, or fish. Similar dishes are prepared from the long root-like structures called kosu thuri. A sour fried dish is made from its flower (kosu kala). Porridges are made from the corms themselves, which may also be boiled, seasoned with salt and eaten as snacks.

In Manipur, another north-eastern state, taro is known as pan. The Kukis calls it bal. Boiled bal is a snack at lunch along with chutney or hot chili-flakes besides being cooked as a main dish along with smoked or dried meat, beans, and mustard leaves. Sun-dried taro leaves are later used in broth and stews. It is widely available and is eaten in many forms, either baked, boiled, or cooked into a curry with hilsa or with fermented soybeans called hawai-zaar. The leaves are also used in a special traditional dish called utti, cooked with peas.

It is called arbi in Urdu/Hindi and arvi in Punjabi in north India. It is called kəchu (कचु) in Sanskrit.

In Himachal Pradesh, in northern India, taro corms are known as ghandyali, and the plant is known as kachalu in the Kangra and Mandi districts. The dish called patrodu is made using taro leaves rolled with corn or gram flour and boiled in water. Another dish, pujji is made with mashed leaves and the trunk of the plant and ghandyali or taro corms are prepared as a separate dish. In Shimla, a pancake-style dish, called patra or patid, is made using gram flour.

In Uttarakhand and neighboring Nepal, taro is considered a healthy food and is cooked in a variety of ways. The delicate gaderi (taro variety) of Kumaon, especially from Lobanj, Bageshwar district, is much sought after. Most commonly it is boiled in tamarind water until tender, then diced into cubes which are stir-fried in mustard oil with fenugreek leaves. Another technique for preparation is boiling it in salt water till it is reduced to a porridge. The young leaves called gaaba, are steamed, sun-dried, and stored for later use. Taro leaves and stems are pickled. Crushed leaves and stems are mixed with de-husked urad daal (black lentils) and then dried as small balls called badi. These stems may also be sun-dried and stored for later use. On auspicious days, women worship saptarshi ("seven sages") and only eat rice with taro leaves.

In Maharashtra, in western India, the leaves, called alu che paana, are de-veined and rolled with a paste of gram flour. Then seasoned with tamarind paste, red chili powder, turmeric, coriander, asafoetida and salt, and finally steamed. These can be eaten whole, cut into pieces, or shallow fried and eaten as a snack known as alu chi wadi. Alu chya panan chi patal bhaji a lentil and colocasia leaves curry, is also popular. In Goan as well as Konkani cuisine taro leaves are very popular. A tall-growing variety of taro is extensively used on the western coast of India to make patrode, patrade, or patrada (lit. 'leaf-pancake') a dish with gram flour, tamarind and other spices.

In Gujarat, it is called patar vel or saryia na paan. Gram flour, salt, turmeric, and red chili powder are made into paste and stuffed inside a roll of green taro leaves. Then the mixture is steamed, divided into small portions, and fried.

Sindhis call it kachaloo; they fry it, compress it, and re-fry it to make a dish called tuk which complements Sindhi curry.

In Kerala, a state in southern India, taro corms are known as chembu kizhangu (ചേമ്പ് കിഴങ്ങ്) and are a staple food, a side dish, and an ingredient in various side dishes like sambar. As a staple food, it is steamed and eaten with a spicy chutney of green chilies, tamarind, and shallots. The leaves and stems of certain varieties of taro are also used as a vegetable in Kerala. In Dakshin Kannada in Karnataka, it is used as a breakfast dish, either made like fritters or steamed.

In Tamil Nadu and Andhra Pradesh, taro corms are known as sivapan-kizhangu (seppankilangu or cheppankilangu), chamagadda, or in coastal Andhra districts as chaama dumpa. They can be prepared in a variety of ways, such as by deep-frying the steamed and sliced corms in oil known as chamadumpa chips to be eaten on the side with rice, or cooking in a tangy tamarind sauce with spices, onion, and tomato.

In the east Indian state of West Bengal, taro corms are thinly sliced and fried to make chips called kochu bhaja(কচু ভাজা). The stem is used to cook kochur saag (কচুর শাগ) with fried hilsha (ilish) head or boiled chhola (chickpea), often eaten as a starter with hot rice. The corms are also made into a paste with spices and eaten with rice. The most popular dish is a spicy curry made with prawn and taro corms. Gathi kochu (গাঠি কচু) (taro variety) are very popular and used to make a thick curry called gathi kochur dal (গাঠি কচুর ডাল). Here kochur loti (কচুর লতি) (taro stolon) dry curry is a popular dish which is usually prepared with poppy seeds and mustard paste. Leaves and corms of shola kochu (শলা কচু) and maan kochu (মান কচু) are also used to make some popular traditional dishes.

In Mithila, Bihar, taro corms are known as ədua (अडुआ) and its leaves are called ədikunch ke paat (अड़िकंच के पात). A curry of taro leaves is made with mustard paste and sour sun-dried mango pulp (आमिल; aamil).

In Odisha, taro corms are known as saru. Dishes made of taro include saru besara (taro in mustard and garlic paste). It is also an indispensable ingredient in preparing dalma, an Odia cuisine staple (vegetables cooked with dal). Sliced taro corms, deep fried in oil and mixed with red chili powder and salt, are known as saru chips.

===== Maldives =====
Ala was widely grown in the southern atolls of Addu Atoll, Fuvahmulah, Huvadhu Atoll, and Laamu Atoll and is considered a staple even after rice was introduced. Ala and olhu ala are still widely eaten all over the Maldives, cooked or steamed with salt to taste, and eaten with grated coconut along with chili paste and fish soup. It is also prepared as a curry. The corms are sliced and fried to make chips and are also used to prepare varieties of sweets.

===== Nepal =====
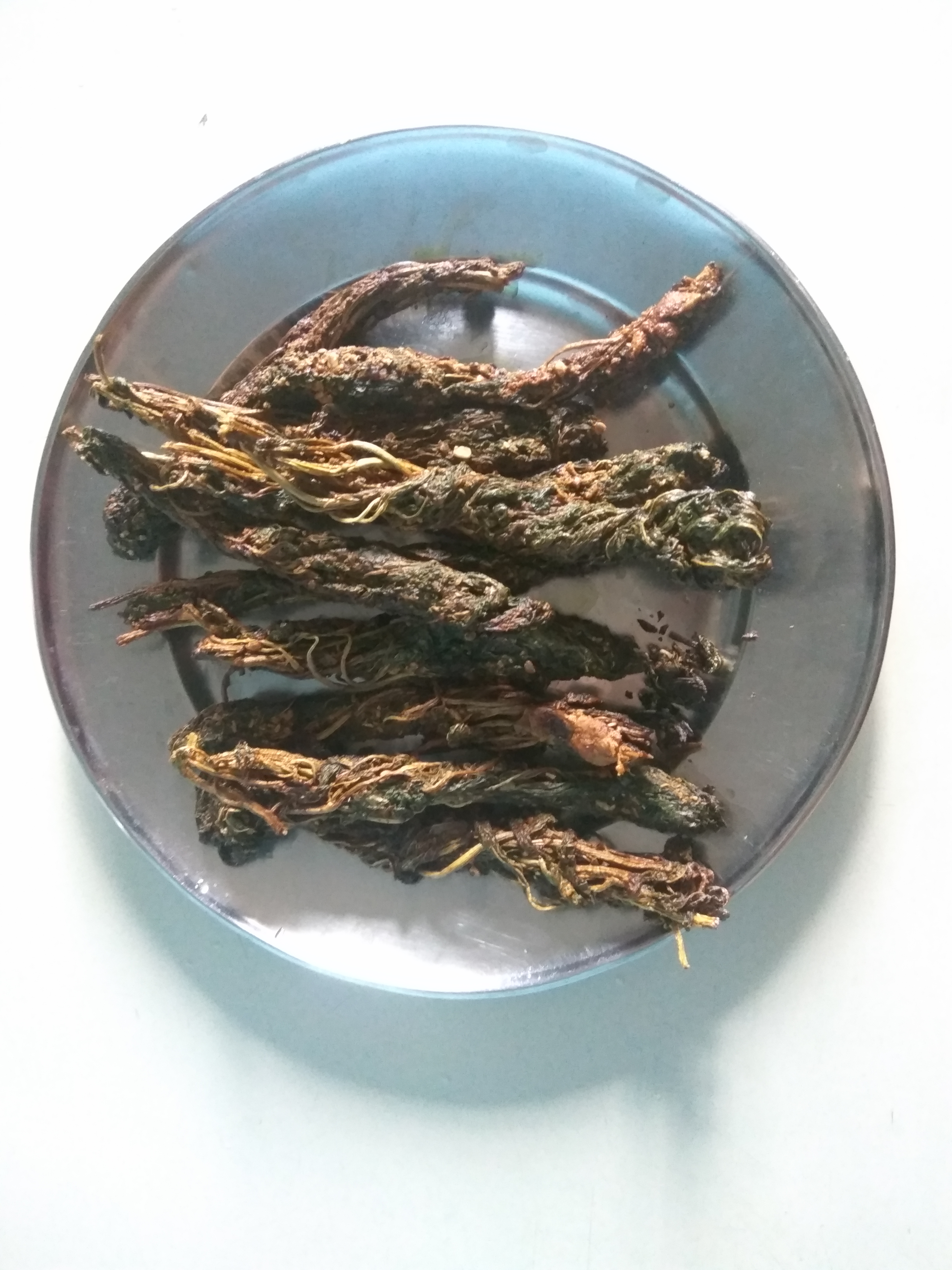
Arikanchan is prepared from taro leaves, black lentils paste and spices in mostly the Eastern Terai of Nepal, is traditional and indigenous food.

Taro is grown in the Terai and the hilly regions of Nepal. The root (corm) of taro is known as pindalu (पिँडालु) and petioles with leaves are known as karkalo (कर्कलो), Gava (गाभा) and also Kaichu (कैचु) in Maithili. Almost all parts are eaten in different dishes. Boiled corm of Taro is commonly served with salt, spices, and chilies. Taro is a popular dish in the hilly region. Chopped leaves and petioles are mixed with Urad bean flour to make dried balls called maseura (मस्यौरा). Large taro leaves are used as an alternative to an umbrella when unexpected rain occurs. Popular attachment to taro since ancient times is reflected in popular culture, such as in songs and textbooks. Jivan hamro karkala ko pani jastai ho (जीवन हाम्रो कर्कलाको पानी जस्तै हो) means, "Our life is as vulnerable as water stuck in the leaf of taro".

Taro is cultivated and eaten by the Tharu people in the Inner Terai as well. Roots are mixed with dried fish and turmeric, then dried in cakes called sidhara which are curried with radish, chili, garlic and other spices to accompany rice. The Tharu prepare the leaves in a fried vegetable side-dish that also shows up in Maithili cuisine.

===== Pakistan =====
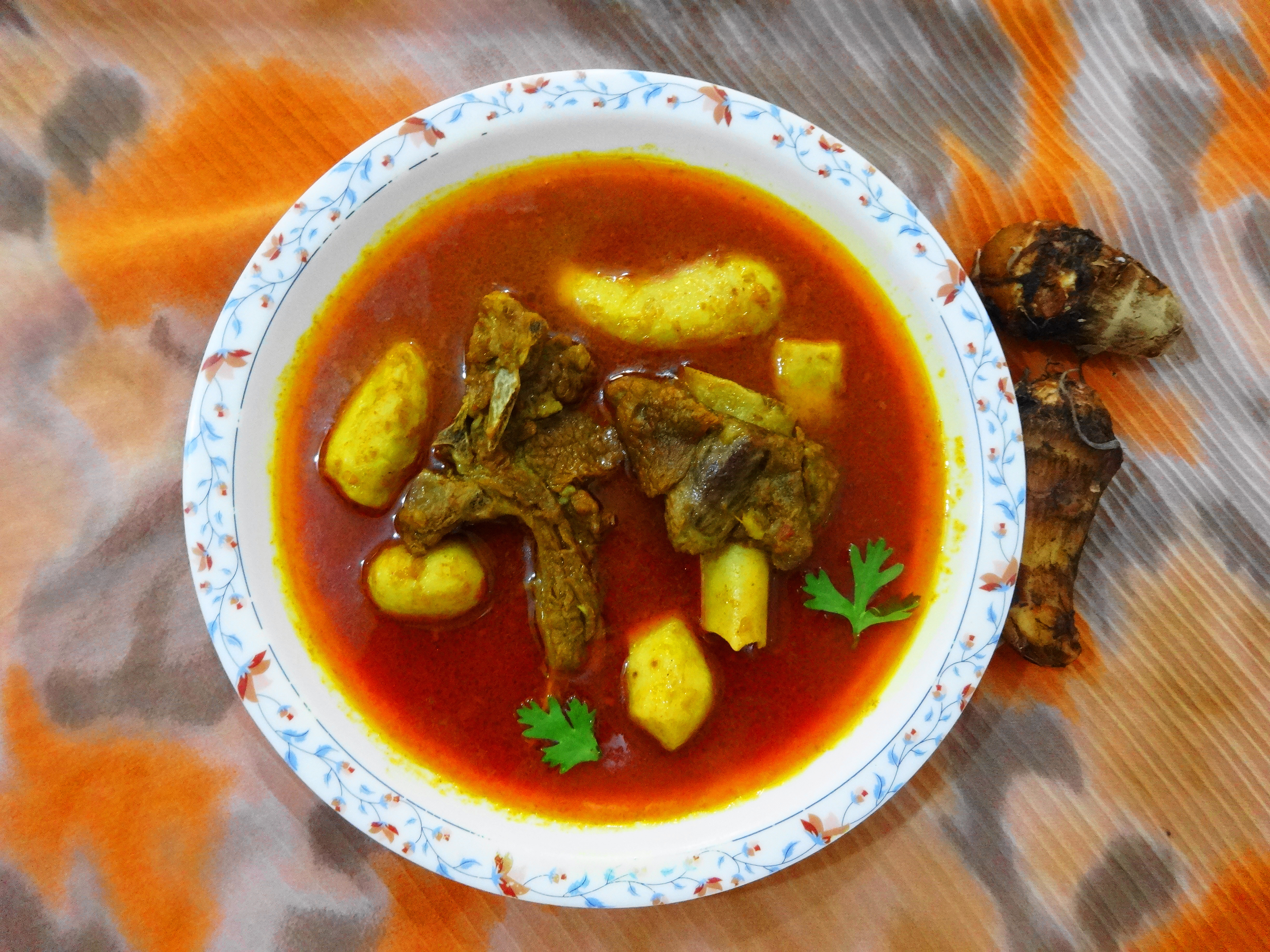
Arvi gosht

In Pakistan, taro or eddoe or arvi is a very common dish served with or without gravy; a popular dish is arvi gosht, which includes beef, lamb or mutton. The leaves are rolled along with gram flour batter and then fried or steamed to make a dish called Pakora, which is finished by tempering with red chilies and carrom (ajwain) seeds. Taro or arvi is also cooked with chopped spinach. The dish called Arvi Palak is the second most renowned dish made of Taro.

===== Sri Lanka =====
Many varieties are recorded in Sri Lanka. Edible varieties (such as kiri ala, kolakana ala, gahala, and sevel ala) are grown for their corms and leaves. Sri Lankans eat corms after boiling them or making them into a curry with coconut milk. Some varieties of the leaves of kolakana ala and kalu alakola are eaten.

==== Middle East and Europe ====
Taro was consumed by the early Romans in much the same way the potato is today. They called this root vegetable colocasia. The Roman cookbook Apicius mentions several methods for preparing taro, including boiling, preparing with sauces, and cooking with meat or fowl. After the fall of the Roman Empire, the use of taro dwindled in Europe. This was largely due to the decline of trade and commerce with Egypt, previously controlled by Rome. When the Spanish and Portuguese sailed to the new world, they brought taro along with them. Recently there has been renewed interest in exotic foods and consumption is increasing.

===== Cyprus =====
In Cyprus, taro has been in use since the time of the Roman Empire. Today it is known as kolokas in Turkish or kolokasi (κολοκάσι) in Greek, which comes from the Ancient Greek name κολοκάσιον (kolokasion) for lotus root. It is usually sauteed with celery and onion with pork, chicken or lamb, in a tomato sauce – a vegetarian version is also available. The cormlets are called poulles (sing. poulla), and they are prepared by first being sauteed, followed by decaramelising the vessel with dry red wine and coriander seeds, and finally served with freshly squeezed lemon.

===== Greece =====
In Greece, taro grows on Icaria. Icarians credit taro for saving them from famine during World War II. They boil it until tender and serve it as a salad.

===== Lebanon =====
In Lebanon, taro is known as kilkass and is grown mainly along the Mediterranean coast. The leaves and stems are not consumed in Lebanon and the variety grown produces round to slightly oblong tubers that vary in size from a tennis ball to a small cantaloupe. Kilkass is a very popular winter dish in Lebanon and is prepared in two ways: kilkass with lentils is a stew flavored with crushed garlic and lemon juice and 'il'as (Lebanese pronunciation of قلقاس) bi-tahini. Another common method of preparing taro is to boil, peel then slice it into 1 cm (1/2 in) thick slices, before frying and marinating in edible "red" sumac. In northern Lebanon, it is known as a potato with the name borshoushi (el-orse borshushi). It is also prepared as part of a lentil soup with crushed garlic and lemon juice. Also in the north, it is known by the name bouzmet, mainly around Menieh, where it is first peeled, and left to dry in the sun for a couple of days. After that, it is stir-fried in lots of vegetable oil in a casserole until golden brown, then a large amount of wedged, melted onions are added, in addition to water, chickpeas and some seasoning. These are all left to simmer for a few hours, and the result is a stew-like dish. It is considered a hard-to-make delicacy, not only because of the tedious preparation but the consistency and flavour that the taro must reach. The smaller variety of taro is more popular in the north due to its tenderness.

===== Portugal =====
In the Azores taro is known as inhame or inhame-coco and is commonly steamed with potatoes, vegetables and meats or fish. The leaves are sometimes cooked into soups and stews. It is also consumed as a dessert after first being steamed and peeled, then fried in vegetable oil or lard, and finally sprinkled with sugar, cinnamon and nutmeg. Taro grows abundantly in the fertile land of the Azores, as well as in creeks that are fed by mineral springs. Through migration to other countries, the inhame is found in the Azorean diaspora.

===== Turkey =====
Taro (Turkish: gölevez) is grown in the south coast of Turkey, especially in Mersin, Bozyazı, Anamur and Antalya. It is boiled in a tomato sauce or cooked with meat, beans and chickpeas. It is often used as a substitute for potato.

==== Africa ====
===== Egypt =====
In Egypt, taro is known as qolqas (Egyptian Arabic: قلقاس, IPA: [ʔolˈʔæːs]). The corms are larger than what would be found in North American supermarkets. After being peeled completely, it is cooked in one of two ways: cut into small cubes and cooked in broth with fresh coriander and chard and served as an accompaniment to meat stew, or sliced and cooked with minced meat and tomato sauce.

===== Canarias =====
Taro has remained popular in the Canary Islands where it is known as ñame and is often used in thick vegetable stews, like potaje de berros (cress potage) or simply boiled and seasoned with mojo or honey. In Canarian Spanish the word Ñame refers to Taro, while in other variants of Castilian is normally used to designate yams.

===== East Africa =====
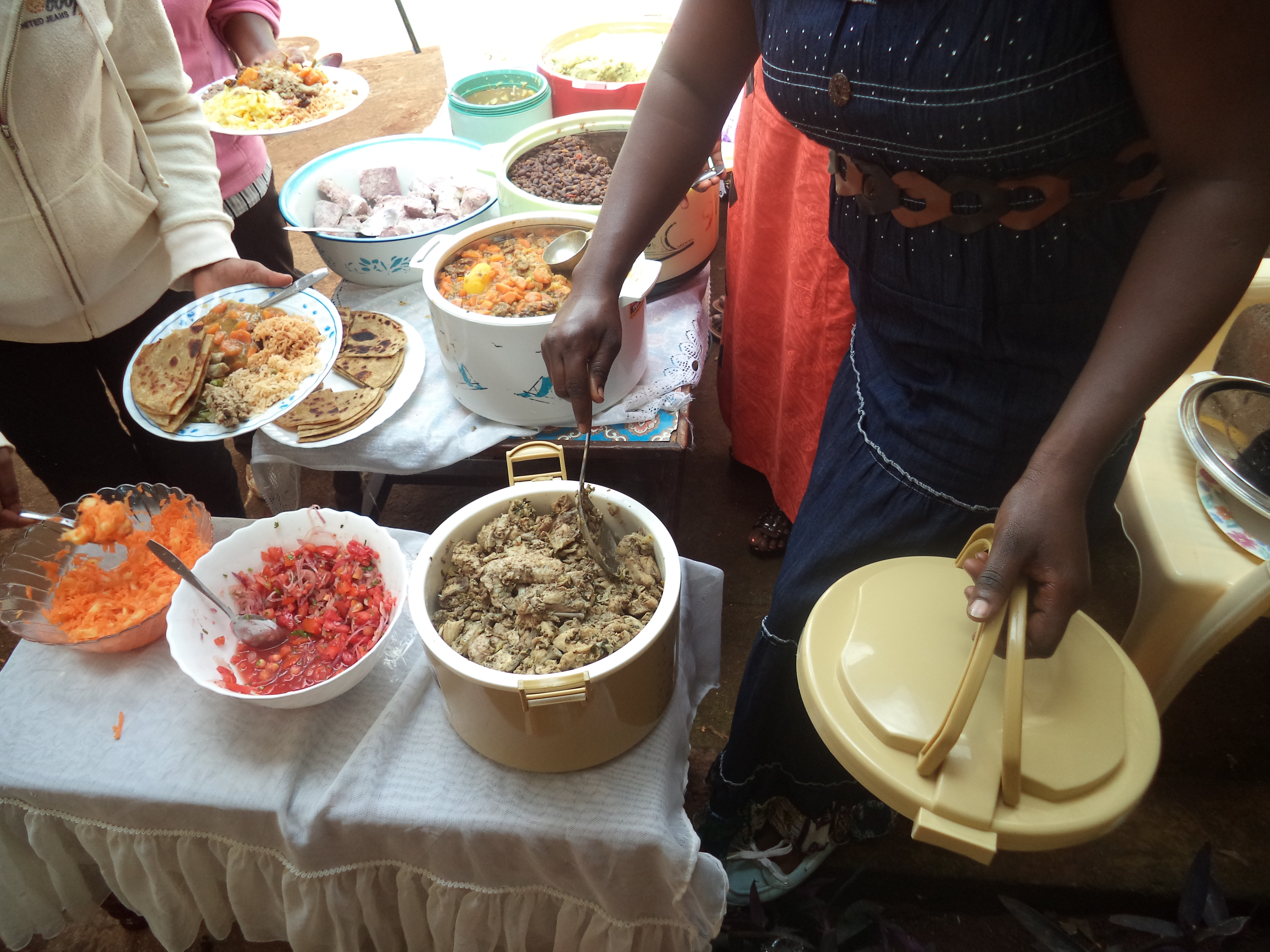
Njahi, Nduma, Chapati, Kachumbari, chicken – an average Kikuyu party mix

In Kenya, Uganda and Tanzania, taro is commonly known as arrow root, yam, amayuni (plural) or ejjuni (singular), ggobe, or nduma and madhumbe in some local Bantu languages. There are several varieties and each variety has its own local name. It is usually boiled and eaten with tea or other beverages, or as the main starch of a meal. It is also cultivated in Madagascar, Malawi, Mozambique, and Zimbabwe.

===== South Africa =====
It is known as amadumbe (plural) or idumbe (singular) in the Zulu language of Southern Africa.

===== West Africa =====
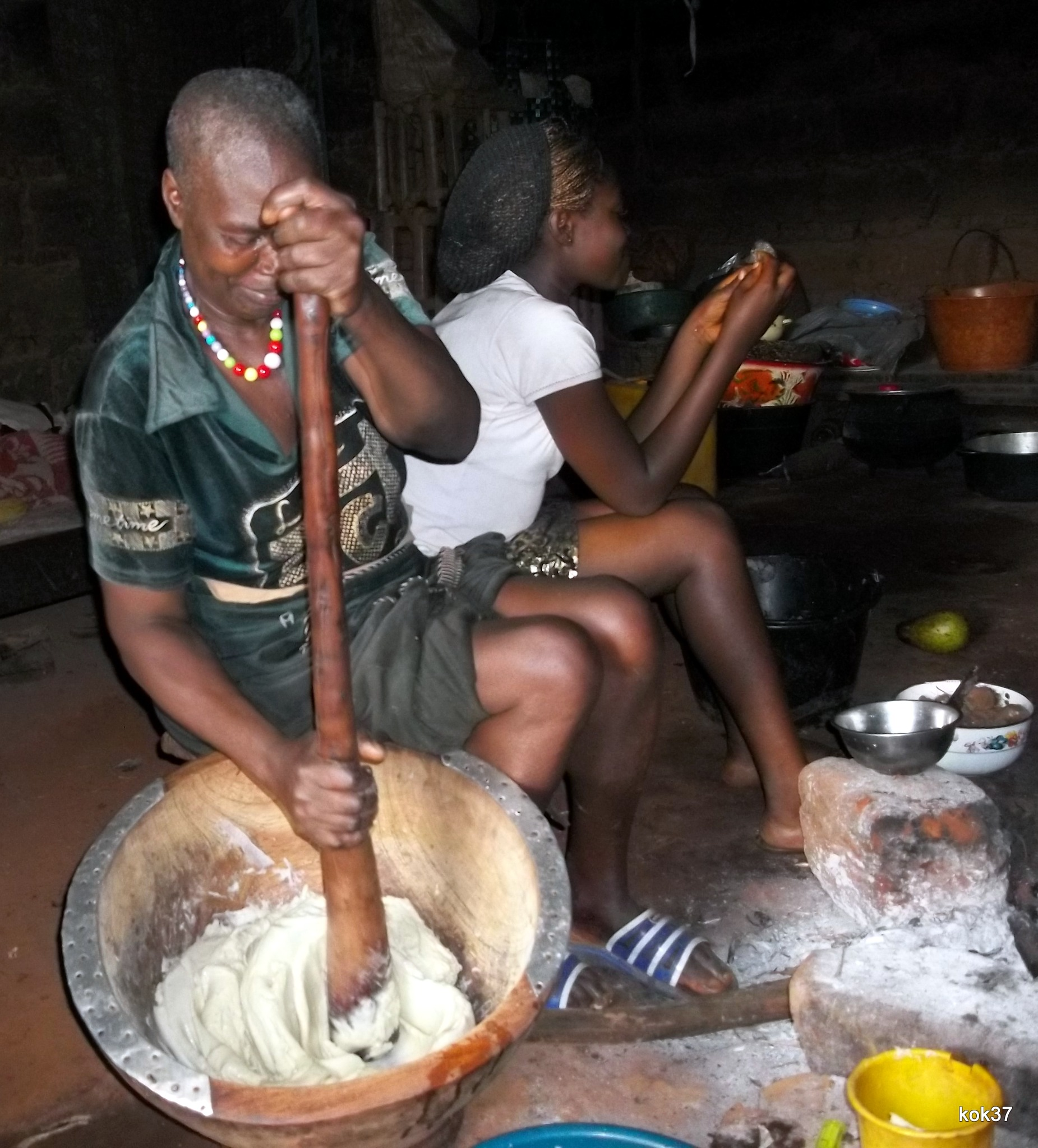
Making taro in Cameroon

Taro is consumed as a staple crop in West Africa, particularly in Ghana, Nigeria and Cameroon. It is called cocoyam in Nigeria, Ghana also Twi language (brobe) and Anglophone Cameroon, macabo in Francophone Cameroon, in Democratic Republic of Congo or Republic of Congo mbálá ya makoko, mankani in Hausa language, koko and lambo in Yoruba, and ede in Igbo language. Cocoyam is often boiled, fried, or roasted and eaten with a sauce. In Ghana, it substitutes for plantain in making fufu when plantains are out of season. It is also cut into small pieces to make a soupy baby food and appetizer called mpotompoto. It is also common in Ghana to find cocoyam chips (deep-fried slices, about 1 mm (1/32 in) thick). Cocoyam leaves, locally called kontomire in Ghana, are a popular vegetable for local sauces such as palaver sauce and egusi/agushi stew. It is also commonly consumed in Guinea and parts of Senegal, as a leaf sauce or as a vegetable side, and is referred to as jaabere in the local Pulaar dialect.

==== Americas ====
===== Brazil =====
In Lusophone countries, inhame (pronounced Portuguese pronunciation: [ĩ ˈɲɐ̃mi], Portuguese pronunciation: [ˈɲɐ̃mi] or Portuguese pronunciation: [ĩ ˈɲɐ̃mi], literally "yam") and cará are the common names for various plants with edible parts of the genera Alocasia, Colocasia (family Araceae) and Dioscorea (family Dioscoreaceae), and its respective starchy edible parts, generally tubers, with the exception of Dioscorea bulbifera, called cará-moela (pronounced Portuguese pronunciation: [kɐˈɾa muˈɛlɐ], literally, "gizzard yam"), in Brazil and never deemed to be an inhame. Definitions of what constitutes an inhame and a cará vary regionally, but the common understanding in Brazil is that carás are potato-like in shape, while inhames are more oblong.

In the Brazilian Portuguese of the hotter and drier Northeastern region, both inhames and carás are called batata (literally, "potato"). For differentiation, potatoes are called batata-inglesa (literally, "English potato"), a name used in other regions and sociolects to differentiate it from the batata-doce, "sweet potato", ironic names since both were first cultivated by the indigenous peoples of South America, their native continent, and only later introduced in Europe by the colonizers.

Taros are often prepared like potatoes, eaten boiled, stewed or mashed, generally with salt and sometimes garlic as a condiment, as part of a meal (most often lunch or dinner).

===== Central America =====
In Belize, Costa Rica, Nicaragua and Panama, taro is eaten in soups, as a replacement for potatoes, and as chips. It is known locally as malanga (also malanga coco), a word of Bantu origin, and dasheen in Belize and Costa Rica, quiquizque in Nicaragua, and as otoe in Panama.

===== Haiti =====
In Haiti, it is usually called malanga, or taro. The corm is grated into a paste and deep-fried to make a fritter called Acra. Acra is a very popular street food in Haiti.

===== Jamaica =====
In Jamaica, taro is known as coco, cocoyam and dasheen. Corms with flesh which is white throughout are referred to as minty-coco. The leaves are also used to make Pepper Pot Soup which may include callaloo.

===== Suriname =====
In Suriname it is called tayer, taya, pomtayer or pongtaya. The taro root is called aroei by the indigenous Surinamese and is commonly known as "Chinese tayer". The variety known as eddoe is also called Chinese tayer. It is a popular cultivar among the Maroon population in the interior, also because it is not adversely affected by high water levels. The dasheen variety, commonly planted in swamps, is rare, although appreciated for its taste. The closely related Xanthosoma species is the base for the popular Surinamese dish pom. The cooked taro leaf (taya-wiri, or tayerblad) is also a well-known green leafy vegetable.

===== Trinidad and Tobago =====
In Trinidad and Tobago, it is called dasheen. The leaves of the taro plant are used to make the Trinidadian variant of the Caribbean dish known as callaloo (which is made with okra, dasheen/taro leaves, coconut milk or creme and aromatic herbs) and it is also prepared similarly to steamed spinach. The root of the taro plant is often served boiled, accompanied by stewed fish or meat, curried, often with peas and eaten with roti, or in soups. The leaves are also sautéed with onions, hot pepper and garlic til they are melted to make a dish called "bhaji". This dish is popular with Indo-Trinidadian people. The leaves are also fried in a split pea batter to make "saheena" (which has a crunchy exterior and soft interior), a fritter of Indian origin.

===== United States =====
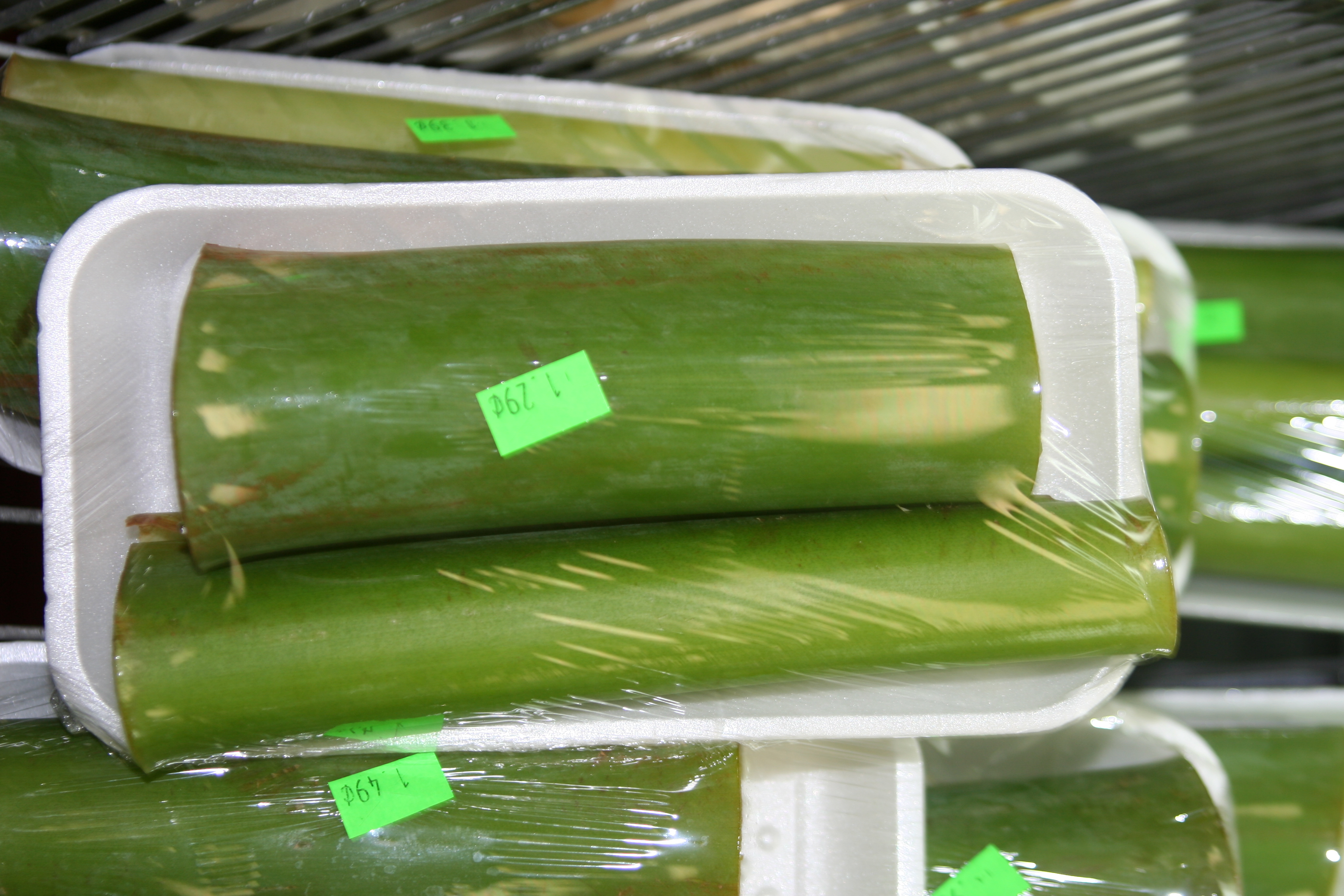
Taro leaf-stems (petioles) for sale at a market in California, 2009

Taro has been grown for centuries in the United States. William Bartram observed South Carolina Sea Islands residents eating roasted roots of the plant, which they called tanya, in 1791, and by the 19th century it was common as a food crop from Charleston to Louisiana. In the 1920s, dasheen (Note: The word dasheen originated in Trinidad and is said to be a corruption of de la Chine or da Chine, i.e. taro de la Chine.), as it was known, was highly touted by the Secretary of the Florida Department of Agriculture as a valuable crop for growth in muck fields. Fellsmere, Florida, near the east coast, was a farming area deemed perfect for growing dasheen. It was used in place of potatoes and dried to make flour. Dasheen flour was said to make excellent pancakes when mixed with wheat flour.

Poi is a Hawaiian cuisine staple food made from taro. Traditional poi is produced by mashing cooked starch on a wooden pounding board (papa kuʻi ʻai), with a carved pestle (pōhaku kuʻi ʻai) made from basalt, calcite, coral, or wood. Modern methods use an industrial food processor to produce large quantities for retail distribution. This initial paste is called paʻi ʻai. Water is added to the paste during mashing, and again just before eating, to achieve the desired consistency, which can range from highly viscous to liquid. In Hawaii, this is informally classified as either "one-finger", "two-finger", or "three-finger", alluding to how many fingers are required to scoop it up (the thicker the poi, the fewer fingers required to scoop a sufficient mouthful).

Since the late 20th century, taro chips have been available in many supermarkets and natural food stores, and taro is often used in American Chinatowns, in Chinese cuisine.

===== Venezuela =====
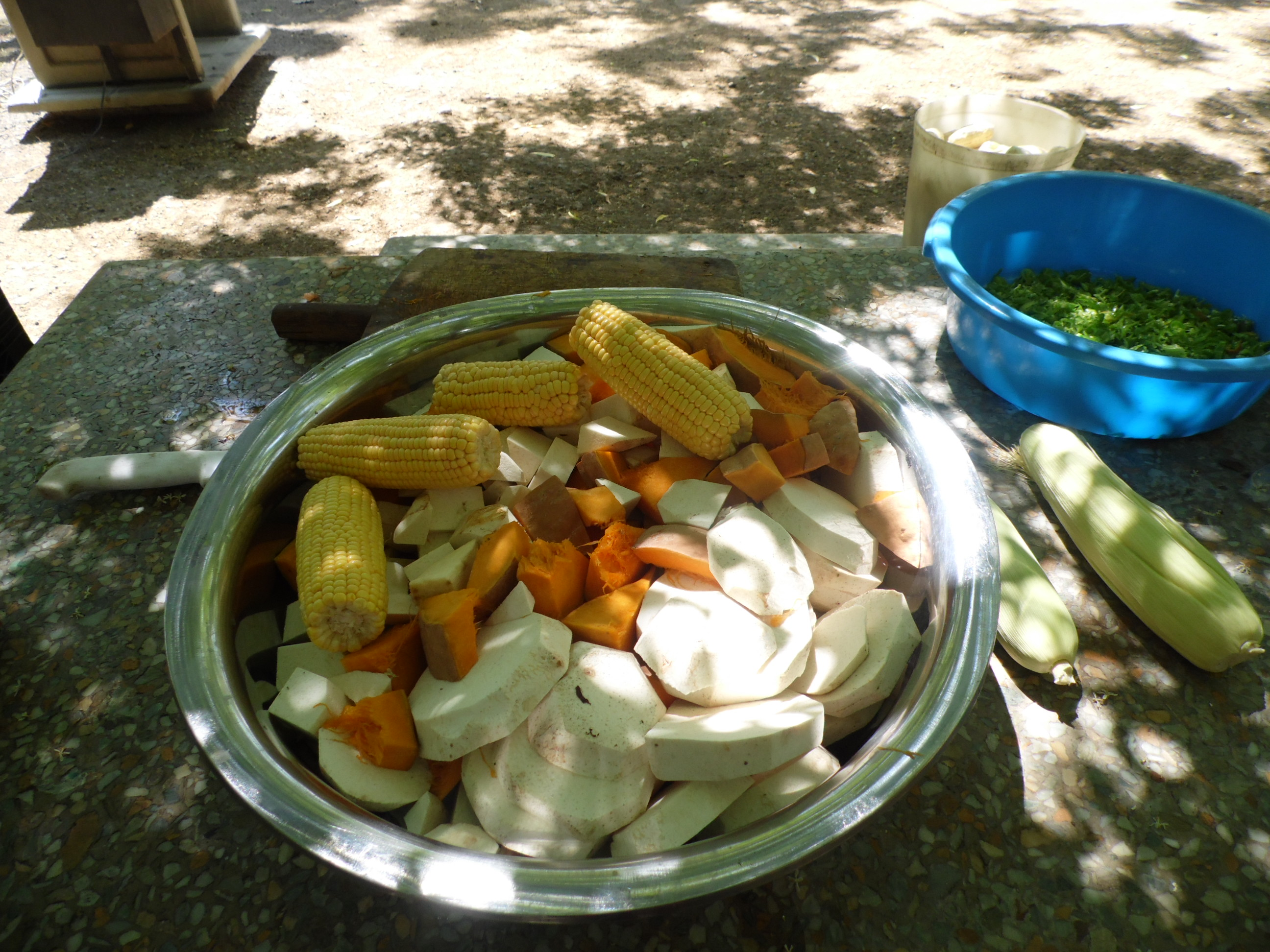
Chopped taro for preparing sopa de gallina

In Venezuela, taro is called ocumo chino or chino and used in soups and sancochos. Soups contain large chunks of several kinds of tubers, including ocumo chino, especially in the eastern part of the country, where West Indian influence is present. It is also used to accompany meats in parrillas (barbecue) or fried cured fish where yuca is not available. Ocumo is an indigenous name; chino means "Chinese", an adjective for produce that is considered exotic. Ocumo without the Chinese denomination is a tuber from the same family, but without taro's inside purplish color. Ocumo is the Venezuelan name for malanga, so ocumo chino means "Chinese malanga". Taro is always prepared boiled. No porridge form is known in the local cuisine.

===== West Indies =====
Taro is called dasheen, in contrast to the smaller variety of corms called eddo, or tanya in the English speaking countries of the West Indies, and is cultivated and consumed as a staple crop in the region. There are differences among the roots mentioned above: taro or dasheen is mostly blue when cooked, tanya is white and very dry, and eddoes are small and very slimy.

In the Spanish-speaking countries of the Spanish West Indies taro is called ñame, the Portuguese variant of which (inhame) is used in former Portuguese colonies where taro is still cultivated, including the Azores and Brazil. In Puerto Rico and Cuba, and the Dominican Republic it is sometimes called malanga or yautia. In some countries, such as Trinidad and Tobago, Saint Vincent and the Grenadines, and Dominica, the leaves and stem of the dasheen, or taro, are most often cooked and pureed into a thick liquid called callaloo, which is served as a side dish similar to creamed spinach. Callaloo is sometimes prepared with crab legs, coconut milk, pumpkin, and okra. It is usually served alongside rice or made into a soup along with various other roots.

=== Ornamental ===
It is also sold as an ornamental plant, often by the name of elephant ears. It can be grown indoors or outdoors with high humidity. In the UK, it has gained the Royal Horticultural Society's Award of Garden Merit.

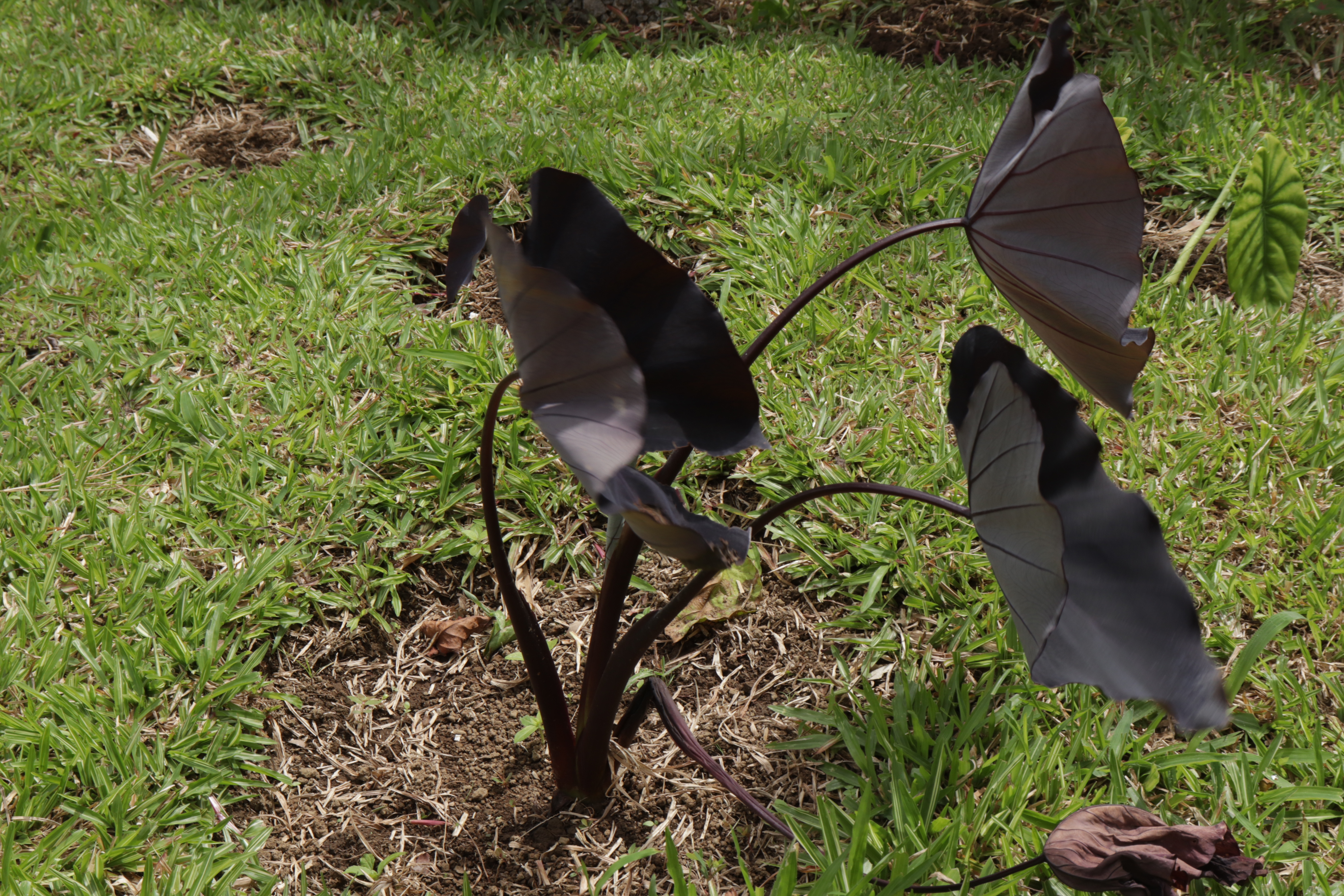
A matured variation of taro plant. With dark leaves that appear black, it's often referred to as "Black Magic".

=== Laboratory ===
It is also used for anthocyanin study experiments, especially with reference to abaxial and adaxial anthocyanic concentration. A recent study has revealed honeycomb-like microstructures on the taro leaf that make the leaves superhydrophobic. The measured contact angle on the leaf in this study is around 148°.

In Melissa K. Nelson's article Protecting the Sanctity of Native Foods, scientists at the University of Hawaii attempted to patent and genetically alter taro before being dissuaded by activists and farmers, "In 2006, the University of Hawaii withdrew its patents on the three varieties and agreed to stop genetically modifying Hawaii forms of taro. Researchers continue to experiment with modifying a Chinese form of taro, however."

=== Smoking ===
Taro leaves have been used in some Pacific Island communities for smoking wraps, although this was not necessarily for a tobacco-free experience. Instead, these leaves were likely used to wrap other smokable herbs with potential medicinal or psychoactive properties. However, there is a lack of scientific research on the safety of inhaling combusted taro leaves, and they might release harmful toxins when burned.

Coming closer to recent times Taro leaves have been used as a tobacco replacement as a "healthier" alternative, but the science is still to be proven if it is safer.

== In culture ==
In Meitei mythology and Meitei folklore of Manipur, Taro (Meitei: ꯄꯥꯟ, romanized: paan) plants are mentioned. One significant instance is the Meitei folktale of the Hanuba Hanubi Paan Thaaba (Meitei for 'Old Man and Old Woman planting Taro'). In this story, an old man and an old woman were deceived by some monkeys regarding the planting of the Taro plants in a very different way. The old man and woman followed the monkeys' advice, peeling off the best tubers of the plants, then boiling them in a pot until softened and after cooling them off, wrapping them in banana leaves and burying them. In the middle of the night, the monkeys secretly came into the farm and ate all the well-cooked plants. After their eating, the monkeys planted some inedible giant wild plants in the place where the old couple had placed the cooked plant tubers. In the morning, the old couple were amazed to see the plants getting fully grown up just after one day of planting the tubers. They were unaware of the tricks of the monkeys. So, the old couple cooked and ate the inedible wild taro plants. As a reaction of eating the wild plants, they suffered from the unbearable tingling sensation in their throats.

Native Hawaiians believe that the taro plant (kalo) grew out of the still-born body of one of the first two humans conceived by gods Hoʻohokukalani and Wākea; thus is connected to humans more than just providing sustenance. Thus, it is often a part of sacred offerings given in ceremonies.

In Cyprus a taro festival (Greek: Γιορτή Κολοκασ̌ιού) takes place every year in the village of Sotira.

=== Regional names ===
In Cyprus, Colocasia has been in use since the Roman Empire. Today it is known as kolokasi (Kολοκάσι). It is usually fried or cooked with corn, pork, or chicken, in a tomato sauce in casserole. "Baby" kolokasi is called poulles: after being fried dry, red wine and coriander seed are added, and then it is served with freshly squeezed lemon. Lately, some restaurants have begun serving thin slices of kolokasi deep fried, calling them "kolokasi chips".

In the Caribbean and West Indies, taro is known as dasheen in Trinidad and Tobago, Saint Lucia, Saint Vincent and the Grenadines and Jamaica. The leaves are known as aruiya ke bhaji by Indo-Trinidadian and Tobagonians.

In Portuguese, it is known simply as taro, as well as inhame, inhame-coco, taioba, taiova, taioba-de-são-tomé or matabala; in Spanish, it is called malanga.

In the Philippines, the whole plant is usually referred to as gabi, while the corm is called taro. Taro is a very popular flavor for milk tea in the country, and just as popular ingredient in several Filipino savory dishes such as sinigang.

Other names include idumbe in the KwaZulu-Natal region, and boina in the Wolaita language of Ethiopia. In Tanzania, it is called magimbi in the Swahili language. It is also called eddo in Liberia.

Names for taro
| Name | Language |
|---|---|
| gabi | Tagalog |
| natong/apay | Bikolano |
| ede | Igbo |
| jimbi | Swahili |
| kókò/lámbó | Yoruba |
| kosu (কচু) | Assamese |
| kocu (কচু) | Bengali |
| kacu (কচু) | Kamtapuri/Rajbongshi/Rangpuri |
| kolokasi (Kολοκάσι) | Cypriot Greek |
| kēsave (ಕೇಸವೆ) | Kannada |
| qulqas (قلقاس) | Arabic |
| kontomire | Akan |
| kiri aḷa (කිරි අළ) | Sinhala |
| arbī (अरबी) | Hindi |
| arvi (ਅਰਵੀ) | Punjabi |
| aruī (अरुई) | Bhojpuri |
| arikanchan (अरिकञ्चन) | Maithili |
| aḷavī (અળવી) | Gujarati |
| āḷū (आळू) | Marathi |
| ala (އަލަ) | Dhivehi |
| aba | Ilocano |
| sāru (ସାରୁ) | Odia |
| piḍālu (पिडालु) | Nepali |
| cēppankizhangu (சேப்பந்கிழங்கு) | Tamil |
| cēmpŭ (ചേമ്പ്) | Malayalam |
| cāmadumpa/cāmagaḍḍa (చామదుంప/చామగడ్డ) | Telugu |
| khoai môn | Vietnamese |
| vēnṭī (वेंटी) | Konkani |
| yendem (ꯌꯦꯟꯗꯦꯝ) | Meitei/Manipuri |
| 芋 (yù)/芋頭 (yùtou) | Chinese |
| 里芋 (satoimo) | Japanese |
| 芋 (ō͘/ū) or 芋仔 (ō͘-á) | Taiwanese Hokkien |
| vasa | Paiwan |
| tali | Amis |
| Chinese tayer | Surinamese Dutch |
| saonjo | Malagasy |
| toran (토란) | Korean |
| tolotolo | Bukusu |
| pheuak, puak (เผือก) | Thai |
| pheuak, puak (ເຜືອກ) | Lao |
| trao (ត្រាវ) | Khmer |
| kheu (ခုၣ်) | S'gaw Karen |
| nabbiag | Ahamb |
| pweta | Wusi |
| amadumbe | Zulu |
| amateke | Kirundi and Kinyarwanda |
| *b(u,i)aqa, *bweta | Proto North-Central-Vanuatu (reconstructed) |
| *talo(s), *mʷapo(q), *piRaq, *bulaka, *kamʷa, *(b,p)oso | Proto Oceanic (reconstructed) |

== See also ==
- Aquatic plants
- Domesticated plants and animals of Austronesia
- Lotus effect
- List of vegetables
