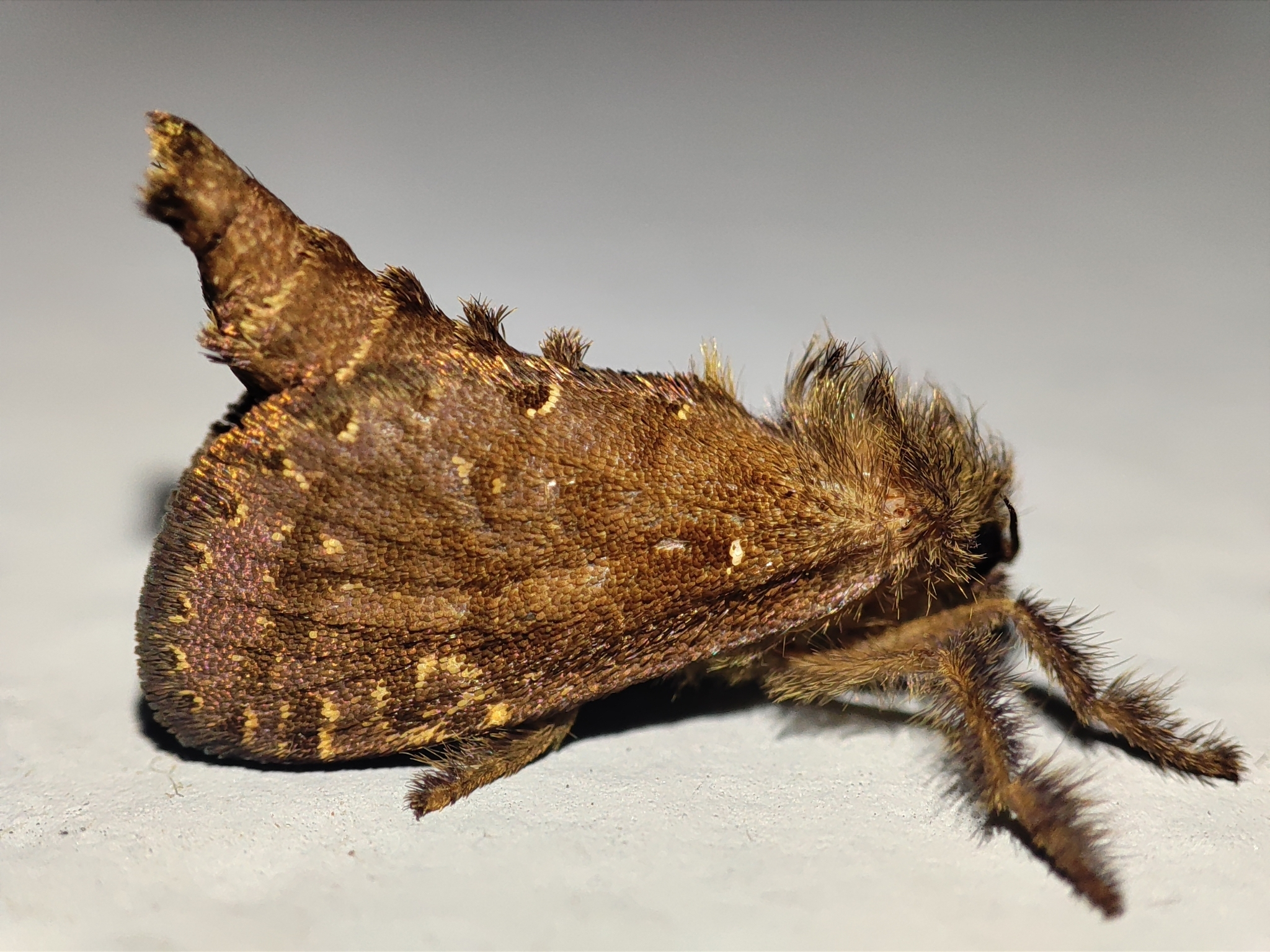

Scientific classification
- Domain: Eukaryota
- Kingdom: Animalia
- Phylum: Arthropoda
- Class: Insecta
- Order: Lepidoptera
- Family: Hepialidae
- Genus: Palpifer
- Species: P. taprobanus

Binomial name
- Palpifer taprobanus (Moore, [1887])

Synonyms
- Hepialus taprobanus Moore, [1887]

= Palpifer taprobanus =

Species of moth

Palpifer taprobanus is a moth of the family Hepialidae. It was described by Frederic Moore in 1887 and is found in Sri Lanka.

The species was once classified as being the same species as Palpifer sexnotatus. In The Fauna of British India, Including Ceylon and Burma: Moths Volume I, George Hampson noted the species collectively as follows:

Male-head, pro and meso thorax dark brown; metathorax black-brown. Fore wing dark red-brown; two white subbasal spots below the median nervure; a round white spot at center of cell; traces of a postmedial dark line; some ochreous specks on costa near apex; a black speck at center of inner margin. Hind wing- the basal area fulvous yellow, extending along the costa nearly to apex; the outer area dark red-brown.

— The Fauna of British India, Including Ceylon and Burma: Moths Volume I
