= Hanuba Hanubi Paan Thaaba =

Old Meitei folktale

Hanuba Hanubi Paan Thaaba (Meitei for 'Old Man and Old Woman planting Colocasia/Taro')
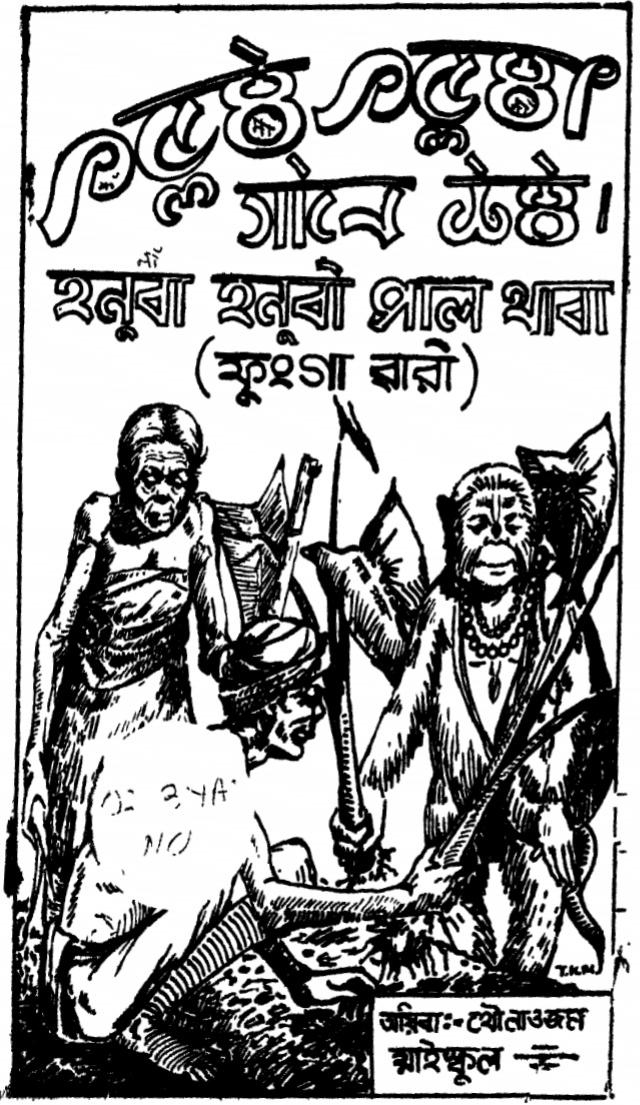
- An illustration of a 20th century Meitei language story book titled Hanuba Hanubi Pal Thaba, by Yaiskul Thounaojam

Folk tale
- Name: Hanuba Hanubi Paan Thaaba (Meitei for 'Old Man and Old Woman planting Colocasia/Taro')
- Also known as: Hanubi Hentak! Hanuba Hentak!
- Mythology: Meitei mythology
- Country: Manipur Kingdom (historical); India (current)
- Region: Kangleipak (Manipur)
- Related: Keibu Keioiba, Lai Khutsangbi, Sandrembi and Chaisra, Tapta, Uchek Langmeitong

The Hanuba Hanubi Paan Thaaba (Meitei for 'Old Man and Old Woman planting Colocasia/Taro'), also known as the Hanubi Hentak! Hanuba Hentak!, is a Meitei folktale. It is about the story of an old man, an old woman and some monkeys.

== Story ==
Once there was a childless old couple, who used to treat a group of monkeys, from the nearby forest, kindly like their own children. One day, the old couple was planting taro plants (Meitei: ꯄꯥꯟ/ꯄꯥꯜ, romanized: "paan"/"paal") in their kitchen garden. Seeing that, the monkeys told the two that it was actually not the right way to plant taros. They told the two that the best peeled off tubers of the taros should initially be boiled in a pot until softened and after getting cooled, these should be planted by wrapping in the banana leaves tightly. The old couple believed the monkeys and they did so as suggested. In the midnight, the monkeys relished all the cooked taros from the garden. And in place of all those delicious taros, they uprooted some inedible giant wild taros from somewhere and planted them in the garden. In the next morning, the old couple were surprised at the sudden growth of the taros they had planted the previous day. The two immediately prepared a dish of the recently full-grown taros and ate them. But as soon as they gulped some, both felt a tingling sensation in their throat. Unable to bear the allergy, both asked to give hentak (Meitei for 'a traditional edible paste made from fish meat and some vegetables') to each other. It was only after they had the hentak that their allergy was cured. Realising that the monkeys had tricked them, the two devised a plan for revenge. And according to the plan, the old man (Meitei: ꯍꯅꯨꯕ, romanized: "hanuba") pretended to be dead, and the old woman (Meitei: ꯍꯅꯨꯕꯤ, romanized: "hanubi") cried out loudly to make the monkeys hear her cry. Then, the monkeys came there and asked the old woman what had happened. She told them that the old man died after eating the taros. She asked them to help her taking the old man's body out in the lawn. All the monkeys, unaware of the plan, came inside the house. As soon as they came near the old man, he took up his stick and started beating them. Frightened, they all ran away. The old couple knew that the monkeys would surely come back. So, they climbed up on the attic and hid there. When the monkeys arrived, the attic broke and felt upon them. Thus, they fled the spot. Fearing that they might come back again, the old couple hid inside a large pot. When the monkeys came back, the old man started to fart slowly. Then, the old woman also farted but she did in an uncontrollable way that the pot banged on. The banging sound was too loud that the monkeys fled the spot and never came back.

== In popular culture ==
"Hanubi Hentak" (Meitei: ꯍꯅꯨꯕꯤ ꯍꯦꯟꯇꯥꯛ), an animation feature film, based on the folktale, was produced by the PUPU FOLKs TV in 2017. "Paan Thaaba" (Meitei for 'Planting Taro'), a play directed by Dr. Usham Rojio, based on the folktale, was premiered in MDU on 15 August 2018.

== See also ==
- Tha Tha Thabungton
