= Palpifer pellicia =

Scientific classification
- Domain: Eukaryota
- Kingdom: Animalia
- Phylum: Arthropoda
- Class: Insecta
- Order: Lepidoptera
- Family: Hepialidae
- Genus: Palpifer
- Species: P. pellicia

Binomial name
- Palpifer pellicia C. Swinhoe, 1905

Species of moth

Palpifer pellicia is a moth of the family Hepialidae first described by Charles Swinhoe in 1905. It is found in India.
