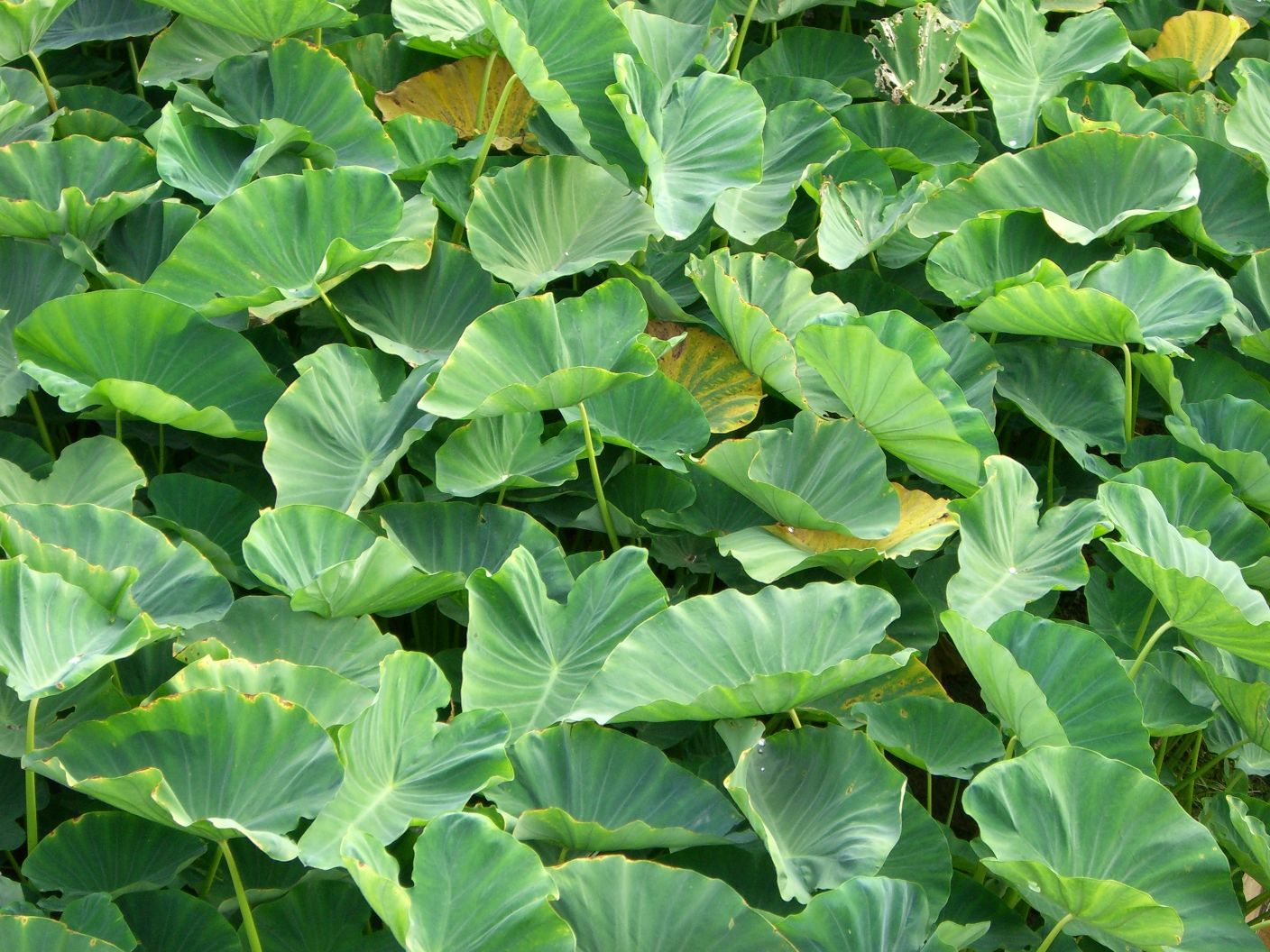
- Colocasia esculenta

Scientific classification
- Kingdom: Plantae
- Clade: Tracheophytes
- Clade: Angiosperms
- Clade: Monocots
- Order: Alismatales
- Family: Araceae
- Subfamily: Aroideae
- Tribe: Colocasieae
- Genus: Colocasia; Schott
- Natural range of the genus Colocasia.

Synonyms
- Leucocasia Schott

= Colocasia =

Genus of plants

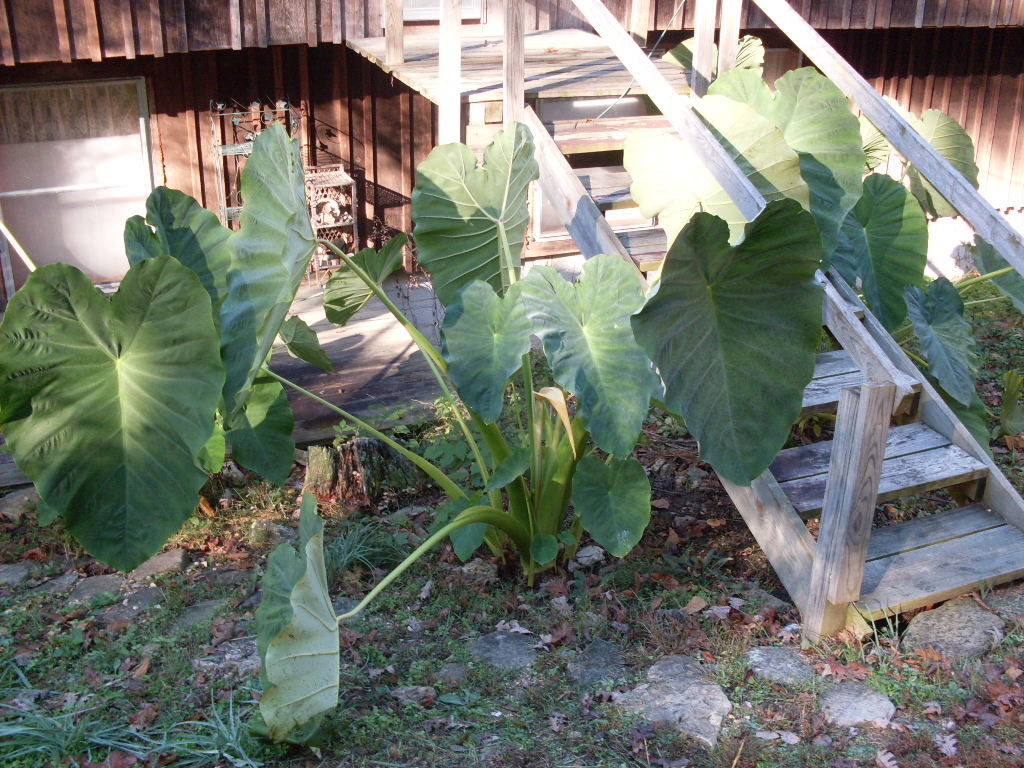
Elephant ear plant with yellow blossom

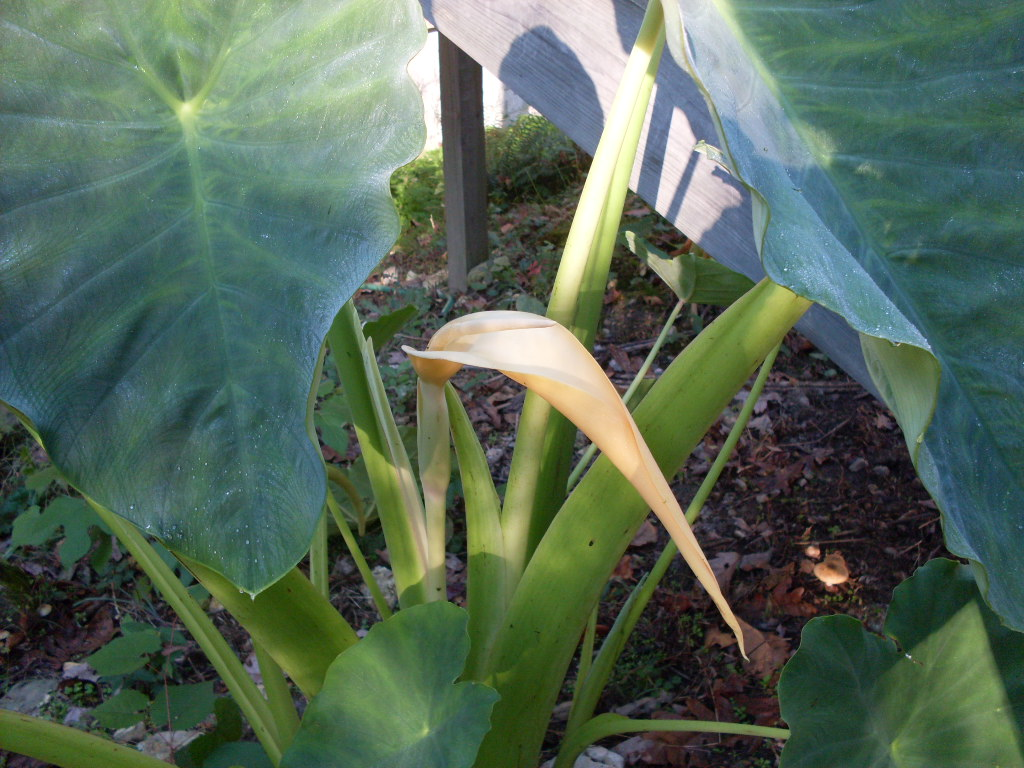
Elephant ear plant with blossom

Colocasia is a genus of flowering plants in the family Araceae, native to Southeast Asia and the Indian subcontinent. Some species are widely cultivated and naturalized in other tropical and subtropical regions. The species C. esculenta (taro) is invasive in wetlands along the Gulf Coast of the United States, where it threatens to displace native wetland plants.

The names elephant ear and cocoyam are also used for some other large-leaved genera in the Araceae, notably Xanthosoma and Caladium.

== Description ==
They are herbaceous perennial plants with a large corm on or just below the ground surface. The leaves are large to very large, 20–150 cm (7.9–59.1 in) long, with a sagittate shape. The elephant's-ear plant gets its name from the leaves, which are shaped like a large ear or shield. The plant reproduces mostly by means of rhizomes (tubers, corms), but it also produces "clusters of two to five fragrant inflorescences in the leaf axils". Like other members of the family, the plant contains an irritant which causes intense discomfort to the lips, mouth and throat. This acridity is caused in part by microscopic needle-like raphides of calcium oxalate monohydrate. It must be processed by cooking, soaking or fermenting – sometimes along with an acid (lime or tamarind) – before being eaten.

=== Chemistry ===
Colocasia leaves contain phytochemicals, such as anthraquinones, apigenin, catechins, cinnamic acid derivatives, vitexin, and isovitexin.

== Taxonomy ==
=== Species ===
There are numerous species of Colocasia.

- Colocasia affinis Schott - Yunnan, Nepal, Assam, Bhutan, Bangladesh, Myanmar, eastern Himalayas
- Colocasia antiquorum or eddoe, sometimes considered a synonym of C. esculenta.
- Colocasia esculenta or taro (L.) Schott - taro, elephant ear - native to southern China, the Indian subcontinent, Indochina, Sumatra; naturalized in other parts of Asia as well as Africa, southern Europe, South America, Central America, the West Indies, the southeastern United States, and many oceanic islands including Hawaii
- Colocasia fallax Schott - Tibet, Yunnan, Himalayas, northern Indochina
- Colocasia fontanesii Schott - Yunnan, eastern Himalayas, northern Indochina
- Colocasia formosana- wild mountain taro Closely resembles C. esculenta and range of South Asia to East Asia and through Southeast Asia to Northern Australia and Papua New Guinea. Also edible and used in culinary applications. The corms, leaves, stolons, inflorescences, and fruit, are used as a food source and medicinally. Also used as fodder for the domestic pig.
- Colocasia hassanii H.Ara -Bangladesh
- Colocasia lihengiae C.L.Long & K.M.Liu - Arunachal Pradesh, Yunnan
- Colocasia mannii Hook.f. - Assam, Nicobar Islands
- Colocasia menglaensis J.T.Yin, H.Li & Z.F.Xu - Yunnan, Laos, Myanmar, Thailand, Vietnam
- Colocasia oresbia A.Hay - Bangladesh, Sabah
- Colocasia tonoimo A.Hay - Unknown

A separate subgroup within the Colocasiae contains one species, which was previously called C. gigantea:

- Leucocasia gigantea (Blume) Hook.f. – giant taro - southern China, Indochina, Malaysia, western Indonesia

=== Etymology ===
The generic name is derived from the ancient Greek word kolokasion, which in the Koine Greek of the 1st-century CE botanist Pedanius Dioscorides may have meant the edible roots of both taro (C. esculenta) and Nelumbo nucifera.

== Ecology ==
Colocasia species are used as food plants by the larvae of some Lepidoptera species including two members of Palpifer, P. murinus and P. sexnotatus.

== Cultivation ==
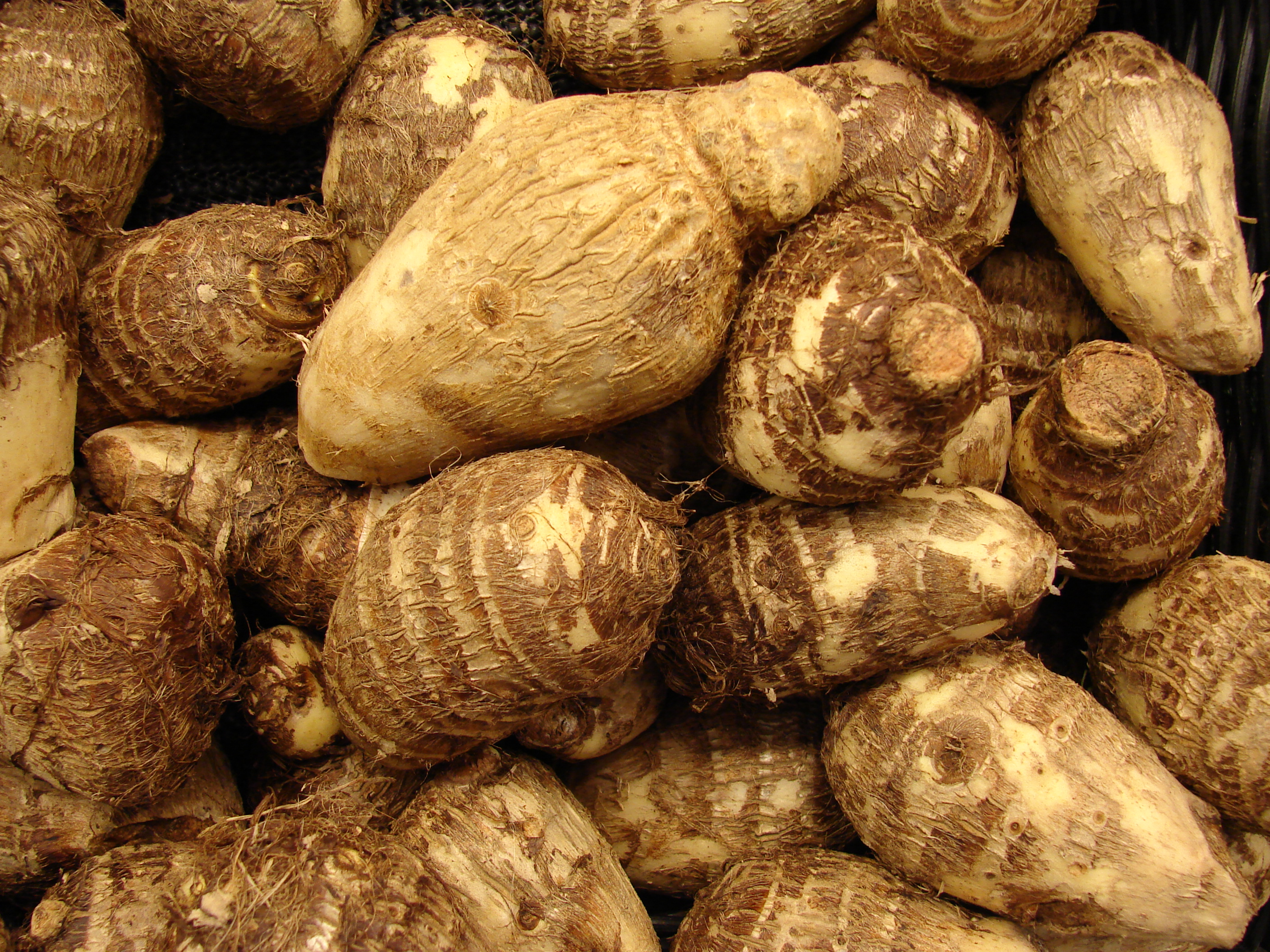
C. esculenta corms

C. esculenta and other members of the genus are cultivated as ornamental plants, or for their edible corms, a traditional starch staple in many tropical areas.

The plant can be grown in the ground or in large containers. They are grown outside year-round in subtropical and tropical areas. In temperate regions, they are planted out for the summer and dug up and stored over winter, dry and with ventilation to prevent fungal infection. They can be grown in almost any temperature zone as long as the summer is warm. Growth is best at temperatures between 20 and 30 °C (68 and 86 °F). The plants can be damaged if temperatures fall below 10 °C (50 °F) for more than a few days.

The root tuber is typically planted close to the surface. The first signs of growth will appear in 1 to 3 weeks. The adult plant will need a minimum of at least 1 m^{2} (11 sq ft) of space for good growth. They do best in compost-rich soil and in shade, but will grow reasonably well in average soil provided it is moisture-retentive. The plants should not be left to go dry for too long; if this does happen, the leaves will wilt; watering will allow the plant to recover if done before they get too dry. Periodic fertilisation (every 3 to 4 weeks) with a common plant fertiliser will increase yields.

== Nutrition ==
Taro roots and leaves are rich in carbohydrates, protein, and dietary minerals. Micronutrients include iron, copper, magnesium, potassium, and zinc.

== Culinary uses ==
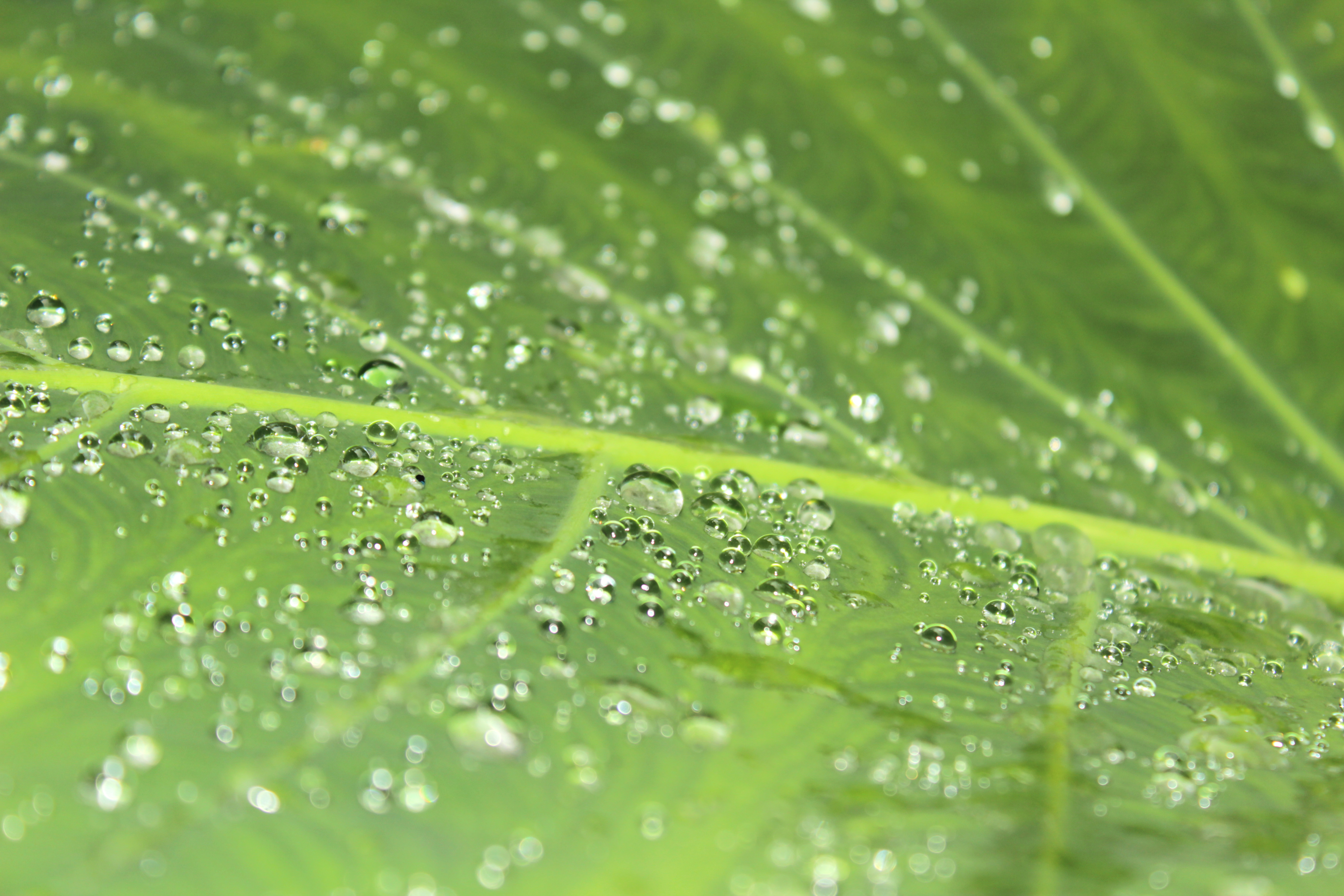
Colocasia leaves are well known for their hydrophobicity.

The edible types are grown in the South Pacific and eaten like potatoes and known as taro, eddoe, and dasheen. The leaves are often boiled with coconut milk to make a soup.

Poi, a Hawaiian dish, is made by boiling the starchy underground stem of the plant then mashing it into a paste.

=== In the Mediterranean ===
In Cyprus, Colocasia has been in use since antiquity. Today it is known as kolokasi (Kολοκάσι). It is usually cooked with celery and pork or chicken, in a tomato sauce in casserole. "Baby" kolokasi is called "poulles": after being fried dry, red wine and coriander seed are added, and then it is served with freshly squeezed lemon. Lately, some restaurants have begun serving thin slices of kolokasi deep fried, calling them "kolokasi chips".

Apart from Cyprus, Colocasia is found in one other Mediterranean island, the Greek island of Ikaria. After the island was declared a Blue zone its culinary tradition has acquired some popularity and Colocasia is part of that tradition. The plant has been reported to have been a vital source of food during World War II. In Ikaria, after it is boiled it is usually eaten as a salad (with raw onions, herbs, olive oil, lemon etc.).

=== In Egypt ===
In Egypt, the tubercles (or kolkas - arabic: قلقاس) are traditionally cut into cubes and cooked in a green soup with celery, chard, garlic and other herbs. Commonly served with white vermicelli rice or eaten with pita bread dipped into the soup. Prepared mostly during the winter time for warmth and widely prepared on January 19 in Christian households as part of celebrating Coptic epiphany. The broth for the soup can be prepared with beef stock and can have some cubes of beef as well.

=== In South Asia ===
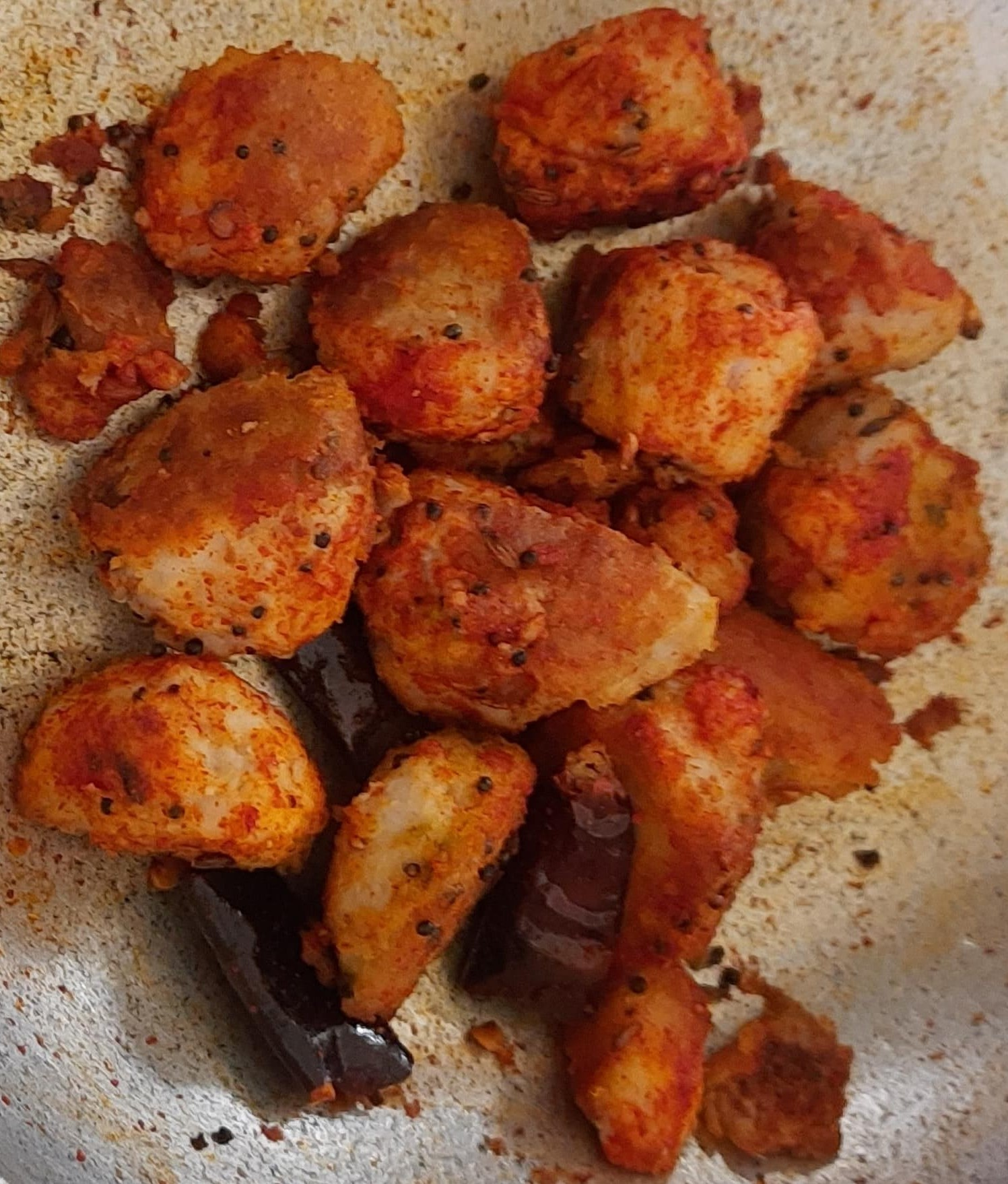
Indian cuisine with Colocasia (curry)

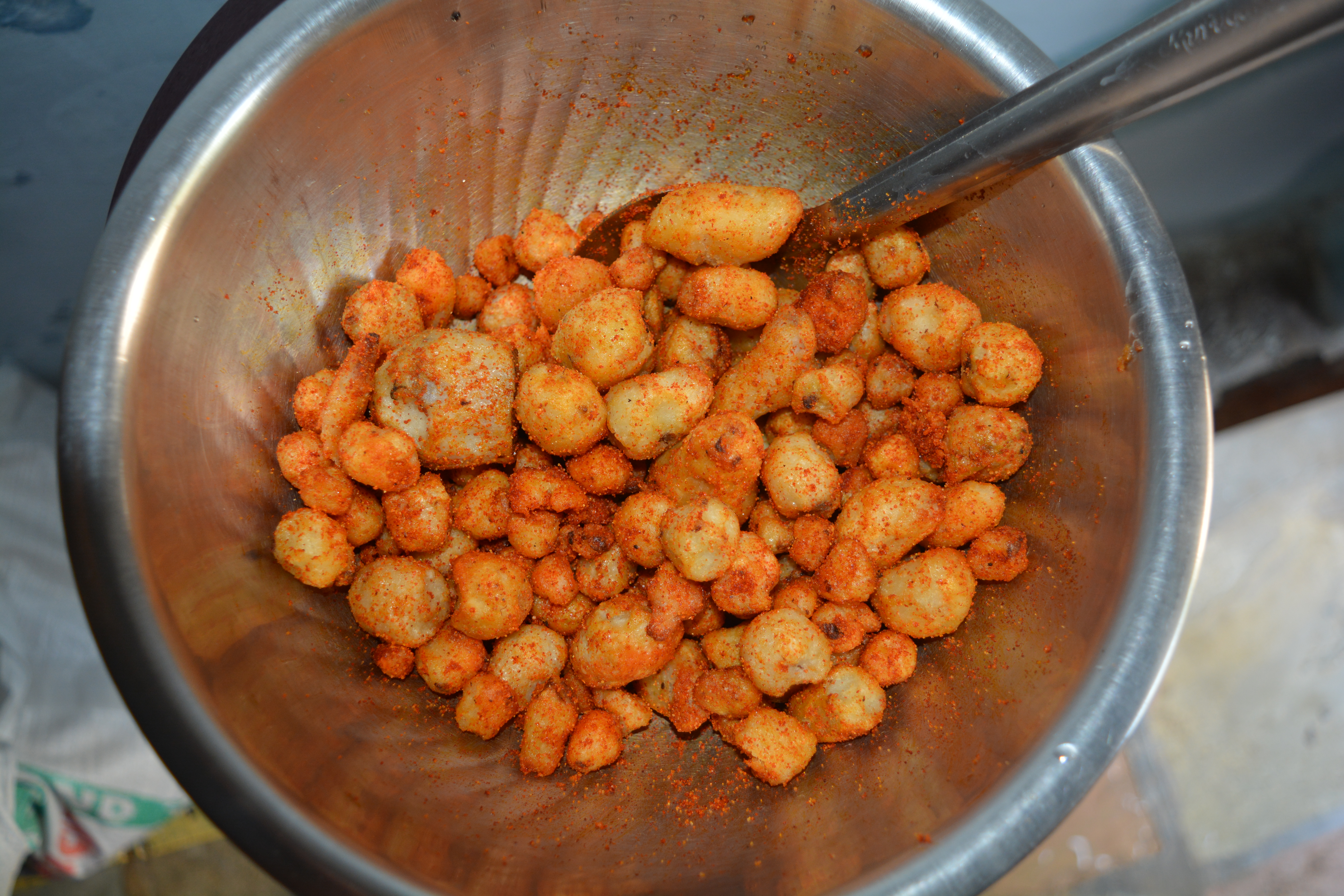
Indian cuisine with Colocasia

Both roots and leaves are eaten. In the Hindi-speaking belt of Northern India and in Pakistan, the root is called arbi. Common preparations include cooking with curry, frying, and boiling.

In Nepal, colocasia leaves and stems are dried and powdered as a spice in curries.

In Mithalanchal (Bihar), the leaf is called airkanchan and is curried.

In Gujarat, arbi leaves are used to make the dish patra. In Eastern part of Uttar Pradesh, arbi, known as arabi ka patta, is used to make the dish sahina. Arbi is also a very popular dish among the Hindu community in South Africa, where it is known as patha. In Manipur, the leaves are used in the Meitei ethnic cuisine, locally known as utti (pronounce ootti). The leaves are called paangkhoklaa by the Meiteis, while the edible corms are known as paan. Paan is often cooked with fermented soy beans to make curries. It is also used to make eromba, a Meitei side dish.

In Odisha, the root is called saru. it is an important ingredient in dalma, a popular Odia dish. The leaves used in a dish called "saru magura", made with rice batter inside the leaf which is steamed and fried.

In Kerala, the leaves are used to make chēmbilacurry, chēmbilāppam, and the roots are used in chembü puzhukkü. Various other recipes also exist locally. The stem and root are used in the preparation of stew and curry. In Kerala, chembu is planted in the month of May and can be harvested in December of the same year.

In Maharashtra, the leaves are called aloo and are used to make a sweet and sour curry with peanuts and cashew nuts that is commonly cooked during marriages. The leaf bases are mixed with curd to make the side dish dethi. The leaves are also coated in besan and fried to make the snack paatwadi or aloowadi.

In Gujarat, this leaf is called arbi (or alvi) and is used to make patra. This is a steamed dish similar to patrode, but with gram flour instead of the rice flour used in patrode. As in Maharashtra, the leaves are eaten as a fried snack.

In Nagaland, the leaves are dried, powdered, kneaded into a dough and baked into biscuits. These biscuits are burnt and dissolved in boiling water before being added into meat dishes to create a thick, flavourful dry gravy.

In Bengal, the plant is called kachu. Its leaves are used to wrap fish and prawns for steaming to make bhapa mach (steamed fish). The roots are used to make a thick creamy curry in which to cook prawns. The roots and stems are grated with coconut and used to create a chutney.

In South Karnataka particularly in the coastal regions, the plant is called Kesavu/ Kesave / ಕೇಸವೆ and the leaves are made into a traditional dish called as 'patrode'or 'patrude'.

In Himachal Pradesh, in northern India, taro corms are known as ghandyali in Mandi districts, and the plant is also known as kachalu in the Kangra district. The dish called patrodu is made using taro leaves rolled with corn or gram flour and boiled in water. Another dish, pujji is made with mashed leaves and the trunk of the plant and ghandyali or taro corms are prepared as a separate dish. In Shimla, a pancake-style dish, called patra or patid, is made using gram flour.

== In culture ==
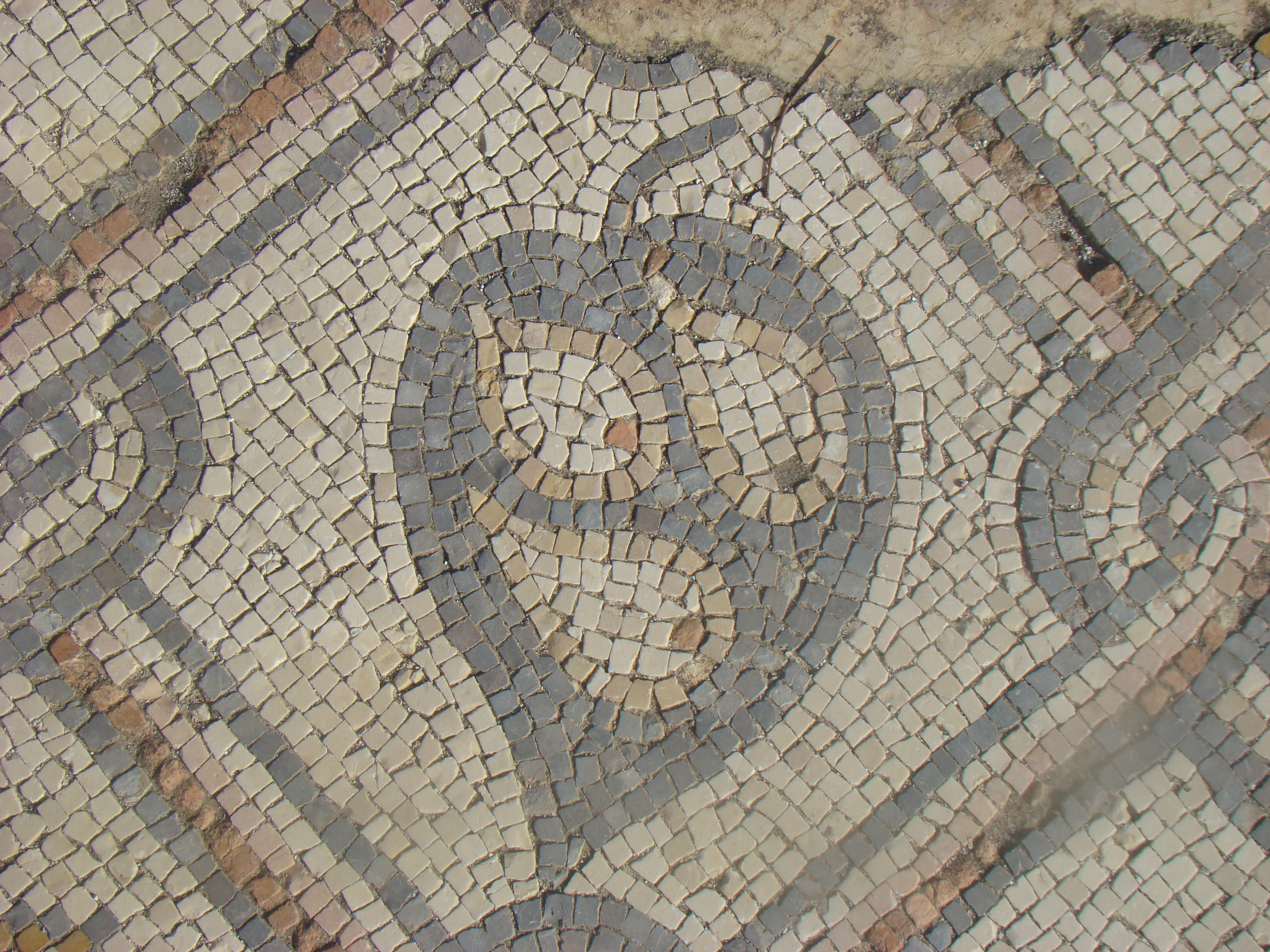
Colocasia leaves are shown in Kursi church mosaics as a platform, such as a plate or bowl, for serving of figs to eat.

In the Levant, Colocasia has been in use since the time of the Byzantine Empire. The leaves are shown in mosaics from Palestine as a platform, such as a plate or bowl, for serving of fruit to eat. For example, at the Kursi church mosaic.

In the Meitei mythology and folklore of Manipur, Colocasia (Meitei: ꯄꯥꯟ) plants are mentioned. One notable example is the Meitei folktale of the Hanuba Hanubi Paan Thaaba (Meitei for 'Old Man and Old Woman planting Colocasia'). (Note: These plants are also said to be taro or other species of Colocasia.) In this lore, an old man and his wife are tricked by a group of monkeys. The old couple plant Colocasia plants according to the advice of the monkeys, peeling off the best tubers of the plants, then boiling them in a pot until softened and wrapping them in banana leaves, then burying them in the soils of the farmlands. While the couple slept, the monkeys snuck into the farmlands and secretly relished all the well-cooked plants, then planted some inedible giant wild Colocasia plants where the couple had put the cooked tubers. The couple then cooks and eats the inedible plants, causing an unbearable tingling sensation in their throats.

== Gallery ==
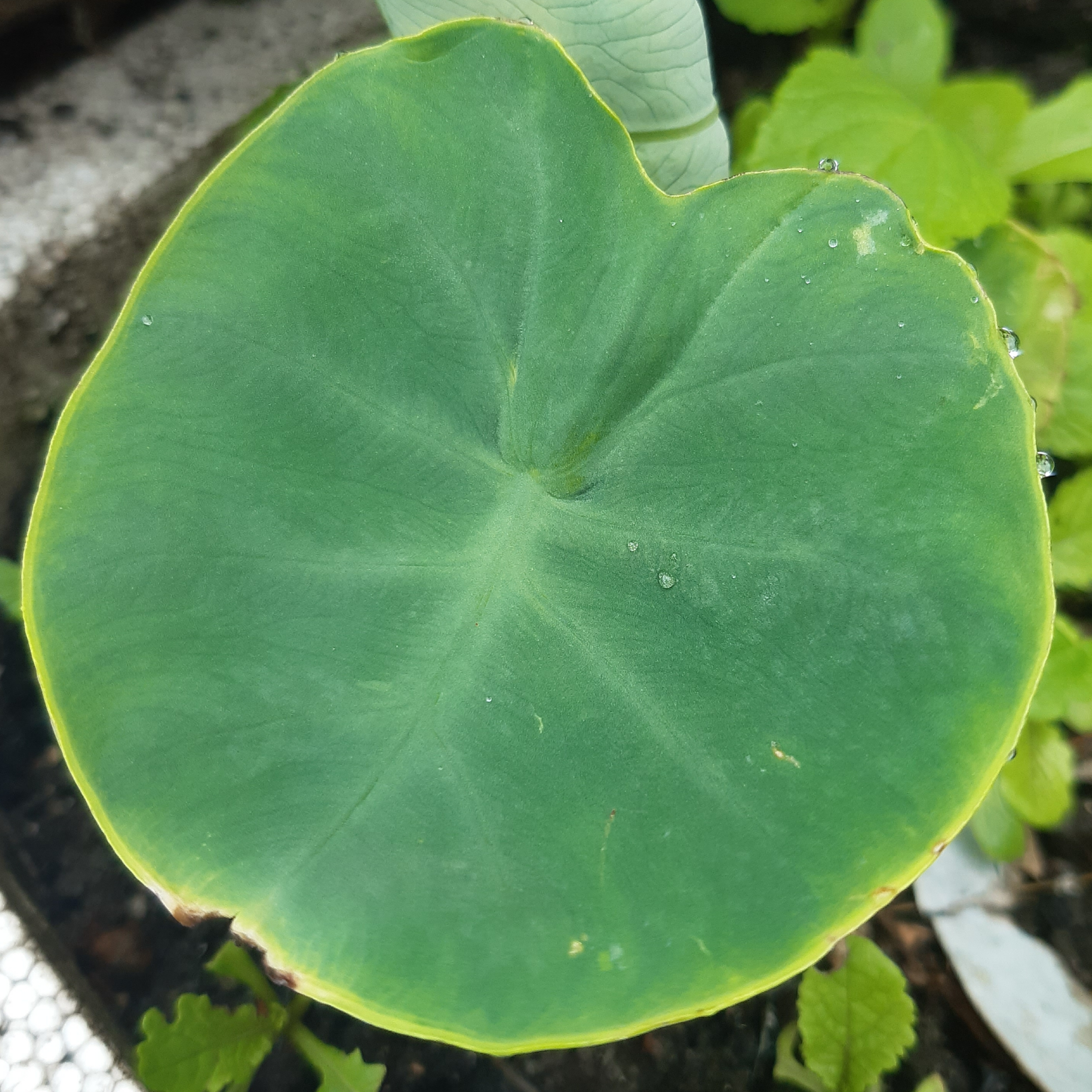
"Elephant ear" plant

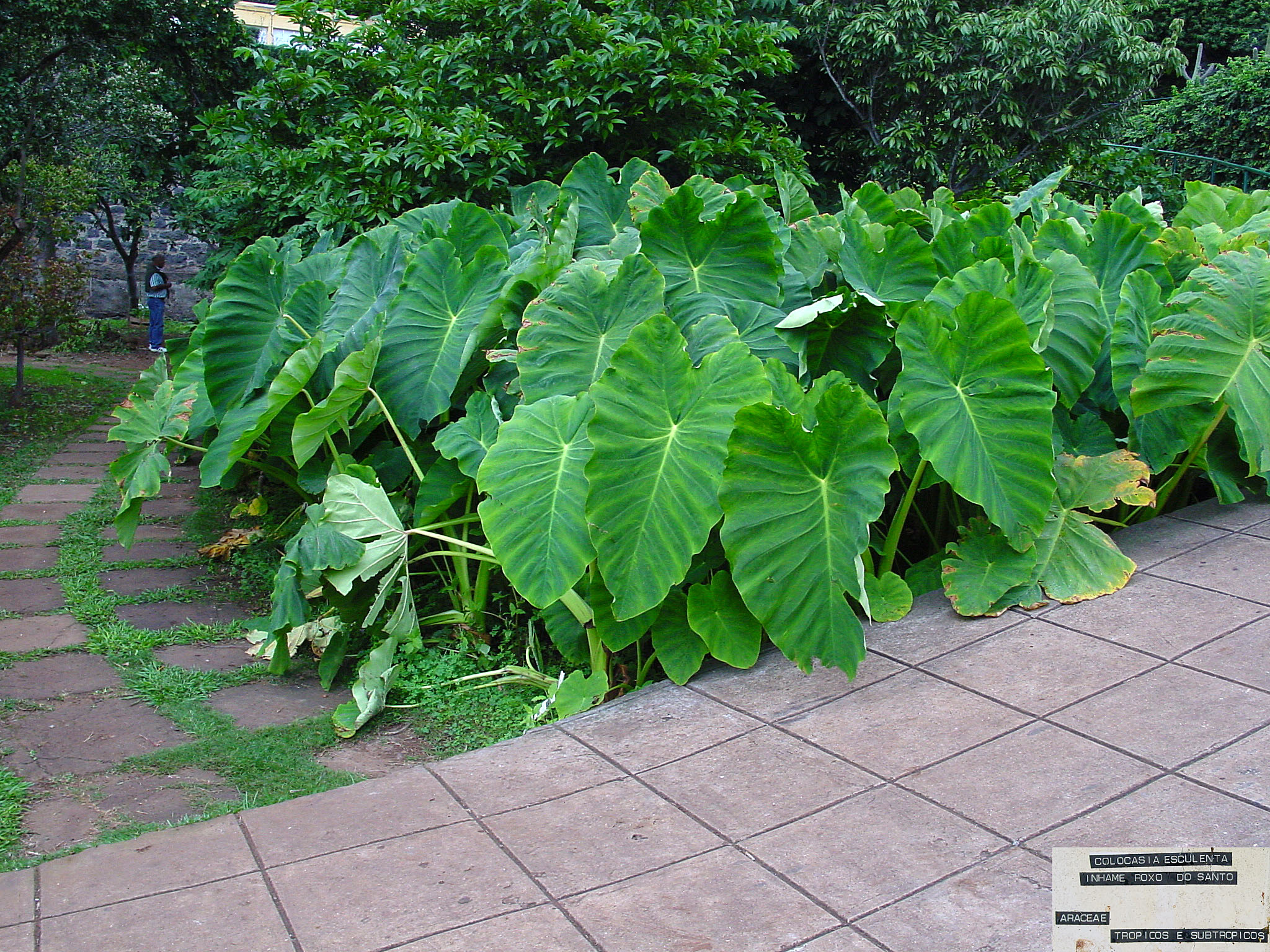
Colocasia esculenta

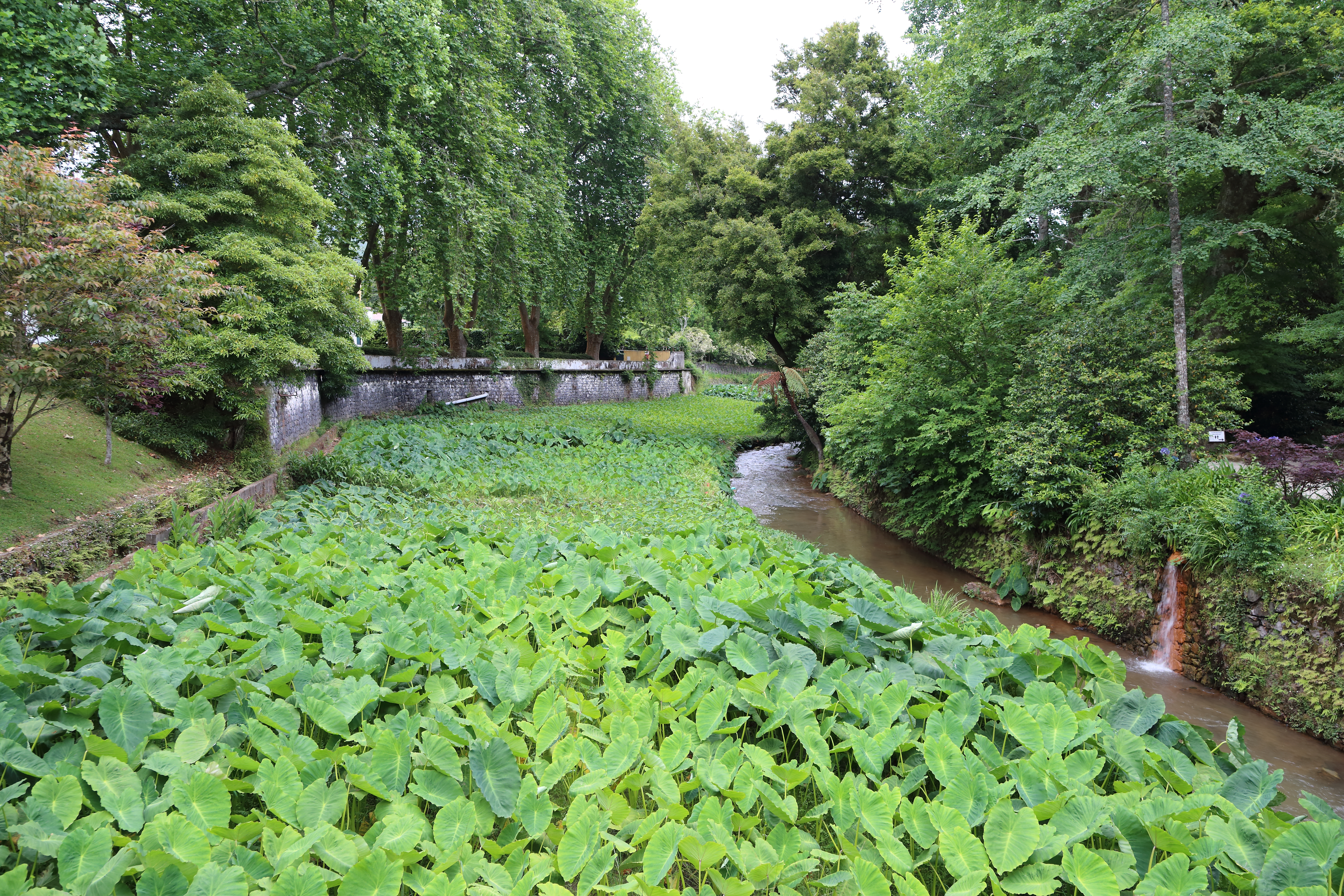
Colocasia esculenta

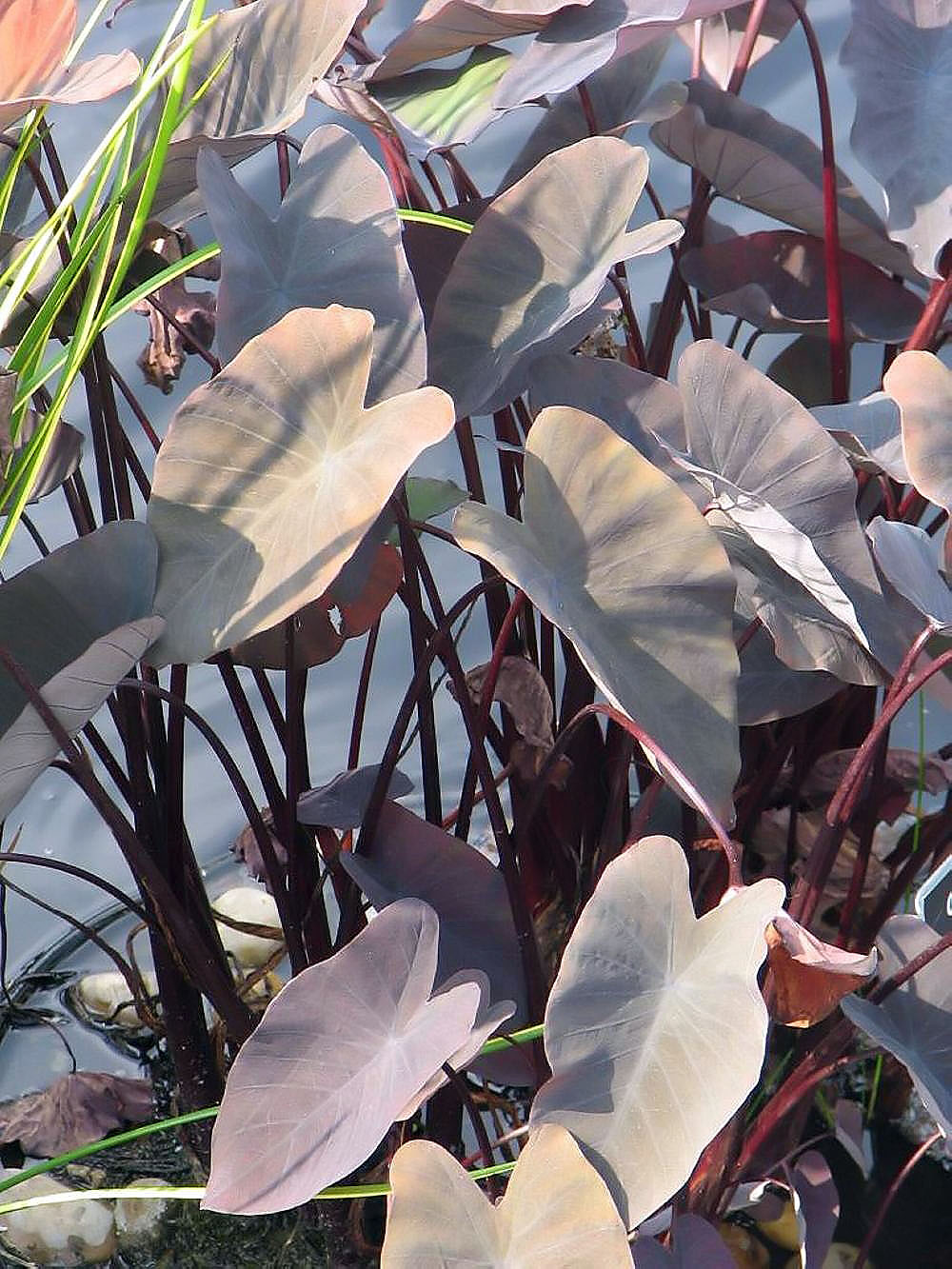
Colocasia esculenta

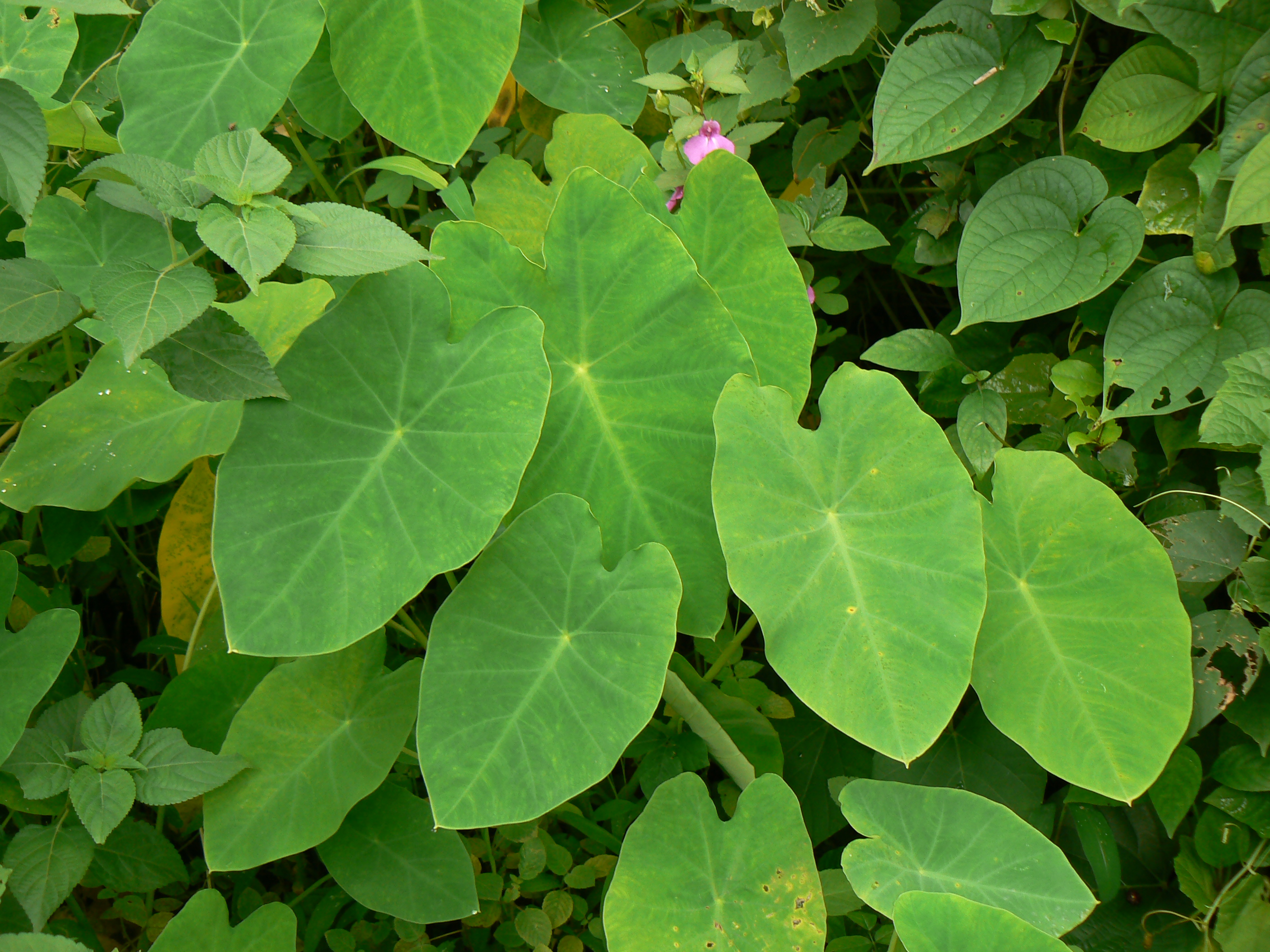
Colocasia esculenta

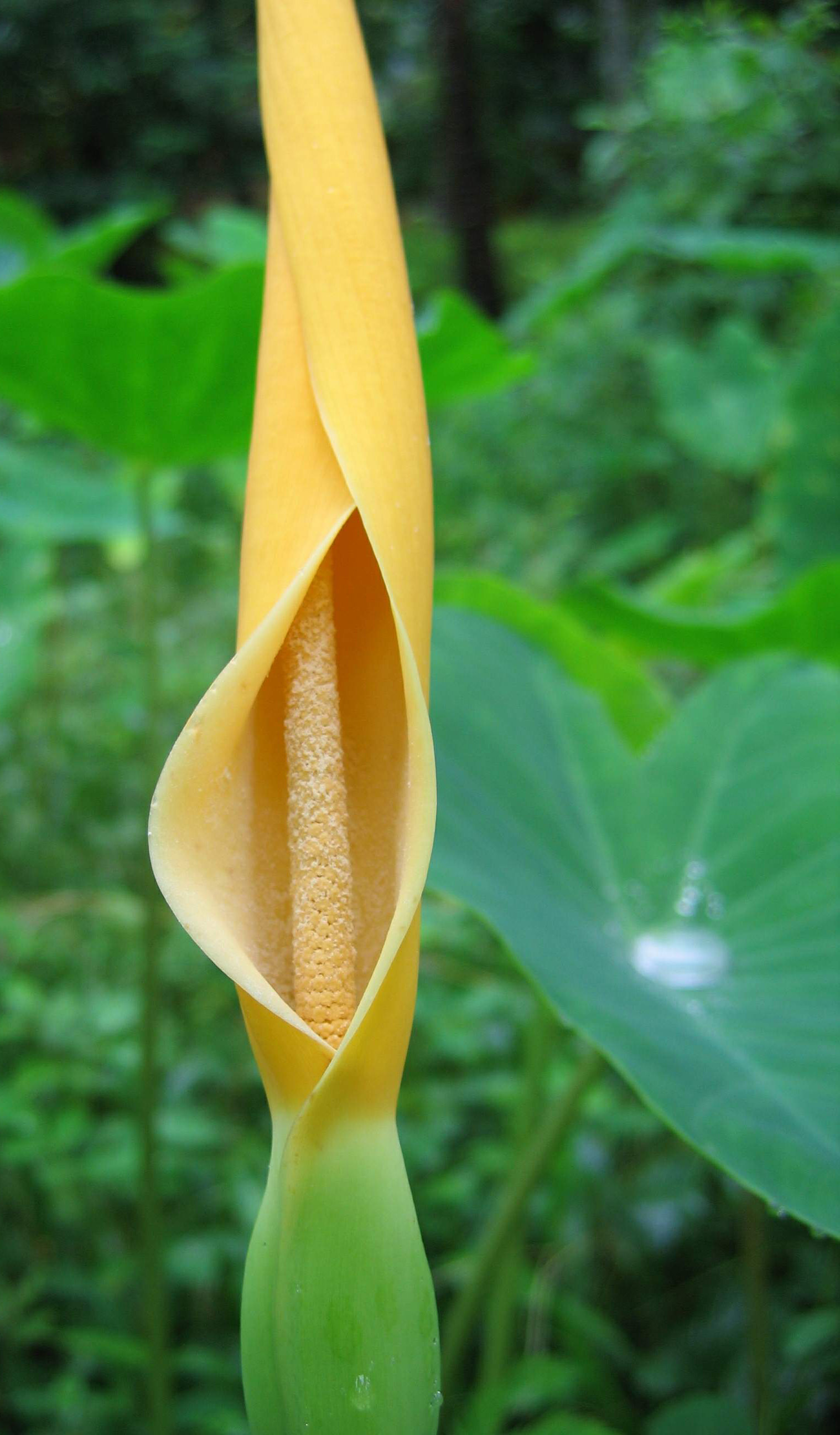
C. esculenta inflorescence

== See also ==
- Cocoyam
