= Palpifer tavoyanus =

Scientific classification
- Domain: Eukaryota
- Kingdom: Animalia
- Phylum: Arthropoda
- Class: Insecta
- Order: Lepidoptera
- Family: Hepialidae
- Genus: Palpifer
- Species: P. tavoyanus

Binomial name
- Palpifer tavoyanus (Moore, 1886)

Synonyms
- Hepialus tavoyanus Moore, 1886; Palpifer tavotanus

Species of moth

Palpifer tavoyanus is a moth of the family Hepialidae. It is found in Myanmar.
