= Palpifer hopponis =

Scientific classification
- Kingdom: Animalia
- Phylum: Arthropoda
- Clade: Pancrustacea
- Class: Insecta
- Order: Lepidoptera
- Family: Hepialidae
- Genus: Palpifer
- Species: P. hopponis

Binomial name
- Palpifer hopponis Matsumura, 1931

Species of moth

Palpifer hopponis is a moth of the family Hepialidae. It is found in Taiwan.
