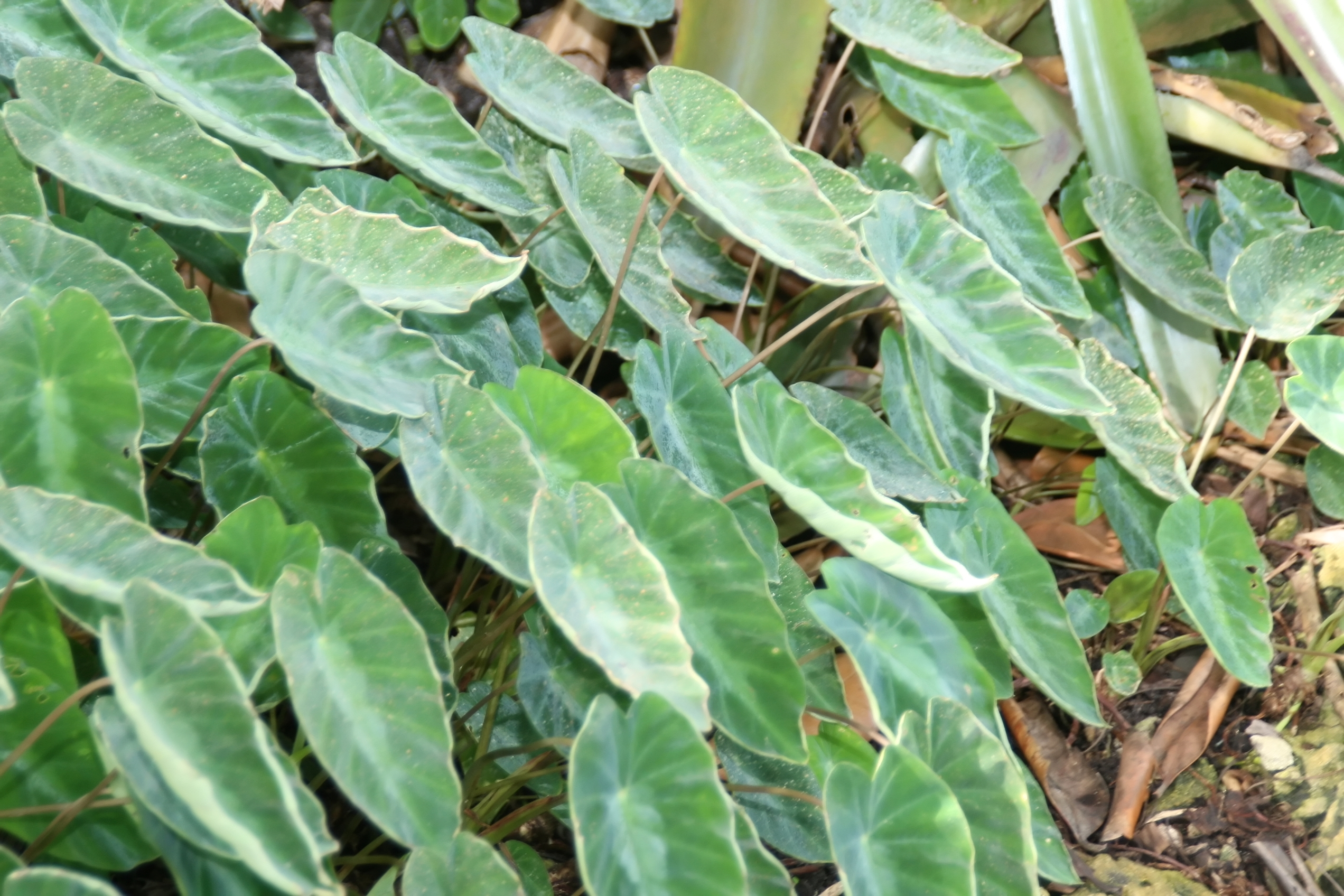
- At the Fairchild Tropical Botanic Garden

Scientific classification
- Kingdom: Plantae
- Clade: Tracheophytes
- Clade: Angiosperms
- Clade: Monocots
- Order: Alismatales
- Family: Araceae
- Genus: Colocasia
- Species: C. fallax

Binomial name
- Colocasia fallax Schott

Synonyms
- List: Colocasia fallax var. purpurea H.Ara & M.A.Hassan; Colocasia heterochroma H.Li & Z.X.Wei; Colocasia kerrii Gagnep.; Colocasia tibetensis J.T.Yin; Colocasia yunnanensis C.L.Long & X.Z.Cai

= Colocasia fallax =

Species of flowering plant

Colocasia fallax, the silver leaf dwarf elephant ear or dwarf taro, is a species of flowering plant in the family Araceae, native to the Indian Subcontinent, Tibet and Yunnan in China, and mainland Southeast Asia. A spreading perennial with attractive foliage reaching at most 1.5 ft (0.5 m), it has found use as a houseplant, and as garden plant in USDA zones 8 through 10. Preferring wet conditions and high humidity, it is best suited for pond edges, water gardens and similar applications. Its native habitats include dense forests, valley scrub, and moist stream banks.
