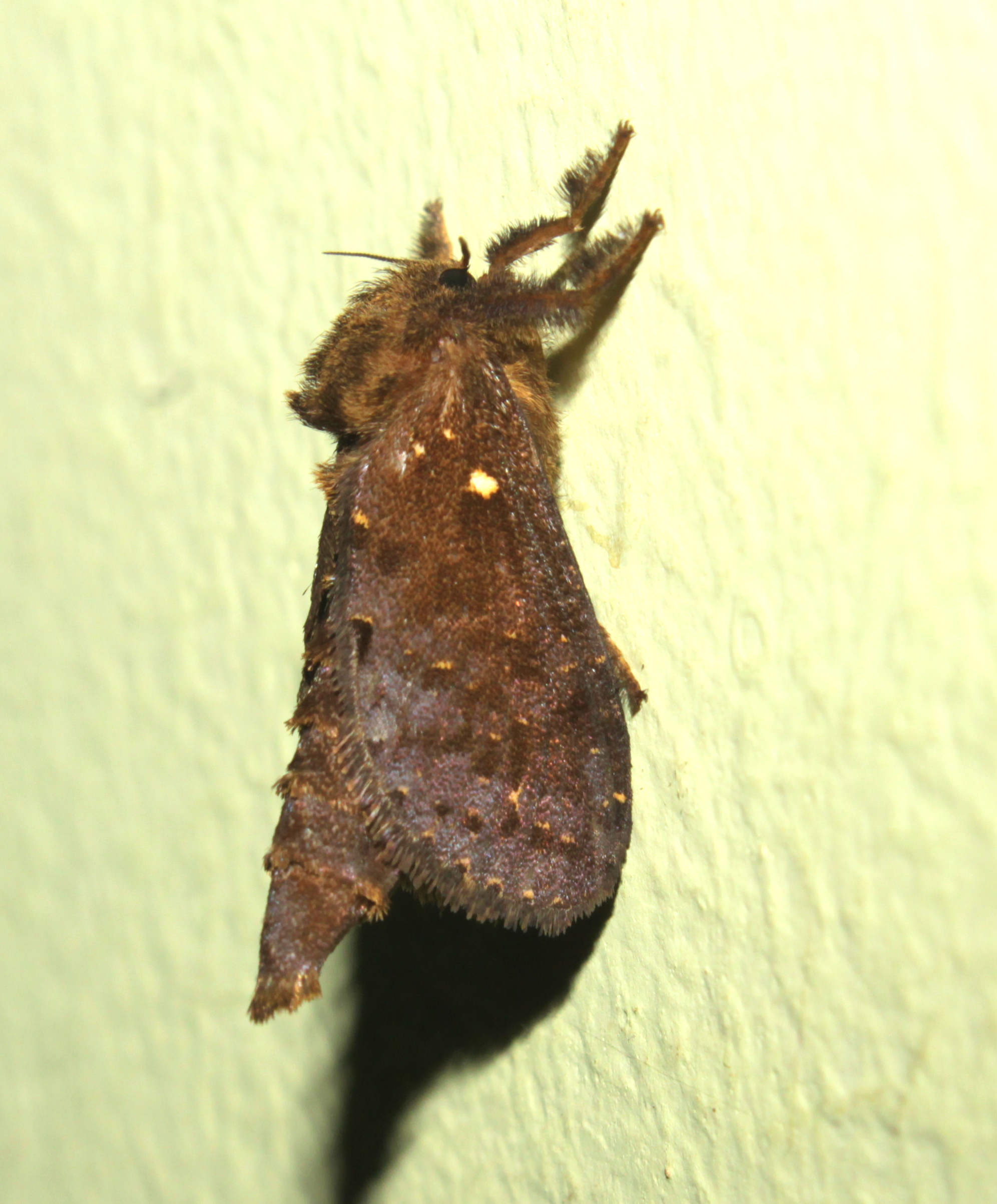
- A Palpifer moth

Scientific classification
- Domain: Eukaryota
- Kingdom: Animalia
- Phylum: Arthropoda
- Class: Insecta
- Order: Lepidoptera
- Family: Hepialidae
- Genus: Palpifer; Hampson, 1893

Synonyms
- Palpiphorus Quail, 1900; Palpiphora Pagenstecher, 1909

= Palpifer =

Genus of moths

Palpifer is a genus of moths of the family Hepialidae described by George Hampson in 1893. There are 10 described species found in south and east Asia and parts of Mexico.

Species of the genus possess large rounded and ascending palpi. Antennae short and setiferous (bristly). Legs hairy with spurs absent on tibia. Forewings without a bar between vein 1b and the median nervure. Veins 7, 8 and 9, 10 stalked in both wings. Veinlets in cell forked.

== Species ==
- Palpifer falkneri - Nepal
- Palpifer hopponis - Taiwan
- Palpifer madurensis - Madura
- Palpifer murinus - India

- Food plant: Colocasia

- Palpifer pellicia - India
- Palpifer sexnotatus - India/Japan

- Recorded food plants: Amorphophallus, Colocasia

- Palpifer sordida - Java

- Recorded food plants: Alocasia, Amorphophallus, Dioscorea

- Palpifer taprobanus - Sri Lanka
- Palpifer tavoyanus - Myanmar
- Palpifer umbrinus - India
