= Palpifer madurensis =

Scientific classification
- Domain: Eukaryota
- Kingdom: Animalia
- Phylum: Arthropoda
- Class: Insecta
- Order: Lepidoptera
- Family: Hepialidae
- Genus: Palpifer
- Species: P. madurensis

Binomial name
- Palpifer madurensis (Pfitzner, 1914)

Synonyms
- Pielus madurensis Pfitzner, 1914

Species of moth

Palpifer madurensis is a moth of the family Hepialidae. It is found in Madura, from which its species epithet is derived.
