= Palpifer sordida =

Scientific classification
- Kingdom: Animalia
- Phylum: Arthropoda
- Class: Insecta
- Order: Lepidoptera
- Family: Hepialidae
- Genus: Palpifer
- Species: P. sordida

Binomial name
- Palpifer sordida Snellen, 1900

Synonyms
- Palpifer notatus Pfitzner in Pfitzner and Gaede, 1933

Species of moth

Palpifer sordida is a moth of the family Hepialidae. It was described by Pieter Cornelius Tobias Snellen in 1900. It is found in Java, Indonesia. Food plants for this species include Alocasia, Amorphophallus, and Dioscorea.
