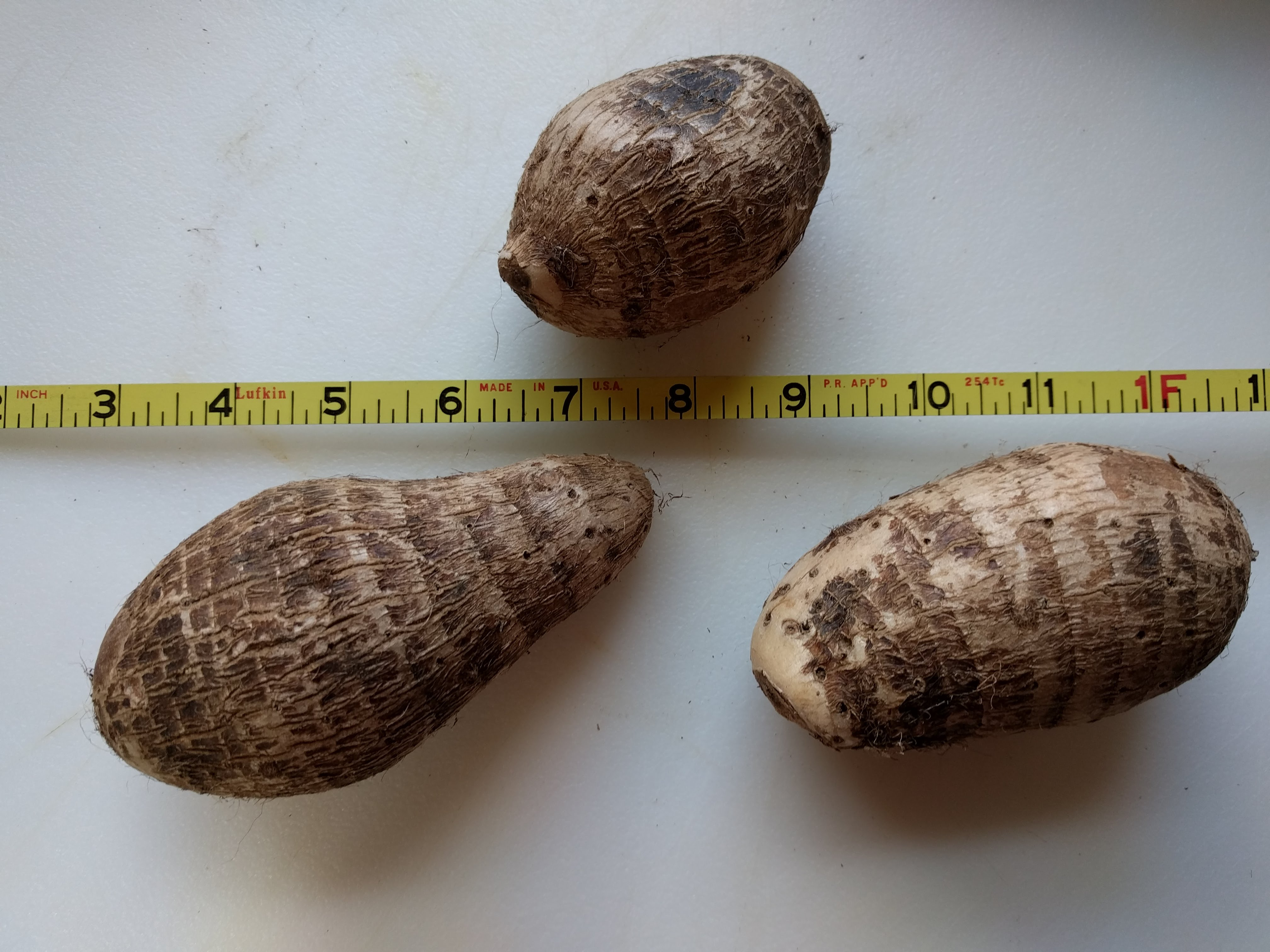

Scientific classification
- Kingdom: Plantae
- Clade: Embryophytes
- Clade: Tracheophytes
- Clade: Spermatophytes
- Clade: Angiosperms
- Clade: Monocots
- Order: Alismatales
- Family: Araceae
- Genus: Colocasia
- Species: C. antiquorum

Binomial name
- Colocasia antiquorum Schott

Synonyms
- Colocasia fontanesii Schott; Colocasia gaoligongensis H.Li & C.L.Long; Colocasia gongii C.L.Long & H.Li; Colocasia lihengiae C.L.Long & K.M.Liu; Caladium antiquorum (Schott) André

= Eddoe =

Species of plant

Eddoe or eddo (Colocasia antiquorum= Colocasia esculenta= taro) is a species in the genus Colocasia. It is a tropical vegetable, closely related to taro (dasheen, Colocasia esculenta), which is primarily used for its thickened stems (corms). In most cultivars there is an acrid taste that requires careful cooking. The young leaves can also be cooked and eaten, but (unlike taro) they have a somewhat acrid taste.

== Taxonomy ==
Carl Linnaeus originally described two species which are now known as Colocasia esculenta and C. antiquorum of the cultivated plants that are known by many names including eddoes, dasheen, taro, but many later botanists consider them all to be members of a single, very variable species, the correct name for which is C. esculenta.

== Etymology ==
The English word eddo may have its origin in Akan, from a form cognate with Twi o^{1}de^{3} "yam"; or Fante o^{1}do^{3}.

Alternatively, it may originate in the Igbo language, specifically from the word édè meaning 'taro' (cocoyam). This hypothesis would be coherent with the significant historical presence of the Igbo people in Jamaica, who have had a considerable influence on the local culture and language.

Eddoes are also sometimes called malangas in Spanish-speaking areas, but that name is also used for other plants of the family Araceae, including tannia (Xanthosoma spp.). Yautias is a more specific term.

== Cultivation ==
Eddoes appear to have been developed as a crop in China and Japan and introduced from there to the West Indies where they are sometimes called "Chinese eddoes". They grow best in rich loam soil with good drainage, but they can be grown in poorer soil, in drier climates, and in cooler temperatures than taro.

== Uses ==
Eddoes make part of the generic classification cará or inhame of the Portuguese language which, beside taro, also includes root vegetables of the genera Alocasia and Dioscorea. They are the most commonly eaten inhames/carás in the states of São Paulo, Rio de Janeiro and Espírito Santo, as well as surrounding regions of all. They are also fairly common in Northeastern Brazil, where they might be called batata (literally "potato"). According to Brazilian folk knowledge, the eddoes most appropriate to be cooked are those that are more deeply pink, or at least pinkish lavender, in the area where the leaves were cut.

The 1889 book The Useful Native Plants of Australia records that C. antiquorum:

is cultivated in most tropical countries, Egypt, India, etc., for the sake of its leaves, which when uncooked are acrid, but on boiling, the water being changed, they lose their acridity, and may be eaten as spinach." (Treasury of Botany) Acid fruits are added to assist the removal of the acridity. Hindoos [sic.] and Mahometans [sic.] are very fond of all parts of the plants of this genus." (Dymock.) "When the crop is gathered in Fiji," says Dr. Seemann (Flora Vtliensis), " the tops of the tubers are cut off and at once replanted. The young leaves may be eaten like spinach, but, like the root, they require to be well cooked in order to destroy the acridity peculiar to aroideous plants. The Fijians prefer eating the cooked Taro when cold; Europeans as a rule like it quite hot, and, if possible, roasted. A considerable number of varieties are known, some better adapted for puddings, some for bread, or simply for boiling or baking. The outer marks of distinction chiefly rest upon the different tinge observable in the corm, leaf, stalks, and ribs of the leaves - white, yellowish, purple."

== See also ==
- Domesticated plants and animals of Austronesia
