= Palpifer umbrinus =

Scientific classification
- Domain: Eukaryota
- Kingdom: Animalia
- Phylum: Arthropoda
- Class: Insecta
- Order: Lepidoptera
- Family: Hepialidae
- Genus: Palpifer
- Species: P. umbrinus

Binomial name
- Palpifer umbrinus (Moore, 1879)

Synonyms
- Hepialus umbrinus Moore, 1879

Species of moth

Palpifer umbrinus is a moth of the family Hepialidae. It is found in India.
