= Palpifer falkneri =

Scientific classification
- Kingdom: Animalia
- Phylum: Arthropoda
- Class: Insecta
- Order: Lepidoptera
- Family: Hepialidae
- Genus: Palpifer
- Species: P. falkneri

Binomial name
- Palpifer falkneri Viette, 1968

Species of moth

Palpifer falkneri is a moth of the family Hepialidae. It is found in Nepal.
