= Palpifer murinus =

Scientific classification
- Domain: Eukaryota
- Kingdom: Animalia
- Phylum: Arthropoda
- Class: Insecta
- Order: Lepidoptera
- Family: Hepialidae
- Genus: Palpifer
- Species: P. murinus

Binomial name
- Palpifer murinus (Moore, 1879)

Synonyms
- Hepialus murinus Moore, 1879; Palpifer caerulescens Swinhoe, 1894; Palpifer coerulescens

Species of moth

Palpifer murinus is a moth of the family Hepialidae. It is found in India. The food plant for this species is Colocasia.
