= Tapta =

Character in Meitei folklore

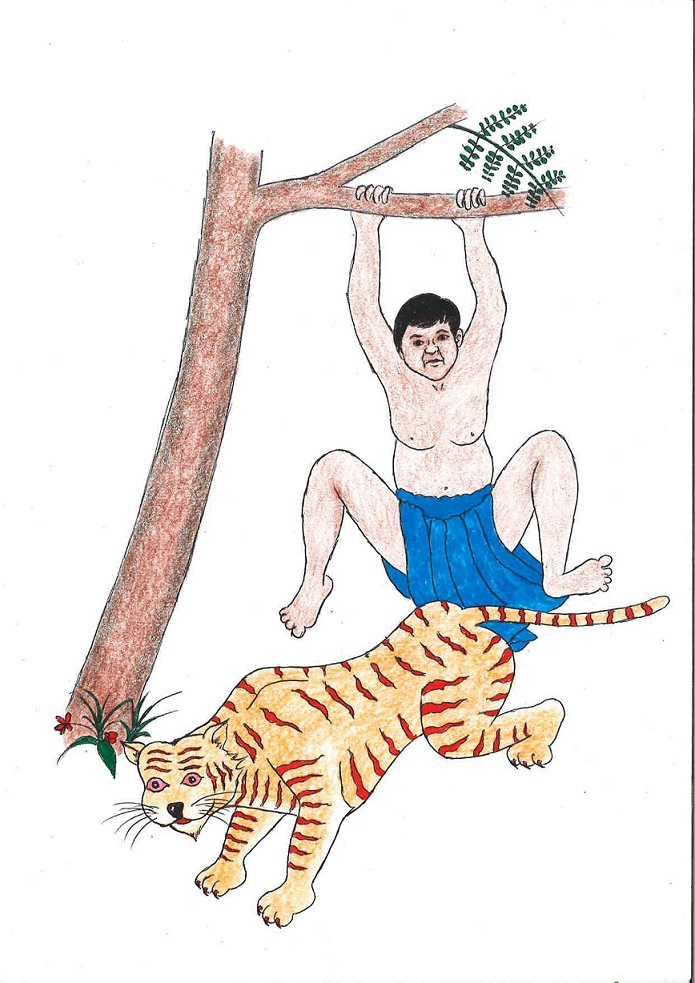
The thief escaping from the tiger

Tapta (/tap-taa/) is a character in Meitei folklore of Ancient Manipur. It is a creature described by a mother's imagination to her child, to stop their cry. Etymologically, "Tapta" is made of two words, "Tap" (sound of water drops falling on the ground) and "Ta" (literally meaning "to fall") in Meitei (Manipuri).

== Summary ==
=== Arrival of the criminals ===
Once there was a child who never stopped crying. One night, when it was raining heavily, a thief came to steal a horse from the house of the child and a tiger also came to prey on one of the horses from the same place. As the two criminals were silently waiting a right time for their chances in the dark corners of the horse-stable, they heard the mother ("father" in another version) telling her child about many scary creatures, like the elephant, the horse, the lion and the tiger coming, to pacify his crying but it was of no use to the child. And the non-stop weeping child suddenly remained silent when the mother mentioned the name "Tapta".

=== Beliefs ===
So, both the thief and the tiger believed that "Tapta" might surely be a dangerous creature. In the darkness, the thief started searching for the horses in the horse-stable. And as he was touching things one by one in the darkness, it coincided that he held the legs of the hiding tiger, thinking it as one of the horses in the stable. And the tiger thought that the person holding him would be none other than the so-called "Tapta". And so, the ferocious tiger behaved like an obedient pet animal, fearing of the "Tapta". In the darkness of the stable, the thief prepared reins and saddles on the tiger ("false horse") and drove him away towards the woods. Again in the darkness of the woods, the tiger still believed that the person riding on and driving him was the so-called "Tapta". And during the dawn, when there was abundant light, the thief recognised that the creature he had stolen was not a horse but a tiger. So, he tried to escape himself from the driving beast but the tiger never stopped running.

=== Escape ===
The thief saw a branch of a tree on the way the tiger was running. And with intelligent and quick steps, he jumped on the branch leaving the tiger alone running. A few moments later, the tiger realised the absence of the "Tapta" (actually, the thief) from his back. So, he thought that "Tapta" might even be able to fly on the air, that was how he was gone from him. So, on his way back to home, the tiger met many other animals, including a bear, an elephant, a fox and even another tiger (variable according to different versions of the story), to whom he narrated all the incidents. All these animals did not trust him and asked him to take them to the spot where the "Tapta" had freed him. On the other hand, the thief hid himself on a "tree hole" ("tree hollow") of the same tree, on whose branch he had jumped on. As the animals led by the tiger came to the spot, the tiger told them that the very spot was nearby the tree with a hole (where the thief was hiding). So, in searching for the "Tapta", they met many unlucky circumstances, leading them to believe in what the tiger had said to be correct. For example, when the bear inserted his small tail to the tree hollow, the thief pulled it inwards with his full strength and let it go off, that the bear fell to the ground. When the elephant inserted his trunk into the tree hollow, the thief hurt it with something (probably with a stick) so hard that the elephant yelled with pain.

=== Royal judgement ===
Finally, all of these animals approached to the lion, His Highness of the forest, and narrated all the incidents. So, the lion decided to check out the matter by Himself. Meanwhile, the thief had escaped and ran away for safety. And as the lion arrived, there was no one at that place. But the other animals still believe that there is a dangerous creature called the "Tapta".

== Other websites ==
- Folk_Tales.Tapta
- Tapta by G.C. Tongbra, 1982
