= Palpifer sexnotatus =

Scientific classification
- Domain: Eukaryota
- Kingdom: Animalia
- Phylum: Arthropoda
- Class: Insecta
- Order: Lepidoptera
- Family: Hepialidae
- Genus: Palpifer
- Species: P. sexnotatus

Binomial name
- Palpifer sexnotatus (Moore, 1879)

Synonyms
- Hepialus sexnotatus Moore, 1879; Gorgopis niphonica Butler, 1879; Palpifer ronin Pfitzner, 1912; Palpifer sexnotaius Pfitzner, 1912

Species of moth

Palpifer sexnotatus is a moth of the family Hepialidae. It is found in India and Japan. Food plants for the species include Amorphophallus and Colocasia.
